= Eternal Champion =

Fictional character

The Eternal Champion is a fictional character created by British author Michael Moorcock and is a recurrent feature in many of his speculative fiction works.

== General overview ==
Many of Moorcock's novels and short stories take place in a shared Multiverse: an array of interconnected parallel universes, many-layered dimensions, spheres, and alternative worlds, spanning from the Big Bang to the End of Time and from planet Earth to faraway galaxies. All these regions of spaces and parallel timelines are given shape by two metaphysical forces which are perpetually opposed to each other: Law and Chaos, which represent perpetual stasis and ever-changing disorder. Since a clear-cut prevalence of either Law or Chaos would erase all life from the Multiverse, a third force known as the Cosmic Balance enforces certain limits on the powers of Law and Chaos, which in turn ensure the continued existence of the Multiverse. Law, Chaos, and the Balance are implied to be non-sentient, but they do manifest through god-like beings who express one facet or another of the three cosmic principles, and in turn, these deities can empower mortal creatures as their heralds and representatives.

The Eternal Champion is an appointed paladin of Balance who is bound to exist in each and every world and age of the Multiverse, so that Law and Chaos are perpetually kept in check; however, he often does not know of his role or struggles against it, never to succeed. Since he must intervene whenever either Law or Chaos has gained an excess of power, requiring him to tip the scales accordingly, he is always doomed to be surrounded by strife and destruction, although he may go through long periods of relative quiet.

All the different Eternal Champions are implied to be different facets or "incarnations" of one semi-conscious being (a platonic archetype of a sort): most of them are peerless fighters and generals and have an unbreakable bond with a sentient Chaos-aligned weapon, the Black Sword, which, in turn, takes on a different form for each Champion. Likewise, many Champions are aided by an Eternal Companion and an Eternal Consort: a sidekick and a love interest who are themselves aspects of two semi-divine figures. This recursivity through the Multiverse is further underlined by the number of Champions, Companions, and mentor-figures to the Champions Moorcock has given the J and C initials, as a form of naming fil rouge; in the same vein, many Champions and Companions belong to one branch or another of the extensive von Bek dynasty.

Space- and time-travels through the Multiverse are in fact possible, to the point that one humanoid species called the Eldrens is spread among many different worlds and ages and interacts with many different Champions; however, cosmic laws establish that no two Eternal Champions can coexist in the same situation, or the very fabric of reality would be severely damaged. The only exceptions are cataclysmic events such as the end of a Cycle of Cycles of the Multiverse's progression, or an invasion by hostile entities from an entirely separate multiverse; in these cases, different incarnations of the Champion may join forces to thwart the impending threat, possibly by temporarily merging their individual bodies into a true demigod of immense power.

== Incarnations ==
The following list presents all known Champions in alphabetical order, mentions their respective Swords, Companions, and Consorts, and briefly summarizes their individual plotlines and publishing history:

- Alerik
- Alivale
- Konrad Arflane: the hero of the postapocalyptic novel The Ice Schooner (1969), Arflane lives during a new ice age that has engulfed most of Earth and forced the surviving humans to revert to a hunting-gathering economy; he sets sails on the eponymous ice schooner to reach the fabled settlement of New York and scavenge all ancestral knowledge that could help restore human civilization. His consort is the widowed noblewoman Lady Ulssen, his weapon is a cutlass for flensing land whales, and his main companions are Lady Ulssen's cousin Manfred Rorfresne and her brother Urquhart Long-Lance.
- Artos the Celt
- Asquiol of Pompeii: the main character of the science-fiction novella "The Blood Red Game" (1963), Asquiol is leading a human colonizing force into a parallel universe and has to fight for supremacy against a hostile native species. "The Blood Red Game" was eventually combined with the earlier novella "The Sundered Worlds" (1962) into the full-length novel The Sundered Worlds (1965), making Asquiol somehow of a guest character into the Von Bek saga.
- Aubec, Earl of Malador: Aubec debuted in a 1964 short story titled either "The Dream of Earl Aubec" or "Master of Chaos" depending on the collection: he lives in the same world as Elric of Melniboné many generations before that character's birth, serves as a national champion of the human kingdom of Lormyria and is the paramour of the Lormyrian monarch, Queen Eloarde. Moorcock planned a whole series about Aubec's wars against Melniboné in order to ensure human independence, eventually reconnecting to Elric's saga as a direct prequel, but the project was eventually aborted; consequently, "The Dream of Earl Aubec" was reincorporated into Elric's series as a prologue.
- Captain Oswald Bastable: the main character and narrator of the Nomad of Time trilogy (1971–1981), Captain Bastable is an officer of the British Imperial Army stationed in the Raj in the early 20th century, until a series of time-travel incidents transports him into three different uchronias: a 1973 where the World Wars have not been fought and the British Empire is now encroached by decolonizing movements; a 1904 where Europe has been left in tatters by a precocious and even more devastating Great War; a 1941 where the British and German Empires are firmly allied. Bastable's misadventures in these alternative timelines are constructed as a biography and literary historians regard them as the prototypes of the steampunk subgenre.
- Brian
- Jherek Carnelian: one of the last humans to be alive on Earth as the Multiverse is nearing the End of Time, Carnelian is a creature of semi-divine power, hedonistic interests, and obnoxious morality (not unlike his fellow End-Timers), but his lifestyle changes forever once he falls in love with Mrs. Amelia Underwood, a time traveler from the Nineteenth Century; the couple's courtship, relationship and shared adventures across time and space are the subject of a trilogy called The Dancers at the End of Time (1972–1976); this series is complemented by the Legends at the End of Time: five semi-autonomous short stories and novelettes taking place at the End of Time, themselves composed in the late Seventies (with an additional sixth one being published in 2008). This series is characterized by a high number of cameos from other leading and supporting characters of the Eternal Champion mythos.
- Jerry Cornelius: an adventurer and dimensional traveler Moorcock created in the mid-1960s and developed for the following forty years, resulting in an early tetralogy of novels, The Cornelius Quartet (1968–1977), a ponderous collection of short fiction, The Lives and Times of Jerry Cornelius (1976), and a later hexalogy of novels, The Cornelius Calendar (composed in two stages, 1976–1981 and 2002–2008), with more tales in the working. Cornelius's saga consists of a wide array of surreal situations kept together by the character's uniquely fluid identity and it represents an influential form of experimental literature in the wider context of psychedelic counterculture. This series also includes two spin-off works, a Doctor Who licensed novel titled The Coming of the Terraphiles (2010), whose Captain Cornelius is, in fact, Jerry's incarnation in the Whoniverse; and The Distant Suns (1975), a late example of pulp space opera Moorcock co-authored with James Cawthorn, depicting Jerry as an air force Colonel and a space explorer. Moreover, it is implied that Lord Jagged of Canaria from Jherek Carnelian's series, Jaspar Colinadous from one of Elric's adventures, Dorian Hawkmoon's Jehamia Cohnahlias, Corum's Jhary-a-Conel, and John Daker's Jermays the Crooked are Jerry's counterparts in their respective dimensions. Jerry's version of the Black Sword is a Needle Gun (later morphed into a Vibragun), his Consort is his own sister Catherine (depicted as his wife in The Distant Suns, to avoid any incestuous undertones), and he has a conflictual bond with fellow dimensional adventurer Una Persson.
- Jerry Cornell: in 1966 Moorcock edited (and in fact ghost-wrote) a sizeable section of the spy novel The LSD Dossier by Roger Harris and eventually authored two novels starring Harris's original main character, secret agent Nick Allard; later on Moorcock revised his solo works into a stand-alone series centered upon Agent Jerry Cornell (1970–1980), an overt parody of character tropes and clichés from Ian Fleming's James Bond series.
- John Daker: a human implied to come from 20th-century Earth, he is forced by Balance to reincarnate into various aspects of the Champion while staying fully aware of all his identities after every transmigration. Through his own series, he takes on four different personas:
  1. Lord Erekosë: a warrior from an unspecified age of Earth's history and the only human capable of holding the radioactive sword Kunajana. At the beginning of the novella "The Eternal Champion" (1962; expanded into a novel of the same title in 1970) Erekosë has been dead for generations, but a necromantic ritual resurrects him as a new existence for John Daker; the reborn Erekosë consequently gets entangled into a world war between humans and Eldrens and into a love triangle between the two factions' princesses, Eldren Ermizhad and human Iolinda.
  2. Count Ulrik Skarlsol: once his missions as Erekosë are resolved, Daker is forcibly transferred into Count Urlik Skarsol, Lord of the Frozen Keep, a hibernated hero native to an ice-bound planet. During the novel Phoenix in Obsidian (1970) Count Urlik embarks on a quest for the mysterious "Chalice" (possibly a counterpart of the Holy Grail) and is forced to wield the Cold Sword, an extremely powerful and malevolent form of the Black Sword.
  3. Clen of Clen-Gar: Daker assumes this identity during The Swords of Heaven, the Flowers of Hell (1979), a graphic novel co-authored by Moorcock and Howard Chaykin which bridges the time gap between the second and third prose novel. Clen is a human lord of a prosperous bucolic territory called "Heaven", whose "Angel" denizens are responsible for the abysmal state of their neighboring land of "Hell"; as the two countries clash in war, Clen gets romantically involved with Lady Gradesmor from Heaven.
  4. Prince Flamadin: Flamadin is the ruler of a dimension called Draachenheem and owns both the Dragon Sword (a Black Sword comparable in power to Ulrik Skarlson's Cold Sword) and the Actoris Stone, an enchanted gem that would later become Elric of Melniboné's family heirloom. In The Dragon in the Sword (1986) Daker as Flamadin and his companion from 20th-century Germany, Ulrich von Bek, travel across many interconnected dimensions to prevent a major cataclysm.
- Elric of Melniboné: Moorcock's breakthrough character, Elric lives in a prehistorical age of Earth and is the sorcerer-emperor of the Melnibonéans, a pre-human species of Chaos-aligned feys (later retconned into being a branch of the Eldren); he wields the soul-eating sword Stormbringer, on which he is co-dependent upon due to his frail health, and spends his life trying to thwart the Chaos God Arioch, who is also his undesired personal patron due to an ancestral Melnibonéan tradition; the first and last novels in this series also feature Mournblade, Stormbringer's twin sword, which is wielded by Elric's kinsmen. In the early stages of his saga, Elric is enamored of his cousin Princess Cymoril and gets one-time help from Oone the Dreamthief, an enchantress, and Count Smiorgan, a well-known reaver; later on, he falls in love with the human aristocrat Zarozinia and casts his lot with Moonglum of Elwher, a sybaritic sellsword, and Rackhir the Red Archer, a powerful paladin of Balance. Elric's series represents a major milestone in sword & sorcery fiction and, unlike Moorcock's later works, was composed anachronically: it originally consisted of seven short stories and a serialized conclusive novel written from 1961 to 1967, but it was later expanded with three additional novels in the 1970s, two in the 1990s, and some more peripheral contents during the early 21st century.
- Franik
- Professor Faustaff: the leading character in The Wrecks of Time (1965), he is a physicist fighting the space-faring marauders known as the D-Squads in order to protect a cluster of fifteen different Earths that exist in parallel to Faustaff's own planet. The 1996 revision of The Wrecks of Time renamed Faustaff's ally Gordon Ogg into "Gordon Begg", in order to retcon him into a Von Bek and underline those character's respective status as an Eternal Champion and Companion, but this change was eventually dropped in the 2014 reprint.
- Goldberg
- Duke Dorian Hawkmoon von Köln: a German soldier in a post-nuclear Europe where magic and ancient technology coexist, Duke Hawkmoon embarks on a quest together with his retainer Oladahn to recover the fabled Runestaff (a magical talisman akin to the Holy Grail) and protect the world from the warmongering Dark Empire of Granbretan, which is ruled by the ruthless half-human half-machine King Huon; as this enterprise progresses, Hawkmoon is forced to bear the enchanted Black Jewel, a manifestation of the Black Sword, and falls in love with Yisselda of Brass, heiress of a fiefdom in the land of Kamarg. Dorian's war against Granbretan is central in the Runestaff tetralogy (1967–1969) while his family life with Yisselda serves as a backdrop to the Chronicles of Castle Brass/Count Brass trilogy (1973–1975), which culminates into a crossover with Elric's, Daker's, and Corum's respective series.
- Ilanth
- Queen Ilian of Garathorm: one of the very few female Championesses, she teams up with Duke Hawkmoon once he travels to her own world during his sixth novel, The Champion of Garathorm.
- Karl Glogauer: a hedonist and a hippie with a countercultural background, Glogauer debuts in the novella "Behold the Man" (1966; expanded into a novel of the same title in 1969), in which he time-travels to Roman Palestine so that he can meet Jesus Christ; the later novel Breakfast in the Ruins (1972) details the character's gay romances and hallucinatory experiences in contemporary London. He also cameos in Jerry Cornelius's adventures.
- Corum Jhaelen Irsei: a prince of the Vadhagh, a Law-aligned branch of the Eldren people, Corum effectively becomes the last of his kin after a disastrous war against the Mabden, a species created by Chaos of which Homo sapiens is the Terran variant. After a period of thralldom, the mutilation of his left hand and right eye, and their replacement with magical prosthetics (hence his alias as Corum Llaw Ereint, "Corum of the Silver Hand"), the former prince rises in rebellion against his captors and wages a veritable crusade against Chaos, which takes place both in Corum's own age during the Swords trilogy (1971) and in a distant future during the Silver Hand trilogy (1973–1974). As his vendetta unfolds, Corum pursues troubled romances with two human women, Rhalina and Medhbh, and is reliably backed by Jhary-a-Conel, a well-versed dimensional traveler who occasionally supports Hawkmoon as well. Notice that Corum's name is an anagram of "Jeremiah Cornelius".
- Jack Karaquazian: a leading character in the Second Ether trilogy (1995–1996), which depicts the power struggles between god-like beings (such as Karaquazian himself) of Lawful, Chaotic and neutral affiliation to take control of Balance and swing it their own respective way. Jack is involved in an entangled love affair with his Consort Colinda Dovero, his Companion Sam Oakenhurst, and Sam's other love interest Rose von Bek.
- Michael Kane of Old Mars: the hero of a 1965 trilogy of novels, Michael Kane is a human scientist from Earth transported to a fictional version of Mars, where he gets embroiled in swashbuckling adventures and court intrigues, including a romance with Martian queen Shizala. Kane is constructed as an explicit homage and throwback to the planetary romance subgenre and, more specifically, to John Carter of Mars by Edgar Rice Burroughs; in turn, the biographical style of the trilogy represents a direct antecedent to Oswald Bastable's saga.
- Clovis Marca: the leading character in The Shores of Death (1966), Marca is one of the last human denizens of a future Earth which stopped rotating and is now split into diurnal and nocturnal hemispheres; he embarks on a quest to cure humankind's severe sterility and grant his species a future. The 1996 revision of The Shores of Death renamed Marca into "Clovis Becker" in order to retcon him into a distant Von Bek, but this change was eventually dropped in the 2014 reprint.
- Mejink-La-Kos
- M'v Okom Sebpt O'Riley, Gunholder of the Qui Lors Ventures: another female Championess, she wields the Black Sword under the guise of a soul-eating pistol, the Banning Gun. She acts as a mentor to Eric Beck in Elric: The Balance Lost.
- Oshbek-Uy
- Pournachas
- Alan Powys: the leading character in The Winds of Limbo (1965), Powys is a state functionary in a distant future where humankind has retreated underground under the stewardship of a despotic government; he strives to protect his home country from a space terrorist known as "The Fireclown". The 1996 revision of The Winds of Limbo renamed Powys into "Alain von Bek" in order to retcon him into a distant Von Bek, but this change was eventually dropped in the 2014 reprint.
- Colonel Maxim Arturovitch "Pyat" Pyatnitski: possibly the only Champion whose adventures are fully mimetic rather than fantastical, Colonel Pyat is a long-lived Russian aristocrat and military man born on 1 January 1900. He spends his life traveling across the globe and getting entangled into all sorts of high-level political intrigues, effectively shaping the fates of Earth before, during, and after the World Wars, his only stable human connection being his lover Honoria Cornelius, Jerry's mother. Moorcock originally created Pyat as a supporting character in Jerry Cornelius's series and eventually fleshed him out in the Pyat Quartet (1981–2006); this series is structured it as a self-celebratory four-volume autobiography by the Colonel himself, with Moorcock acting as an editor.
- Ryan: the lead character of The Black Corridor (1969), Ryan lives in a dystopian future of rampaging xenophobia, nuclear warfare and societal collapse; he commandeers the interstellar spaceship Hope Dempsy and tries to bring a rag-tag group of refugees to safety.
- The "Scar-Faced Brooder" or "Cronarch": a character from Moorcock's juvenile novelettes The Time Dweller (1964) and Escape from Evening (1965), dealing with the state of human society in a dying Earth scenario.
- Shaleen
- Sojan the Swordsman: Moorcock's first original character and a prototype to the Eternal Champion concept, Sojan is a deceased Terran who reincarnates on the planet Zylor and embarks on a series of picaresque adventures; interestingly, while he does wield a sword and a pneumatic gun, his actual signature weapon is a shield (hence the moniker of "Sojan Shieldbearer"). Sojan's adventures first appeared around 1955 as a 23 part serial on the Burroughsania fanzine, which Moorcock had been contributing to, were reprinted for profit in Tarzan Adventures between 1957 and 1958, and they were eventually fixed-up in book form in 1977; finally, the 2013 edition combined this serial together with other sword-and-planet short fiction focusing on Dek of Noothar, Klan the Spoiler, and Rens Karto of Bersnol.
- Umpata
- Ghardas Valabasian, Conqueror of the Distant Suns
- Graf Ulrich von Bek: a German soldier fighting in the Thirty Years' War, Graf Ulrich is the leading character of the historical fantasy novel The War Hound and the World's Pain (1981), in which he strikes a deal with the Devil and takes upon his family the duty of locating and guarding the Holy Grail; his Companion and Consort in this adventure are Gurni Gurnisson and Sabrina. Graf Ulrich's actions reverberate through space and time by making the von Beks aware of the Multiverse, the designated owners of the sword Ravenbrand (which is, in fact, Mournblade from Elric's series), and uniquely attuned to magic and dimensional travel, so that different members of the bloodline are involved in many other sagas and stand-alone episodes of the Eternal Champion mythos.
  Ulrich von Bek and his descendants are a somewhat unusual family in Moorcock's works, as they function both as an aspect of the Eternal Champion and as a companion to him. The family is considered to be the current Keeper of the Holy Grail. The von Bek family motto is "Do you the Devil's work", a nod to the relationship that the family developed with Lucifer in The War Hound and the World's Pain.
  - Manfred von Bek: the main character of The City in the Autumn Stars (1986), a direct sequel to The War Hound and the World's Pain, Manfred carries on Graf Ulrich's quest for the Grail as Europe is engulfed by the French Revolution; he is aided by the Duchess of Crete, Libussa Cartagena y Mendoza-Chilperic. Due to their shared main plotline, The War Hound and the World's Pain and The City in the Autumn Stars are usually collected together as the core of the "Von Bek saga".
  - Renark von Bek: a citizen of humankind's stellar empire established in the aftermath of World War Three, Renark is tasked with traveling to a secluded dimension known as the Sundered Worlds so that he can stabilize the Multiverse and prevent its untimely collapse. He is the lead character in the novella "The Sundered Worlds" (1962), which was eventually combined with "The Blood Red Game" (1963) into the full-length novel The Sundered Worlds (1965).
  - Rose von Bek: the last survivor of a militant order devoted to Balance, she was originally known as "The Rose", but married into the von Bek family and kept the surname after her divorce. She is the titular coprotagonist in Elric's novel The Revenge of the Rose (1991) and a leading character in the Second Ether trilogy. While no Championess herself, her cosmic power is comparable to that of the various Champions. Her signature weapons are the sword Swift Thorn and the dagger Little Thorn.
  - Ulrich von Bek: a direct descendant of Graf Ulrich, he rebels against Adolf Hitler and escapes death by serving as an Eternal Companion to John Daker once the latter incarnates into Prince Flamadin during The Dragon in the Sword.
  - Ulric von Bek: a distinct character from the former (notice the h-less spelling of his name), he too opposes the Third Reich together with his wife Oona von Bek, a half-human half-Melnibonéan hybrid and daughter of Elric, who has relocated to 20th-century Germany. Ulric and Oona are the leading characters of the Moonbeam Roads Trilogy (2001–2005), an explicit crossover between Elric's saga and the Von Beks'.
  - Count Ulrich Rudric Renark Otto von Bek-Krasny, also known as "Zenith the Albino": an Eternal Champion existing on 20th-century Earth and most likely a reincarnated Elric of Melniboné, since his Black Sword is Stormbringer itself; he is a criminal mastermind and is perpetually engaged into a cat-and-mouse game against his distant cousin Sir Seaton Begg, a British "metatemporal detective" belonging to the English branch of the dynasty. Zenith and Begg's shared adventure were composed anachronically and collected for the first time in The Metatemporal Detective (2007), while some of them had already appeared in the second volume of the Second Ether series, Fabulous Harbours (1995).
  - Eric Beck: the main character of the graphic novel Elric: The Balance Lost (2011–2012), he is an Eternal Champion living on 21st Century Earth and gets dragged into an ensemble adventure together with Elric, Hawkmoon, Corum, Oswald Bastable, and the cast of the Second Ether series. His Black Sword is a Japanese katana named Murakamo-No-Tsurugi ("Sword of the Gathering Clouds"). He is a collateral member of the Von Bek dynasty through the Begg lineage (originally, van Beek).
  - Karol von Bek: the melancholy Duke of Waldenstein (mentioned in "The Citadel of Forgotten Myths")

In addition to Moorcock's own creations, a number of references through his works have stated that Ulysses and Roland have been Earth's Eternal Champions as well.

== Publishing history ==
=== The Tale of the Eternal Champion ===
Between 1992 and 1993 Moorcock partnered with British publisher Millenium (later absorbed into the Orion Publishing Group) to print a multi-volume collection of all novels and short stories belonging to the Eternal Champion sequence, under the moniker of "The Tale of the Eternal Champion"; starting from 1994 and up to 2000, a parallel project simply called "The Eternal Champion" was undertaken by White Wolf Publishing for the North American market, but each of the two series ended up including some contents left out of its counterpart due to licensing issues, while certain works could not make into the collection whatsoever. This publishing operation represented Moorcock's first attempt to systematize his magnum opus both in terms of editorial uniformity and textual revisions.

The following table and paragraph list the full contents of both the European and North American versions of the collection. It should be noticed that the Orion collection was arranged according to Moorcock's then-preferred reading order, which was altered in the White Wolf version.

The Tale of the Eternal Champion
	Millenium/Orion	White Wolf
1.	Von Bek	The Eternal Champion
2.	The Eternal Champion	Von Bek
3.	Hawkmoon	Hawkmoon
4.	Corum	A Nomad of the Time Streams: A Scientific Romance
5.	Sailing to Utopia	Elric: Song of the Black Sword
6.	A Nomad of the Time Streams	The Roads Between the Worlds
7.	The Dancers at the End of Time	Corum: The Coming of Chaos
8.	Elric of Melniboné	Sailing to Utopia
9.	The New Nature of the Catastrophe	Kane of Old Mars
10.	The Prince with the Silver Hand	The Dancers at the End of Time
11.	Legends from the End of Time	Elric: The Stealer of Souls
12.	Stormbringer	Corum: The Prince with the Silver Hand
13.	Earl Aubec and Other Stories	Legends from the End of Time
14.	Count Brass	Earl Aubec and Other Stories
15.		Count Brass

Both versions of the collection included Elric's saga, Corum's hexalogy, Hawkmoon's heptalogy, and the End of Time series as two-volumes sets and devoted one volume each to John Daker's trilogy, Captain Bastable's trilogy, and the von Bek duology (which was complemented by the detective short story "The Pleasure Garden of Felipe Sagittarius"); Sailing to Utopia was a thematical anthology combining The Ice Schooner, The Distant Suns, The Black Corridor and the novella "Flux", and likewise Earl Aubec and Other Stories collected thirty-three works of short fiction from across Moorcock's production, among them the two short stories focussing on the Scared-Face Brooder and the short novels The Golden Barge and My Experiences in the Third World War.

As for region-exclusive contents, the European-only The New Nature of the Catastrophe was an anthology of short fiction centered upon Jerry Cornelius, expanding upon the earlier collection The Lives and Times of Jerry Cornelius, whereas the North American-only Kane of Old Mars collected Michael Kane's trilogy. Moreover, White Wolf Publishing did secure the rights over the stand-alone science fiction novels The Sundered World, The Wrecks of Time, The Winds of Limbo, and The Shores of Death, but their inclusion came at the expense of Moorcock's preferred reading order: The Sundered World was inserted into John Daker's volume as an interlude between that character's first and second novel; Daker's third novel was moved into the von Bek volume as a coda; and The Wrecks of Time, The Winds of Limbo, and The Shores of Death were collected into the thematical anthology The Roads Between the Worlds, which interconnected the three novels through an original framing device.

It is also worth mentioning that the first edition of the Second Ether trilogy was published by Millenium itself right after "The Tale of the Eternal Champion" was completed, and that while Jerry Cornelius's and Karl Glogauer's novels were not formally included in the series, nonetheless they were still being distributed in the UK by Orion under its Phoenix House imprint, together with Moorcock's non-Champion novels Gloriana; or, the Unfulfill'd Queen and The Brothel in Rosenstrasse. As a result, Jerry Cornell's duology was the only series in the Eternal Champion mythos not to be included in either collection, nor officially nor informally.

=== The Michael Moorcock Collection ===
Moorcock's second attempt to systematize the Eternal Champion corpus took place between 2013 and 2015, once Victor Gollancz Ltd (another imprint of the Orion conglomerate) secured the rights for all of his fantasy and science-fiction works and consequently reprinted them in a cohesive series, labeled as "The Michael Moorcock Collection"; as of 2021, these Gollancz editions represent the most updated versions of Moorcock's opus, due to their contents having been jointly revised by the author and his bibliographer John Davey into a definitive textual rendition. This publication included both all of the author's full-length novels and a selection of short fiction and was eventually complemented by two stand-alone series collecting the author's non-Champion sagas, the London Sequence and The Sanctuary of the White Friars.

The following table and paragraph list the full contents of the collection.

The Michael Moorcock Collection
	Volume	Contents
1.	Elric of Melniboné and Other Stories	"Master of Chaos" (1964), Moorcock's original script for the graphic novel Elric: The Making of a Sorcerer (2005), Elric of Melniboné (1972)
2.	Elric: The Fortress of the Pearl	The Fortress of the Pearl (1989)
3.	Elric: The Sailor on the Seas of Fate	The Sailor on the Seas of Fate (1976), "The Dreaming City" (1961), "A Portrait in Ivory" (2007), "While the Gods Laugh" (1961), "The Singing Citadel" (1967)
4.	Elric: The Sleeping Sorceress	"The Eternal Champion" (1962), "The Greater Conqueror" (1963), The Sleeping Sorceress (1971), "The Stone Thing: A Tale of Strange Parts" (1974), "Sir Milk-and-Blood" (1996), "The Roaming Forest: A Tale of the Red Archer" (2006), "The Flaneur des Arcades de l'Opera" (2007). All content but the titular novel is miscellaneous short fiction only passingly related to Elric's series.
5.	Elric: The Revenge of the Rose	The Revenge of the Rose (1991), "The Stealer of Souls" (1962), "Kings in Darkness" (1962), "The Caravan of Forgotten Dreams" (1962), "The Last Enchantment" (1962), "To Rescue Tanelorn..." (1962)
6.	Elric: Stormbringer!	Stormbringer (1963–1964)
7.	Elric: The Moonbeam Roads	Daughter of Dreams (originally titled The Dreamthief's Daughter, 2001), Destiny's Brother (originally titled The Skrayling Tree, 2003), Son of the Wolf (originally titled The White Wolf's Son, 2003)
8.	Corum: The Prince in the Scarlet Robe	The Knight of the Swords (1971), The Queen of the Swords (1971), The King of the Swords (1971)
9.	Corum: The Prince with the Silver Hand	The Bull and the Spear (1973), The Oak and the Ram (1973), The Sword and the Stallion (1974)
10.	Hawkmoon: The History of the Runestaff	The Jewel in the Skull (1967), The Mad God's Amulet (1968), The Sword of the Dawn (1968), The Runestaff (1969)
11.	Hawkmoon: Count Brass	Count Brass (1973), The Champion of Garathorm (1973), The Quest for Tanelorn (1975)
12.	The Cornelius Quartet	The Final Programme (1968), A Cure for Cancer (1971), The English Assassin (1972), The Condition of Muzak (1977)
13.	Jerry Cornelius: His Lives and His Times	Expanded revision of The Lives and Times of Jerry Cornelius (1976)
14.	A Cornelius Calendar	The Adventures of Una Persson and Catherine Cornelius in the Twentieth Century (1976), The Entropy Tango (1981), The Great Rock 'n' Roll Swindle (1980), The Alchemist's Question (1984), Firing the Cathedral (2002), Modern Times 2.0 (2008)
15.	Von Bek	The War Hound and the World's Pain (1981), The City in the Autumn Stars (1986)
16.	The Eternal Champion	The Eternal Champion: A Fantastic Romance (1970), Phoenix in Obsidian (1970), The Dragon in the Sword (1986)
17.	The Dancers at the End of Time	An Alien Heat (1972), The Hollow Lands (1974), The End of All Songs (1976)
18.	Kane of Old Mars	City of the Beast (1965), Lord of the Spiders (1965), Masters of the Pit (1965)
19.	Moorcock's Multiverse	The Sundered Worlds (1965), The Winds of Limbo (1969; a revised version of The Fireclown, 1965), The Shores of Death (originally titled The Twilight Man, 1966)
20.	The Nomad of Time: A Scientific Romance	The Warlord of the Air (1971), The Land Leviathan (1974), The Steel Tsar (1981)
21.	Travelling to Utopia	The Wrecks of Time (1967), The Ice Schooner (1969), The Black Corridor (1969)
22.	The War Amongst the Angels	Blood: A Southern Fantasy (1994), Fabulous Harbours (1995), The War Amongst The Angels (1996)
23.	Tales from the End of Time	Pale Roses (1976), White Star (1976), Ancient Shadows (1976), Constant Fire (1977), Elric at the End of Time (1981), Sumptuous Dress (2008)
24.	Behold the Man	Behold the Man (1969)
25.	Gloriana; or, The Unfulfill'd Queen	Gloriana; or, The Unfulfill'd Queen (1978)
26.	My Experiences in the Third World War and Other Stories	My Experiences in the Third World War (1979–1989), "The Mountain" (1964), "The Deep Fix" (1964), "The Frozen Cardinal" (1987), "Wolf" (1966), "The Pleasure Garden of Felipe Sagittarius" (1965), "The Real-Life Mr Newman" (1966), "The Cairene Purse" (1990)
27.	The Brothel in Rosenstrasse and Other Stories	The Brothel in Rosenstrasse (1982), "The Opium General" (1984), "London Bone" (1997), "A Winter Admiral" (1994), "Doves in the Circle" (1997), "A Slow Saturday Night at the Surrealist Sporting Club" (2001)
28.	Breakfast in the Ruins and Other Stories	Breakfast in the Ruins (1972), "The Time Dweller" (1964), "Escape from Evening" (1965), "A Dead Singer" (1974), "London Flesh" (2006), "Behold the Man" (1966).

The Collection was further complemented by five digital-only releases:

- Jerry Cornell's series:
  1. The Chinese Agent (1970)
  2. The Russian Intelligence (1980)
- The Golden Barge (1979, but originally composed in 1958)
- Sojan the Swordsman (1977, but originally composed in 1954–1958)
- The Distant Suns (1975, but originally composed in 1969)

As of 2021, Gollancz has not yet acquired the rights for the Pyat Quartet, consisting of:

1. Byzantium Endures (1981)
2. The Laughter of Carthage (1984)
3. Jerusalem Commands (1992)
4. The Vengeance of Rome (2006)

== See also ==
- The Hero with a Thousand Faces: an anthropological essay on the narrative structures of myths by influential scholar Joseph Campbell and a prominent source of literary inspiration for Moorcock's generation.
