= Una Persson =

Fictional character in novels by Michael Moorcock

Una Persson is a recurring character in many of Michael Moorcock's 'multiverse' novels. She has also been used as a character in stories by other writers. She was the character Moorcock chose to start a round-robin story in The Guardian.

Often appearing as a cool, anarchistic revolutionary in the many alternate histories, futures and worlds created by Moorcock, she is bisexual in her private life, having been the lover of both Jerry and Catherine Cornelius. In some ways a more dedicated, less dissolute female version of Jerry Cornelius, she is revealed in The Condition of Muzak as playing the role Harlequin. In The End of All Songs she appears as a member of the "Guild of Temporal Adventurers".

She has appeared in the Jerry Cornelius novels A Cure for Cancer, The English Assassin, The Condition of Muzak and The Adventures of Una Persson and Catherine Cornelius in the Twentieth Century. She was in all three of the Nomad of the Time Streams trilogy - The Warlord of the Air, The Land Leviathan and The Steel Tsar, appeared in the Elizabethan alternative history novel Gloriana as Una of Scaith, and in the later Elric novel The Fortress of the Pearl she appeared as Oone the Dreamthief. As Oone she has a child with Elric of Melniboné she names Oona, who eventually becomes the parent of Oona Von Bek with Ulrich Von Bek in The Dreamthief's Daughter.

She also features as a character in Dancers at the End of Time, "Elric at the End of Time", The Alchemist's Question, The Entropy Tango and in the short stories "Second Gibraltar" by Chris Reed and "The Great Counterfeit Memory Sin-Drome" by Andrew Darlington. She appears in "The Murderer's Song", The Gangrene Collection, The Roumanian Question and in Everything Blowing Up: An Adventure of Una Persson by Hilary Bailey.

She appears in several of The Metatemporal Detective stories including "The Mystery of the Texas Twister", "The Affair of the Bassin Les Hivers" and "The Flaneur des Arcades de l’Opera". Persson is also a protagonist in The White Wolf's Son, "The Spencer Inheritance", "The Camus Referendum" and "Firing the Cathedral".

She is also mentioned, although does not appear in her own right, in stories and novels such as "Pale Roses", "White Stars", The Transformation of Miss Mavis Ming, Blood: A Southern Fantasy, The War Amongst the Angels by Moorcock as well as Giants in the Earth by Caitlin R. Kiernan and Angel of War by James Lovegrove. In The Revenge of the Rose Onna Peerthorn is the name of a boat. Naturally her name was on the guest list in The Reunion Party.

== Sources ==
- Magill's Guide to Science Fiction and Fantasy Literature by T. A. Shippey
- Survey of Science Fiction Literature by Frank Northern Magill
- Sequels, an Annotated Guide to Novels in Series by Janet Husband.
- Tale of the Future, from the Beginning to the Present Day by Ignatius Frederick Clarke
- New Wave: Die Avantgarde der modernen Anglo-amerikanischen Science Fiction? by Heinrich Keim
- Trajectories of the Fantastic by Michael A. Morrison
- The Ultimate Guide to Science Fiction by David Pringle
- Encyclopedia of Homosexuality by Wayne R. Dynes, Warren Johansson, William A. Percy, Stephen R. Donaldson
- Science Fiction: The Illustrated Encyclopedia by John Clute
- The Science Fiction Source Book by David Wingrove
- Imaginary People: A Who's who of Modern Fictional Characters by David Pringle
- The New Encyclopedia of Science Fiction by James E. Gunn
