= The Cornelius Quartet =

Novel quartet by Michael Moorcock

- Cover from the first edition.
- Author: Michael Moorcock
- Original title: The Cornelius Chronicles
- Language: English
- Series: Jerry Cornelius
- Genre: Literary fiction
- Publisher: Avon Books
- Publication date: 1977
- Publication place: United States
- Media type: Print (paperback)
- Pages: 974 pp
- ISBN: 0-380-00878-5
- OCLC: 3893119
- Dewey Decimal: 823/.9/14
- LC Class: PZ4.M8185 Cq 1977 PR6063.O59

The Cornelius Quartet is the collective name for the Jerry Cornelius novels by Michael Moorcock, although the first one-volume edition was entitled The Cornelius Chronicles. It is composed of The Final Programme, A Cure for Cancer, The English Assassin and The Condition of Muzak. The collection has remained continuously in print for 30 years.

== Setting and genre ==
The four novels are set in an ever shifting, yet always fashionable, alternate "multiverse" of anarchist revolutionaries and English popart turmoil. They chart the adventures of a wide range of recurring characters, notably Jerry Cornelius and his sister Catherine, Una Persson and Colonel Pyat. The books are neither straight science fiction nor pure fantasy, Moorcock himself commented: "Much of my work borrowed from the iconography and vocabulary of science fiction in the 1960s but I would not, for instance, classify the Jerry Cornelius tetralogy as a genre work".

== Reception ==
The Complete Review said that it comprised "an arc of Jerry Cornelius-adventures, from the (fairly) straightforward action-adventure of the first, The Final Programme, to the metaphysical summa of The Condition of Muzak". It observes that "Cornelius is a superhero, but a flawed one. He is indestructible and yet has weaknesses. He is both a former Jesuit and a physicist. Party-animal and solitary soul. By the end of the tetralogy he is a messiah – yet another role he is not ideally suited for".

Reviewing the 974-page volume, Matthew Wolf-Meyer noted its influence on a host of contemporary artists in music and literature, writing that:

It would be impossible to deny the profound influences that Michael Moorcock's Jerry Cornelius novels have had, not only on the genres of science fiction and fantasy, but also popular music, film, and television. Or it might simply be that Moorcock was so perfectly in tune with the advent of postmodernism that he anticipated in his writing, in his mood, what was to come, and all the material that seems to derive from The Cornelius Quartet, in actuality, derives from the zeitgeist instead. In reading the collection, for the reader at the cusp of the 21st century, it acts as a historical piece, positing the genealogical influence of a series of more contemporary works, from Bryan Talbot's graphic novel Heart of Empire to David Bowie's album Outside; Jerry Cornelius is that common source for much of contemporary postmodern (British) popular art

== Moorcock on Cornelius ==
Moorcock wrote "A note on the Jerry Cornelius Tetralogy" in 1976 in which he outlined the 'disciplined logic' which underpinned the work as a unified whole.

Part of my original intention with the Jerry Cornelius stories was to 'liberate' the narrative; to leave it open to the reader's interpretation as much as possible – to involve the reader in such a way as to bring their own imagination into play. This impulse was probably a result of my interest in Brecht – an interest I'd had since the mid-fifties.

Although the structure of the tetralogy is very strict (some might think over-mechanical) the scope for interpretation is hopefully much wider than the conventional novel. The underlying logic is also very disciplined, particularly in the last three volumes. It's my view that a work of fiction should contain nothing which does not contribute to the overall scheme. The whimsicalities to be found in all the books are, in fact, not random, not mere conceits, but make internal references. That is to say, while I strive for the effect of randomness on one level, the effect is achieved by a tightly controlled system of internal reference, puns, ironies, logic-jumps which no single reader may fairly be expected to follow

In an interview for The Zone science fiction magazine, Moorcock later commented that the stories in the Cornelius saga were "more criticism and commentary on their times than they were celebration, I knew there wasn't enough hard political infrastructure to make the sentiment come true. I said while it was happening that I knew it was a Golden Age. I sensed it couldn't last".

== Publication history ==
The collection was first published as The Cornelius Chronicles in 1977 by Avon Books and a revised version under this title appeared in 1979 with an introduction by John Clute. It first appeared under the title of The Cornelius Quartet in 1993 in Britain and 2001 in the United States. It was published as Les Aventures de Jerry Cornelius in France. The current (2001) American edition ISBN 978-1-56858-183-5 was published by Four Walls Eight Windows in June 2001. The collection was republished in 2013 by Gollancz with some further revisions.
