= Fireclown =

Fireclown may refer to:

- The Fireclown, a 1965 science fiction novel by Michael Moorcock
- "Fireclown", a song by Tygers of Pan Tang from the 1980 album Wild Cat
