= Gloriana (novel) =

1978 novel by Michael Moorcock

- Dust-jacket from the first edition
- Author: Michael Moorcock
- Cover artist: Jill Riches
- Language: English
- Genre: Fantasy novel
- Publisher: Allison & Busby
- Publication date: 1978
- Publication place: United Kingdom
- Media type: Print (hardback)
- Pages: 348 pp
- ISBN: 0-85031-237-X
- OCLC: 4332081
- Dewey Decimal: 823/.9/14
- LC Class: PZ4.M8185 Gl 1978 PR6063.O59

Gloriana, or The Unfulfill'd Queen is a work of literary fantasy by British novelist Michael Moorcock. It was first published in 1978 (London: Allison & Busby) and has remained in print ever since.

== Genre ==
On the novel's title page and on its original cover, Moorcock calls Gloriana a romance and, indeed, its setting and characters resemble those of that popular literary genre of the Medieval and Renaissance periods—an imagined time of quests, jousts, and masques. Moorcock based his novel on elements of Edmund Spenser's The Faerie Queene, an allegorical epic poem of the 1590s that praises Queen Elizabeth I in the character of Gloriana, queen of a mythical "Fairyland". But Gloriana is an anti-romance, "more a dialogue with Spenser of The Faerie Queene than a description of my own ideal State", according to Moorcock.

== Setting ==
Moorcock reimagines the realm of Queen Elizabeth I and her early modern England as that of Queen Gloriana I of Albion, ruler of an empire stretching from "Hindustan" and "Cathay" to the "great continent of Virginia (and Kansas)". The era is a century after the time of Elizabeth I: "I wrote the book as if it was being written in the late 17th century, closer to Defoe than Shakespeare, drawing on language and understanding from that far forward, as it were", says Moorcock. Yuletide and Twelfth Night are celebrated within a pagan spirituality and pantheon that includes Mithras, Thor, and Zeus. Albion's capital is "Troynovante" (New Troy), which is an allusion to sixteenth-century mythologies about the alleged initial settlement of England by descendants of the sacked classical kingdom of Troy.

Albion's world is one of many parallel worlds of which Gloriana's people are just learning. Her Councillor of Philosophy, Doctor John Dee, tells her, "There are other Glorianas, other Dees, other Lord Chancellors, no doubt", from other spheres, perhaps separated by layers of ether. Gloriana's Thane of Hermiston has travelled to some of them, and Albion has been visited from other spheres by such as Cagliostro and Adolphus Hiddler, an Austrian who claimed to have conquered his own world.

The novel's atmosphere owes something to English writer Mervyn Peake's Gormenghast novels, published in the 1940s and 1950s, and Moorcock dedicated Gloriana to the memory of Peake, one of his literary heroes. Similar to the castle-city of Gormenghast, Gloriana's palace is riddled with abandoned chambers, apartments, hallways, passages, balconies, stairways, and caverns—"the walls"—within which live an underground community of runaways, escapees, and vagrants.

== Characters ==
As in Spenser's allegory, certain of Moorcock's characters resemble real personages. Gloriana's Lord Chancellor, Perion Montfallcon, brings to mind Elizabeth's chief minister, William Cecil, 1st Baron Burghley; and Gloriana's swashbuckling privateer Sir Thomasin Ffyne takes after Elizabeth's maritime explorer and Favourite, Sir Walter Raleigh. The only character drawn from actual history is Gloriana's philosopher, Doctor Dee, who shares his royal position with Elizabeth I's court astrologer, also called John Dee.

At the center of attention is the 6-foot, 6-inch, flame-haired Empress Gloriana I. She is daughter to the tyrannical and syphilitic King Hern VI—an echo and darker version of Elizabeth I's father, King Henry VIII. Hern VI even raped his own daughter. She is the antithesis of the "Virgin Queen" Elizabeth I. Where Elizabeth was cool, self-controlled, and pragmatic, kind-hearted Gloriana is often overwhelmed by loneliness and despair, a slave to passions she can neither renounce or satisfy. By day a serene and benevolent monarch, by night the lonely queen is a bisexual adventurer who seeks release in all manner of debauchery but is always anorgasmic, perhaps due to Hern's aforementioned sexual abuse. She is the mother of nine bastard daughters fathered by nine different paramours. Behind the veneer of a new Golden Age, she suffocates under the burden of her duty and her enormous private distress.

The queen's best friend and confidante is Countess Una of Scaith. Described as "intelligent and warm", Una is a cheerful, adventurous noblewoman from the far north who bears at least a passing resemblance to Mary Queen of Scots. But unlike the real Elizabeth and her Scottish rival, Gloriana and Una are inseparable friends who do everything together. Una is also the queen's lover, though unlike her other lovers, she has a close place by Gloriana's side in the daytime as well. Countess Una appears to be an alternate version of Una Persson, a significant protagonist in Moorcock's Jerry Cornelius series.

Gloriana's downfall comes in the form of a bisexual assassin and spy, antihero Captain Arturo Quire. Elizabethan England certainly had its own Quires, but he is a character drawn not from history but from Moorcock's imagination.

== Plot ==
The novel's plot concerns Lord Montfallcon and his contest for courtly influence against Captain Quire. Each man exploits Albion's shadowy network of espionage and deceit for his own ends, with Gloriana caught in the middle.

Montfallcon has maintained peace throughout Gloriana's 13-year reign using terror, oppression, and a network of informants. He is the power behind Gloriana's throne, one of the few survivors of King Hern's court, where he saw most of his family killed to entertain that tyrant king. Montfallcon's sole purpose in life is to keep Gloriana's Albion free of tyranny and corruption but, in so doing, he repeats the worst practices of Hern's henchmen. His own best henchman is Quire.

But when Quire feels Montfallcon has insulted him, he seeks revenge through seducing the frustrated Gloriana. He goes into the walls to spy on the court, to muster the rabble there into his personal army, and to make sorties into the court to commit murders and leave evidence that points to other courtiers. Finally Quire exits the walls and claims the role of Gloriana's court champion, later her lord chancellor, and ultimately her lover—threatening her place as sovereign and symbol of Albion. Ultimately, Una and Gloriana discover Flaya, Gloriana's long-lost mother, thought to have been murdered by Hern VI during one of his episodes of insanity, but still alive in an unexplored dungeon adjunct to the castle. After killing his insane daughter, Montfallcon battles Quire in a duel, leading to Montfallcon's death. Able to provide the queen with an orgasm, Quire ultimately weds her, serving as her new consort, Prince Arthur.

== Controversy ==
Moorcock was criticized for Gloriana's original ending, in which Quire raped Gloriana to 'arouse' her, which led to feminist criticism of his work. Due to strong friendship with stalwart anti-pornography feminist Andrea Dworkin, he later altered the ending to reflect contemporary feminist-inflected comprehension of women's sexuality and eroticism. In the altered ending, Quire seduces and has consensual sex with Gloriana and does not rape her.

== Editions ==
- First edition (1978). Allison & Busby. ISBN 0-85031-237-X.
- Paperback edition (1979). Avon. ISBN 0-380-42986-1. This edition includes cover art and inside illustrations by Elizabeth Malczynski www.thedragonstudio.com
- Revised edition (1993). Phoenix. ISBN 1-85799-041-2. This edition includes a revised penultimate chapter, which originally included a rape that Moorcock later feared might be used to justify the act of rape.
- Edition with author's "Afterword" (2004). Aspect. ISBN 0-446-69140-2. This edition includes both the original and the revised endings, as well as an afterword in which Moorcock provides some background on his writing of the novel and explains his reasons for revising its ending in 1993.

== Awards ==
- 2009 Winner of the Inaugural Moorcock Chalice, 1st place
- 1978 World Fantasy Award, 1st place
- 1979 John W. Campbell Memorial Award for Best Science Fiction Novel, 1st place
- 1979 British Fantasy Award, 3rd place

== Music ==
In 2008, The Entropy Tango & Gloriana Demo Sessions by Michael Moorcock & The Deep Fix was released. These were sessions for planned albums based on two Moorcock novels: Gloriana and The Entropy Tango. Two of the Gloriana tracks ("Inglesborough"and "Montfallcon") were reworked with additional musicians and appeared on the Spirits Burning CD Alien Injection, also released in 2008.
