= The Glamour Chase =

2010 novel by Gary Russell

- Author: Gary Russell
- Series: Doctor Who book: New Series Adventures
- Release number: 42
- Subject: Featuring: Eleventh Doctor; Amy Pond; Rory Williams
- Publisher: BBC Books
- Publication date: 22 July 2010
- Pages: 245
- Preceded by: The King's Dragon
- Followed by: The Coming of the Terraphiles

The Glamour Chase is a book in the Doctor Who New Series Adventures collection, and is the sixth novel to feature the Eleventh Doctor. It saw the reappearance of the Glamour which debuted in Ghosts of India.

== Plot ==
An Archaeological dig in 1936 unearths relics of another time... and, as The Doctor, Amy and Rory realise, another place. Another planet. But if Enola Porter, noted adventuress, has really found evidence of an alien civilisation, how come she isn't famous? Why has Rory never heard of her? Added to that, since Amy's been traveling with him for a while now, why does she now think The Doctor is from Mars? As the ancient spaceship re-activates, the Doctor discovers that nothing and no-one can be trusted. The things that seem most real could actually be literal fabrications - and very deadly indeed. Who can the Doctor believe when no one is what they seem? And how can he defeat an enemy who can bend matter itself at its will? For the Doctor, Amy and Rory - and all of humanity - the buried secrets of the past are very much a threat to the present.

== Characters ==
- The Eleventh Doctor
- Amy Pond
- Rory Williams
- Enola Porter
- Nathaniel Porter
- Oliver Marks
- Daisy Conlan
- Owain
- Nancy Thirman
