= The Lives and Times of Jerry Cornelius =

1976 collection of short stories by Michael Moorcock

- Dust-jacket from the first edition.
- Author: Michael Moorcock
- Cover artist: Richard Glyn Jones
- Language: English
- Series: Jerry Cornelius
- Genre: Science fiction
- Publisher: Allison & Busby
- Publication date: 1976
- Publication place: United Kingdom
- Media type: Print (hardback)
- Pages: 224 pp
- ISBN: 0-85031-141-1
- OCLC: 2615688
- Dewey Decimal: 823/.9/14
- LC Class: PZ4.M8185 Li PR6063.O59

The Lives and Times of Jerry Cornelius is a collection of short stories by British fantasy and science fiction writer Michael Moorcock. It is part of his long-running Jerry Cornelius series. The book was originally published by Allison & Busby in 1976 and collects stories originally published between 1969 and 1974. A later edition was published in 2003 by Four Walls Eight Windows, in which four stories from the original edition are replaced.

== Contents ==
=== Allison & Busby edition, 1976 ===
- "The Peking Junction"
- "The Delhi Division"
- "The Tank Trapeze"
- "The Nature of the Catastrophe"
- "The Swastika Set-Up"
- "The Sunset Perspective"
- "Sea Wolves"
- "Voortrekker"
- "Dead Singers"
- "The Longford Cup"
- "The Entropy Circuit"

=== Four Walls Eight Windows edition, 2003 ===
- Introduction
- "The Peking Junction"
- "The Delhi Division"
- "The Tank Trapeze"
- "The Swastika Set-Up"
- "The Sunset Perspective"
- "Sea Wolves"
- "Voortrekker"
- "The Spencer Inheritance"
- "The Camus Connection"
- "Cheering for the Rockets"
- "Firing the Cathedral"

== Reception ==
Dave Langford reviewed The Lives and Times of Jerry Cornelius for White Dwarf #88, and stated that "oblique, fragmented stories of the hero/assassin who became a rallying point for the 1960s 'New Wave' themes of entropy and disintegration".
