= The Whispering Swarm =

2015 novel by Michael Moorcock

- First edition
- Author: Michael Moorcock
- Cover artist: Ross MacDonald
- Language: English
- Genre: Literary fiction
- Publisher: Tor
- Publication date: 2015
- Publication place: United Kingdom
- Media type: Print (Hardback)
- Pages: 480 pp
- ISBN: 978-0-7653-2477-1

The Whispering Swarm (2015) is a fantasy novel by Michael Moorcock, the first in his Sanctuary of the White Friars series. Friar Isidore is a monk who introduces Michael to Alsacia, the secret heart of London.
