= The Great Rock 'n' Roll Swindle (novel) =

First edition (publ. Virgin Books)

The Great Rock 'n' Roll Swindle is a novel by Michael Moorcock published in 1980.

== Plot summary ==
The Great Rock 'n' Roll Swindle is a novel in which Jerry Cornelius and the Sex Pistols cause anarchy in the U.K.

== Reception ==
Greg Costikyan reviewed The Great Rock n Roll Swindle in Ares Magazine #12 and commented that "There are some amusing moments in Swindle [...] especially when Bakunin and the Ukrainian anarchist Makhno criticize the hedonistic decadence of what punkers claim is 'anarchy.'"

== Reviews ==
- Review by Richard E. Geis (1980) in Science Fiction Review, August 1980
- Review by Joseph Nicholas (1981) in Paperback Inferno, Volume 4, Number 5
