= The Time Dweller =

1969 collection of short stories by Michael Moorcock

- First edition (1969)
- Author: Michael Moorcock
- Cover artist: David Stone
- Language: English
- Genre: Science fiction
- Publisher: Robert Hale
- Publication date: 1969
- Publication place: United Kingdom
- Media type: Print (paperback)
- Pages: 176 pp

The Time Dweller is a collection of short stories by Michael Moorcock. The stories contained in the collection were published between 1963 and 1966, and the collection itself was published in 1969.

The majority of the stories were originally published in New Worlds during the time in which Moorcock was the editor of that magazine, and by and large can be considered clear examples of New Wave science fiction.

The titular story and the following one, entitled "Escape From Evening", deal with a post apocalyptic world in which a group of characters are able to leave the physical plane and enter a realm of pure time. Many of the other stories deal with ambiguous, dream like journeys of one form another.

== Contents ==
The stories contained in the collection, as well as the year and source of their original publication, are as follows:

- "The Time Dweller" - 1964 - New Worlds
- "Escape From Evening" - 1965 - New Worlds
- "The Deep Fix" - 1963 - Science Fantasy
- "The Mountain" - 1965 - New Worlds
- "The Pleasure Garden of Felipe Sagittarius" - 1965 - New Worlds
- "Wolf" - 1966 - In THE DEEP FIX as by James Colvin (a collection from Compact Books)
- "The Golden Barge" - 1965 - New Worlds
- "The Ruins" - 1966 - New Worlds
