= Jerry Cornelius =

Fictional urban adventurer created by Michael Moorcock

Jerry Cornelius is a fictional character created by English author Michael Moorcock. The character is an urban adventurer and an incarnation of the author's Eternal Champion concept. Cornelius is a hipster of ambiguous and occasionally polymorphous sexuality. Many of the same characters feature in each of several Cornelius books, though the individual books have little connection with one another, having a more metafictional than causal relationship. The first Jerry Cornelius book, The Final Programme, was made into a 1973 film starring Jon Finch and Jenny Runacre. Notting Hill in London features prominently in the stories.

== Overview ==
The series draws plot elements from Moorcock's Elric series, as well as the Commedia dell'Arte. Moorcock hints in many places that Cornelius may be an aspect of the Eternal Champion. Characters from the Cornelius novels show up in much of Moorcock's other fiction: The Dancers at the End of Time series has a character called Jherek Carnelian who is the son of Lord Jagged of Canaria, and there are several hints in the series that Lord Jagged may be a guise of Jerry Cornelius; the Cornelius-series character Una Persson also appears in the "Dancers" series and the Oswald Bastable books, and may also be the character Oona in the later Elric books; Colonel Pyat has his own non-SF series of books by Moorcock, beginning with Byzantium Endures.

At least five other variants of the name occur in other Moorcock works (Jerry Cornell, Jehamiah Cohnalias, Jhary-a-Conel (Corum, Runestaff), Lord Jagged of Canaria from The Dancers at the End of Time, and the anagrammatic Corum Jhaelen Irsei). A space pirate named Captain Cornelius (who like Jerry is associated with the commedia dell'arte character Pierrot) appears in Moorcock's Doctor Who novel, The Coming of the Terraphiles.

=== The Cornelius Quartet ===
In these four novels Jerry undergoes transformations, dies, is reborn, spends one entire novel as a shivering wreck, and eventually discovers his true natures. Moorcock strenuously objects to his character being depicted as a 'secret agent'. There are almost no elements of the spy genre in the Cornelius stories.

- The Final Programme

Jerry battles his brother Frank who has kidnapped his beloved sister Catherine. Frank dies, but Catherine is also killed. Jerry is sucked into the plans of Miss Brunner to create the perfect being by merging the bodies of Jerry and herself together. When this is done, a radiantly charismatic hermaphroditic being emerges from the machinery. All who see the new creature fall quaking to their knees. The creature itself announces that this is "a very tasty world".

- A Cure for Cancer

Jerry is solo again, existing as negative character with black skin and white hair. He moves through a landscape of destroyed English cities and occupying American armies, a metaphor for contemporary Vietnam. He runs a clandestine "transmogrification" service for people who want to cast off their old selves, flesh and all. There is the gluttonous Bishop Beesley, and his daughter Mitzi. Eventually Jerry drives the Americans to madness, causing them to burn everything, including themselves.

- The English Assassin

All the supporting characters, particularly Una Persson, drive this novel while Jerry is nothing more than a whimpering heap of rags washed up on a beach and carried in the back of a lorry to safety. There are episodes in settings ranging from the cockpit of a Dornier Do X, the deck of an Edwardian sailing ship, the anarchic steppes of revolutionary Russia, and Victorian music-hall. Finally Jerry is able to revive as the character Pierrot, forever mourning his lost Columbine, who is Catherine.

- The Condition of Muzak

Taking its title from the Walter Pater quote "All art constantly aspires towards the condition of music", this is a series of vignettes that cast Jerry as a teenager in Notting Hill, a character in the commedia dell'arte, a secret agent and a fool. Particularly notable are the Notting Hill scenes, which seem to reduce all the other parts of the canon to fantasies in the adolescent Jerry's mind. Other scenes fill in detail, if any were needed, between the novels. In the final scene Jerry's foul-mouthed mother dies, and on her deathbed she reveals the family's history as a distorted version of the canon which Jerry and his now-pregnant sister Catherine seem doomed to continue.

== Main characters ==
- Jerry Cornelius, secret agent, superhero, adventurer, all things to all men (and women). A figure of almost complete anarchy. Typically destroys repressive authority. Later he is exposed as a false Harlequin, a tragic Pierrot at heart, or simply an adolescent fantasy.
- Miss Brunner, Jerry's opposite, representing stifling authority, also follows a more mystical path than Jerry's fatalistic realism.
- Bishop Beesley, endlessly corrupt gluttonous villain. He thirsts for power, money and pleasure.
- Una Persson, a female version of Jerry, even to the extent of being Catherine's lover. In The Condition of Muzak she is revealed to be a true Harlequin.
- Catherine Cornelius, Jerry's sister and incestuous lover. Usually dies tragically. She is often pregnant by Jerry. In some stories, she is a masochistic figure.
- Major Nye, a retired British Army officer, participant in secret missions, and Una Persson's sometime lover.
- Colonel Pyat, a Russian emigre officer, also a sometime lover of Una Persson.
- Cornelius Brunner, proclaimed Messiah of the Age of Science, a hermaphrodite amalgam of Jerry Cornelius and Miss Brunner in The Final Programme.
- Professor Hira, occasionally another of Jerry's lovers. Hira is counterpart to Jerry's character, always calm and in control.
- Frank Cornelius, Jerry's scheming brother, Cain to Jerry's Abel. Usually killed by Jerry, but always returns.
- Mrs. Cornelius is fat, libidinous, foul-mouthed mother to Frank, Jerry and Catherine. She is the quintessential urban survivor and a modern Mother Courage.
- 'Shaky' Mo Collier, a companion on many adventures, and also supplier of many and varied drugs to almost everyone. He almost acts as Jerry's right-hand man always there when needed, although somewhat unreliable in execution of tasks. The character was created by M. John Harrison, rather than Moorcock.

== Bibliography ==
=== Novels ===
- The Final Programme
- A Cure for Cancer
- The English Assassin
- The Condition of Muzak

=== Collections ===
- The Lives and Times of Jerry Cornelius
- The New Nature of the Catastrophe

=== Associated novels ===
- The Adventures of Una Persson and Catherine Cornelius in the Twentieth Century
- The Distant Suns
- Doctor Who: The Coming of the Terraphiles

=== Novellas ===
- The Entropy Tango
- The Great Rock 'n' Roll Swindle (a.k.a. Gold Diggers of '77). Ties the Sex Pistols in with the Cornelius mythos.
- The Alchemist's Question
- Firing the Cathedral

=== Short fiction ===
- "The Peking Junction"
- "The Delhi Division"
- "The Tank Trapeze"
- "The Nature of the Catastrophe"
- "The Swastika Set-up"
- "The Sunset Perspective"
- "Sea Wolves"
- "Voortrekker"
- "Dead Singers" (not to be confused with the non-Jerry Cornelius story of the same title)
- "The Longford Cup"
- "The Entropy Circuit"
- "The Entropy Tango"
- "The Murderer's Song"
- "The Gangrene Collection"
- "The Roumanian Question"
- "The Dodgem Decision" (vt "The Dodgem Division", "The Dodgem Arrangement")
- "All the Way Round Again" (vt "The Enigma Windows")
- "The Spencer Inheritance"
- "The Camus Connection"
- "Cheering for the Rockets"
- "Modem Times" (2008, published in The Solaris Book of New Science Fiction, vol. 2 AKA "Modem Times 2.0")
- "A Twist in the Lines" (2012, published in Nature)
- "The Icon Crackdown" (2013, published in Tales of the Shadowmen#''Tales of the Shadowmen'', Volume 10: Espirit de Corps)
- "Pegging the President" (published by PS Publishing, 2017)
- "The Last Hurrah of the Golden Horde" by Norman Spinrad (1969)

== In other media ==
=== Comics ===
- "The Adventures of Jerry Cornelius" (or "The English Assassin"), co-written with M. John Harrison and illustrated by Mal Dean.
- "Midnight Kiss" (Cornelius is a main character throughout the five part story), written by Tony Lee and illustrated by Ryan Stegman.
- "The Airtight Garage" (French: Le Garage Hermétique or, in its earliest serialized form, Le Garage Hermétique de Jerry Cornelius) by Moebius.
- Appearing in Black Dossier, Volume III: Century and Volume IV: The Tempest of "The League of Extraordinary Gentlemen", written by Alan Moore and illustrated by Kevin O'Neill.

=== Film adaptations ===
- The Final Programme was a 1973 movie adaptation of The Final Programme, directed by Robert Fuest.

=== Musical adaptations ===
In 2008, The Entropy Tango & Gloriana Demo Sessions by Michael Moorcock & The Deep Fix was released. These were sessions for planned albums based on two Moorcock novels: Glorianna and The Entropy Tango. Two of the Jerry Cornelius/Entropy Tango tracks were reworked with additional musicians and appeared on the Spirits Burning CD Alien Injection, also released in 2008.

- "The Entropy Tango" by Spirits Burning (Alien Injection, 2008)
- "Every Gun Plays Its Own Tune" by Spirits Burning (Alien Injection, 2008)
- "Needle Gun" by Hawkwind (The Chronicle Of The Black Sword, 1985) (named after the needlegun, Cornelius's weapon of choice)
- "Veteran of the Psychic Wars" by Blue Öyster Cult (Heavy Metal: Music From The Motion Picture, 1981)
- "Kings of Speed" by Hawkwind (Warrior on the Edge of Time, 1975)

== Work inspired by Jerry Cornelius ==
Moorcock encouraged other authors and artists to create works about Jerry Cornelius, in an early open source shared world attempt at open brand sharing. One example is Norman Spinrad's The Last Hurrah of the Golden Horde. Another is Mœbius's The Airtight Garage. The Nature of the Catastrophe, a collection of Jerry Cornelius stories and comic strips which had appeared in New Worlds (with art by Mal Dean) by various hands, was published in 1971. It includes works by Moorcock himself, James Sallis, Brian Aldiss, Langdon Jones, M. John Harrison, Richard Glyn Jones, Alex Krislov, and Maxim Jakubowski.

The story "...the price is worth it" by Graeme K. Talboys and the subsequent novels in the Stormlight quartet (along with the short story collection Stormwrack) are centred on Charlie Cornelius, a daughter of the Cornelius clan with uncertain parentage.

In comics, various writers have used elements of the character, including Bryan Talbot's character Luther Arkwright. Matt Fraction's Casanova series also pays homage to Cornelius. Tony Lee's Midnight Kiss features Cornelius with Michael Moorcock's blessing. (Moorcock wrote the introduction for the collected trade paperback). Grant Morrison created an Oscar Wilde-inspired steampunk version of Jerry Cornelius in Sebastian O, the original Vertigo mini-series. Another Morrison character, Gideon Stargrave of The Invisibles, is one of the few interpretations of the character that Moorcock has issues with, as he considers the character little more than a straight lift of Cornelius.

The name of the protagonist of Mœbius's The Airtight Garage was changed in later editions to "Lewis Carnelian". In 2006, on his website, Moorcock wrote:

I didn't retroactively withdraw permission. Moebius was a friend of friends of mine when he started and someone (I don't know who) told him I didn't like the strip. I loved the strip, though I'd said it wasn't really Jerry Cornelius. This got taken to mean by someone that I didn't like it and Moebius, whom I came to know later and explain that I hadn't withdrawn permission, took the JC out of the title. He knows now that I liked it and had no problems with it.

Bad Voltage, a 1980s cyberpunk novel by Jonathan Littell that also dealt with themes of bisexuality and violence, features guest appearances by a has-been Jerry Cornelius and a substance-abusing 'Shaky' Mo Collier. The independent comic Man-Elf featured not only Cornelius but members of his supporting cast in an homage. Cornelius is also seen in Alan Moore's The League of Extraordinary Gentlemen: Black Dossier as a child. Cornelius appears in the second part of Alan Moore's three-part comic The League of Extraordinary Gentlemen, Volume III: Century. The character also appears in Neurotwistin', a French novel by Laurent Queyssi (an appearance sanctioned by Moorcock). The 1996 White Wolf anthology Pawn of CHAOS features new Cornelius stories by John Shirley, Caitlín R. Kiernan, and Nancy Collins. A version of Jerry Cornelius also appears in Michael Moorcock's 1999 graphic novel Multiverse. An ongoing presentation of new Cornelius stories is on Moorcock's Jeremiah Cornelius Facebook page.

Carter Kaplan plays a variation on Jerry Cornelius in his novel Tally-Ho, Cornelius!.

Author Bruce Sterling has described his recurring character Leggy Starlitz, star of a series of short stories and the novel Zeitgeist, as "a nonlinear descendant of Moorcock's Jerry Cornelius".

== See also ==
- Sex in science fiction
