= The Coming of the Terraphiles =

2010 novel by Michael Moorcock

The Coming of the Terraphiles or The Pirates of the Second Aether
- Dust-jacket from the first edition, designed by Lee Binding.
- Author: Michael Moorcock
- Language: English
- Genre: Science fiction
- Publisher: BBC Books
- Publication date: 14 October 2010
- Publication place: United Kingdom
- Media type: Paperback, hardback and audiobook (unabridged text read by Clive Mantle)
- Pages: 343
- ISBN: 978-1-84607-983-2 (Hardback First Edition)
- Preceded by: The Glamour Chase
- Followed by: Dead of Winter

The Coming of the Terraphiles is a Doctor Who novel written by Michael Moorcock, featuring the Eleventh Doctor and Amy Pond. It was the first special release of a Doctor Who novel by BBC Books in a lengthier hardback format to that of the previous New Series Adventures.

== Plot ==
In order to avert the impending collapse of the Multiverse from the mysterious "dark tides" that have begun to appear, the Doctor and Amy join the Terraphiles, a group of humans in the far future obsessed with recreating Earth's distant past and re-enacting medieval Earth sports (or rather, unknowingly comic misinterpretations of the same). The Doctor and his new friends compete in a Grand Tournament in the Miggea star system, which lies on the border of parallel realities. The prize of the contest is an ancient artifact called the Arrow of Law, sought also by the Doctor's old foe Captain Cornelius and his crew of space pirates.

== Writing ==
Moorcock stated that he wrote the book because he felt he would enjoy writing an original adventure; he likes the main character because he is unrationalised and ambiguous. He was however concerned about what the hardcore fans would make of his work.

== Reviews ==
Reviews were mostly positive, calling the book "a demented P.G. Wodehouse pastiche... It’s been years since the Who range put out anything as smart and engaging as this". Several reviews comment that it is both a Moorcock and Doctor Who book, capturing the Englishness of Doctor Who and the Moorcock theme of Order and Chaos and the appearance of Moorcock's recurring character Jerry Cornelius. Influences from Wodehouse, Sexton Blake and Douglas Adams are noted. Although the characterisation of the Eleventh Doctor was praised as "pretty convincing", it was criticised by others as being generic and "Tom Baker in tone". Amy Pond is described as being both "well-realised and distinctive" as well as "pretty unrecognisable" and "inauthentic".
