= The Adventures of Una Persson and Catherine Cornelius in the 20th Century =

1976 novel by Michael Moorcock

- Dust-jacket from the first edition.
- Author: Michael Moorcock
- Language: English
- Series: Jerry Cornelius
- Genre: Literary fiction
- Publisher: Quartet Books
- Publication date: 1976
- Publication place: United Kingdom
- Media type: Print (hardback)
- Pages: 216 pp
- ISBN: 0-7043-2121-1
- OCLC: 2947938
- Dewey Decimal: 823/.9/14
- LC Class: PZ4.M8185 Ad PR6063.O59

The Adventures of Una Persson and Catherine Cornelius in the 20th Century: A Romance is a novel by British fantasy and science fiction writer Michael Moorcock. It is part of his long running Jerry Cornelius series. It was first published in 1976 by Quartet Books in the UK.

== Plot synopsis ==
Catherine Cornelius and Una Persson (usually supporting characters in the Jerry Cornelius novels) grow bored of their current tranquil existence together as lovers and separate in search of adventure. Their stories are told in parallel from this point until the end, where they rejoin and the story begins again.

Catherine, generally portrayed in a saintly and/or martyred role moves through a series of relationships in which she is abused or dominated by her partner. She attempts at one point to get Jerry Cornelius (her brother and sometimes her lover) to beat her, but he is unable to satisfy her. Una Persson, who ordinarily fills Jerry's role as the eternal revolutionary when he is unwilling or unable to, embroils herself in a series of revolutionary wars - always on the losing side.

At the end, Una begins to despair of the situation in which she has found herself, and is rescued by Catherine who takes her back to the cottage they shared at the start of the novel to recuperate. This is an inversion of their roles throughout the book, as up until that point Una has been an active combatant and Catherine has been increasingly dominated.
