= Michael Moorcock =

English writer, editor, critic (born 1939)

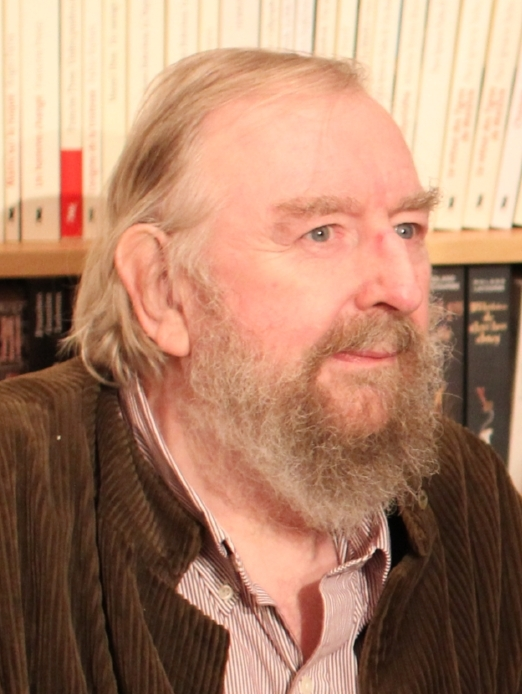
- Moorcock in 2012
- Born: Michael John Moorcock; 18 December 1939 (age 86); London, England
- Occupations: Novelist, journalist, script writer, musician, editor, critic
- Writing career
- Pen name: Bill Barclay; William Ewert Barclay; Michael Barrington (with Barrington J. Bayley); Edward P. Bradbury; James Colvin; Warwick Colvin Jr.; Desmond Reid (shared)
- Period: 1957–present
- Genres: Science fiction, fantasy, weird fiction, Literary
- Subject: Science fiction (as editor)
- Notable works: The Elric Saga (novels), Mother London. The Pyat Quartet
- Movement: New Wave science fiction
- Website: www.michaelmoorcock.net

Michael John Moorcock (born 18 December 1939) is an English writer, editor and critic originally of science fiction and fantasy, who has published many well-received literary novels as well as comic thrillers, graphic novels and non-fiction. He has worked as an editor and is also a successful musician. He is best known for his novels about the character Elric of Melniboné, which were a seminal influence on the field of fantasy in the 1960s and 1970s.

As editor of the British avant garde/science fiction magazine New Worlds, from May 1964 until March 1971 and then again from 1976 to 1996, Moorcock fostered the development of the science fiction "New Wave" in the UK and indirectly in the United States, publishing and publicising the work of J.G. Ballard, Thomas M. Disch, John Sladek, Langdon Jones, Barrington J. Bayley, Hilary Bailey, Pamela Zoline, Samuel R. Delany and M. John Harrison leading to the advent of cyberpunk. His publication of Bug Jack Barron (1969) by Norman Spinrad as a serial novel was notorious; in Parliament, some British MPs condemned the Arts Council of Great Britain for funding the magazine. In 2008, The Times named Moorcock in its list of "The 50 greatest British writers since 1945".

Moorcock is also a recording musician; he has contributed to the music acts Hawkwind, Blue Öyster Cult, Robert Calvert and Spirits Burning, and to his own project, Michael Moorcock & The Deep Fix.

== Biography ==
Michael Moorcock was born in Mitcham, Surrey (now Greater London), in December 1939, and experienced the intensive bombing of war-time London as well as its ruined landscapes, while he wrote particularly about the area of Notting Hill Gate and Ladbroke Grove, an important influence in some of his fiction (such as the Cornelius novels).

Moorcock has mentioned The Master Mind of Mars by Edgar Rice Burroughs, The Apple Cart by George Bernard Shaw and The Constable of St. Nicholas by Edwin Lester Arnold as the first three non-juvenile books that he read before beginning primary school. The first book he bought was a secondhand copy of The Pilgrim's Progress.

Moorcock is the former husband of the writer Hilary Bailey, with whom he had three children: Sophie (b. 1963), Katherine (b. 1964), and Max (b. 1972). Moorcock is also the former husband of Jill Riches, who later married Robert Calvert. She illustrated some of Moorcock's books, including covers, among them the dustjacket for the first edition of Gloriana (Allison and Busby, 1978). In 1983, Linda Steele became Moorcock's third wife.

Without his knowledge he was made an early member of the Swordsmen and Sorcerers' Guild of America (SAGA), a loose-knit group of eight heroic fantasy authors founded in the 1960s and led by Lin Carter, selected by fantasy credentials alone.

Moorcock is the subject of four book-length works, a monograph and an interview, by Colin Greenland. In 1983, Greenland published The Entropy Exhibition: Michael Moorcock and the British 'New Wave' in Science Fiction. He followed this with Michael Moorcock: Death is No Obstacle, a book-length series of interviews with Moorcock about the techniques in his writing, in 1992. Michael Moorcock: Law of Chaos by Jeff Gardiner and Michael Moorcock: Fiction, Fantasy and the World's Pain by Mark Scroggins were published more recently.

In the 1990s, Moorcock moved to Texas in the United States. His wife Linda is American. He spends half of the year in Texas, and works the other half in Europe.

== Political views ==
Moorcock's works feature political content. In one interview, he states, "I am an anarchist and a pragmatist. My moral / philosophical position is that of an anarchist." In describing how his writing relates to his political philosophy, Moorcock says, "My books frequently deal with aristocratic heroes, gods and so forth. All of them end on a note which often states quite directly that one should serve neither gods nor masters but become one's own master." Besides using fiction to explore his politics, Moorcock also engages in non-violent political activism. In order to "marginalize stuff that works to objectify women and suggests women enjoy being beaten", he has encouraged W H Smiths to move John Norman's Gor series novels to the top shelf. For many years he has written for magazines and newspapers of all political stripes, including The Times, New Statesman, The Spectator, The Guardian, The Daily Telegraph, The Washington Post, LA Times and many others on all manner of subjects.

== Writer ==
=== Fiction ===
Moorcock began writing while he was still at school, contributing to a magazine he entitled Outlaw's Own from 1950 on.

In 1957, at the age of 17, Moorcock became editor of Tarzan Adventures (a national juvenile weekly featuring text and Tarzan comic strip), which had published at least a dozen of his own "Sojan the Swordsman" stories during that year and the next. At the age of 18, in 1958, he wrote the allegorical fantasy novel The Golden Barge. This remained unpublished until 1980, when it was issued by Savoy Books with an introduction by M. John Harrison. At 19, Moorcock worked on The Sexton Blake Library, a serial pulp fiction featuring Sexton Blake, which The Encyclopedia of Science Fiction referred to as the poor man's Sherlock Holmes.

Under Moorcock's leadership, New Worlds became central to "New Wave" science fiction. This movement, not of its own naming, promoted individual vision, literary style and an existential view of technological change, in contrast to generic "hard science fiction", which extrapolated on technological change itself. Some "New Wave" stories were not recognisable as traditional science fiction, and New Worlds remained controversial for as long as Moorcock edited it. Moorcock claimed that he wanted to publish experimental/literary fiction using techniques and subject matter from generic SF but, initially at least, to marry "popular" and "literary" fiction at what he considered their natural overlap. After 1967, this policy became evident and allied to the British "pop art" movement exemplified by Eduardo Paolozzi, Richard Hamilton and others. Paolozzi became "Aviation Editor".

During that time, he occasionally wrote as "James Colvin", a "house pseudonym" originally created for him by John Carnell also used by other New Worlds critics. A spoof obituary of Colvin appeared in New Worlds #197 (January 1970), written by Charles Platt as "William Barclay". Moorcock makes much use of the initials "JC"; these are also the initials of Jesus Christ, the subject of his 1967 Nebula Award-winning novella Behold the Man, which tells the story of Karl Glogauer, a time-traveller who takes on the role of Christ. They are also the initials of various "Eternal Champion" Moorcock characters such as Jerry Cornelius, Jerry Cornell and Jherek Carnelian. In more recent years, Moorcock has taken to using "Warwick Colvin, Jr." as a pseudonym, particularly in his "Second Ether" fiction.

Moorcock has also published pastiches of writers for whom he felt affection as a boy, including Edgar Rice Burroughs, Leigh Brackett, and Robert E. Howard. All his fantasy adventures have elements of satire and parody, while respecting what he considers the essentials of the form. Although his heroic fantasies have been his most consistently reprinted books in the United States, he achieved prominence in the UK as a literary author, with the Guardian Fiction Prize in 1977 for The Condition of Muzak, and with Mother London later shortlisted in the final three with Rushdie and Chatwynd for the Whitbread Prize.

Novels and series such as the Cornelius Quartet, Mother London, King of the City, the Pyat Quartet and the short story collection London Bone have established him in the eyes of critics such as Iain Sinclair, Peter Ackroyd and Allan Massie in publications including The Times Literary Supplement and the London Review of Books as a major contemporary literary novelist. In 2008 Moorcock was named by a critics' panel in The Times as one of the fifty best British novelists since 1945. Virtually all of his stories are part of his overarching "Eternal Champion" theme or oeuvre, with characters (including Elric) moving from one storyline and fictional universe to another, all of them interconnected (though often only in dreams or visions).

Most of Moorcock's earlier work consisted of short stories and relatively brief novels: he has mentioned that "I could write 15,000 words a day and gave myself three days a volume. That's how, for instance, the Hawkmoon books were written." Over the period of the New Worlds editorship and his publishing of the original fantasy novels Moorcock has maintained an interest in the craft of writing and a continuing interest in the semi-journalistic craft of "pulp" authorship. This is reflected in his development of interlocking cycles which hark back to the origins of fantasy in myth and medieval cycles (see "Wizardry and Wild Romance – Moorcock" and "Death Is No Obstacle – Colin Greenland" for more commentary). This also provides an implicit link with the episodic origins of literature in newspaper/magazine serials from Trollope and Dickens onwards.

Since the 1980s, Moorcock has written longer, more literary "mainstream" novels, such as Mother London and Byzantium Endures, but he continued to revisit characters from his earlier works, such as Elric. With the publication of the third and last book in his Elric Moonbeam Roads sequence, he announced that he was "retiring" from writing heroic fantasy fiction, though he continued to write Elric's adventures as graphic novels with his long-time collaborators Walter Simonson and the late James Cawthorn (1929–2008) (Note: Xanadu Publications of London commissioned Moorcock to write Fantasy: The 100 Best Books. When it became "clear that I would not be able to deliver it for a long time, the publishers and I agreed that James Cawthorn was the person to take it over." Cawthorn was the primary author of the selections "mainly", according to Cawthorn, and of the text "by far", according to Moorcock. See Cawthorn and Moorcock, Fantasy, "Introduction", page 9. The introduction, pp. 8–10, comprises a long section signed by Cawthorn, a short one signed by Moorcock, and joint unsigned "Notes and Acknowledgments". Fantasy became the third or fourth volume in Xanadu's 100 Best series. ISFDB gives release date November 1988 for both Fantasy and Horror.) and in 2021 announced that he had written a "straight" Elric novel, within the first canon, for the 60th anniversary of his hero's appearance. Moorcock and Simonson produced the graphic novel, Elric: the Making of a Sorcerer, published by DC Comics in 2007. In 2006, Moorcock completed his highly praised Colonel Pyat sequence, dealing with the Nazi Holocaust. This began in 1981 with Byzantium Endures, continued through The Laughter of Carthage (1984) and Jerusalem Commands (1992), and culminated with The Vengeance of Rome (2006). His most recent sequence, KABOUL, with illustrations by Miles Hyman, was published in French by Denoel. He has long been a keen Francophile, publishing several works in France before they were published in English.

Among other works by Moorcock are The Dancers at the End of Time, comedies set on Earth millions of years in the future; Gloriana, or The Unfulfill'd Queen, which he describes as an argument with Spenser's The Faerie Queen, set in an alternative Earth history; and the "Second Ether" sequence beginning with Blood, mixing absurdism, reminiscence and family memoir against the background of his multiverse.

Moorcock is prone to revising his existing work, with the result that different editions of a given book may contain significant variations. The changes range from simple retitlings (the Elric story The Flame Bringers became The Caravan of Forgotten Dreams in the 1990s Victor Gollancz/White Wolf omnibus editions) to character name changes (such as detective "Minos Aquilinas" becoming first "Minos von Bek" and later "Sam Begg" in three different versions of the short story "The Pleasure Garden of Felipe Sagittarius"), major textual alterations (for example, the addition of several new chapters to The Steel Tsar in the omnibus editions), and even complete restructurings (as with the 1966 novella Behold the Man being expanded to novel-length and into a novel rather than an SF story recreated from the original version that appeared in New Worlds for republication as a book in 1969 by Allison and Busby).

A new, final revision of almost Moorcock's entire oeuvre, with the exception of his literary novels Mother London, King of the City and the Pyat quartet, is issued by Gollancz and many of his titles are reprinted in the United States by Simon and Schuster and Titan and in France by Gallimard. Many novels and comics based on his work are being reprinted by Titan Books under the general title The Michael Moorcock Library, while in France a new adaptation of the Elric and Hawkmoon series has been translated into many languages, including English. These have been translated world-wide. He also works in France with his partner Jean-Luc Fromental and published a collaborative Elric novel with Fabrice Colin. In 2025, Mutter London was published in Germany by Carcosa Verlag.

=== Elric of Melniboné and the Eternal Champion ===
Moorcock's best-selling works have been the "Elric of Melniboné" stories. In these, Elric is a deliberate reversal of perceived clichés found in fantasy adventure novels inspired by the works of J. R. R. Tolkien.

Central to many of his seminal fantasy novels, including his Elric books, is the concept of an "Eternal Champion", who has multiple identities across alternate universes. This cosmology is called the "Multiverse" within his novels. The Multiverse deals with fundamental polarities, such as Law versus Chaos, and order versus entropy.

Elric's success has overshadowed Moorcock's other works, though he has worked the Elric stories' themes into his other works (the "Hawkmoon" and "Corum" novels, for example). His Eternal Champion sequence has been collected in two different editions of omnibus volumes totaling 16 books (the U.S. edition was 15 volumes, while the British edition was 14 volumes, but due to various rights issues, the U.S. edition contained two volumes that were not included in the British edition, and the British edition likewise contained one volume that was not included in the U.S. edition) containing several books per volume, by Victor Gollancz in the UK and by White Wolf Publishing in the US. Several attempts to make an Elric film were made. Moorcock refused to resign the options, usually when they seemed to drift too far off course. In February 2019, BBC Studios announced they had secured the rights to the Runestaff series of fantasy novels, which feature Hawkmoon as their hero.

==== Jerry Cornelius ====
Another of Moorcock's creations is Jerry Cornelius, a hip urban adventurer of ambiguous gender; the same characters featured in each of several Cornelius books. These books were satirical of modern times, including current fashion, various 'unjust' wars (including Vietnam, Iran and Iraq), and neoligisms etc, and continued to feature another variation of the multiverse theme. The first Jerry Cornelius book, The Final Programme (1968), was made into a feature film in 1973. Its story line is identical to two of the Elric stories: The Dreaming City and The Dead Gods' Book. Since 1998, Moorcock has returned to Cornelius in a series of new stories: The Spencer Inheritance, The Camus Connection, Cheering for the Rockets, and Firing the Cathedral, which was concerned with 9/11. All four novellas were included in the 2003 edition of The Lives and Times of Jerry Cornelius. Moorcock's recent Cornelius story, "Modem Times", appeared in The Solaris Book of New Science Fiction: Volume 2, published in 2008, this was expanded in 2011 as "Modem Times 2.0" (PM Press). Additionally, a version of Cornelius also appeared in Moorcock's 2010 Doctor Who novel The Coming of the Terraphiles. Pegging the President (PS. 2018), The Fracking Factory (PS, 2018) are two recent novellas, Wigan! (NEW WORLDS, 2024) appeared in the magazine's 60th-anniversary issue and further stories are forthcoming. Since 1963 Moorcock has been obsessed with creating what he calls a new mythology for the current age, creating a kind of Commedia dell' Arte troupe of characters which can appear in many guises and forms to deal with a wide range of subject matter.

=== Views on fiction writing ===
Moorcock is a fervent admirer of Mervyn Peake's works.

Moorcock is critical of J. R. R. Tolkien's works. He met both Tolkien and C. S. Lewis in his teens and claims to have liked them personally even though he does not admire them on artistic grounds. Moorcock criticised works such as The Lord of the Rings for their "Merry England" comfort-fantasy point of view, equating Tolkien's novel to the reassuring tone of the BBC's Children's Hour, designed to calm children down for bed-time and Winnie-the-Pooh in his essay "Epic Pooh". Even so, James Cawthorn and Moorcock included The Lord of the Rings in Fantasy: The 100 Best Books (Carroll & Graf, 1988), and their review is not dismissive.

Moorcock has also criticized writers for their political agendas. He included Robert A. Heinlein and H. P. Lovecraft among this group in a 1978 essay, "Starship Stormtroopers" (Anarchist Review). There, Moorock criticised the production of "authoritarian" fiction by certain canonical writers and Lovecraft for having antisemitic, misogynistic, and racist viewpoints woven into his short stories.

=== Sharing fictional universes with others ===
Moorcock has allowed other writers to create stories in his fictional Jerry Cornelius universe. Brian Aldiss, Hilary Bailey, M. John Harrison, Norman Spinrad, James Sallis, and Steve Aylett have written such stories. In an interview published in The Internet Review of Science Fiction, Moorcock explains the reason for sharing his character:

I came out of popular fiction and Jerry was always meant to be a sort of crystal ball for others to see their own visions in – the stories were designed to work like that – a diving board, to use another analogy, from which to jump into the river and be carried along by it. [...] All of these have tended to use Jerry the way I intended to use him – as a way of seeing modern life and sometimes as a way of commenting on it. Jerry, as Harrison said, was as much a technique as a character and I'm glad that others have taken to using that method.

Two short stories by Keith Roberts, "Coranda" and "The Wreck of the Kissing Bitch", are set in the frozen Matto Grosso plateau of Moorcock's 1969 novel, The Ice Schooner.

Elric of Melnibone and Moonglum appear in Karl Edward Wagner's story "The Gothic Touch", where they meet with Kane, who borrows Elric for his ability to deal with demons.

He is a friend and fan of comic book writer Alan Moore and allowed Moore the use of his own character, Michael Kane of Old Mars, mentioned in Moore's The League of Extraordinary Gentlemen, Volume II. The two appeared on stage at the Vanbrugh Theatre in London in January 2006 where they discussed Moorcock's work. The Green City from Warriors of Mars was also referenced in Larry Niven's Rainbow Mars. Jerry Cornelius appeared in Moore's The League of Extraordinary Gentlemen, Volume III: Century.

Cornelius also appeared in French artist Mœbius' comic series Le Garage Hermétique.

In 1995–96, Moorcock wrote a script for a computer game/film/novel by Origin Systems. When Electronic Arts bought Origins, the game was cancelled, but Moorcock's 40,000-word treatment was fleshed out by Storm Constantine, resulting in the novel Silverheart. The story is set in Karadur-Shriltasi, a city at the heart of the Multiverse. A second novel, Dragonskin, was in preparation, with Constantine as the main writer, but she died in January 2021, after a long illness. Moorcock abandoned a memoir about his friends Mervyn Peake and Maeve Gilmore because he felt it was too personal.

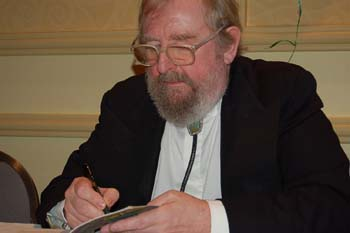
Moorcock in 2006

He wrote prose and verse for The Sunday Books first publication in French to accompany a set of unpublished Peake drawings. His book The Metatemporal Detective was published in 2007. His most recent book published first in French is Kaboul, in 2018.

In November 2009, Moorcock announced that he would be writing a Doctor Who novel for BBC Books in 2010, one of the few occasions when he has written stories set in other people's "shared universes". The novel The Coming of the Terraphiles was released in October 2010. The story merges Doctor Who with many of Moorcock's characters from the multiverse, notably Captain Cornelius and his pirates. In 2016, Moorcock published the first novel in what he terms a literary experiment blending memoir and fantasy, The Whispering Swarm. In 2018, he announced his completion of the second volume The Woods of Arcady. In 2020, he said he was completing the final Elric novel The Citadel of Forgotten Myths ready for Elric's 60th anniversary in 2021. Moorcock's Jerry Cornelius novella Pegging the President was launched in 2018 at Shakespeare and Co, Paris, where he discussed his work with Hari Kunzru and reaffirmed his commitment to literary experiment. With author Mark Hodder he has written two Sexton Blake stories and three Metatemporal Detective novels featuring a good many of his characters including Anthony Skene's Zenith the Abino who was an influence on Elric.

=== Audiobooks ===
The first of an audiobook series of unabridged Elric novels, with new work read by Moorcock, began appearing from AudioRealms; however, Audio Realms is no longer in business. The second audiobook in the series – The Sailor on the Seas of Fate – was published in 2007. There have been audio-books of Corum and others, several of which were unofficial and A Winter Admiral and Furniture are audio versions of short stories. Since then The Whispering Swarm and the Corum books became available via Audible and all the Elric books were scheduled to appear in audio form to coincide with Simon and Schuster's new illustrated set in 2022.

== Music ==
=== Michael Moorcock & The Deep Fix ===
Moorcock has his own music project, which records under the name Michael Moorcock & The Deep Fix. The Deep Fix was the title story of an obscure collection of short stories by James Colvin (a pen name of Moorcock) and was the name of the Jerry Cornelius band. Moorcock's story had dealt with releasing the unconscious, and although it referenced William Burroughs, it was not specifically about illicit drugs. This allegedly lost the band considerable airplay and gave Moorcock what he called 'a great reputation in the drug community' but made venues and stations wary of booking and playing them. The first album New Worlds Fair was released in 1975. The album included Snowy White, Peter Pavli of The Third Ear Band, regulars Steve Gilmore and Graham Charnock, Moorcock himself on guitars, mandolin and banjo, and a number of Hawkwind regulars in the credits. A second version of the New Worlds album was issued in 2004 under the album name Roller Coaster Holiday. A non-album rock single, including Lemmy on bass and Moorcock playing his own Rickenbacker 330/12, "Starcruiser" coupled with "Dodgem Dude", was belatedly issued in 1980 on Flicknife.

Although announced to appear at Dingwalls, the performance was cancelled when schedules clashed. The Deep Fix gave a rare live performance at the Roundhouse, London on 18 June 1978 at Nik Turner's Bohemian Love-In, headlined by Turner's band Sphynx and also featuring Tanz Der Youth with Brian James (ex-The Damned), Lightning Raiders, Steve Took's Horns, Roger Ruskin and others.

In 1982, as a trio with Peter Pavli and Drachen Theaker, some Deep Fix recordings were issued on Hawkwind, Friends and Relations and a limited-edition 7" single of "Brothel in Rosenstrasse" backed with "Time Centre", which featured Langdon Jones on piano. In 2008, The Entropy Tango & Gloriana Demo Sessions by Michael Moorcock & The Deep Fix was released. These were sessions for planned albums based on two of Moorcock's novels, Gloriana, or The Unfulfill'd Queen and The Entropy Tango, which were never completed. Pavli, Moorcock and Falcone are currently in the process of making the intended versions of those songs based on the group's TEAC recordings of the 80s. They are influenced heavily by modern classical music which they look to for inspiration. Moorcock's considerable range is demanded. Moorcock and Pavli have long been advocates for Mahler, Schoenberg, Ives and other 20th century composers.

Working with Martin Stone, Moorcock began recording a new Deep Fix album in Paris, titled Live at the Terminal Cafe. Following Stone's death in 2016, Moorcock completed the album with producer Don Falcone. In 2019, Moorcock announced the completion of the album, and it was released 11 October 2019, on Cleopatra Records. He has also recorded new covers of friends' work, Motörhead, The Greenfly and the Rose and his own Star Cruiser. Cleopatra recently commissioned a new albm with Alan Davey currently in its early stages.

=== With Hawkwind ===
Moorcock collaborated with the British rock band Hawkwind on many occasions: the Hawkwind track "The Black Corridor", for example, included verbatim quotes from Moorcock's novel of the same name, and he worked with the band on their album Warrior on the Edge of Time, for which he earned a gold disc. Moorcock also wrote the lyrics to "Sonic Attack", a satire of the public information broadcast, that was part of Hawkwind's Space Ritual set. Hawkwind's album The Chronicle of the Black Sword was largely based on the Elric novels. Moorcock appeared on stage with the band on many occasions, including the Black Sword tour. His contributions were removed from the original release of the Live Chronicles album, recorded on this tour, for legal reasons, but have subsequently appeared on some double-CD versions. He can also be seen performing on the DVD version of Chronicle of the Black Sword.

=== With Robert Calvert ===
Moorcock also collaborated with former Hawkwind frontman and resident poet, Robert Calvert (who gave the chilling declamation of "Sonic Attack"), on Calvert's albums Lucky Leif and the Longships and Hype, playing guitar and banjo and singing background vocals with his wife Linda.

=== With Blue Öyster Cult ===
Moorcock wrote the lyrics to three album tracks by the American band Blue Öyster Cult: "Black Blade", referring to the sword Stormbringer in the Elric books, "Veteran of the Psychic Wars", showing us Elric's emotions at a critical point of his story (this song may also refer to the "Warriors at the Edge of Time", which figure heavily in Moorcock's novels about John Daker; at one point his novel The Dragon in the Sword they call themselves the "veterans of a thousand psychic wars", although the term is also applied to Elric in 2022's "The Citadel of Forgotten Myths"), and "The Great Sun Jester", about his friend, the poet Bill Butler, who died of a drug overdose.

=== With Spirits Burning ===
Moorcock contributed vocals and harmonica to the Spirits Burning albums An Alien Heat, The Hollow Lands, The End Of All Songs - Part 1, and The End Of All Songs - Part 2. Most of the lyrics were taken from or based on text in novels from Moorcock's The Dancers at the End of Time trilogy. The albums were produced by Spirits Burning leader Don Falcone, and included contributions from Albert Bouchard and other members of Blue Öyster Cult, as well as former members of Hawkwind.

Moorcock plays harmonica on three songs on the 2021 Spirits Burning album Evolution Ritual.

Moorcock also appeared on five tracks on the Spirits Burning CD Alien Injection, released in 2008. He is credited with singing lead vocals and playing glockenspiel, guitar and mandolin. The performances used on the CD were from The Entropy Tango & Gloriana Demo Sessions.

=== Other appearances ===
- Narrated and wrote lyrics for the A side (title track) of the Thor For The Hammer single, released in 2026.
- Sang Starcruiser on the 2026 Hawkestrel Cover Ya Tracks album. This was a cover of a Michael Moorcock & The Deep Fix song.
- Did vocals for two songs on the 2026 Pink Fairies Covered In Pink album. Motorhead and Dum Dum Bala Bala Bow Row...Yeah!
- Wrote and narrated the introduction to the Smoulder track "Victims of Fate," which is featured on their 2023 album Violent Creed of Vengeance.

Moorcock's last public appearance as a music performer was with Nik Turner and Flame Tree in Austin, Texas, March 2019.

== Awards and honours ==
Michael Moorcock has received great recognition for his career contributions as well as for particular works.

The Science Fiction and Fantasy Hall of Fame inducted Moorcock in 2002. He also received life achievement awards at the World Fantasy Convention in 2000 (World Fantasy Award), at the Utopiales International Festival in 2004 (Prix Utopia), from the Horror Writers Association in 2005 (Bram Stoker Award), and from the Science Fiction and Fantasy Writers of America in 2008 (named its 25th Grand Master). He is a Parisian member of the London College of Pataphysicians.

- 1993: British Fantasy Society Special Committee Award for contribution to the genre
- 2000: World Fantasy Award for Life Achievement
- 2004: Prix Utopiales "Grandmaster" Lifetime Achievement Award
- 2004: Bram Stoker Award for Lifetime Achievement in the horror genre
- 2008: Damon Knight Memorial Grand Master Award, literary fantasy and science fiction

He was "Co-Guest of Honor" at the 1976 World Fantasy Convention in New York City and one Guest of Honor at the 1997 55th World Science Fiction Convention in San Antonio, Texas.

Awards for particular works

- 1967: Nebula Award (Novella): Behold the Man
- 1972: August Derleth Fantasy Award: The Knight of the Swords
- 1973: August Derleth Fantasy Award: The King of the Swords
- 1974: British Fantasy Award (Best Short Story): The Jade Man's Eyes
- 1975: August Derleth Fantasy Award: The Sword and the Stallion
- 1976: August Derleth Fantasy Award: The Hollow Lands
- 1977: Guardian Fiction Award: The Condition of Muzak
- 1979: John W. Campbell Memorial Award for Best Science Fiction Novel: Gloriana
- 1979: World Fantasy Award (Best Novel): Gloriana

== Selected works ==
- The Best of Michael Moorcock (Tachyon Publications, 2009)
- The Elric of Melniboné series (1961–2023), including:
  - The Dreaming City (1961)
  - The Stealer of Souls (1963)
  - Stormbringer (1965, revised 1977)
  - Elric of Melniboné (1972)
  - Elric: The Sailor on the Seas of Fate (1976)
  - The Weird of the White Wolf (1977)
  - The Vanishing Tower (1977)
  - The Bane of the Black Sword (1967,1970,1977)
  - Elric at the End of Time (1981)
  - The Fortress of the Pearl (1989)
  - The Revenge of the Rose (1991)
  - The Citadel of Forgotten Myths (2022)
  - The Folk of the Forest (novelette) (2023)
- The Dorian Hawkmoon series (1967–1975), including:
  - The Jewel in the Skull (1967)
  - The Mad God's Amulet (1968)
  - The Sword of the Dawn (1968)
  - The Runestaff (1969)
  - Count Brass (1973)
  - The Champion of Garathorm (1973)
  - The Quest for Tanelorn (1975)
- The Erekosë series (1970–1987), including:
  - The Eternal Champion (1970)
  - Phoenix in Obsidian, aka The Silver Warriors (1970)
  - The Swords of Heaven, the Flowers of Hell (with Howard Chaykin) (1979) (graphic novel)
  - The Dragon in the Sword (1987)
- The Corum series (1971–1974), including:
  - The Knight of the Swords (1971)
  - The Queen of the Swords (1971)
  - The King of the Swords (1971)
  - The Bull and the Spear (1973)
  - The Oak and the Ram (1973)
  - The Sword and the Stallion (1974)
- Behold the Man (1969)
- Breakfast in the Ruins (1972)
- The Time Dweller (1969)
- Sailing to Utopia, comprising:
  - Flux (1962)
  - The Ice Schooner (1966)
  - The Black Corridor (1969)
  - The Distant Suns (1975)
- The Wrecks of Time, aka The Rituals of Infinity (1967)
- The Multiverse Trilogy:
  - The Sundered Worlds, aka The Blood Red Game (1965)
  - The Fireclown, aka The Winds of Limbo (1965)
  - The Twilight Man, aka The Shores of Death (1966)
- Kane of Old Mars (1998 compilation volume originally published as three books in 1965, 346pp)
- The Lost Canal (novelette) (2013)
- The Chinese Agent (1970)
- The Russian Intelligence (1980)
- Michael Moorcock's Multiverse (1999) (graphic novel)
- The Metatemporal Detective (2007) (collection)
- A Nomad of the Time Streams:
  - The Warlord of the Air (1971)
  - The Land Leviathan (1974)
  - The Steel Tsar (1981)
- The Dancers at the End of Time sequence (1972–76):
  - An Alien Heat (1972)
  - The Hollow Lands (1974)
  - The End of All Songs (1976)
- Legends from the End of Time (1976)
- The Transformation of Miss Mavis Ming, aka A Messiah at the End of Time (1977)
- Moorcock's Book of Martyrs, aka Dying for Tomorrow (1976, American publication 1978)
- Sojan the Swordsman (juvenile) (1977)
- Gloriana (1978)
- The Golden Barge (revised 1979)
- My Experiences in the Third World War (1980)
- The Opium General and Other Stories (1984)
- Mother London (1988)
- Casablanca (1989) – short stories
- Lunching with the Antichrist (1995)
- Tales from the Texas Woods (1997)
- King of the City (2000)
- Silverheart (with Storm Constantine) (2000)
- London Bone (2001) – short stories
- Kaboul (first published in French) (2018)
- The Jerry Cornelius quartet of novels and shorter fiction:
  - The Final Programme (1969)
  - A Cure for Cancer (1971)
  - The English Assassin (1972)
  - The Condition of Muzak (1977)
  - The Cornelius Quartet (1977 compilation volume, 974pp)
  - The Adventures of Una Persson and Catherine Cornelius in the 20th Century (1976)
  - The Lives and Times of Jerry Cornelius (1976)
  - The Great Rock 'n' Roll Swindle, aka Gold Diggers of 1977 (1980)
  - The Entropy Tango (1981)
  - The Alchemist's Question (1984)
  - A Cornelius Calendar (1993 compilation volume, 554pp)
  - The New Nature of the Catastrophe (1993 anthology collecting Jerry Cornelius stories by Moorcock and others, edited by Moorcock and Langdon Jones, 448pp)
  - Firing the Cathedral (novella) (2002)
  - Phase 1: A Jerry Cornelius Story (novella) (2008)
  - Modem Times 2.0 (novella) (2011)
  - Pegging the President (novella) (2018)
  - The Fracking Factory (novella) (2018)
  - The Wokingham Agreement (novelette) (2022)
- The von Bek sequence:
  - The War Hound and the World's Pain (1981)
  - The Brothel in Rosenstrasse (1982)
  - The City in the Autumn Stars (1986)
- The Pyat Quartet:
  - Byzantium Endures (1981)
  - The Laughter of Carthage (1984)
  - Jerusalem Commands (1992)
  - The Vengeance of Rome (2006)
- The Second Ether sequence:
  - Blood: A Southern Fantasy (1994)
  - Fabulous Harbours (1995)
  - The War Amongst the Angels (1996)
- The Elric/Oona Von Bek sequence:
  - The Dreamthief's Daughter (2001)
  - The Skrayling Tree (2003)
  - The White Wolf's Son (2005)
- Doctor Who:
  - The Coming of the Terraphiles (2010)
- The Sanctuary of the White Friars
  - The Whispering Swarm (2015)
  - The Woods of Arcady (2023)
  - The Wounds of Albion (TBC)

With Mark Hodder he is also writing a series of thrillers set at different times in the 20th century featuring his character The Metatemporal Detective, including The Albino's Secret and The Albino's Honour, which involve a descendant of Elric (possibly Elric himself), published by Simon and Schuster beginning in 2025.

=== Anthologies edited ===
As well as a series of Best SF Stories from New Worlds and The Traps of Time (Hart-Davis), Moorcock has also edited other volumes, including two bringing together examples of pre-1914 invasion literature:

- Before Armageddon (1975)
- England Invaded (1977)

He also edited The Inner Landscape, featuring novellas by Peake, Aldiss and Ballard.

=== Nonfiction ===
- Letters From Hollywood (US: General Distribution Services, 1986, ISBN 0245543791), 240 pp
- Wizardry and Wild Romance: A Study of Epic Fantasy (UK: Gollancz, 1987, ISBN 0575041463), 160 pp., LCCN 88-672236
  - Wizardry and Wild Romance: A Study of Epic Fantasy, revised and expanded (US: MonkeyBrain Books, 2004, ISBN 1932265074), 206 pp., OCLC 57552226
- Fantasy: The 100 Best Books (London: Xanadu Publications, 1988, ISBN 0947761241; Carroll & Graf, 1988, ISBN 0881843350), James Cawthorn and Moorcock
- Into the Media Web: Selected short on-fiction, 1956–2006, edited by John Davey, introduced by Alan Moore, (UK: Savoy Books, 2010, ISBN 9780861301201) 718 pp
- London Peculiar and Other Nonfiction, Edited by Michael Moorcock and Allan Kausch, introduced by Iain Sinclair, (US: PM Press, 2012, ISBN 9781604864908), 377pp
