= The Final Programme =

1968 novel by Michael Moorcock

- First edition (US)
- Author: Michael Moorcock
- Language: English
- Series: The Cornelius Quartet
- Genre: Science fiction novel
- Publisher: Avon Books (US); Allison & Busby (UK)
- Publication date: March 1968 (US); October 1969 (UK)
- Publication place: United Kingdom
- Media type: Print (hardback)
- Pages: 191
- ISBN: 0-85031-012-1 (UK first edition)
- Followed by: A Cure for Cancer

The Final Programme is a novel by British science fiction and fantasy writer Michael Moorcock. Written in 1965 as the underground culture was beginning to emerge, it was not published for several years. Moorcock has stated that publishers at the time considered it was "too freaky".

It was the first of his Jerry Cornelius series of novels and stories and was originally published in paperback in the US by Avon Books in 1968 then in London in hardback by Allison & Busby in October 1969. It was made into a 1973 film of the same name (directed by Robert Fuest), but Moorcock was critical of the version released on the screen.

Set in a world less abstract and chaotic than depicted in the later volumes, it introduces Jerry Cornelius as a hip super agent playboy and follows his adventures as he attempts to subvert a plot by his disreputable brother Frank and Miss Brunner to build a super computer for nefarious ends. Jerry is sucked into the plans of Miss Brunner to create the perfect being by merging the bodies of Jerry and herself together. When this is done, a radiantly charismatic hermaphroditic being emerges from the machinery. All who see the new creature fall quaking to their knees. As things turn out, Jerry discovers that "it's a tasty world".

Contrary to the apparent chaos of the later Cornelius novels, The Final Programme is quite structured, being an alternative retelling of major episodes of the saga of Elric of Melniboné, with the various characters each taking roles similar to those of the earlier stories: Jerry as Elric, Catherine as Cymoril, and Miss Brunner as Stormbringer.

The first US edition (1968) of this work was censored. The 1976 US edition of The Final Programme included an introduction by Norman Spinrad. The novel was first published in its revised form in 1979. In 2008 Moorcock published the original unpublished first draft of the first part of the novel as Phase 1: A Jerry Cornelius Story in his short story collection Elric: To Rescue Tanelorn published by Del Rey.
