= The Final Programme (film) =

1973 film by Robert Fuest

- UK release quad poster
- Directed by: Robert Fuest
- Written by: Robert Fuest
- Based on: The Final Programme (1968 novel) by Michael Moorcock
- Produced by: John Goldstone; Sandy Lieberson
- Starring: Jon Finch; Jenny Runacre; Sterling Hayden; Harry Andrews; Hugh Griffith; Graham Crowden; Julie Ege; Patrick Magee
- Cinematography: Norman Warwick
- Edited by: Barrie Vince
- Music by: Beaver & Krause
- Production companies: Goodtimes Enterprises; Gladiole Films
- Distributed by: Anglo-EMI Film Distributors Ltd. (through MGM-EMI Distributors Ltd.)
- Release date: 4 October 1973 (UK)
- Running time: 94 minutes
- Country: United Kingdom
- Language: English
- Budget: £222,143
- Box office: £291,885

The Final Programme (released in the United States as The Last Days of Man on Earth) is a 1973 British black comedy science-fiction film written and directed by Robert Fuest, based on the 1968 novel by Michael Moorcock. It stars Jon Finch as Moorcock's fictional hero Jerry Cornelius, along with Jenny Runacre, Hugh Griffith, Patrick Magee, Sterling Hayden, Ronald Lacey, Harry Andrews, and Derrick O'Connor and Sarah Douglas in their film debuts.

The film was distributed in the UK by Anglo-EMI Film Distributors, and released on October 4, 1973. It received a lukewarm critical and commercial response, though its pop art production design was praised. Later criticism has described the film as a cult classic.

As of 2026, it is the only Moorcock novel to have reached the screen, and has been called "an interesting document of an important period in British science fiction literature."

== Plot ==
In Lapland, playboy physicist Jerry Cornelius attends the funeral of his father, a Nobel Prize–winning scientist who has developed the "Final Programme"—a design for a perfect, self-replicating human being. He is questioned by Dr Smiles, who wants to retrieve microfilm which he knows is in the Cornelius family home in England. Cornelius, a conspicuous counter-culture dandy with a fondness for chocolate biscuits and alcohol, threatens to blow up the family house. Flashbacks to Jerry's conversations with Professor Hira about the Kali Yuga inform the narrative, providing a philosophical background of the world in its final days. In various scenes we learn that the Vatican no longer exists and that Amsterdam has been razed to ash, and we see Trafalgar Square in a post-apocalyptic scenario of wrecked cars piled atop one another.

Back in Great Britain, a group of scientists led by Dr Smiles and the formidable Miss Brunner (who consumes her lovers) try to persuade Cornelius to locate the microfilm. Jerry learns from his family servant that his sister Catherine has been imprisoned by his evil, drug-addicted brother, Frank, and has addicted her to drugs for unspecified reasons. Jerry, whose relationship with Catherine is implied to be incestuous, instructs his servant John to smuggle Catherine to the lodge on the property's grounds; he will "take care of Frank". He consults Major Wrongway Lindbergh, who supplies him with a high-powered jet aircraft, and his old friend "Shades" who can supply him with napalm.

The attack on the old house commences. The house is protected by a sound system that induces pseudo-epilepsy, but Jerry and the others get inside unharmed. They fight their way past many traps, including poison gas and a lethal chessboard. Jerry finds John fatally wounded by Frank. John confesses before dying that Catherine has not been freed and that Frank has returned her to the bedroom. Jerry finds and confronts Frank, and a fight ensues. In the confusion, Catherine is accidentally killed by Jerry. Jerry is wounded, and Frank falls into the hands of Miss Brunner. She forces him to open the vaults, but he outsmarts her and escapes with the microfilm.

After Jerry recuperates, he meets with Miss Brunner. She introduces him to her new lover, Jenny and they plot to recapture Frank. Jenny is induced to play piano naked in Jerry's flat, where she is subsequently absorbed by Miss Brunner. Frank has set up a meeting to sell the microfilm to Dr Baxter; Jerry and Miss Brunner track them down and then Miss Brunner consumes Baxter. Another fight with Frank ensues and Frank is killed. Miss Brunner and Jerry return to Lapland by hot-air balloon with the recovered microfilm.

The scientists put the Final Programme into operation; the process requires that Miss Brunner be combined with another person to form a hermaphroditic being. Brunner chooses Jerry over the scientists' intended subject, Dmitri, and she traps Dmitri in a lethal steambath. Dmitri escapes Brunner's trap and fights Jerry, who is severely wounded. Brunner intervenes at the last moment, shooting Dmitri but not killing him. The scientists re-calibrate their experiment for Jerry, who is placed inside a large chamber with Brunner. As the process reaches its climax, the two subjects are bathed by solar radiation and blur into each other. The barely controlled process heats the equipment outside to destruction and the scientists are left either dead or insensible. A single being emerges from the chamber. Dmitri confronts the creature. Unseen at first, the being speaks with Jerry's voice. The creature does not know if it is a Messiah but is sure that its creation means the end of an age. When seen from the onlookers' perspective, the being is Jerry Cornelius, his body now altered to appear as a hunched, pre-modern hominid. The creature leaves Brunner's hidden base and observes that it is "a very tasty world".

== Cast ==
- Jon Finch as Jerry Cornelius
- Jenny Runacre as Ms. Brunner
- Hugh Griffith as Prof. Hira
- Patrick Magee as Dr. Baxter
- Sterling Hayden as Maj. Wrongway Lindbergh
- Ronald Lacey as Shades
- Harry Andrews as John
- Graham Crowden as Dr. Smiles
- George Coulouris as Dr. Powys
- Basil Henson as Dr. Lucas
- Derrick O'Connor as Frank Cornelius
- Sarah Douglas as Catherine Cornelius
- Sandy Ratcliffe as Jenny
- Julie Ege as Miss Dazzle
- Gilles Millinaire as Dmitri
- Sandra Dickinson as Waitress
- Olga Lowe as Hari (uncredited)

== Production ==
As of 2026, The Final Programme is the only film adaptation of Michael Moorcock's novels. The screen rights to the book were acquired by Goodtimes Enterprises, a UK production company headed by David Puttnam, Roy Baird and Sanford Lieberson, which had made Performance (1970) and The Pied Piper (1972). Lieberson says the film was his idea as "I loved Michael Moorcock's writing and I really liked the Jerry Cornelius character."

Finance came from EMI Films and the National Film Finance Corporation. EMI said they would finance the movie if Robert Fuest directed so they approached him. Fuest recalled, "I wanted to do a film which extended the fantasy that was a prerequisite of the Phibes films and Final Programme seemed to possess all the necessary elements." He felt "the book was very weird, but I thought it had possibilities."

Fuest was dissatisfied with various scripts calling them "believably awful" so he decided to write the script himself "and Michael Moorcock hated it."

Lieberson recalled that Fuest "insisted on not only directing but also designing it. I think he wrote it as well, I mean he got completely out of hand. He just became another person and decided he was going to be an auteur. Nice man, but he really went off the deep end on the movie. I thought it was an interesting film, though it lost me toward the end."

=== Music ===
Michael Moorcock has said that he originally envisioned space-rock band Hawkwind as providing the music for the entire film, and as also appearing in the scene with the nuns playing slot machines where Jerry is trying to buy napalm. Hawkwind, and Moorcock himself, can in fact be glimpsed briefly in this scene right at the back of the set. Director Robert Fuest, however, did not like the band, and replaced it with a jazz-inflected score by the duo Beaver & Krause.

== Release ==
According to Moorcock, the film was released as the top half of a double bill with Intimate Confessions of a Chinese Courtesan (1972). Later in the run The Final Programme was moved to the bottom half of the bill.

Roger Corman bought the film for release in the US through his New World Pictures, and removed 13 minutes.

=== Home video ===
The Final Programme was released on DVD and VHS formats in the US in 2001 by Anchor Bay Entertainment. The DVD featured a remastered print of the film, which could be played with an audio commentary featuring director Fuest and star Runacre. Other special features included the American theatrical trailer and TV spot, and an insert replica of the British poster.

On 7 October 2013, the Network imprint released the film on DVD in the UK. This release is presented in a new transfer from the original film elements, featuring both the 1.77:1 theatrical ratio and the full frame, as-filmed version of the main feature. Special features include original theatrical trailers, an Italian title sequence, image gallery, and promotional material in PDF format.

On 7 January 2020, Shout! Factory released the film on Blu-ray in the U.S. The aspect ratio of this release is 1.85:1. Special features include an audio commentary with director Robert Fuest and actress Jenny Runacre moderated by author/film historian Jonathan Sothcott, the U.S. theatrical trailer, and a U.S. TV spot, all carried over from the old Anchor Bay DVD.

In November 2025, the film was released on Ultra HD Blu-ray by Severin Films.

== Reception ==
=== Critical response ===
Alistair Whyte wrote in The Monthly Film Bulletin: "With his Dr. Phibes films, Robert Fuest achieved a certain amount of critical acclaim as well as good returns at the box-office. In The Final Programme he turns from horror to science fiction, but the ingredients are much the same – the use of established actors in cameo roles, the penchant for black comedy, the carefully composed shots, and the extraordinary sets designed by the director himself. There is, however, no Vincent Price – who stamped his personality on the Phibes films – and although Jon Finch struggles manfully, he does not have enough charisma to overcome the inconsistencies of the character he is playing. The film is undeniably elegant, but while certain sequences are effective, such as the visit to the strange Cornelius house, others are extended far beyond their dramatic purpose. Too often, the director is so concerned with the decorative qualities of his images that the plot is allowed to founder and any attempts at prophetic fantasy are forgotten."

Baird Searles found the film "an almost unmitigated disaster", with "an ending so inane that you will want your money back even if you wait and see it on television".

In The Radio Times Guide to Films David Parkinson gave the film 2/5 stars, writing: "The sight of the misshapen messiah will certainly send shudders down the spine of those who have stuck with the stylised imagery and apocalyptic incidents that comprise this baffling adaptation of one of Michael Moorcock's Jerry Cornelius stories. Jon Finch's bid to save both his sister and the planet is confounded by director Robert Fuest's preoccupation with look over logic."

On its DVD release in the UK in 2013, The Guardian wrote: "Director Robert Fuest was responsible for the pop-surrealism of The Avengers and the twisted art deco of Vincent Price's Dr Phibes movies, and here he makes sure every frame looks stunning, throwing so much in to please and confuse the eye, often at the cost of narrative coherence. But who cares when the movie is full of cryptic, sly humour and endlessly inventive imagery, such as an amusement arcade where nuns play fruit machines as the world ends."

=== Author's response ===
Michael Moorcock called the direction "shoddy and thick" and felt the performances were "patchy" but liked the casting. He commented that it was only when he told the actors it was supposed to be funny that they delivered lines with more of his intended black humour.

== Bibliography ==
- Earnshaw, Tony (August 2012). "Father of Dr Phibes". Fangoria. p. 22-25.
- Hardy, Phil (1995), The Overlook Film Encyclopedia: Science Fiction, The Overlook Press, p. 310-311, ISBN 0879516267
- Hochscherf, Tobias & Leggott, James (2011), British Science Fiction Film and Television: Critical Essays, McFarland & Company, Inc., p. 60-72, ISBN 9780786484836
- Hunter, I.Q. (1999), British Science Fiction Cinema (British Popular Cinema), Routledge, p. 210, ISBN 0415168686
- Willis, Donald C. (1985), Variety's Complete Science Fiction Reviews, Garland Publishing, Inc., p. 304, ISBN 9780824087128
- Pentkovich, Anthony (2004). "Robert Fuest he makes mad films". Psychotronic Video. No. 41. p. 34-40.
