= The Dancers at the End of Time =

Series of science fiction novels and short stories by Michael Moorcock

- Dust-jacket from the first edition.
- Author: Michael Moorcock
- Cover artist: Rodney Matthews
- Language: English
- Genre: Science fiction
- Publisher: Granada
- Publication date: 1981
- Publication place: United Kingdom
- Media type: Print (hardback & paperback)
- Pages: 663 pp
- ISBN: 0-583-13639-7 (paperback reprint edition)
- OCLC: 12522576

The Dancers at the End of Time is a series of science fiction novels and short stories written by Michael Moorcock, the setting of which is the End of Time, an era "where entropy is king and the universe has begun collapsing upon itself". The inhabitants of this era are immortal decadents, who create flights of fancy via the use of power rings that draw on energy devised and stored by their ancestors millions of years prior. Time travel is possible, and throughout the series various points in time are visited and revisited. Space travellers are also common, but most residents of the End of Time find leaving the planet distasteful and clichéd. The title of the series is itself taken from a poem by a fictitious 19th-century poet, Ernest Wheldrake, which Mrs. Amelia Underwood quotes in The End of All Songs. "Ernest Wheldrake" had been a pseudonym used by Algernon Charles Swinburne.

The original trilogy (An Alien Heat, The Hollow Lands, and The End of All Songs) was published between 1972 and 1976. The trilogy purports to tell the last love story in human history. Other stories in this sequence include The Transformation of Miss Mavis Ming (also known as A Messiah at the End of Time) which is a rewrite of the novella Constant Fire. Several short stories, some of which were included in the collection Legends from the End of Time, were published in New Worlds 7–10 (the paperback revival of the magazine). Short stories featuring Elric ("Elric at the End of Time"), and Jerry Cornelius ("The Murderer's Song") also feature characters and places from the End of Time.

Main characters in the series include Jherek Carnelian, one of the few humans at the End of Time to have been born naturally, rather than created; Mrs Amelia Underwood, a time traveller from the late 19th century; the enigmatic Lord Jagged; and Miss Mavis Ming in the eponymous The Transformation of Miss Mavis Ming, which also features the Fireclown. The 1993 Millennium omnibus edition of Legends from the End of Time ostensibly assembles all the stories and The Transformation of Miss Mavis Ming – under the title Constant Fire – but was affected by severe printing errors and omits the final six lines of Elric at the End of Time and all but the final chapter of Constant Fire. These were corrected for the 1997 Orion edition.

== The End of Time ==
The prologue of An Alien Heat calls it "a story of Jherek Carnelian, who did not know the meaning of morality, and Mrs. Amelia Underwood, who knew everything about it". The novel begins with a discussion between Jherek Carnelian and his mother, the Iron Orchid, about the meaning of the word virtuous. Carnelian, who has looked the word up in an ancient dictionary, finds the concept "bewildering".

Jherek meets his future love, Amelia Underwood, at an extravagant party hosted by the Duke of Queens, the theme of which is "disaster". The Duke of Queens intends the centerpiece of this entertainment to be an alien, Yusharisp, who tries to warn them that the universe will soon end; the people merely find this boring, and the entertainment falls flat. My Lady Charlotina freezes Yusharisp for transport to her menagerie. Jherek is delighted when Mrs. Amelia Underwood reacts to this by exclaiming "Let the poor creature go! Though he is neither human nor Christian, he is still one of God's creatures and has a right to his liberty!"

An example of how lightly sex, including incest and homosexuality, is treated at the End of Time can be found in the early chapters of An Alien Heat. In the chapter "A Conversation with the Iron Orchid" Jherek has sex with his mother, and in the chapter "Carnelian Conceives a New Affectation" he has a same-sex encounter with Lord Jagged. Likewise, in Legends from the End of Time, the Iron Orchid has sex with My Lady Charlotina. When Jherek decides to fall in love with Mrs. Underwood to the exclusion of everyone else, everyone applauds his original thinking.

== Landscape ==
The landscapes at the End of Time are almost entirely artificial or illusory, created by the inhabitants and constantly being altered. In the first chapter of An Alien Heat, the Iron Orchid and Jherek Carnelian awaken after the picnic they have created to find that the sea has been turned a shade of cerise, and the cliff with two palm trees that had previously been behind them had been replaced by a twelve-storey silver pagoda. Beneath the decoration, however, the Earth is a sterile wasteland lit by a dim red sun.

In the short story "Elric at the End of Time" the inhabitants of the end of time attempt to entertain Elric of Melniboné (and amuse themselves) by creating an adventure to keep Elric occupied. Elric is no stranger to chaos and is completely convinced that he has in fact been transported to a realm of chaos. This is largely due to the unexpected, bizarre (and often instantaneous) changes which his hosts make to the landscape.

== Plot ==
=== The Dancers at the End of Time ===
==== An Alien Heat ====
An Alien Heat
- Author: Michael Moorcock
- Language: English
- Series: Dancers at the End of Time
- Genre: Science fiction novel
- Publisher: MacGibbon & Kee
- Publication date: 1972
- Publication place: United Kingdom
- Media type: Print (hardback)
- Pages: 158 pp
- ISBN: 0-261-10015-7
- Followed by: The Hollow Lands

The title of this volume comes from the poem "Hothouse Flowers" by Theodore Wratislaw.

An alien named Yusharisp comes to Earth to warn its remaining inhabitants that the universe is coming to an end; his own planet has already disappeared, and the Earth is sure to follow. Earth's inhabitants are unfazed as they believe him to be yet another doomsayer; the End of the Earth has been predicted for centuries. Jherek is far more interested in Mrs Amelia Underwood, a time traveller from Victorian England, as he is fascinated by the Victorian era. Jherek resolves to fall in love with her. Mrs Underwood, at first repulsed by the debauchery of the End of Time, finally comes to believe that Jherek is sincere in his affections and starts teaching him about moral values. She falls in love with him at last; as they are about to embrace, however, she is returned to her own time. Jherek, heartbroken, decides to rescue her, and travels to 19th-century London, using the time machine from Moorcock's Behold the Man.

Jherek is inexperienced to the point of naiveté about the Victorian Era, despite his interest in it, and a (temporally) local thief, Snoozer Vine, tricks him into becoming an accomplice to Snoozer's latest scam. Not surprisingly, Jherek proves to be a poor criminal, and is quickly arrested, jailed and sent to trial. To his surprise, the judge appears to be none other than his friend, Lord Jagged, but claims to be one Jagger. Jherek is sentenced to death, as the case against him is unequivocal, but he cannot understand why all the people around him are so upset; inhabitants of the End of Time are immortal, and for them death is merely transitory. Jherek is hanged, only to wake up among his friends at the End of Time, who tell him that to them, he has only been gone for a second.

==== The Hollow Lands ====
The Hollow Lands
- Author: Michael Moorcock
- Cover artist: Mark Rubin
- Language: English
- Series: Dancers at the End of Time
- Genre: Science fiction novel
- Publisher: Harper & Row
- Publication date: 1974
- Publication place: United States
- Media type: Print (hardback)
- Pages: 182 pp
- ISBN: 0-06-013002-4
- Preceded by: An Alien Heat
- Followed by: The End of All Songs

The title of this volume comes from the poem "A Last Word" by Ernest Dowson.

Reunited at the end of Time, Jherek and the other inhabitants of the End of Time have returned to their preferred amusements of parties and games. They are interrupted by a ship of alien musician/pirates, the Lat. Hunted by the Lat, Jherek stumbles into a subterranean school built centuries ago to protect the last children of that era from the tyrant director Pecking Pa the Eighth (a reference to Sam Peckinpah). The time in the school is constantly recycled by a robot nanny so old she has started to break down, and as a result is recycling the same week repeatedly. The teacher-robot mistakes Jherek for one of her children as she has forgotten that there is anything outside her school, and keeps him. When she realises her mistake, she agrees to send him back to 1896; her ability to recycle time means that she can function as a time machine.

Returned to the 19th century, Jherek heads for Bromley, where Mrs Amelia Underwood lives. On the way, Jherek meets H. G. Wells and explains that he is a time traveller, but is met only with Wells's ironic disbelief. Jherek is finally reunited with Mrs Underwood but also forced to confront her husband Mr Underwood. Mr. Underwood is so suspicious of their story that a reluctant Mrs Underwood runs away with Jherek. Chased by the police, the two are rescued by a journalist, Mr Jackson who, like Judge Jagger, bears a strong resemblance to Lord Jagged.

The police catch up with the fleeing couple, but are interrupted in their attempted arrest by the appearance of the Lat, the Iron Orchid and a number of other residents of the End of Time. Chaos ensues as the police and the Lat start fighting, and the fabric of time itself begins disintegrating. The time travellers start vanishing, and Jackson, who finally reveals himself to be Lord Jagged (also Judge Jagger), takes Jherek and Mrs Underwood to a time machine that will take them to the End of Time. The machine appears to malfunction; instead of delivering them to the End of Time, it maroons them in what appears to be the Lower Devonian period.

==== The End of All Songs ====
The End of All Songs
- Author: Michael Moorcock
- Cover artist: Randall Richmond
- Language: English
- Series: Dancers at the End of Time
- Genre: Science fiction novel
- Publisher: Harper & Row
- Publication date: 1976
- Publication place: United States
- Media type: Print (hardback)
- Pages: 271 pp
- ISBN: 0-06-012999-9
- Preceded by: The Hollow Lands

The title of this volume comes from the poem "Dregs" by Ernest Dowson.

Jherek and Mrs Amelia Underwood, after spending some time alone in the Devonian, meet Una Persson and Captain Oswald Bastable, who introduce themselves as members of the Guild of Temporal Adventurers. They explain the notion of the multiverse as the combination of all simultaneously existing realities before sending Jherek and Amelia back to the End of Time. There, Jherek finds all his friends who had vanished from 1896 alive and well, except for Lord Jagged who has yet to return. Amelia is now more tolerant towards the people of the End of Time, though still occasionally revolted by their lack of morals. She and Jherek resume the life they led in An Alien Heat, which is interrupted by the sudden arrival of a shell shocked, crazed Mr Underwood, Inspector Springer and a dozen policemen, and the Lat.

Jherek, the Duke of Queens, the policemen, Amelia and Mr Underwood seek refuge from the Lat in one of the Lost Cities, which hold the energy used by the people of the End of Time to alter matter through their rings, and are surprised to find it crumbling, and the sun gone. They are joined by Yusharisp and the end-of-time resident Lord Mongrove, a manic-depressive giant who explains that the apocalypse has begun, and that they are the sole survivors. The group realises with horror that their energy rings are no longer working. In light of their impending doom, Amelia finally admits that her love for Jherek is more important to her than morals or convention.

The Iron Orchid and Lord Jagged, by now assumed to be dead, appear. Lord Jagged reveals himself to be Jherek's father, and a time traveller from the 21st century. After learning of the Earth's impending destruction, he sought to preserve humanity by sending a "new Adam and Eve" to the beginning of time, thus creating a loop that would prevent humanity from spending thousands of years relearning the basics of civilisation. For genetic reasons, he chose Jherek and Amelia and orchestrated their meeting. Amelia and Jherek's marooning in the Devonian was not part of the plan; they did not, in fact, travel back in time, but too far into the future, past the end of the world in which they were currently residing. Upon realising this, Jagged understood that time is circular, not linear as was previously assumed, and devised a new plan. While his friends are devastated, he shows unwavering optimism and surprises everyone by creating a new sun with his energy ring. He proceeds to explain that energy can be drawn from any existing reality within the multiverse; this, combined with the technology that "recycled" time in the underground school, can be used to sustain the Earth forever.

Now reassured that the Earth is safe in a time loop and provided with a new source of energy, the End of Timers resurrect their friends who died in the aborted apocalypse, and rebuild their world. Amelia, now comfortable at the End of Time, becomes popular. During a visit to Mr Underwood in the Lost City, she is faced with his conviction that she is damned when she tells him of her belief that God is dead. While she struggles with her conscience and her newfound atheism, her husband travels back to the 19th century and she decides to marry Jherek. When Lord Jagged offers to send both her and Jherek into the future, out of the time loop and after the end of the world to start a new civilisation, they accept.

=== Legends from the End of Time ===
Legends from the End of Time
- Author: Michael Moorcock
- Language: English
- Series: Dancers at the End of Time
- Genre: Science fiction short stories
- Publisher: Harper & Row
- Publication date: 1976
- Publication place: United States
- Media type: Print (hardback)
- Pages: 182 pp
- ISBN: 0-06-013001-6

Pale Roses begins with the destruction of the rainbow part of Werther de Goethe's creation Rain by the Everlasting Concubine, Mistress Christia, and Werther's despair. After a short interlude, Werther discovers, by the use of a parachute that closely resembles a Hot air balloon, a child (Catherine Lily Marguerite Natasha Dolores Beatrice Machineshop-Seven Flambeau Gratitude) who is the fourteen-year-old daughter of two time travellers, and deigns to take on the role of her now deceased parents.

Following a masquerade with the theme of Childhood, Werther is passionately overcome and engages in sexual intercourse with Catherine. After the event, disgusted by what he perceives to be the enormity of his acts, he is even more disgusted in Catherine for having enjoyed what she describes as le petit mal. The story climaxes with Werther's suicide by jumping from his tower unaided by his parachute and his subsequent resurrection.

It is then revealed that Catherine is really Mistress Christia in disguise, the series of events being an attempt to reconcile after her having destroyed his rainbow.

White Stars: after discovering that he had inadvertently destroyed one of Lord Shark the Unknown's experiments with lichen, the Duke of Queens offers to duel with him to rid himself of his guilt.

In Ancient Shadows, a time traveller, Dafnish Armatuce, and her son, Snuffles, arrive at the End of Time, and become involved with Miss Mavis Ming.

Paperback reprint of The Transformation of Miss Mavis Ming.

=== The Transformation of Miss Mavis Ming ===
The Transformation of Miss Mavis Ming
- Author: Michael Moorcock
- Cover artist: Rodney Matthews
- Language: English
- Series: Dancers at the End of Time
- Genre: Science fiction novel
- Publisher: W. H. Allen Ltd
- Publication date: 1977
- Publication place: United Kingdom
- Media type: Print (hardback)
- Pages: 159 pp
- ISBN: 0-491-01718-9

Chronicling the transformation of Miss Mavis Ming and the parts played by Doctor Volospion, his fellow residents at the End of Time, and Mr Emmanuel Bloom, also known as The Fireclown. The ending originally involved a scene where the main character, Mavis Ming, was whipped into submission by Bloom. This was later rewritten by the author. The novel has also been published, with differences, under the titles A Messiah at the End of Time and Constant Fire.

=== Elric at the End of Time ===
"Elric at the End of Time"
- Short story by Michael Moorcock
- Country: United States
- Language: English
- Genre: Science fiction short story

Publication
- Published in: Elsewhere, edited by Terri Winding & Mark Alan Arnold
- Publication type: Book
- Publisher: Ace Books
- Media type: Print (Paperback)
- Publication date: 1981

"Elric at the End of Time" is one of two Elric short stories included in the eponymous collection, Elric at the End of Time. Its characters include Elric, Una Persson, and Lord Jagged.

== Characters ==
=== Jherek Carnelian ===
Jherek Carnelian, son of the Iron Orchid and an unknown father (later revealed to be Lord Jagged) is the protagonist of the novels An Alien Heat, The Hollow Lands and The End of All Songs. Jherek is almost unique among the natives of The End of Time, in that he was born, rather than created. Only Werther De Goethe is mentioned as also having been born, implying that this trait is something of a rarity in this time period.

Jherek's childhood and adolescence subsequently provided a great deal of novelty and interest for the Iron Orchid and her clique, and left Jherek with a notable childlike freshness and creativity, compared to the majority of his contemporaries. This makes him something of a trend-setter among his peers. In particular, his fascination with the past has made him a recognised expert in the field – the nearest thing The End of Time has to a historian. He is particularly interested in the 19th and early 20th centuries. A million or more years of lost records and misinformation have taken their toll, however, and Jherek's attempts to recreate elements of the era are often comically inaccurate.

Jherek's entire existence is later revealed to be part of a complicated scheme of Lord Jagged's to survive the End of Time by selectively breeding a race of humans whose DNA renders them immune to the tendency for time to heal itself by rejecting time travellers who journey to the past, and flinging them forward to their point of origin, or beyond. This tendency is called the "Morphail Effect" and it is named after Dr. Brannart Morphail, a character in the novel.

Jherek may be an incarnation of Moorcock's recurring character Jerry Cornelius.

=== Mrs Amelia Underwood ===
A denizen of 19th century Bromley, she arrives at a party hosted by the Duke of Queens under mysterious circumstances after she is kidnapped from her own age. She is married to the stuffy Mr. Underwood, who becomes a comic presence in the second and third books. She is a lovely young woman and, although her Victorian upbringing has made a strict moralist of her, she gradually begins to thaw under Jherek's influence. In her childhood, she travelled with her father, a missionary, into exotic locations: these experiences planted the seeds of tolerance.

At first, her sense of duty makes her tolerate Jherek, despite his vexing romantic blandishments; she tells herself that, as a good Christian, she must indoctrinate him into the mysteries of Virtue. Later, her personality begins to blossom, and she realises she loves Jherek.

=== The Iron Orchid ===
The last woman to give birth on Earth, the Iron Orchid is Jherek's mother. Surprised that she had a child, she delights in her son, and encourages his creativity and endeavors. She is fond of Jherek's company, often having picnics with him.

=== Lord Jagged ===
Lord Jagged is a time traveller, and, unlike Jherek and the Iron Orchid, is not a native to the End of Time. He is the father of Jherek by the Iron Orchid, and is later shown to be manipulating various events that occur in the series.

In the short story, Elric at the End of Time, Lord Jagged assumes the persona of the chaos Lord Arioch, returning Elric to his own realm. Una Persson later compliments him on the imitation, saying:

Your disguise was wonderful, Jagged. How did you manage to imitate that character so thoroughly? It convinced Elric. He really thought you were whatever it was—a Chaos Duke? I mean, it's almost as if you were this fellow 'Arioch'...

Lord Jagged, however, does not reply to this. Instead, he "[puffs] on his pipe and [smiles] a secret and superior smile".

=== Werther de Goethe ===
Werther de Goethe is named for the main character of Goethe's novel The Sorrows of Young Werther and for Goethe himself, and is likewise angst ridden. He features as the main character in the short story "Pale Roses". Werther is the only other character from the end of time who was born, rather than created through the use of power rings.

=== Duke of Queens ===
The Duke of Queens is known throughout the End of Time for his outrageous creations. His first appearance is in An Alien Heat. After having adjusted the geography where the Iron Orchid and Jherek lunched and turning the sea into a deep pink, described as almost cerise, he is shown to be once more experimenting with artificial wings, to the chagrin of Iron Orchid, who wonders why he insists that they are a success.

=== My Lady Charlotina ===
My Lady Charlotina lives under the last permanent body of water on Earth, Lake Billy the Kid. Capricious, she often changes her skin tone to unusual colors. A jealous collector, she has one of the world's largest menageries of time and space travelers. She is the patron of Brannart Morphail whose laboratories share her apartments under the lake.

=== Brannart Morphail ===
Brannart Morphail is a self-styled scientist who specializes in Time and time travel. He is short, ugly, and has both a club foot and a hump. The Morphail Effect, a law of time that prevents time travel paradox, is named after him.

=== Mistress Christia, The Everlasting Concubine ===
Mistress Christia is the expression of feminine beauty at the end of time. Beloved by all at the End of Time, she is a favorite at gatherings, always being the first to arrive.

=== Bishop Castle ===
Formerly known as "King Rook", Bishop Castle has interest in all thing religious. He wears a ten-foot high mitre.

=== Lord Mongrove ===
Lord Mongrove appears as a sad hulking giant. Obsessed with darker emotions, his style in clothing and dwelling are depressing, gloomy affairs. He claims he has no friends, but appreciates Werther de Goethe's aesthetic.

=== Li Pao ===
Li Pao is a time traveler from the 23rd century. He is disgusted by the decadence and excesses of the people at the End of Time, and often chastises them for their amoral ways, despite always attending their parties and gatherings.

=== Miss Mavis Ming ===
Miss Mavis Ming appears in the short story "Ancient Shadows", playing host to Dafnish Armatuce and her son, Snuffles, and also in the novel The Transformation of Miss Mavis Ming, where she escapes from the machinations of Doctor Volospion. She has a small role in Moorcock's spy novel parody The Chinese Agent (1970), where she describes herself as a one-quarter Chinese former exotic dancer who used to perform a striptease under the name "Dawn Flower Ming, the Geisha Gusher".

Cover of the paperback reprint of the omnibus edition.

== Critical response ==
The book is included in Interzone editor David Pringle's Science Fiction: The 100 Best Novels (1985). Hari Kunzru, writing in the Guardian, described The Dancers at the End of Time trilogy as "one of the great postwar English fantasies".

== Appearances in other media ==
=== Books ===
- Caitlin R. Kiernan's 1995 short story "Giants in the Earth", a prequel to An Alien Heat, relates the societal debut of a 7-year-old Jherek Carnelian to the residents of the End of Time.
- In 2011, Rebel at the End of Time, another prequel to An Alien Heat and written by Steve Aylett, was published by PS Publishing. It shares a setting and several characters with Moorcock's sequence. The events of the novel, involving the arrival of a 21st-century revolutionary militant at the End of Time, are sufficiently inconsequential to have been mostly forgotten by the time An Alien Heat begins, with the exception of An Alien Heat's passing mention of a fleeting fad for flags.

=== Music ===
- Moorcock contributed vocals and harmonica to the Spirits Burning & Michael Moorcock albums An Alien Heat and The Hollow Lands. Most of the lyrics were lifted from or based on text in novels from his The Dancers at the End of Time trilogy. The albums were produced by Spirits Burning leader Don Falcone, and included contributions from Albert Bouchard and other members of Blue Öyster Cult, as well as former members of Hawkwind.
- The band Howlin' Rain features the song "Dancers at the End of Time" on their Magnificent Fiend album. The song's chorus is "Mrs. Amelia Underwood/Carry my heart in your hands/Jesus will shine on you brightly/Into the hollow lands".
