= The English Assassin: A Romance of Entropy =

1972 novel by Michael Moorcock

The English Assassin
- Dust-jacket from the first edition.
- Author: Michael Moorcock
- Cover artist: Richard Glyn Jones
- Language: English
- Series: Jerry Cornelius
- Genre: Literary fiction
- Publisher: Allison & Busby
- Publication date: 1972
- Publication place: United Kingdom
- Media type: Print (hardback)
- Pages: 254 pp
- ISBN: 0-85031-043-1
- OCLC: 591230
- Dewey Decimal: 823/.9/14
- LC Class: PZ4.M8185 En3 PR6063.O59
- Preceded by: A Cure for Cancer
- Followed by: The Condition of Muzak

The English Assassin: A Romance of Entropy is a 1972 novel by British fantasy and science fiction writer Michael Moorcock, first published in the UK by Allison & Busby and in the US by Harper & Row. Subtitled "A romance of entropy", it was the third part of his long-running Jerry Cornelius series.

Cornelius is the "English Assassin" of the title, although he spends much of the book near death himself. Darker in tone than other volumes in the series, the novel offers eight alternative catastrophes in a world of chaos and barbarous collapse. The usual glittering array of supporting characters such as the anarchist Una Persson, the occasionally evil Miss Brunner, Professor Hira and the grotesque Bishop Beesley make their appearances amid the rubble of swinging London with the rest of Jerry's colourful clan—his blousy mother, villainous brother Frank and the doomed angelic Catherine.

== Reception ==
Joanna Russ described the novel as "less vividly raw" but "sadder, stranger, more crafted, sometimes more beautiful, and far more complex" than the series' opening volume.
