= The Fireclown =

1965 novel by Michael Moorcock

The Fireclown or The Winds of Limbo
- cover of the first edition
- Author: Michael Moorcock
- Language: English
- Genre: Science fiction novel
- Publisher: Compact
- Publication date: 1965
- Publication place: United Kingdom
- Media type: Print (paperback)
- Pages: 189 pages
- ISBN: 0-583-12338-4 (reprint)
- OCLC: 315996808

The Fireclown (later published under the title The Winds of Limbo) is the fourth science fiction novel written by Michael Moorcock, published by Compact in 1965.

== Plot ==
The novel is based in a future where the majority of the human population live underground. Alan Powys works at the transport department. His grandfather, Simon Powys, is the minister for space transport and is the presumptive nominee for his party to succeed the current president. Alan's cousin Helen Curtis is leader of the Radical Liberal Movement, the government's opposition.

The arrival of the Fireclown in the lower levels of the underground city and his performances featuring fire captivate those who see it. He is thought by Simon Powys to be a dangerous rebel, his niece thinks conversely that the Fireclown is there to reignite people's passion for democracy.

A fire breaks out in the lower levels forcing the Government to shut them off, people revolt and the Fireclown flees. Unconvinced by his grandfather's, and the Government's, assertion that the Fireclown is a terrorist, Alan sets off to find the Fireclown for an explanation. Helen accompanies him providing a ship and desperate to believe the Fireclown is a great healer.

After arriving at an orbiting monastery they do, eventually, find the Fireclown. He takes them out in his specially designed starship The Pi-Meson and shows them at incredibly close quarters, the Sun's corona. It transpires that the Fireclown is neither a terrorist nor a saviour. After a private conversation with Alan, the Fireclown allows both him and Helen to return to Earth.

Upon returning they decide to try to find evidence that the Fireclown really was innocent in the matter of the fire in the lower levels. After travelling to London and attending a shadowy basement meeting, Alan discovers a plot to manipulate the public, acquire weapons of mass destruction and a very personal vendetta against the Fireclown stretching back many decades.

== Themes ==
The book covers various themes common to science fiction. Man's relationship to and reliance on technology figures in much of the philosophy of the Fireclown. The role of Government in regard to the truth and the role of the media in distorting that truth. Also various philosophical points are also raised, mainly by the Fireclown, regarding humans and their intelligence and whether that intelligence is really a necessity for survival.

== Other appearances ==
The character of the Fireclown is also featured in the novel The Transformation of Miss Mavis Ming (also known as A Messiah at the End of Time).

Michael Moorcock co-wrote a song with John Trivers and Eric Bloom called "The Great Sun Jester", which was based on a character in The Fireclown. The song appeared on the 1979 album Mirrors by Blue Öyster Cult. Also written by Bloom & Moorcock, the song "Veteran of the Psychic Wars" on the 1981 Blue Öyster Cult album "Fire of Unknown Origin" mentions "The Winds of Limbo", the novel's later title.

Pink Floyd released a song entitled "Set the Controls for the Heart of the Sun" on their 1968 album A Saucerful of Secrets, the song title taken from The Fireclown.
