= The Condition of Muzak =

1977 novel by Michael Moorcock

- Dust-jacket from the first edition.
- Author: Michael Moorcock
- Cover artist: Richard Glyn Jones
- Language: English
- Series: Jerry Cornelius
- Genre: Literary fiction
- Publisher: Allison & Busby
- Publication date: 1977
- Publication place: United Kingdom
- Media type: Print (hardback)
- Pages: 313 pp
- ISBN: 0-85031-044-X
- OCLC: 3098365
- Dewey Decimal: 823/.9/14
- LC Class: PZ4.M8185 Co PR6063.O59
- Preceded by: The English Assassin

The Condition of Muzak is a novel by British fantasy and science fiction writer Michael Moorcock, published by Allison & Busby in 1977. It is the final novel of his long-running Jerry Cornelius series. It was first published in its revised form in 1979.

The novel won the 1977 Guardian Fiction Prize. The title refers to Walter Pater's maxim: "All art constantly aspires towards the condition of music" and Moorcock's travesty of the quote in A Cure for Cancer: "All art [...] aspires to the condition of muzak."

== Overview ==
The chaos and decay that permeated Moorcock's A Cure for Cancer and The English Assassin has devolved further into a surreal Europe of splintered city states. Jerry Cornelius, increasingly morphing into his role as Pierrot, has lost the power to change or even affect events and narrows his quest to an everlasting search for his true love, his sister Catherine.

== Reviews ==
In his review in The Times Tom Hutchinson wrote: "The Condition of Muzak considers the process of living as a harlequinade and is, for me, a most moving summation... Here we move through Mr Moorcock's obsessions, the serials of Fantômas, the Beatles, Bob Dylan, the Arthurian legend, through chronos-zones—behold the pun!—to bi-sexuality, with a small sideswipe at Stanley Kubrick on the way. The realisation comes that Jerry is seeking sanctuary in different universes of Time in separate private mythologies. As indeed, is the implication, are we all".

In a piece in The Guardian, Barry Cole was "struck by the singular fact that out of science fantasy or science fiction has emerged (J. G. Ballard and Kurt Vonnegut have similarly developed) a writer who has managed to supersede conventional science fantasy and yet make of traditional fiction something wholly new".

Writing in The Observer, Angus Wilson called it "one of the most ambitious, illuminating and enjoyable works of fiction published in English since the war".
