= Firing the Cathedral =

2002 novella by Michael Moorcock

- Cover of the first edition.
- Author: Michael Moorcock
- Cover artist: Richard M. Powers
- Language: English
- Series: Jerry Cornelius
- Genre: Literary fiction novella
- Publisher: PS Publishing
- Publication date: 2002
- Publication place: United Kingdom
- Media type: Print (hardback and paperback)
- Pages: 112 pp
- ISBN: 1-902880-44-7
- OCLC: 224660521

Firing the Cathedral is a novella by British fantasy and science fiction writer Michael Moorcock. It is part of his long-running Jerry Cornelius series.
