= A Cure for Cancer =

1971 novel by Michael Moorcock

- Dust-jacket from the first edition.
- Author: Michael Moorcock
- Language: English
- Series: Jerry Cornelius
- Genre: Literary Fiction
- Published: 1971 (Allison & Busby)
- Publication place: United Kingdom
- Media type: Print (hardback)
- Pages: 256 pp
- ISBN: 0-85031-026-1
- OCLC: 446616
- Dewey Decimal: 823/.9/14
- LC Class: PZ4.M8185 Cu PR6063.O59
- Preceded by: The Final Programme
- Followed by: The English Assassin

A Cure for Cancer is a novel by British fantasy and science fiction writer Michael Moorcock, first published in 6a Noel Street, London 1971 by Allison & Busby Ltd. The book is part of Moorcock's long-running Jerry Cornelius series.

The second novel of the sequence is essentially a collage of absurdist vignettes, many of which first appeared in an eclectic range of British and American magazines. (Edited by Noble.)

== Plot ==
Jerry inhabits a world at war with itself and, armed only with an occasional "vibragun" appears to fight "against history" for the freedom of "randomness" against the straitlaced conventions exemplified by his brother Frank. In the end Jerry's quest, oblique as it is, is perhaps more artistic than political.
