= Stormbringer (disambiguation) =

Stormbringer is a magical sword featured in fantasy stories by Michael Moorcock.

Stormbringer may also refer to:

- Stormbringer (novel), a 1965 novel by Michael Moorcock
- Stormbringer (role-playing game) by Chaosium, based on Moorcock's stories
- Stormbringer (album), a 1974 album by Deep Purple
- Stormbringer!, a 1970 album by John and Beverley Martyn
- Stormbringer (video game), written by David Jones and released in 1987 by Mastertronic
- The Transformers: Stormbringer, a comic book miniseries published by IDW Publishing
