= Elric (disambiguation) =

Elric of Melniboné is a fictional character created by Michael Moorcock.

Elric may also refer to:

== Characters ==
- Elric, a character in the Babylon 5 episode "The Geometry of Shadows"
- Kid Colt (Elric Freedom Whitemane), a Marvel Comics character
- Alphonse Elric, a main character of the manga series Fullmetal Alchemist
- Edward Elric, a main character of the manga series Fullmetal Alchemist
- Trisha Elric, a character in the manga series Fullmetal Alchemist

== Games ==
- Elric!, a 1993 role-playing game published by Chaosium
- Elric: Battle at the End of Time, a 1977 board game published by Chaosium

== People ==
- Elric Hooper (born 1936), New Zealand director and actor
- Elric Prince, founder of the American record label Poe Boy Entertainment
- Elric Robichon, Canadian film and television editor
- Elric van Vuuren (born 1985), South African rugby union player

== Other uses ==
- Elric: Song of the Black Sword, a 1995 short story collection by Michael Moorcock
- "Elric the Enchanter", a song by Hawkwind from the 1985 album The Chronicle of the Black Sword

== See also ==
- Elrick (name)
