= Ork (video game) =

1991 video game

- Developer: WJS Design
- Publisher: Psygnosis
- Platforms: Amiga, Atari ST
- Release: 1991
- Genre: Platform
- Mode: Single-player

Ork is a video game made for the Amiga and Atari ST personal computers. It was developed by WJS Design and published by Psygnosis in 1991.

Ork is a platform game with 5 levels. It takes place on an alien planet called Cisskei, where the main character, an alien called Ku-Kabul, must find his way through each level. The levels are filled with tasks such as solving the puzzles or fighting enemies.

Ku-Kabul is equipped with a machine gun and a jetpack with limited ammunition and fuel, necessitating careful use of tools until the game allows the player to restock their items.

Keeping with Psygnosis's tradition of including references to earlier games, the third level of Ork includes a moment where Lemmings spawn, walk a few dozen metres, then jump off a cliff.

The theme music is composed by Tim Bartlett. The cover artwork for Ork consists of the image Behemoth's World, which was painted by Richard Clifton-Dey, and was previously used as the cover for Blue Öyster Cult's 1980 album Cultösaurus Erectus.
