= Michael Kirkbride =

Video and Tabletop Game Writer & Artist

- Education: University of Alabama in Huntsville
- Years active: 2000-2006
- Employer: Bethesda Softworks
- Known for: The Elder Scrolls IV: Oblivion The Elder Scrolls III: Morrowind; The Elder Scrolls V: Skyrim (uncredited) The Elder Scrolls Adventures: Redguard

Michael Kirkbride is a game writer, artist, and designer best known for his work with Bethesda Softworks. Kirkbride has worked on numerous games in The Elder Scrolls series, most prominently The Elder Scrolls III: Morrowind, and Redguard. Kirkbride's work is notable as he established a large chunk of the lore of the Elder Scrolls. Especially in early days, as he provided numerous books, articles, and pieces of lore for Morrowind. Kirkbride's work on "The Pocket Guide to the Empire, 1st Edition" is also important as it became a large part of lore for the different regions of Tamriel.

Kirkbride has also contributed artwork to supplements for the tabletop game Elric! such as Melniboné, and supplements for the tabletop game Fading Suns. He contributed artwork to the 1994 card game On the Edge.

== Career ==
In the year 2000, Michael Kirkbride was working as a background artist for Bethesda Softworks, of which he said "I'm building playgrounds for the characters [...] We draw and construct environments to the design team's specifications. Background artists work hand in hand with the level designer to create environments that fit the game."

Kirkbride worked on The Elder Scrolls series for Bethesda, saying that on The Elder Scrolls II: Daggerfall "My only real task was taking scans of famous paintings and Penthouse pinups and altering them enough so that we wouldn't get sued for using them as tapestries [...] To this day, I think altering a 64x64 pixel Girl with a Pearl Earring into an Argonian princess is a highlight of my career. I also drew the ire of Julian LeFey [project leader on Daggerfall] by putting clothes on all the pinup girls. He [...] wanted live-action cutscenes of people having intercourse to play whenever you got married or hired a prostitute." Kirkbride says that of the next two games in the Elder Scrolls series, "I will always be partial to Morrowind" but that "One day Oblivion will be written off as a big, Lord of the Rings-obsessed, poison-induced fever dream of Uriel VII during the final moments of his life."

Kirkbride worked as the concept artist on The Elder Scrolls III: Morrowind, developing large portions of the Morrowind world and writing books about the game and setting. Ken Rolston suggested that the tabletop game RuneQuest was an inspirational source for Kirkbride and the other creators as they worked on Morrowind. Kirkbride has written a significant amount of official and unofficial lore for Elder Scrolls. Kirkbride was also the main writer for Morrowind. Elder Scrolls III was originally going to be set in the home of the High Elves known as the Summerset Isles, but Kirkbride was one of the team members who instead pushed for the game to be set on the volcanic island of Vvardenfell which made the game set in Morrowind. Kirkbride wanted to fill the world with unusual monsters and drew two versions of each monster in case the stranger version was rejected.

Kirkbride has communicated with the team members developing Skywind, assisting lore masters in assuring that the game fits with the established Elder Scrolls universe.

Although he has left the studio, he continued to write at the Elder Scrolls fansite The Imperial Library.

== See also ==
- Todd Howard
- ZeniMax Media
