= The Bronze Grimoire =

1994 Fantasy tabletop role-playing game supplement for Elric!

Magic and the Supernatural
- Cover by Charlie Krank
- Designers: Ross Isaacs; Lynn Willis; Mark Morrison
- Publishers: Chaosium
- Publication: 1994; 32 years ago
- Genres: Fantasy
- Systems: Basic Role-Playing
- ISBN: 978-1568820293

The Bronze Grimoire, Magic and the Supernatural, is a fantasy sourcebook for the Elric! roleplaying game, written by Ross Isaacs, Lynn Willis, and Mark Morrison, and published by Chaosium in 1993. It is based on the Elric of Melniboné books by Michael Moorcock.

== Contents ==
The Bronze Grimoire provides new and expanded magic rules for Elric!. It includes runes, necromancy, fifty new spells, demons, demonic abilities, enchantments, tomes, and a set of unique magic items.

== Publication history ==
Chaosium published Elric!, a fantasy role-playing game based on the Elric of Melniboné novels by Michael Moorcock, in 1993. The following year, Chaosium released the supplement The Bronze Grimoire, an 80-page softcover book designed by Ross Isaacs, Lynn Willis and Mark Morrison, with interior art by Ben Monroe and cover art by Charlie Krank.

== Reception ==
In the October 1995 edition of Dragon (Issue #222), Rick Swan thought The Bronze Grimoire was "essential" for players of Elric! because of the new spells, and because the book "clarifies some of the game's murkier concepts." However, Swan thought the book lacked "staging tips, setting notes, or a unifying theme." He also noted that players needed to be familiar with the original Elric novels in order to understand some of the material. Swan concluded by giving the book an average rating of 4 out of 6.

In Issue 21 of Australian Realms, Adam Whitt thought the book was "well written with the dark panache we've come to expect for this game of dark fantasy, and it is generously illustrated with images appropriate to the game's macabre mood." Whitt enjoyed the "generous helping of black humour in the style of Michael Moorcock." Whitt's one complaint was a need for "more campaign background information included and advice for the referee on how best to use this new material in their existing games." Despite this, Whitt concluded on a positive note, saying, "This is a versatile, ideas rich, role-playing supplement. Well worth the asking price."

In Issue 84 of the French games magazine Casus Belli, Tristan Lhomme found the chapter on necromancy to be the most interesting part, especially the "specific rules, spells and creatures." But Lhomme warned that the fifty new spells included "things capable of demolishing a scenario if the players use them too brilliantly." Lhomme found the new magic items too derivative of Advanced Dungeons & Dragons, and the chapter on magical tomes too short. Lhomme concluded "The whole thing is interesting, but you better use it with caution, reserving the most powerful elements for non-player characters, and distilling the rest very cautiously throughout the scenarios."
