= The Broken Sword =

1954 fantasy novel Poul Anderson

- Dust-jacket from the first edition.
- Author: Poul Anderson
- Language: English
- Genre: Fantasy
- Publisher: Abelard-Schuman
- Publication date: 5 November 1954
- Publication place: United States
- Media type: Print (hardback)
- Pages: 274
- ISBN: 0-575-07425-6
- OCLC: 59499019

The Broken Sword is a fantasy novel by American writer Poul Anderson, originally published on 5 November 1954. A revised edition was issued by Ballantine Books in January 1971 as the twenty-fourth volume of their Ballantine Adult Fantasy series. The original text was reissued by Gollancz in 2002. Set during the Viking Age, the novel features numerous references to Norse mythology.

== Plot ==
The book tells the story of Skafloc, an elven-fosterling and the biological son of Orm the Strong. The narrative begins with Orm's marriage to Aelfrida of the English. After killing a witch's family to take their land, Orm later half-converts to Christianity but quarrels with the local priest and drives him away. Meanwhile, an elf named Imric, aided by the witch, plots to abduct Orm's newborn son. In the child's place, Imric leaves a changeling named Valgard. The real son is taken to the elven lands and raised as Skafloc. As the story progresses, both Skafloc and Valgard play key roles in the war between the trolls and the elves.

== Writing style ==
The original 1954 text is known for its unique prose styling which makes liberal use of archaic words, spellings and phrasings. Examples include spelling "fairy" as "faerie", the word "glaive" in place of "sword", and archaic phrasing such as the word "will" in place of "want". The 1971 revised text frequently replaces and at times altogether removes some of these stylings. Author Poul Anderson explained these alterations in the introduction to the 1971 edition, referring to his younger self in the third person:

A generation lies between us. I would not myself write anything so headlong, so prolix, and so unrelievedly savage. This young, in many ways naive lad who bore my name could, all unwittingly, give readers a wrong impression of my work and me. At the same time, I don't feel free to tamper with what he has done.

== Reception and influence ==
Anthony Boucher praised the original edition as "a magnificent saga of the interplay of gods, demigods, faerie, heroes and men." Groff Conklin described the novel as "a rip-snorting, bloody, imitation-Norse epic containing all the elements of faerie". E. F. Bleiler, commenting on the 1971 revised edition, declared that "The first portion of this novel is perhaps the finest American heroic fantasy, with good characterizations, excellent surface detail, good plotting, and an admirable recreation of the mood of the Old Norse literature. But the story ends in a mad scramble and unconvincing slaughter".

British fantasy writer Michael Moorcock has written that The Broken Sword greatly influenced his stories; Moorcock's Elric of Melniboné series features a magic sword, Stormbringer, which has many similarities to Skafloc's sword. Moorcock further declared The Broken Sword superior to Tolkien, calling it "a fast-paced doom-drenched tragedy in which human heroism, love and ambition, manipulated by amoral gods, elves and trolls, led inevitably to tragic consequences." Despite his admiration of the original 1954 edition, Moorcock criticized the revised 1971 text, stating that the revised edition "weakened" the novel. Many others agreed with him and the original text remains, for most readers, definitive.

Diana Paxson stated that reading The Broken Sword as a teen "changed [her] life", and led to her involvement in fantasy as a genre.

Fantasy historian Brian Murphy has described The Broken Sword as "arguably the greatest novel-length work today that could be classified as sword and sorcery." He also notes that the novel closely follows the style of the Icelandic sagas, although with more magic and monsters than those sagas usually featured. Murphy noted that The Broken Sword influenced later writers of sword and sorcery fiction, including Moorcock, Karl Edward Wagner, and Richard K. Morgan.

== Adaptation ==
A partial adaptation of the novel, done as a serialized black-and-white graphic novel, was created by fantasy writer Tom Reamy and illustrated by professional fantasy artist George Barr. This was published during the mid-to-late 1960s over several issues of Reamy's twice Hugo Award–nominated science fiction fanzine Trumpet; the adaptation was never completed, though there were revived plans underway to do so at the time of Reamy's death in late 1977.

== General sources ==
- Tuck, Donald H. (1974). The Encyclopedia of Science Fiction and Fantasy. Chicago: Advent. p. 9.
