= Sunraven =

Studio album by Grand Magus
- Released: 18 October 2024
- Genre: Heavy metal
- Length: 35:13
- Label: Nuclear Blast
- Producer: Staffan Karlsson

Grand Magus chronology
Wolf God (2019)	Sunraven (2024)

Professional ratings
Review scores
Source	Rating
Metal Hammer Germany	5/7 stars
Norway Rock Magazine	4/6 stars
Scream Magazine	4/6 stars
Imperiumi	6/10
Metal.de	7/10
Powermetal.de	7.5/10
Rock Hard	8.5/10

Sunraven is the tenth full-length album by Swedish heavy metal band Grand Magus. It was released on 18 October 2024 on Nuclear Blast.

== Track listing ==
1. "Skybound" - 3:28
2. "The Wheel of Pain" - 3:23
3. "Sunraven" - 3:37
4. "Winter Storms" - 5:15
5. "The Black Lake" - 5:34
6. "Hour of the Wolf" - 4:03
7. "Grendel" - 3:32
8. "To Heorot" - 3:00
9. "The End Belongs to You" - 3:21
