= Stormbringer (role-playing game) =

Tabletop role-playing game

Fantasy Roleplaying in the World of Elric
- 4th edition box cover illustrated by Michael Whelan, 1977.
- Designers: Ken St. Andre; Lynn Willis; et al.
- Publishers: Chaosium; Mongoose Publishing
- Publication: 1981 Stormbringer (1st ed.); 1985 Stormbringer (2nd ed.); 1987 Stormbringer (3rd ed.); 1990 Stormbringer (4th ed.); 1993 (Elric!); 2001 Stormbringer (5th ed.); 2007 Elric of Melniboné (1st ed.); 2010 Elric of Melniboné (2nd ed.)
- Genres: Fantasy
- Systems: Basic Role-Playing

Stormbringer is a fantasy tabletop role-playing game published under license by Chaosium. Based on the Elric of Melniboné books by Michael Moorcock, the game takes its name from Elric's sword, Stormbringer (though one edition was published as Elric!). The rules are based on Chaosium's percentile-dice-based Basic Role-Playing system.

== Description ==
The campaign starts when the world is only ten years from utter and inescapable destruction. Like Elric in the original Moorcock novels, the player characters will, during the course of play, be offered weapons, powers, spells, and quests that offer great power, but always at a cost. By engaging with these pacts, a high-level character might reach the stage where they can no longer miss a sword swing, no longer take damage from weapons or poisons, nor be outwitted.

As RPG historian Stu Horvath noted in his 2023 book Monsters, Aliens, and Holes in the Ground, the world's oncoming doom and the ability to create pacts with dark forces to become unstoppable and invulnerable "seduces players by offering a way around the randomness that so often frustrates their ambitions and, in giving them that power, sets their fate and damns them. It is a rare thing for a Stormbringer character not to be utterly consumed by their choices, just like Elric."

The first three editions of the game use a variant of Chaosium's Basic Roleplaying, with revised rules for magic and other setting-specific elements.

The fourth edition changes the magic system extensively. The edition retitled Elric! is a substantial reworking of the game, and the fifth edition of Stormbringer uses the Elric! rules with additional material from several older, out-of-print supplements incorporated.

== Publication history ==
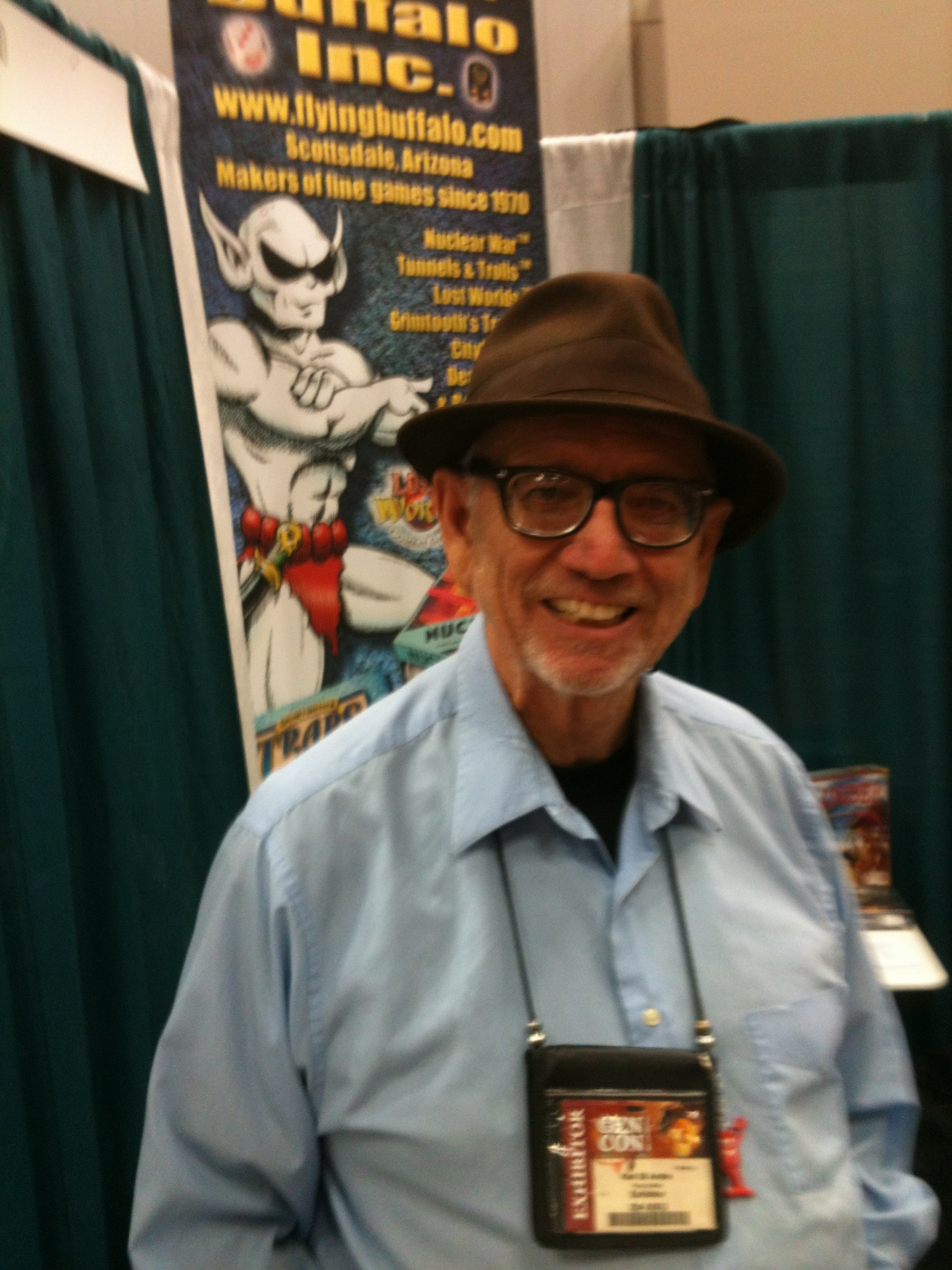
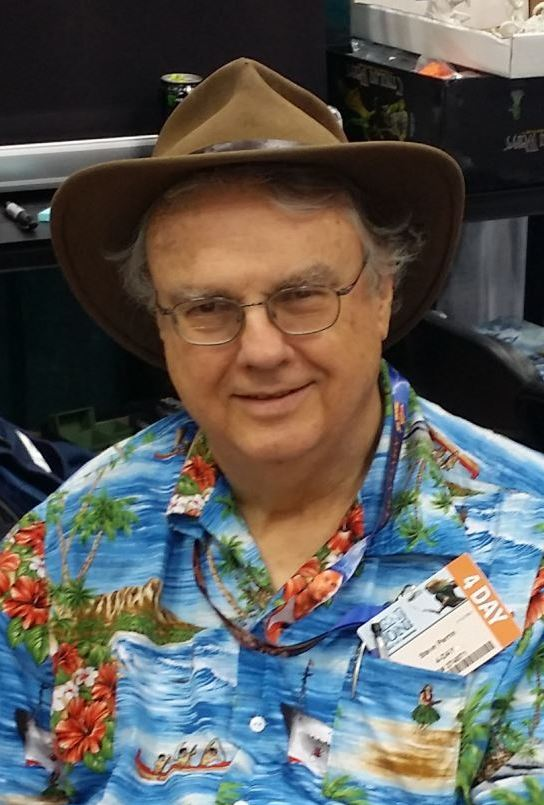
Ken St. Andre and Steve Perrin designed Stormbringer.

Michael Moorcock began writing novellas about the doomed anthihero Elric in 1961, but the publication of his first novel, Elric of Melniboné in 1972 found a wider audience.

Chaosium, founded in 1975, obtained the license to produce games about Moorcock's Eternal Champion stories, and published a licensed boardgame titled Elric in 1977.

Four years later, Chaosium produced the role-playing game Stormbringer. There have been several editions of the game:

- 1st edition (1981) by Ken St. Andre and Steve Perrin; boxed set
- 2nd edition (1985) by St. Andre; boxed set
- 3rd edition (1987) by St. Andre, published jointly with Games Workshop
- 4th edition (1990) by St. Andre, Steve Perrin, and John B. Monroe; boxed set
- Elric! (1993) by Lynn Willis, Richard Watts, Mark Morrison, Jimmie W. Pursell Jr., Sam Shirley, and Joshua Shaw.
- 5th edition (2001) by Lynn Willis

Chaosium planned to produce role-playing games about all of Moorcock's other "champions", but the only game to be published was Hawkmoon in 1986.

In 2007 Chaosium dropped their Eternal Champion license, and it was picked up by Mongoose Publishing. In August 2007, Mongoose published Elric of Melniboné by Lawrence Whittaker, which is based on Mongoose's first edition of RuneQuest. A second edition by Lawrence Whittaker and Pete Nash was published in 2010, based on Mongoose's second edition of Runequest. This was discontinued when Mongoose lost the RuneQuest license in 2011.

In 2012, Le Département des Sombres Projets published Mournblade, a game set in the Young Kingdoms. It uses the choose your dice system, and has no connexion to BRP.

== Publications ==
- Stormbringer Companion (1983)
- Black Sword (1985)
- Demon Magic: The Second Stormbringer Companion (1985)
- The Octagon of Chaos (1986)
- Stealer of Souls (1986)
- The Shattered Isle (1987)
- White Wolf: Temples, Demons, & Ships of War (1987)
- Rogue Mistress (1991)
- Sorcerers of Pan Tang (1991)
- Sea Kings of the Purple Towns (1992)

== Reception ==
In the February–March 1982 edition of White Dwarf (Issue #29), Murray Writtle gave it an average overall rating of 7 out of 10, and stated that "So, if you want to have single death or glory adventures in the Young Kingdoms, Stormbringer will give you them, but to get a continuing campaign underway will take a certain amount of rewriting and careful thought."

In the January–February 1985 edition of Different Worlds (Issue #38), Keith Herber gave it a top rating of 4 stars out of 4, saying, "I thought 'Stormbringer' not only an excellent adaptation of the Elric series but also found it an extremely enjoyable game. If you have ever read an Elric book (or one of Moorcock's related novels) and wished it could be a game, this is it. If you haven't read one yet do so and then consider the game. You may not find the 'doomed' atmosphere to your liking, but around this neighborhood there is a growing movement for a permanent Stormbringer campaign."

In the August 1987 edition of White Dwarf (Issue #92), Jim Bambra called the percentile-based skill resolution system "quick and simple to play." He also liked the experience system, calling it "simple and easy to use with no unwieldy book-keeping required between game sessions." He concluded with a strong recommendation, saying, "Come and enter the world of Elric, you won't be disappointed."

In his 1990 book The Complete Guide to Role-Playing Games, game critic Rick Swan commented, "The bloodthirsty cultists, brutish slave owners, and slovenly drug takers of the Young Kingdoms are a far cry from the friendly wizards and adorable elves populating most other fantasy settings, and designers Ken St. Andre and Steve Perrin have done a chillingly effective job of bringing it all to life." Swan especially liked the magic system, as well as the rules around plant lore, but warned "This is not a game for beginners; the rules presume familiarity with role-playing." Swan concluded by giving this game an excellent rating of 3.5 out of 4, saying, "Sophisticated players, particularly those familiar with the Moorcock novels, should find Stormbringer to be an exceptionally rich and entertaining experience."

Stewart Wieck reviewed the 4th edition of Stormbringer in White Wolf #21 (June/July 1990), rating it a 4 out of 5 and stated that "This new edition of Chaosium's wonderful Stormbringer game is attractively presented as a 200-page softbound book in the manner of most of Chaosium's new products."

In a 1996 poll of readers conducted by the British games magazine Arcane to determine the 50 most popular roleplaying games of all time, Stormbringer was ranked 25th. Editor Paul Pettengale commented: "A simplified RuneQuest, only set in Elric's world. It captures the spirit of the books, but to play it properly you really need to be familiar with the novels, and they are of the type of fantasy that you either love or loathe."

James Davis Nicoll in 2020 for Black Gate said "Meeting Elric and his soul-eating demon sword was not recommended. In fact, although it was best not to think about it, all PCs who did not somehow flee their home plane were ultimately doomed thanks to the well-meaning, mopey albino protagonist of the series."

== See also ==
- Hawkmoon (role-playing game)
- Dragon Lords of Melniboné
