= Elric: Song of the Black Sword =

Elric: Song of the Black Sword is a story collection by Michael Moorcock published by White Wolf in 1995.

== Plot summary ==
Elric: Song of the Black Sword is a collection of stories about Elric as Prince of Melnibone.

== Publication history ==
Elric: Song of the Black Sword is the fifth collected volume of the Eternal Champion series, including the first six Elric stories ordered not by original publication, but in the order in they occurred chronologically: "Elric of Melniboné", "The Fortress of the Pearl", "The Sailor on the Seas of Fate", "The Dreaming City", "While the Gods Laugh", and "The Singing Citadel".

== Reception ==
Andy Butcher reviewed Elric: Song of the Black Sword for Arcane magazine, rating it a 9 out of 10 overall. Butcher comments that "if you have any interest at all in fantasy literature, this volume is as much required reading as Tolkien's Lord Of The Rings. Moorcock's work has been at least as influential, and Elric in particular is one of the best-known characters in the genre. Moorcock's writing style may not be the best, but these are classic stories, and are just as fresh and imaginative today as they ever were".

== Reviews ==
Review by Howard V. Hendrix (1996) in The New York Review of Science Fiction, October 1996.
