= Elbrick =

Elbrick is a surname. Notable people with the surname include:

- Charles Burke Elbrick (1908–1983), American diplomat
- Xanthe Elbrick (born 1978), English actress

== See also ==
- Elrick (name)
