= White Wolf: Temples, Demons, & Ships of War =

White Wolf: Temples, Demons, & Ships of War is a 1987 role-playing game supplement published by Chaosium for Stormbringer.

== Contents ==
White Wolf: Temples, Demons, & Ships of War is a supplement in which a campaign setting with adventure scenarios is compatible with both Stormbringer and Hawkmoon. It explores three distinct temples—Chaos, Law, and the Eternal Flame—each reflecting foundational metaphysical forces in the game world. New rules are provided for travel and naval combat. It includes the scenario "Escape from Yellow Hell" and updated statistics for the character Elric.

== Publication history ==
White Wolf: Temples, Demons, & Ships of War was written by Stewart Wieck, Kevin Freeman, and Sandy Petersen, with a cover by Steve Purcell, and was published by Chaosium in 1987 as a 56-page book.
