= Black Sword =

Fantasy tabletop role-playing game supplement

Pursuit of the White Wolf
- Designers: Ken Rolston
- Publishers: Chaosium
- Publication: 1985; 40 years ago
- Genres: Fantasy
- Systems: Basic Role-Playing
- ISBN: 0933635281

Black Sword is a 1985 role-playing game adventure for Stormbringer published by Chaosium.

== Plot summary ==
Black Sword is the second adventure about the heroine Freyda Nikorn's search for Elric of Melniboné, who killed her father.

== Reception ==
Phil Frances reviewed Black Sword for White Dwarf #79, and stated that "This may prove to be the most fascinating Stormbringer adventure you've played yet."

Scott A. Dollinger reviewed Stealer of Souls and Black Sword for Different Worlds magazine and stated that "Although the graphics, maps, and artwork are all first-rate, it would seem that Chaosium needs a better proofreader as several (too many) typos exist in both volumes. They do not impede play but they do detract from an otherwise excellent product. Both Stealer Of Souls and Black Sword are excellent values especially when one considers the number of playing sessions they offer. Keep up the good work Ken."

Michael R. Jarrell reviewed Black Sword in Space Gamer/Fantasy Gamer No. 82. Jarrell commented that "in conclusion, I have to give Black Sword a thumbs up. An exceptional adventure and one that will provide more than one night's play."
