= Atlas of the Young Kingdoms, Vol. 1: The Northern Continent =

1996 Roleplaying game supplement for Elric!

- Designers: Richard Watts
- Publishers: Chaosium
- Publication: 1996; 30 years ago
- Genres: Fantasy
- Systems: Basic Role-Playing
- ISBN: 978-1568820217

Atlas of the Young Kingdoms, Vol. 1: The Northern Continent, is a fantasy sourcebook for the Elric! roleplaying game, written by Richard Watts, and published by Chaosium in 1996. It is based on the Elric of Melniboné books by Michael Moorcock.

== Contents ==
Atlas of the Young Kingdoms, Vol. 1: The Northern Continent is a supplement in which the region from The Sighing Desert to the Isle of the Purple Towns is covered, and it features a broad map and then a detailed gazetteer-style breakdown of districts, domains, and dwellings, including notable personalities and relevant lore for each location.

== Publication history ==
Atlas of the Young Kingdoms, Vol. 1: The Northern Continent was the first in a series of four supplements for Elric! from Chaosium, designed to ease referees into running adventures across the Young Kingdoms without diving through the entire novel series.

== Reception ==
Paul Pettengale reviewed Atlas of the Young Kingdoms, Vol. 1: The Northern Continent for Arcane magazine, rating it a 6 out of 10 overall, and stated that "This tome does a bloody good job at fleshing out the Northern Continents so that any referee can handle any number of adventures in the region. What it doesn't do is read very well. All right, so the author makes a real effort to embellish his copy with all manner of lurid detail and clever turns of phrase, but he seems to do so in such a way that it makes reading this supplement almost painful — it's all so horribly clichéd. This is a shame, because it means that instead of racing through it, eagerly devouring each paragraph as you progress, you end up either having to force yourself, or you waste time laughing over phrases such as, 'Her head lies unnoticed in a far corner, a beatific smile still carved on her lips'. That's a little more detail than I need about a smashed statue, but thanks anyway."

== Reviews ==
- Backstab #4 (as "Le Continent Nord: Atlas des Jeunes Royaumes, Vol. 1")
- Australian Realms #30
- Casus Belli #108 (as "Atlas des Jeunes Royaumes Vol. 1, Le continent nord")
