= Sailing on the Seas of Fate =

1996 Roleplaying game supplement for Elric!

- Publishers: Chaosium
- Publication: 1996; 30 years ago
- Genres: Fantasy
- Systems: Basic Role-Playing

Sailing on the Seas of Fate, is a fantasy sourcebook for the Elric! roleplaying game, published by Chaosium in 1996. It is based on the Elric of Melniboné books by Michael Moorcock.

== Contents ==
Sailing on the Seas of Fate is a supplement in which maritime exploits are addressed, traversing the perilous Young Kingdoms. The supplement equips players and gamemasters with comprehensive rules for seafaring exploration and combat, detailed port descriptions, and a variety of sample ships to crew. It also includes the adventure scenario "The Curse of the Whisperer," which features a ghost ship.

== Reception ==
Paul Pettengale reviewed Sailing on the Seas of Fate for Arcane magazine, rating it a 7 out of 10 overall, and stated that "This is a worthy addition to any Elric! ref's library of supplements. Yes, it's a little dry in places, but the rules additions are clearly presented, and the flavour of sailing upon the seas surrounding the Young Kingdoms is captured well."
