= The Dreaming City =

1961 novelette by Michael Moorcock

- Short story by Michael Moorcock
- Language: English
- Genre: Fantasy

Publication
- Published in: Science Fantasy
- Publication type: Magazine
- Publication date: June 1961
- Publication place: England

"The Dreaming City" is a novelette written by Michael Moorcock, which first appeared in Science Fantasy issue 47, in June 1961. It was the first story to feature the character Elric of Melniboné.

"The Dreaming City" has been reprinted in several collections of Moorcock's Elric stories, including The Stealer of Souls (Spearman, 1963), The Stealer of Souls and Other Stories (Lancer / Mayflower, 1967), The Weird of the White Wolf (DAW, 1977), Elric of Melniboné (Millennium / Orion, 1993), Elric: Song of the Black Sword (White Wolf, 1995), Elric (Gollancz / Orion, 2001), Elric: The Stealer of Souls (Del Rey, 2008), and Elric: Sailor on the Seas of Fate (Gollancz, 2013).

In 1982, Marvel Comics adapted the novelette into a graphic novel written by Roy Thomas and illustrated by P. Craig Russell. In 2021, Titan Comics released a serialized comic book adaptation of The Dreaming City written by Julien Blondel with art by Julien Telo.

This novelette should not be confused with the 1972 novel Elric of Melniboné, which has occasionally been published under the title The Dreaming City by Lancer Books (1972) and Magnum Books (1975) but is actually a distinct story from the 1961 novelette of this name.

== Plot ==
Various warrior leaders await a meeting with Elric of Melniboné, as they plan to raid the powerful city of Imrryr, "The Dreaming City". Following his arrival, he travels alone to Imrryr early, meeting an old friend named Tanglebones who brings him to his lover Cymoril, who has been forcibly put asleep by his treacherous cousin Yyrkoon for some years. Yyrkoon, who illegitimately holds the throne of Melniboné in Elric's place, arrives with soldiers, who Elric defeats with help from the evil god Arioch before fleeing.

Soon after, Elric leads the rest of the warriors and their thousand ships towards Imrryr. After the mercenaries lay waste to Melniboné's outer defenses, Elric guides his fleet through a secret maze of caves to reach the civilization within. As the fighting continues, Elric steals away to meet Cymoril at a hidden spot among the city's towers, but finds Tanglebones dying and Cymoril imprisoned by Yyrkoon, who attacks him with a powerful spell. Elric battles his cousin with the soul-devouring, runesword Stormbringer, Yyrkoon wielding its sister sword Mournblade. Elric fatally wounds Yyrkoon, but the latter grabs Cymoril and throws her onto Stormbringer before Elric can react, resulting in Elric killing her, shortly before Yyrkoon succumbs to his wounds.

Ruined by grief, Elric flees the smoldering ruins of Melniboné with the remainder of his mercenary fleet, whose strength is depleted by the attack and subsequent looting of the city's riches. They are surprised by the fleet of the golden barges of Imrryr and the dragon-riding Dragon Masters. Elric calls upon the black magic passed down to him by his ancestors to aid their escape, but the pursuers move swiftly to overtake the mercenaries. Unable to summon enough strength to save all the ships, Elric saves only himself and his crewmen, speeding away on the winds of elemental forces.

When his ship comes within sight of a harbor, Elric tries to break his bond with Stormbringer by hurling it into the ocean. The magic blade gets stuck in the water as if it were timber, and Elric jumps from the ship to reclaim it, fearing his albino weakness will overcome him without Stormbringer's power. He swims to shore alone, while his crew curses him for being a traitor and coward.
