= Grand Magus =

Swedish heavy metal band

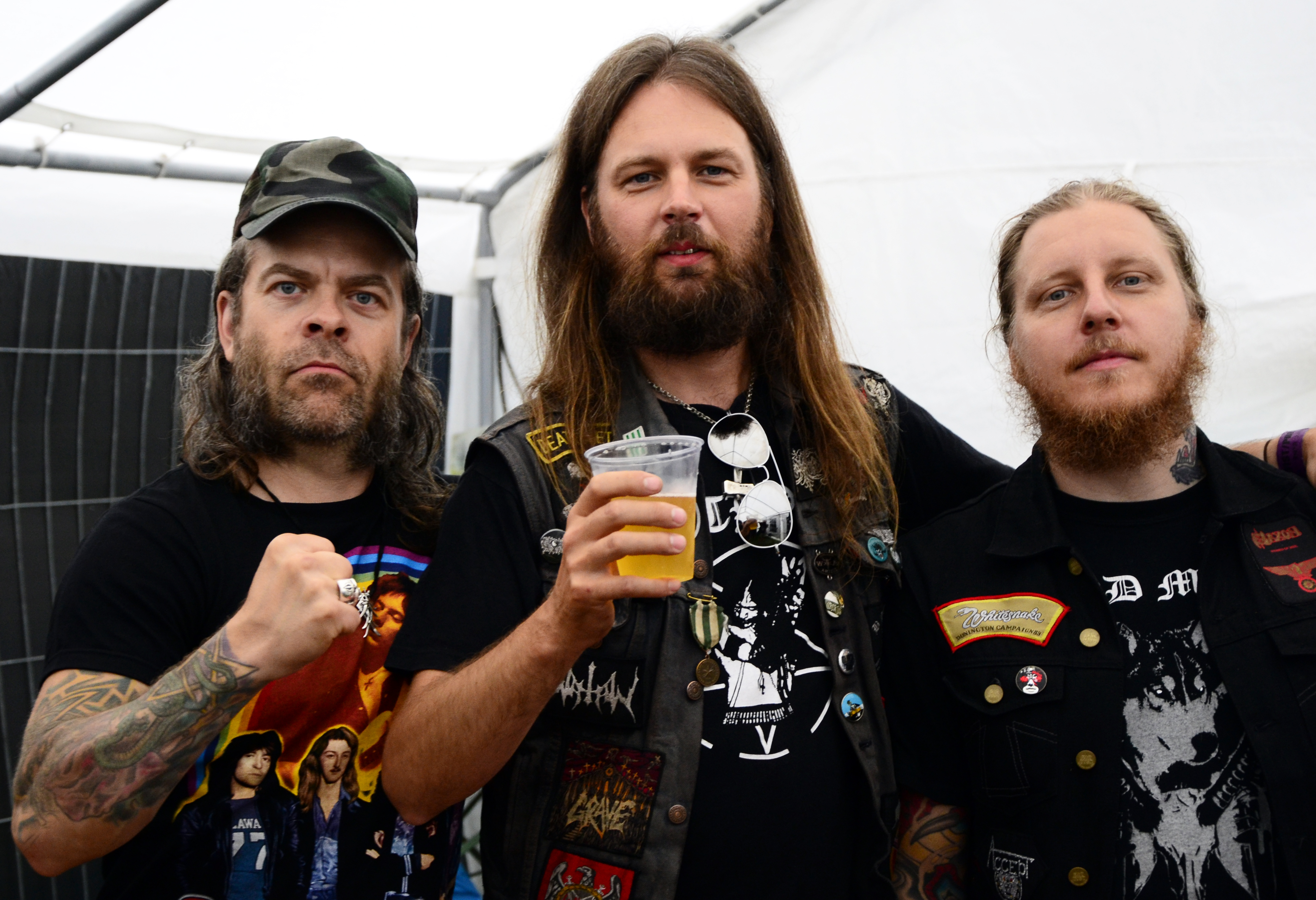
- Grand Magus at Headbangers Open Air 2014

Background information
- Also known as: Smack (1996–1999)
- Origin: Stockholm, Sweden
- Genres: Heavy metal, doom metal, stoner metal
- Years active: 1999–present
- Labels: Rise Above, Roadrunner, Nuclear Blast
- Website: grandmagus.com

Grand Magus are a three-piece heavy metal band from Stockholm, Sweden that draws influence from classic heavy metal bands and elements of doom metal.

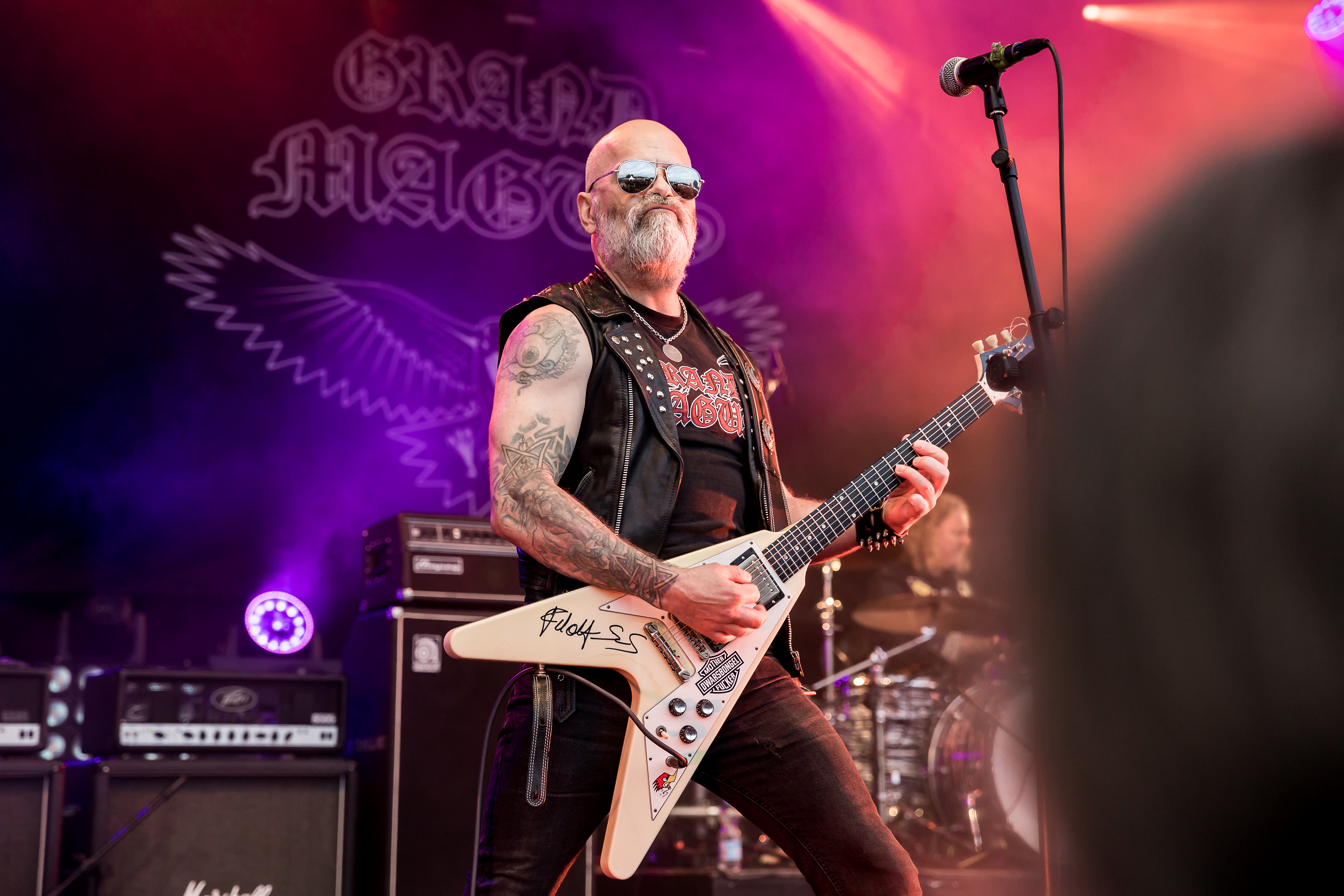
Guitarist and singer Janne „JB“ Christoffersson at Metal Frenzy Open Air 2026

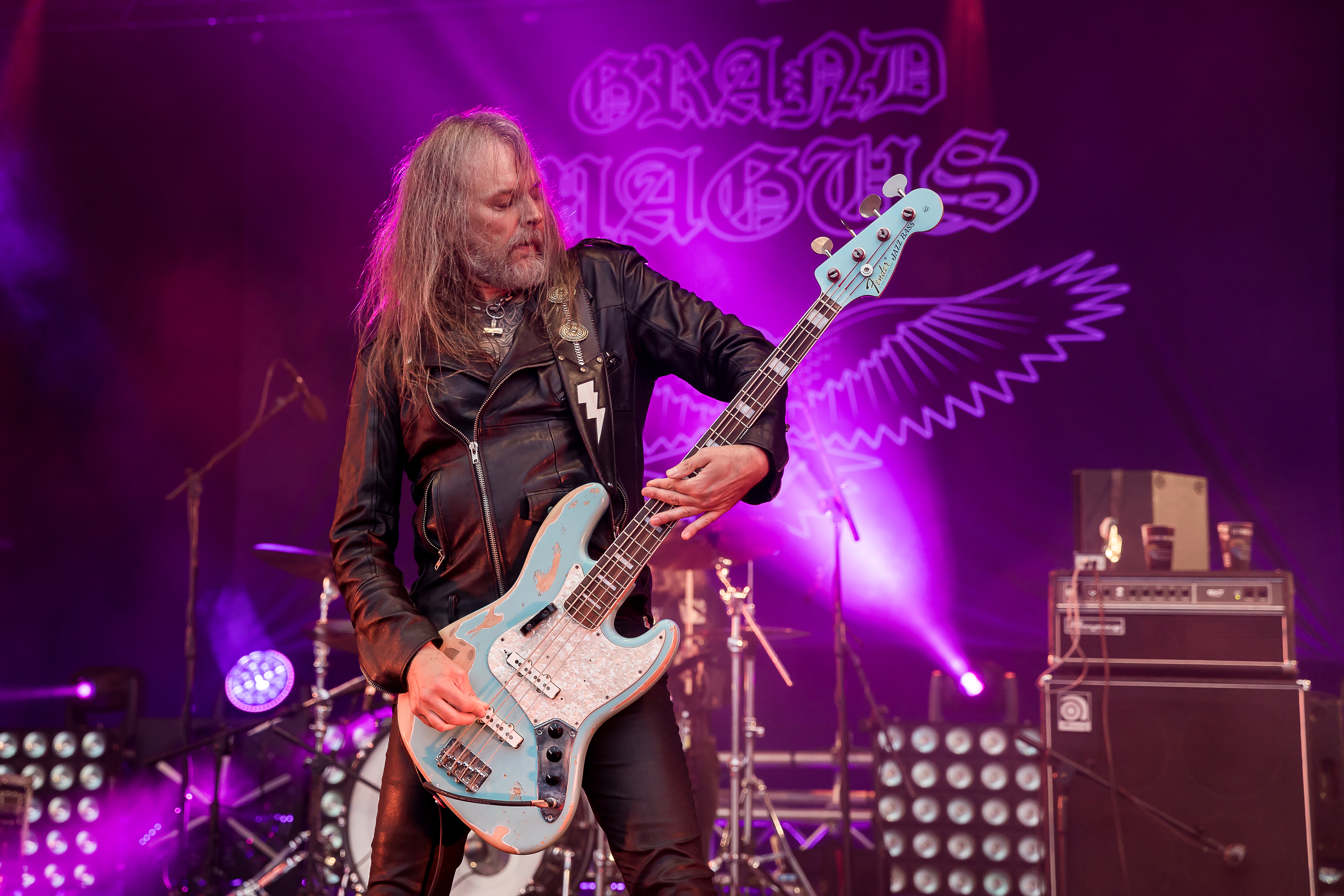
Bassist Mats Fox Hedén Skinner at Metal Frenzy Open Air 2026

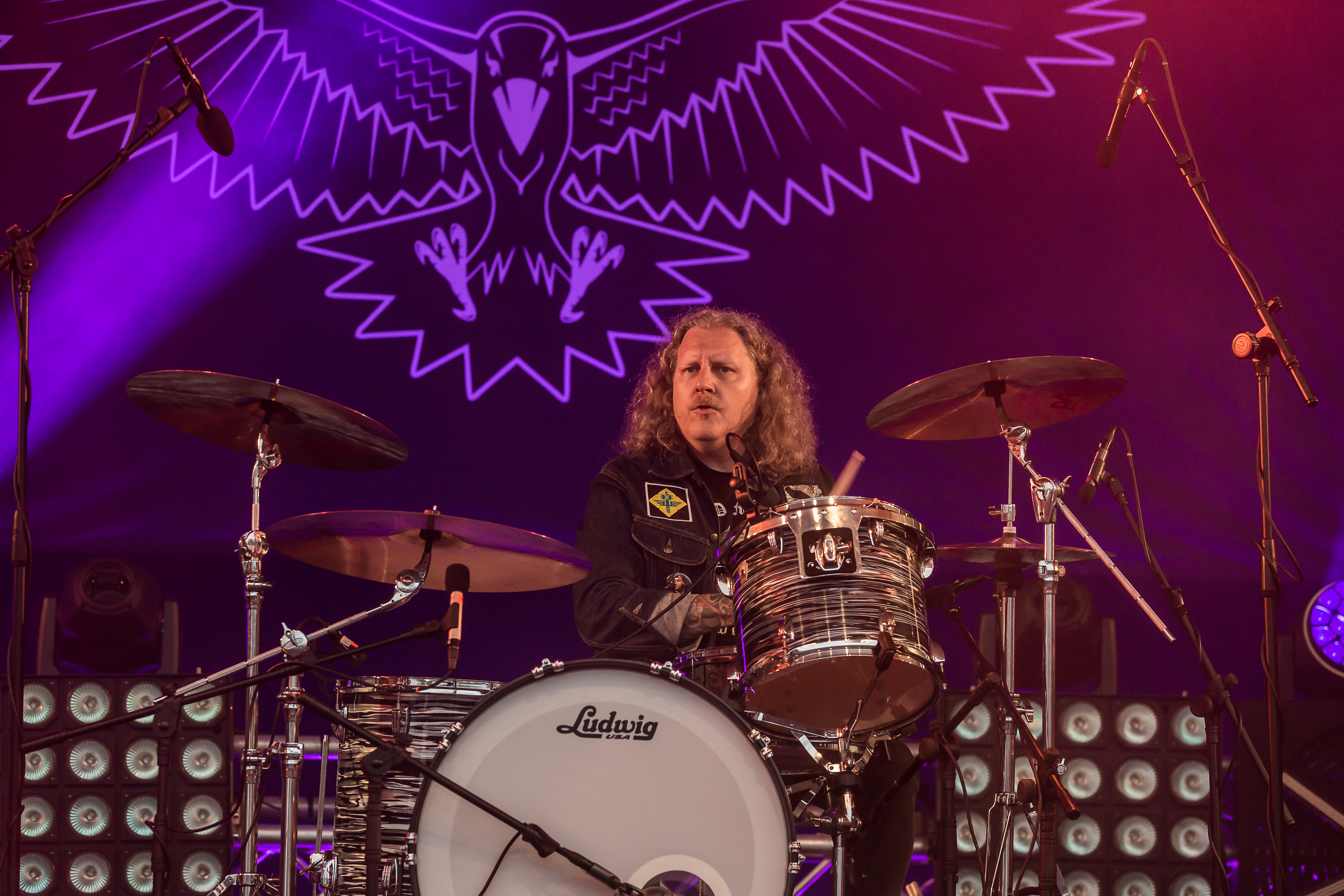
Drummer Ludwig Witt at Metal Frenzy Open Air 2026

== Career ==
The origins of the band trace back to 1996 when they were formed under the name Smack by former Cardinal Fang vocalist Janne "JB" Christoffersson, bassist Mats "Fox" Skinner, and Iggy on drums. Iggy departed in early 1998 and Fredrik "Trisse" Liefvendahl replaced him after responding to an advert for the vacant drummer position. A change in musical direction was also accompanied by a change of name to Grand Magus in 1999. A demo was recorded which received a positive response. This led to an appearance on the Waterdragon Records compilation, Greatest Hits Vol. 1 (2000) and a split 7-inch LP with fellow countrymen Spiritual Beggars (who JB would later join on vocals 2002–2010) on Southern Lord Records.

Their debut album Grand Magus was released on 5 November 2001, through Rise Above Records (who would release the band's first four albums). This album continues to contribute to the band's cult status with doom and heavy metal fans. Two more albums would follow: Monument (25 November 2003) and Wolf's Return (14 June 2005). These would show a progression to a more traditional heavy metal sound but still retain the sound of their groove and stoner roots. Early 2006 saw Magus embark on a European tour supporting Cathedral, along with Electric Wizard, accentuating the band's ability to perform live.

In 2006 Trisse left the band with Sebastian "Seb" Sippola being recruited on drums. The band released their fourth album, Iron Will, on 9 June 2008, which garnered critical acclaim from the rock and music press by achieving first place in Metal Hammer Germany's Soundcheck. This would be the last album to be released by Rise Above Records.

It was announced in December 2009 that Roadrunner Records was to release Grand Magus' fifth album, Hammer of the North, the following summer. Released on 21 June 2010, Hammer of the North became a breakout for the band, triumphing in the Soundchecks of both German Hard Rock and Metal Hammer magazines. The album peaked at number 42 on the German album chart leading to a support slot on the joint tour of major acts Mötorhead and Doro. The eponymous track was regularly positioned as a conclusion to their live sets, due to its ability to elicit crowd participation. The album also yielded two other staple live songs in "Ravens Guide Our Way" and primary set opener "I, the Jury".

April 2012 saw the amicable departure of Seb from the band in order for him to concentrate more on family life. This in turn led to long-time friend Ludwig "Ludde" Witt of Spiritual Beggars being recruited as drummer. Their sixth album, The Hunt, was released via Nuclear Blast on 25 May 2012.

The band's seventh album came in the form of Triumph and Power, released 31 January 2014, which maintained the momentum of its predecessor. The cover artwork was created by artist Anthony Roberts.

Grand Magus' eighth album, Sword Songs was released on 13 May 2016. The songs were recorded during the midwinter months of 2015–16, produced by Nico Elgstrand. On the lead-up to the release, JB commented: "We put all of our sweat, blood and tears into this new album and I think that you can hear that. For me, Sword Songs is the best Grand Magus album ever! The new songs are faster and more aggressive than on Triumph and Power — and we have also included some more extreme and harder stuff. I’m convinced that there are some future classics on the disc!" A cover version of Deep Purple's "Stormbringer" was included as a bonus track on the limited edition CD version, the first cover released in the band's history.

Their ninth album, Wolf God, was released on 19 April 2019. The band had scheduled a European tour for March/April 2022, but due to COVID, they called off the tour and will instead spend the year recording a new album, to be released in 2023 and supported by a different tour that year.

Grand Magus announced on July 25 their 10th studio album set to be released October 18, 2024, it was processed by the first single called Skybound.

== Members ==
=== Current line-up ===
- Janne "JB" Christoffersson – guitar, lead vocals (1999–present)
- Mats "Fox" Skinner – bass, backing vocals (1999–present)
- Ludwig "Ludde" Witt – drums (2012–present)

=== Past members ===
- Fredrik "Trisse" Liefendahl – drums (1999–2006)
- Sebastian "Seb" Sippola – drums (2006–2012)

== Discography ==
=== Studio albums ===
Title	Album details	Peak chart positions							
Title	Album details	SWE	AUT	BEL (WA)	FIN	GER	JPN	SWI	UK
Grand Magus	Released: 5 November 2001; Label: Rise Above Records; Formats: CD, LP, digital download	—	—	—	—	—	—	—	—
Monument	Released: 25 November 2003; Label: Rise Above Records; Formats: CD, LP, digital download	—	—	—	—	—	—	—	—
Wolf's Return	Released: 14 June 2005; Label: Rise Above Records; Formats: CD, LP, digital download	—	—	—	—	—	—	—	—
Iron Will	Released: 9 June 2008; Label: Rise Above Records; Formats: CD, LP, digital download	—	—	—	—	—	231	—	—
Hammer of the North	Released: 21 June 2010; Label: Roadrunner Records; Formats: CD, CD+DVD, LP, digital download	—	73	—	—	42	—	—	—
The Hunt	Released: 25 May 2012; Label: Nuclear Blast; Formats: CD, LP, digital download	49	68	—	—	42	—	76	—
Triumph and Power	Released: 31 January 2014; Label: Nuclear Blast; Formats: CD, LP, digital download	—	36	192	26	21	—	59	129
Sword Songs	Released: 13 May 2016; Label: Nuclear Blast; Formats: CD, LP, digital download	—	59	102	—	30	—	47	—
Wolf God	Released: 19 April 2019; Label: Nuclear Blast; Formats: CD, LP, digital download	—	59	—	—	24	—	34	—
Sunraven	Released: 18 October 2024; Label: Nuclear Blast; Formats: CD, LP, digital download	—	31	—	—	32	—	50	—
"—" denotes a recording that did not chart or was not released in that territory.

=== Music videos ===
Title	Year	Album
"Kingslayer"	2005	Wolf's Return
"Hammer of the North"	2010	Hammer of the North
"At Midnight They'll Get Wise"	2010	Hammer of the North
"Steel Versus Steel"	2014	Triumph and Power
"Freja's Choice"	2017	Sword Songs
"Untamed"	2019	Wolf God
