= Monument (Grand Magus album) =

Studio album by Grand Magus
- Released: November 25, 2003
- Recorded: 2002–2003
- Genres: Heavy metal, doom metal
- Length: 43:45
- Labels: Rise Above; Metal Blade (2010 reissue)

Grand Magus chronology
| Grand Magus (2001) | Monument (2003) | Wolf's Return (2005) |

Professional ratings
Review scores
| Source | Rating |
|---|---|
| Allmusic | 4/5 stars |
| Dead Rhetoric | 7.5/10 |
| Imperiumi | 8/10 |
| Rock Hard | 8/10 |
| Scream Magazine | 4/6 stars |
| Visions | 2/12 |

Monument is the second full-length album by Swedish heavy metal band Grand Magus. It was released on November 25, 2003.

== Track listing ==
1. "Ulvaskall (Vargr)" - 5:45
2. "Summer Solstice" - 3:58
3. "Brotherhood of Sleep" - 5:40
4. "Baptised in Fire" - 8:11
5. "Chooser of the Slain (Valfader)" - 5:19
6. "Food of the Gods" - 4:21
7. "He Who Seeks... Shall Find" - 10:29 (including hidden track "Hrafn")

Japanese bonus track

8. "Stonecircle" - 3:21
