= Stormbringer Companion =

Stormbringer Companion is a role-playing game supplement published by Chaosium in 1983 for Stormbringer.

== Contents ==
Stormbringer Companion is a supplement which contains four adventure scenarios ("Karyzoon's Quest", "Hall of Risk", "Crystal of Daerdaer-darth" and "Eye of the Theocrat") along with two solo adventure scenarios ("Sea Battle at Melnibone" and "Marshes of Mist"), as well as new creatures, characters from the Elric novels, and magic items.

== Publication history ==
Stormbringer Companion was written by John E. Boyle, Scott Clegg, Mark L. Gambler, Ed Gore, Charlie Krank, Sandy Petersen, Steve Perrin, Glenn Rahman, Ken St. Andre, and Lynn Willis, with art by Gene Day and Alan Okamoto, and was published by Chaosium, Inc. in 1983 as an 80-page book.

== Reception ==
Paul Ryan O'Connor reviewed Stormbringer Companion for Different Worlds magazine and stated that "Do I recommend this product? Yes, if you really like Stormbringer, and you're willing to buy something that will be of marginal use to you. If that doesn't sound like a good deal to you, then stay away."

== Reviews ==
- Jeux et Stratégie #48 (as "Le Chant des Enfers")
