= Hammer of the North =

Album by Grand Magus

Studio album by Grand Magus
- Released: 18 June 2010 (Germany); 21 June 2010 (UK); 22 June 2010 (North America)
- Recorded: 2009–2010
- Genre: Heavy metal
- Length: 47:52
- Label: Roadrunner

Grand Magus chronology
Iron Will (2008)	Hammer of the North (2010)	The Hunt (2012)

Hammer of the North is the fifth full-length album by Swedish heavy metal band Grand Magus. The CD was recorded at 301 studios outside of Stockholm, Sweden, and features artwork by Necrolord. The album was released on 23 June 2010 on the record label Roadrunner Records.

== Reception ==
Metal Hammer Germany named Hammer of the North the Album of the Month July.

Professional ratings
Review scores
Source	Rating
Stormbringer	4.5/5 stars
Allmusic	3/5 stars
Metal Hammer Germany	7/7 stars
Soundi	3/5 stars
Metal.de	9/10
Powermetal.de	8/10
Rock Hard	9/10
Visions	6/12

== Track listing ==
1. "I, the Jury" – 4:15
2. "Hammer of the North" – 5:13
3. "Black Sails" – 5:08
4. "Mountains Be My Throne" – 3:46
5. "Northern Star" – 4:19
6. "The Lord of Lies" – 6:14
7. "At Midnight They'll Get Wise" – 3:45
8. "Bond of Blood" – 4:44
9. "Savage Tales" – 4:42
10. "Ravens Guide Our Way" – 5:52

Japanese bonus track

11. "Crown of Iron"

Limited edition bonus DVD

1. "Hammer of the North" video
2. "At Midnight They'll Get Wise" video
3. Behind the Scenes
4. Track by Track
5. Private Talk

== Personnel ==
- Janne "JB" Christoffersson – vocals, guitars
- Mats "Fox" Skinner – bass
- Sebastian Sippola – drums
