= Wolf God =

Studio album by Grand Magus
- Released: April 19, 2019
- Recorded: October–November 2018
- Studios: The Sweetspot Studio, Sweden
- Genre: Heavy metal
- Length: 38:50
- Label: Nuclear Blast
- Producer: Nico Elgstrand

Grand Magus chronology
Sword Songs (2016)	Wolf God (2019)	Sunraven (2024)

Singles from Wolf God
- 1. "Wolf God" Released: February 22, 2019; 2. "A Hall Clad in Gold" Released: April 13, 2019

Professional ratings
Review scores
Source	Rating
Blabbermouth	7/10
Metal Hammer Germany	6/7 stars
Soundi	2/5 stars
Imperiumi	6.5/10
Metal Hammer Italia	78/100
Metal.de	9/10
Powermetal.de	8.5/10
Rock Hard	9/10

Wolf God is the ninth full-length album by Swedish heavy metal band Grand Magus. It was released on April 19, 2019 on Nuclear Blast. Brave Words & Bloody Knuckles honored Wolf God as #20 in the top 30 BravePicks of 2019.

== Track listing ==
1. "Gold and Glory" (intro) - 2:18
2. "Wolf God" - 3:49
3. "A Hall Clad in Gold" - 5:02
4. "Brother of the Storm" - 3:16
5. "Dawn of Fire" - 5:12
6. "Spear Thrower" - 2:55
7. "To Live and to Die in Solitude" - 3:40
8. "Glory to the Brave" - 5:15
9. "He Sent Them All to Hel" - 3:37
10. "Untamed" - 3:45
