= Dragon Lords of Melniboné =

Dragon Lords of Melniboné is a role-playing game published by Chaosium in 2001.

== Description ==
Dragon Lords of Melniboné is a d20 System version of the game Stormbringer.

== Publication history ==
Dragon Lords of Melniboné was published by Chaosium in 2001.

The game features cover art by Frank Brunner.

The adventure Slaves of Fate was published in 2001.

== Reviews ==
- Backstab #30
- Coleção Dragão Brasil
- Campaign Magazine #1 (Aug./Sept., 2001)
