= Sorcerers of Pan Tang =

Sorcerers of Pan Tang is a 1991 role-playing supplement for Stormbringer published by Chaosium.

== Contents ==
Sorcerers of Pan Tang is a supplement in which the island of Pan Tang is detailed.

== Publication history ==
Shannon Appelcline noted how after the fourth edition of Stormbringer was published, "the best books to date for the line were produced first by Keith Herber, then by Mark Morrison. They consisted of thick, well-written books of background, such as Sorcerers of Pan Tang (1991) and colourful adventures, such as Rogue Mistress (1991)."

== Reception ==
Matthew Gabbert reviewed Sorcerers of Pan Tang in White Wolf #31 (May/June, 1992), rating it a 5 out of 5 and stated that "Sorcerers of Pan Tang is well-organized and well-illustrated (thankfully, some of the more graphic descriptions of Pan Tangian recreation are left to the reader's imagination). It successfully presents an atmospheric description of Pan Tang and I strongly recommend it for any Stormbringer campaign."

== Reviews ==
- Anonima Gidierre (Numero 1 - Aprile/Maggio 1995)
- Casus Belli #68
