= Stealer of Souls =

Tabletop role-playing game adventure

- Publishers: Chaosium
- Publication: 1985
- Genres: Role-playing
- Parent games: Stormbringer
- ISBN: 9780933635272

Stealer of Souls is a 1985 role-playing game adventure for Stormbringer published by Chaosium.

== Plot summary ==
Stealer of Souls is the first part of a two-part adventure in which the player characters help avenge the death of the father of a young woman named Freyda.

== Reception ==
Phil Frances reviewed Stealer of Souls for White Dwarf #77, giving it an overall rating of 8 out of 10, and stated that "Stealer Of Souls is the first Stormbringer supplement that I respect (even reading it is enjoyable). Its freshness will revive the palate of many a jaded GM, and it will pose a healthy challenge to an experienced group of characters."

Michael R. Jarrell reviewed Stealer of Souls in Space Gamer/Fantasy Gamer No. 81. Jarrell commented that "The game just doesn't cut the mustard. If you are a SBophile you'll want it. if you are looking for quality versus cash outlay you may be seriously disappointed as I was."

Scott A. Dollinger reviewed Stealer of Souls and Black Sword for Different Worlds magazine and stated that "Although the graphics, maps, and artwork are all first-rate, it would seem that Chaosium needs a better proofreader as several (too many) typos exist in both volumes. They do not impede play but they do detract from an otherwise excellent product. Both Stealer Of Souls and Black Sword are excellent values especially when one considers the number of playing sessions they offer. Keep up the good work Ken."
