= Demon Magic: The Second Stormbringer Companion =

Role-playing game adventure

Demon Magic: The Second Stormbringer Companion is a 1985 role-playing game adventure published by Chaosium for Stormbringer.

== Plot summary ==
Demon Magic: The Second Stormbringer Companion is an adventure in which revised rules for sanity, magical runes, and demonic entities are introduced. Players can also discover fresh magical items and encounter newly designed creatures. The supplement includes several scenarios, notably "Sorcerer's Isle" and "The Velvet Circle".

== Publication history ==
Demon Magic: The Second Stormbringer Companion was written by Larry DiTillio, et al., and published by Chaosium in 1985 as an 80-page book.

== Reviews ==
- Jeux & Stratégie #47 (as "Demons et Magie")
- Imazine (Issue 14 - Summer 1986)
- Casus Belli #29
