= Grand Magus (album) =

Studio album by Grand Magus
- Released: November 2001
- Recorded: 2001
- Genres: Stoner metal, doom metal
- Length: 47:11
- Labels: Rise Above; Metal Blade (2010 reissue)
- Producer: Fred Estby

Grand Magus chronology
Grand Magus (2001)	Monument (2003)

Professional ratings
Review scores
Source	Rating
Allmusic	3/5 stars
Dead Rhetoric	8/10
Rock Hard	6/10
Sputnikmusic	4/5 stars
Visions	7/12

Grand Magus is the debut full-length album by Swedish heavy metal band Grand Magus, released in November 2001. In 2006, the album was re-released with two bonus tracks.

== Track listing ==
1. "Gauntlet" – 3:46
2. "Legion" – 3:46
3. "Never Learned" – 4:48
4. "Black Hound of Vengeance" – 5:00
5. "Coat of Arms" – 3:34
6. "Generator" – 5:32
7. "Wheel of Time" – 5:15
8. "Lodbrok" – 4:07
9. "Black Hole" – 5:00
10. "Mountain of Power" – 5:52

Japanese bonus tracks

11. "Tale of the Unexpected"
12. "Grand Magus"

Remastered 2006 bonus tracks

11. "Tale of the Unexpected"
12. "Grand Magus" (edit)

Remastered 2006 Japanese bonus tracks

11. "Tale of the Unexpected"
12. "Grand Magus" (edit)
13. "Gauntlet" (live)
