= The Shattered Isle =

Science fantasy tabletop role-playing game supplement

Rebels Against the Mutant Master
- Cover illustration by Susan Seddon Boulet.
- Designers: Kerie Campbell-Robson; Steve Perrin; Sandy Petersen
- Publishers: Chaosium
- Publication: 1987; 38 years ago
- Genres: Science fantasy
- Systems: Basic Role-Playing

The Shattered Isle: Rebels Against the Mutant Master is a science fantasy tabletop role-playing game supplement designed by Kerie Campbell-Robson, Steve Perrin, and Sandy Petersen and published by Chaosium in 1987. Designed to be used with Hawkmoon or Stormbringer, it provides new rules, background, and adventures for a campaign set in Eire.

== Plot summary ==
The Shattered Isle is a supplement of rules concerning aerial combat and also for vehicles such as tanks, armored personnel carriers, and helicopters, and additionally includes six adventure scenarios.

== Publication history ==
The Shattered Isle was written by Steve Perrin, Sandy Petersen, and Kerie Campbell-Robson and was published by Chaosium in 1987 as a 64-page book.

== Reception ==
Peter Green reviewed The Shattered Isle for White Dwarf #90 and stated that "Both adventures successfully capture the flavour of the Hawkmoon novels. They are very Moorcockian, containing those weird and baroque elements which make Michael Moorcock such a distinctive writer. Chaosium have done a good job with the Eternal Champion line. It should appeal to both Hawkmoon and Stormbringer players."

Stewart Wieck reviewed the product in the December 1986 to January 1987 issue of White Wolf. He stated that it was "very nicely done and, if you have Hawkmoon, is a must". He rated it overall at 9 points out of 10.
