= Les Mers du Destin =

Les Mers du Destin is a 1998 role-playing game supplement published by Oriflam for Elric!.

== Contents ==
Les Mers du Destin is a supplement in which seafaring is explored through naval rules, fleet descriptions, ships and sea creatures, the interdimensional "Navire Noir," optional mechanics, and three full scenarios, concluding with a captain's travel journal.

== Reviews ==
- Casus Belli #117
- Backstab #12
