= Slaves of Fate =

Slaves of Fate is a 2001 role-playing game adventure published by Chaosium for Dragon Lords of Melniboné.

== Plot summary ==
Slaves of Fate is an adventure in which beginning player characters are introduced to the game system.

== Reviews ==
- Pyramid
- Backstab (as "Esclave du Destin")
- Campaign Magazine (Issue 3 - May/Jun 2002)
