= Sea Kings of the Purple Towns =

Sea Kings of the Purple Towns is a 1992 role-playing supplement for Stormbringer published by Chaosium.

== Contents ==
Sea Kings of the Purple Towns is a supplement in which the Isle of the Purple Towns is detailed.

== Reception ==
Matthew Gabbert reviewed Sea Kings of the Purple Towns in White Wolf #37 (July/Aug., 1993), rating it a 3 out of 5 and stated that "Sea Kings of the Purple Towns is a good sourcebook and a fun set of adventures. Whether you want to focus your Stormbringer campaign on the Isle, use it as a home base or just have your players visit occasionally, it's definitely worth a donation to Goldar."

== Reviews ==
- Journeys: Journal of Multidimensional Roleplaying #5 (1993)
- Casus Belli (Issue 72 - Nov 1992)
