= Iron Will (album) =

Studio album by Grand Magus
- Released: 9 June 2008 (UK)
- Recorded: 2007–2008
- Genre: Heavy metal
- Length: 41:19
- Labels: Rise Above, Candlelight

Grand Magus chronology
Wolf's Return (2005)	Iron Will (2008)	Hammer of the North (2010)

Professional ratings
Review scores
Source	Rating
AllMusic	2.5/5 stars
Metal Hammer Germany	7/7 stars
Scream Magazine	5/6 stars
Soundi	4/5 stars
Imperiumi	9.5/10
Metal.de	3/10
Powermetal.de	6.5/10
Rock Hard	8/10

Iron Will is the fourth full-length album by Swedish heavy metal band Grand Magus. The album was recorded in Stockholm, Sweden. It was released in Europe on 9 June 2008, on the record label Rise Above Records, and in the United States on 24 June 2008, through Candlelight Records.

== Track listing ==
1. "Like the Oar Strikes the Water" – 3:13
2. "Fear Is the Key" – 3:31
3. "Hövding" – 0:39
4. "Iron Will" – 5:01
5. "Silver into Steel" – 4:15
6. "The Shadow Knows" – 5:35
7. "Self Deceiver" – 4:49
8. "Beyond Good and Evil" – 5:15
9. "I Am the North" – 9:03
- The song "I Am the North" ends at 5:15. An untitled hidden track starts at 8:05.

Japanese edition bonus track

10. "Mountain of Power" (demo)

== Personnel ==
- Janne "JB" Christoffersson – vocals, guitars
- Mats "Fox" Skinner – bass
- Sebastian "Seb" Sippola – drums
