= Stormbringer (album) =

Studio album by Deep Purple
- Released: 8 November 1974
- Recorded: August–September 1974
- Studios: Musicland, Munich, Germany; Record Plant, Los Angeles, California
- Genres: Hard rock; funk rock; blues rock
- Length: 36:31
- Labels: Purple; Warner Bros. (US & Canada)
- Producers: Martin Birch & Deep Purple

Deep Purple chronology
Burn (1974)	Stormbringer (1974)	Come Taste the Band (1975)

Singles from Stormbringer
- 1. "You Can't Do It Right" Released: November 1974 (US); 2. "Lady Double Dealer" Released: December 1974 (Japan); 3. "Stormbringer" Released: January 1975

Ritchie Blackmore chronology
Burn (1974)	Stormbringer (1974)	Ritchie Blackmore's Rainbow (1975)

Stormbringer is the ninth studio album by English rock band Deep Purple, released on 8 November 1974. It was the band's second and last studio album to feature the Mk III lineup including vocalist David Coverdale and bassist/vocalist Glenn Hughes. It was also the last Deep Purple album to feature guitarist Ritchie Blackmore before his 1975 departure from the group. He reunited with Deep Purple in 1984 for Perfect Strangers.

== Album cover and title ==
The cover image of Stormbringer is based on a photo. On 8 July 1927 a tornado near the town of Jasper, Minnesota, was photographed by Lucille Handberg. Her photograph has become a classic image, and was used and edited for the album's cover. The same photograph was used for Miles Davis' album Bitches Brew in 1970 and Siouxsie and the Banshees' album Tinderbox in 1986.

Stormbringer is the title of the second Elric of Melniboné novel by Michael Moorcock. It is the name of a magical sword, described in many novels and comics by Moorcock and others that enjoyed enormous success in the 1960s and 1970s. David Coverdale has denied knowledge of this until shortly after recording the album. In an interview with Charles Shaar Murray in the New Musical Express, he claimed that the name was from mythology. A few years later, Moorcock collaborated with Blue Öyster Cult to write "Black Blade", a song that actually was about the sword Stormbringer.

According to Glenn Hughes, the slurred gibberish that is spoken by Coverdale at the beginning of the title track just prior to the first verse is the same backwards dialogue that Linda Blair's character utters in the film The Exorcist, when she is questioned by the priest.

== Release and reception ==
Professional ratings
Review scores
Source	Rating
AllMusic	2/5 stars
Blogcritics	(favourable)
Džuboks	(favourable)
Record Collector	4/5 stars
Rolling Stone	(mixed)

In a retrospective review, Alex Henderson of AllMusic writes that "Stormbringer falls short of the excellence of Machine Head and Who Do We Think We Are, but nonetheless boasts some definite classics – including the fiery 'Lady Double Dealer,' the ominous title song (a goth metal treasure), the sweaty 'High Ball Shooter,' and the melancholy ballad 'Soldier of Fortune.'"

Guitarist Ritchie Blackmore left Deep Purple following Stormbringer and its subsequent tour, publicly citing his dislike for the funky direction the band was taking. Glenn Hughes nevertheless praises the album and Blackmore's contributions: "People who listen to Stormbringer, please listen...Ritchie Blackmore is damn funky, whether he likes it or not. He played wonderfully on the album."

=== Reissues ===
In 1990, the album was remastered and re-released in the US by Metal Blade Records, with distribution by Warner Bros.

The Friday Music label released a version in the United States on 31 July 2007 (along with Made in Europe and Come Taste the Band). It is unclear which tapes were used as a source for this release, but the label's website claims that the album was digitally remastered (but not expanded).

Additionally EMI (Deep Purple's label for much of the world outside the US) worked with Glenn Hughes on a remastered, expanded version of the album (much like the Burn rerelease) which included bonus remixes and alternative takes.

35th Anniversary Edition

On 23 February 2009 the 35th Anniversary Edition of Stormbringer was released for the European/international market only. The release was expanded into a limited edition two-disc set: the first disc contained the full remastered album along with the new remixes, and the second disc was a DVD containing the quadraphonic mix in 5.1 audio as originally released in the USA on Quad reel back in 1974. After a limited run of the CD/DVD edition, the album became available in a single CD edition. A limited double gatefold vinyl edition was also released.

== Track listing ==
All lead vocals sung by David Coverdale and Glenn Hughes, except "Holy Man" sung by Hughes and "Soldier of Fortune" by Coverdale.

Side one
No.	Title	Writer(s)	Length
1.	"Stormbringer"	Ritchie Blackmore, Coverdale	4:03
2.	"Love Don't Mean a Thing"	Blackmore, Coverdale, Hughes, Jon Lord, Ian Paice	4:23
3.	"Holy Man"	Coverdale, Hughes, Lord	4:28
4.	"Hold On"	Coverdale, Hughes, Lord, Paice	5:05

Side two
No.	Title	Writer(s)	Length
1.	"Lady Double Dealer"	Blackmore, Coverdale	3:19
2.	"You Can't Do It Right (With the One You Love)"	Blackmore, Coverdale, Hughes	3:24
3.	"High Ball Shooter"	Blackmore, Coverdale, Hughes, Lord, Paice	4:26
4.	"The Gypsy"	Blackmore, Coverdale, Hughes, Lord, Paice	4:05
5.	"Soldier of Fortune"	Blackmore, Coverdale	3:14

35th Anniversary Edition – disc one bonus tracks
No.	Title	Length
10.	"Holy Man" (remix)	4:32
11.	"You Can't Do It Right" (remix)	3:27
12.	"Love Don't Mean a Thing" (remix)	5:07
13.	"Hold On" (remix)	5:11
14.	"High Ball Shooter" (instrumental)	4:30

== Personnel ==
Deep Purple

- Ritchie Blackmore – guitars
- David Coverdale – vocals
- Glenn Hughes – bass guitar, vocals
- Jon Lord – organ, keyboards, electric piano
- Ian Paice – drums, percussion

Production

- Produced by Deep Purple and Martin Birch
- Recorded at Musicland Studios, Munich in August 1974
- Engineered by Martin Birch, assisted by Reinhold Mack and Hans Menzel
- Additional recording and mixing by Martin Birch and Ian Paice, assisted by Gary Webb and Garry Ladinsky at The Record Plant, Los Angeles during September 1974
- Mastered at Kendun Recorders, Burbank, California
- 35th Anniversary Edition digital mastering and remastering by Peter Mew at Abbey Road Studios, London
- Remixes for the "35th Anniversary Edition" mixed by Glenn Hughes with Peter Mew at Abbey Road Studios, London, 3 November 2006
- "High Ball Shooter" (instrumental) mixed by Gary Massey at Abbey Road Studios, London, April 2002
- Original Quad mix by Gary Ladinsky at The Record Plant, October 1974
- Reformatted for 5.1 surround sound by Peter Mew at Abbey Road Studios, London, February 2008

== Charts ==
=== Weekly charts ===
Weekly chart performance for Stormbringer
Chart (1974–1975)	Peak position
Australian Albums (Kent Music Report)	8
Austrian Albums (Ö3 Austria)	4
Canada Top Albums/CDs (RPM)	7
Danish Albums (Hitlisten)	6
Finnish Albums (The Official Finnish Charts)	6
French Albums (SNEP)	5
German Albums (Offizielle Top 100)	10
Italian Albums (Musica e Dischi)	5
Japanese Albums (Oricon)	22
New Zealand Albums (RMNZ)	18
Norwegian Albums (VG-lista)	2
Spanish Albums (AFYVE)	6
UK Albums (Official Charts)	6
US Billboard 200	20

Chart (2009)	Peak position
Scottish Albums (Official Charts)	92
UK Rock & Metal Albums (Official Charts)	2

=== Year-end charts ===
Year-end chart performance for Stormbringer
Chart (1975)	Position
German Albums (Offizielle Top 100)	31

== Certifications ==
Certifications for Stormbringer
Region	Certification	Certified units/sales
France (SNEP)	Gold	100,000^{*}
Sweden (GLF)	Gold	50,000^{^}
United Kingdom (BPI)	Silver	60,000^{^}
United States (RIAA)	Gold	500,000^{^}
^{*} Sales figures based on certification alone.^{^} Shipments figures based on certification alone.

== Accolades ==
Accolades for Stormbringer
Publication	Country	Accolade	Year	Rank
Classic Rock	United Kingdom	"100 Greatest British Rock Album Ever"	2006	62
