= The Hunt (Grand Magus album) =

Studio album by Grand Magus
- Released: 25 May 2012
- Recorded: 2011–2012
- Studios: Studio Wahnsinn, Stockholm, Sweden
- Genre: Heavy metal
- Length: 44:29
- Label: Nuclear Blast
- Producer: Nico Elgstrand

Grand Magus chronology
Hammer of the North (2010)	The Hunt (2012)	Triumph and Power (2014)

Professional ratings
Review scores
Source	Rating
Allmusic	4/5 stars
Sputnikmusic	4/5 stars
Metal Hammer Germany	6/7 stars
Soundi	2/5 stars
Imperiumi	8/10
Metal.de	8/10
Metal Storm	7.8/10
Powermetal.de	7.5/10
Rock Hard	8/10
Visions	6/12

The Hunt is the sixth full-length album by Swedish heavy metal band Grand Magus. It was released on 25 May 2012 on Nuclear Blast. This is their first album with new drummer Ludwig "Ludde" Witt.

== Track listing ==
1. "Starlight Slaughter" – 4:19
2. "Sword of the Ocean" – 4:28
3. "Valhalla Rising" – 4:52
4. "Storm King" – 4:20
5. "Silver Moon" – 4:43
6. "The Hunt" – 5:27
7. "Son of the Last Breath (I. Nattfödd/II. Vedergällning)" – 6:49
8. "Iron Hand" – 3:44
9. "Draksådd" – 5:48
10. "Silver Moon" (demo version) – 4:37 (bonus track)
11. "Storm King" (demo version) – 3:58 (bonus track)
12. "Sword of the Ocean" (demo version) – 4:15 (bonus track)

== Personnel ==
- Janne "JB" Christoffersson – vocals, guitars
- Mats "Fox" Skinner – bass
- Ludwig "Ludde" Witt – drums
