= Sword Songs =

Studio album by Grand Magus
- Released: 13 May 2016
- Recorded: 2015–2016
- Studios: Top Floor Studios in Helsinki, Finland; Studio Supa in Stockholm, Sweden
- Genre: Heavy metal
- Length: 34:45; 43:25 (with bonus tracks)
- Label: Nuclear Blast
- Producer: Nico Elgstrand

Grand Magus chronology
| Triumph and Power (2014) | Sword Songs (2016) | Wolf God (2019) |

Singles from Sword Songs
- 1. "Varangian" Released: 24 March 2016; 2. "Forged in Iron – Crowned in Steel" Released: 28 April 2016; 3. "Freja's Choice" Released: 23 March 2017

Professional ratings
Review scores
| Source | Rating |
|---|---|
| Blabbermouth.net | 8/10 |
| Metal Storm | 7.5/10 |
| Imperiumi | 8.5/10 |
| Metal.de | 9/10 |
| Metal Hammer Germany | 6/7 stars |
| Powermetal.de | 7/10 |
| Rock Hard | 8.5/10 |

Sword Songs is the eighth full-length album by Swedish heavy metal band Grand Magus. It was released on 13 May 2016 on Nuclear Blast.

== Track listing ==
1. "Freja's Choice" – 4:00
2. "Varangian" – 3:40
3. "Forged in Iron – Crowned in Steel" – 5:38
4. "Born for Battle (Black Dog of Brocéliande)" – 3:41
5. "Master of the Land" – 3:51
6. "Last One to Fall" – 4:01
7. "Frost and Fire" – 3:16
8. "Hugr" (instrumental) – 2:07
9. "Every Day There's a Battle to Fight" – 4:31
10. "In for the Kill" – 3:37 (bonus track)
11. "Stormbringer" (Deep Purple cover) – 5:03 (bonus track)

== Personnel ==
- Janne "JB" Christoffersson – guitars, vocals
- Mats "Fox" Skinner – bass
- Ludwig "Ludde" Witt – drums
