= Wolf's Return =

Studio album by Grand Magus
- Released: 14 June 2005
- Genre: Heavy metal
- Length: 38:20
- Labels: Rise Above, Candlelight; Metal Blade (2012 reissue)

Grand Magus chronology
Monument (2003)	Wolf's Return (2005)	Iron Will (2008)

Professional ratings
Review scores
Source	Rating
AllMusic	3.5/5 stars
Desibeli.net	4.5/5 stars
Imperiumi	7.5/10
Metal.de	9/10
Popmatters	7/10
Rock Hard	7/10
Scream Magazine	5/6 stars

Wolf's Return is the third full-length album by Swedish heavy metal band Grand Magus. It was released in Europe and in the United States on 14 June 2005.

== Track listing ==
1. "Kingslayer" – 4:10
2. "Nine" – 3:27
3. "Blodörn" – 1:11
4. "Wolf's Return" – 4:51
5. "Blood Oath" – 4:41
6. "Järnbörd" – 1:09
7. "Repay in Kind" – 5:11
8. "Hämnd" – 1:34
9. "Ashes" – 4:37
10. "Light Hater" – 4:53
11. "Wolf's Return Part II" – 2:30

Japanese edition bonus track

12. "Brotherhood of Sleep" (Live)

== Personnel ==
- Janne "JB" Christoffersson – vocals, guitars
- Mats "Fox" Skinner – bass
- Fredrik "Trisse" Liefendahl – drums
