= The Octagon of Chaos =

The Octagon of Chaos is a 1986 role-playing game adventure published by Theatre of the Mind Enterprises for Stormbringer.

== Plot summary ==
The Octagon of Chaos is an adventure in which 4 to 6 players each control two mid-level player characters from the Young Kingdoms. Their goal is to plunder the treasures hidden within an abandoned Melnibonéan tower complex. However, a rival party from the sinister island of Pan Tang arrives with the same intentions.

== Publication history ==
The Octagon of Chaos was written by Tony Fiorito, with a cover by Joe O'Niel and illustrations by Rick Barber and published by T.O.M.E. (Theatre of the Mind Enterprises) in 1986 as a 56-page book.

== Reviews ==
- Jeux & Stratégie #51 (as "L'Octogone du Chaos")
