= Melniboné (Elric!) =

1993 Roleplaying game supplement for Elric!

Dragon Isle and Dreaming city
- Designers: Richard Watts; Geoff Gillan; Penelope Love; Mark Morrison
- Publishers: Chaosium
- Publication: 1993; 33 years ago
- Genres: Fantasy
- Systems: Basic Role-Playing

Melniboné, Dragon Isle and Dreaming City, is a fantasy sourcebook for the Elric! roleplaying game, written by Richard Watts, Geoff Gillan, Penelope Love and Mark Morrison, and published by Chaosium in 1993. It is based on the Elric of Melniboné books by Michael Moorcock.

== Contents ==
Melniboné is a supplement in which Melniboné is detailed as a setting.

== Reception ==
Matthew Gabbert reviewed Melniboné in White Wolf Inphobia #54 (April, 1995), rating it a 4 out of 5 and stated that "Since most Elric! campaigns are flexible about travel, there should be little problem with incorporating Melniboné into an ongoing storyline. My only qualm with this otherwise fine supplement is that it's overpriced - it costs more than the Elric! rules!"

== Reviews ==
- Casus Belli #79
- Australian Realms #15
- Free INT (Issue 7 - May 1994)
