= Lord Tyger =

1970 novel by Philip José Farmer

First edition (publ. Doubleday)

Lord Tyger is an American novel by Philip José Farmer. Originally released in 1970, the book is a metafictional pastiche of one of Farmer's favorite subjects, Edgar Rice Burroughs' Tarzan.

== Plot summary ==
Ras Tyger has lived in the jungle for as long as he can remember. Raised by apes, he lives an idyllic existence as the lord of the jungle, gleefully hunting prey and feeding his prodigious sexual appetite with various female denizens of his jungle.

Eventually, however, Tyger begins to suspect that all is not as it seems. He sees strange giant birds, black and without movement aside from their spinning wings atop their heads. He sees other apes raising their young and ponders why his childhood was so different. Always receiving more questions than answers, the more Tyger explores his universe, the more it begins to deconstruct before his very eyes.

Ultimately, Tyger discovers that his entire life is a fraud, a construct. A crazed millionaire named Boygur has, in an effort to reproduce the Tarzan novels he loved as a child, purchased a young English nobleman (Tyger) and created a complex series of jungle environs for him to live within. He hires two dwarfs to act as his ape parents, and has two huge black helicopters (Tyger's "giant birds") patrol the area to keep outsiders out, and insiders in.

Ultimately, neither Tyger nor Boygur get what they desire. Tyger cannot handle the harshness of his newfound reality, and Boygur is shocked and appalled when the jungle superman he has raised is far from innocent. At the end of the book, Boygur sadly notes that "things went their own way."

== Reaction and analysis ==
Critics' reaction to the book varied wildly. While many admired the creativity of Farmer's premise and his exploration and rethinking of Burroughs' Tarzan mythos, others condemned the book for its sometimes graphic content. Algis Budrys declared Lord Tyger to be "an entertaining, rich, inventive adventure novel in the best sense, with its most lyrical passages far surpassing any effect Edgar Rice Burroughs was ever able to achieve."

Farmer's handling of Tarzan has been met with different reactions. Some said that he succeeded in creating a "real" Tarzan, or that it even surpassed Burroughs' original work.

Even those who did not enjoy the plot or revisionism of the book still found Farmer's writing to be of high quality.

== Publishing history ==
Lord Tyger was first released by Doubleday in 1970, as a hardcover. This edition featured cover art by Seymour Chwast. It was reprinted as a paperback by Signet with cover art by Bob Pepper, in 1972. It was first released in the United Kingdom as a Panther paperback in 1974, featuring cover art by Richard Clifton-Dey. Another Signet edition, this time in 1981, was a "Signet Double Science Fiction" paired with Farmer's earlier novel Flesh. The Richard Clifton-Dey artwork was re-used for the latest edition, a 1985 Granada paperback.

The French language edition was entitled Le Tigre Africain, roughly "The African Tiger".
