= Hawkmoon (role-playing game) =

Science fantasy tabletop role-playing game

Science & Sorcery in Earth's Far Future
- Illustration by Frank Brunner.
- Designers: Kerie Campbell-Robson
- Publishers: Chaosium
- Publication: 1986; 39 years ago
- Genres: Science fantasy
- Systems: Basic Role-Playing
- ISBN: 0-933635-31-1

Hawkmoon is a science fantasy tabletop role-playing game designed by Kerie Campbell-Robson and published by Chaosium in 1986.

== Description ==
Hawkmoon is a science fantasy game based on Michael Moorcock's The History of the Runestaff novels. It is linked to the Stormbringer game in the "Eternal Champion" series. The rules are a variation of the standard Chaosium skill-based system from Basic Role-Playing. The "Players Book" (52 pages) describes Europe in the "Tragic Millennium," an age in which a loathsome magico-technic empire gradually brings the world under its control. The book also covers character creation, skills, weapons, and combat. The "Science Book" (16 pages) covers the history of the Tragic Millennium, technological items, and mutations. The "Gamemaster Book" (48 pages) explains how to run the game and also includes monsters and NPCs, treasures, statistics for the main characters from the novels, sample character record sheets, and two introductory miniscenarios.

== Publication history ==
Hawkmoon was designed by Kerie Campbell-Robson with a cover by Frank Brunner and was published in 1986 by Chaosium as a boxed set that included a 52-page book, a 48-page book, a 16-page book, a map, a pamphlet, and dice.

One adventure was published for this edition, The Shattered Isle.

The Hawkmoon game became popular in France, where it was translated into French for the first time in 1988, and a third French edition was published in 2009.

== Reception ==
Stewart Wieck reviewed the product in the December 1986 to January 1987 issue of White Wolf. He rated it 4 points of 10 for Contents, 6 points for Complexity, 7 points for Appearance, and 8 points for both Components and Playability. He rated it overall at 6 points of 10. Peter Green reviewed Hawkmoon for White Dwarf #86 saying, "There are a few problems with it, but fans of Michael Moorcock will be more than pleased to defend the Kamarg, or to battle in Londra to overthrow the Dark Empire for all time, or at least until other 'alternate realities' affect the outcome."

In his 1990 book The Complete Guide to Role-Playing Games, game critic Rick Swan was ambivalent about this game, commenting, "Though the game is well-written and easy to learn — perhaps the simplest of all the Chaosium games — it's not particularly exciting. There's no magic to speak of, and the monsters and other potential adversaries aren't very threatening." Swan concluded by giving the game a rating of 2.5 out of 4, saying, "Moorcock fans might enjoy this, but the world of Hawkmoon — at least as presented here — probably lacks the depth to sustain the interest of most players."
