= Triumph and Power =

Studio album by Grand Magus
- Released: 31 January 2014
- Genre: Heavy metal
- Length: 42:26
- Label: Nuclear Blast
- Producer: Nico Elgstrand

Grand Magus chronology
The Hunt (2012)	Triumph and Power (2014)	Sword Songs (2016)

Professional ratings
Review scores
Source	Rating
About.com	3.5/5 stars
Blabbermouth.net	8.5/10
Brave Words & Bloody Knuckles	8/10
Metal.de	8/10
MetalSucks	4/5 stars
Popmatters	8/10
Plattentests.de	7/10
Powermetal.de	9.5/10
Rock Hard	9/10
Sputnikmusic	4/5 stars

Triumph and Power is the seventh full-length album by Swedish heavy metal band Grand Magus. It was released on 31 January 2014 on Nuclear Blast. Vocalist JB Christofferson described the album as "really powerful, majestic and less 'hard rocky' than" previous album, The Hunt (2012). Christofferson described Triumph and Power as "really the essence of this band".

== Recording ==
Grand Magus continued its concern with obtaining a strong drum sound, which Christofferson identified as a reaction against the strong focus on the guitar sound. He noted that in heavy metal the drums are extremely important, maybe more important than many people realize. There has been a tendency in "modern" metal to focus too much on a fat guitar sound, resulting in really weak sounding or fake sounding drums. In my experience, the fat guitar sound is a result of the combination of drums and bass guitar, rather than using all space/frequencies for the guitars. You have to have a really solid foundation to make things explode, hence the focus on the drums.

== Track listing ==
1. "On Hooves of Gold" – 5:24
2. "Steel versus Steel" – 5:19
3. "Fight" – 4:06
4. "Triumph and Power" – 4:52
5. "Dominator" – 4:20
6. "Arv" – 1:57
7. "Holmgång" – 3:38
8. "The Naked and the Dead" – 3:02
9. "Ymer" – 2:54
10. "The Hammer Will Bite" – 6:54
11. "Blackmoon" – 3:45 (digipak bonus track)

== Personnel ==
- Janne "JB" Christoffersson – vocals, guitars
- Mats "Fox" Skinner – bass
- Ludwig "Ludde" Witt – drums
