= Elric of Melniboné (novel) =

1972 fantasy novel by Michael Moorcock

- First UK edition
- Author: Michael Moorcock
- Cover artist: Laurence Cutting
- Language: English
- Genre: Fantasy
- Published: 1972 (Hutchinson)
- Publication place: United Kingdom
- Media type: Print (hardcover, paperback)
- Pages: 191 pp
- ISBN: 0-09-112100-0

Elric of Melniboné is a 1972 fantasy novel by Michael Moorcock. It is the first original full-length novel to feature Elric, the last emperor of the stagnating island civilisation of Melniboné, who wields the cursed, soul-drinking sword Stormbringer.

== Plot ==
After the death of his father, Elric reigns as the 428th sorcerer-king of the island kingdom of Melniboné, known as the Dragon Isle. Elric believes that, after millennia of dominating their world, the Melnibonéans have become decadent, and sees that their empire is crumbling and is now a shadow of its former glory. Only the capital city, Imrryr, has not reverted to wilderness. Melnibonéans are a haughty, arrogant race who live only for pleasure and novelty. Slavery and torture are common practices.

Elric, a sickly albino, requires potions and magic to sustain his health. He has spent much of his youth on Dreaming Couches, which allowed him to learn from virtual years worth of experiences in a short time. Elric is in love with his cousin, Cymoril. Elric confides to Cymoril that he would like to bring morality and fairness to Melniboné and that he is not interested in cruelty or power, as were his ancestors.

Yyrkoon, Cymoril's brother, also desires Cymoril and plots to take the throne of Melniboné for himself. When a fleet of invaders from the Young Kingdoms attacks Imrryr, Elric leads the Melnibonéan war barges to destroy them. During the battle, Yyrkoon takes advantage of Elric's weakened physical state and pushes him overboard into the sea.

Elric is saved from drowning by the sea god Straasha, who transports Elric back to Melniboné. Elric plans his punishment for Yyrkoon, but Yyrkoon escapes, kidnapping Cymoril. Elric makes a pact with Arioch, one of the Lords of Chaos and patron of Melniboné, for Arioch's help in finding Cymoril. Straasha grants use of The Ship That Travels Over Land And Sea to Elric, and Elric overcomes Yyrkoon's magic defenses. Yyrkoon places Cymoril in a spell-induced sleep and escapes to an alternate plane. Elric pursues him through the Shade Gate.

Elric finds Yyrkoon in a magical chamber containing the mythical Runeblades: Stormbringer and Mournblade. Wielding Stormbringer, a sentient sword that devours souls, Elric defeats Yyrkoon. Rather than putting Yyrkoon to death, Elric relinquishes the throne to him and decides to wander the Young Kingdoms alone and learn of the world outside of Melniboné.

== Critical response ==
Writing for NPR, Jason Sheehan called Elric "far and away the coolest, grimmest, moodiest, most elegant, degenerate, drug-addicted, cursed, twisted and emotionally weird mass murderer of them all".
