= Richard Clifton-Dey =

British artist (1930–1997)

- Born: 29 May 1930; Yorkshire, England, UK
- Died: 5 April 1997 (aged 66)
- Known for: Illustrator

Richard Clifton-Dey (29 May 1930 – 5 April 1997) was a British artist. Born in Yorkshire, he was known mostly for Western and science fiction subjects. As in many cases of artwork produced for book covers, most of Clifton-Dey's artwork is not signed. Provenance for all works not signed by the artist is attested by his widow. His most famous work of art may be Behemoth's World, which appeared on the sleeve of the album Cultösaurus Erectus by Blue Öyster Cult.

He started painting in the 1960s and was one of the most highly respected of British illustrators during the 1970s and into the 1980s. Much of his work was for book covers, either for science fiction, fantasy, action-adventure war books, romances, or gothic horror (with some interesting forays into advertising). His cover artwork was used for the novel Lord Tyger by Philip José Farmer in 1974 and reused in 1985. The Dorian Hawkmoon series by Michael Moorcock was issued featuring Richard Clifton-Dey cover art in 1977. The French publishing company Fleuve Noir released several paperbacks from 1981 to 1987 with his artwork.

Along with other well-known artists of his day (Jim Burns, Chris Foss and others), his work was featured in the 1987 Paper Tiger UK edition of Heroic Dreams.

He has also worked in other genres including non-fiction pop-up books for children including:

- Our Living Earth (1987; text by Gillian Osband)
- Riding in Motion (1988; text by Jonathan Biggs and James Horwood)
- Space: A Three Dimensional Journey (1991; text by Brian Jones)

== Artworks ==
- Le pont de la rivière Kwaï by Pierre Boulle (1961)
- Le Loup De Badenoch by Joseph E. Chipperfield (1961)
- Contes et légendes de Wallonie by Max Defleur (1962)
- Contes et légendes d'Ecosse Quinel by Ch. and A. De Montgon (1963)
- Recits Tirés Du Theatre Grec – Contes et Légendes De Tous Les Pays by G. Chandon (1963)
- Storie della storia del mondo. Greche e barbare by Laura Orvieto (1966, 1969)
- Récits tirés du théâtre grec by G. Chandon (1967)
- Legends of Britain by S. Clot, Ch. Quinel and A. De Montgon (1968, 1969) (together with Gaston De Sainte-Croix)
- Hound-dog Man by J. T. Edson (1969)
- Swords of the Barbarians by Kenneth Bulmer (1970)
- Almuric by Robert E. Howard (1971)
- Carson of Venus by Edgar Rice Burroughs (1971, 1973)
- Agent of Chaos by Norman Spinrad (1972)
- The Divided Rose by Jean Evans (1973)
- The Small Assassin by Ray Bradbury (1973)
- The Wizard of Venus by Edgar Rice Burroughs (1973, 1975)
- Lost on Venus by Edgar Rice Burroughs (1974)
- Cashelmara by Susan Howatch (1974)
- The Masters of Bow Street by John Creasey (1974)
- Lord Tyger by Philip José Farmer (1974, 1985)
- Nobody on the Road by Geoffrey Rose (1974)
- A Clear Road to Archangel by Geoffrey Rose (1975)
- The Swiss Arrangement by William Fairchild (1975)
- Operation Nuke by Martin Caidin (1975)
- The Love Warrior by Alan Lacey (1975)
- Count Brass Michael Moorcock (1975)
- Armageddon 2419 AD by Philip Francis Nowlan (1976)
- Mystery of the Ancients: Early Spacemen and the Mayas by Eric and Craig Umland (1976)
- Keegan: The No-Option Contract by Brian Ball (1976)
- The White Dacoit by Berkely Mather (1976)
- The Fatal Friends (Killers #4) by Klaus Netzen (aka Laurence James)
- Pearl of Blood (The Killers #5) by Klaus Netzen (aka Laurence James) (1975)
- Silent Enemy (The Killers #7) by Klaus Netzen (aka Laurence James) (1976)
- The Safe House by Jon Cleary (1976)
- The Hill of the Dead (The Eagles #1) by Andrew Quiller (aka Kenneth Bulmer) (1976)
- The Land of Mist (The Eagles #2) by Andrew Quiller (aka Kenneth Bulmer) (1976)
- City of Fire (The Eagles #3) by Andrew Quiller (aka Kenneth Bulmer) (1976)
- Sea of Swords (The Eagles #5) by Andrew Quiller (aka Kenneth Bulmer) (1976)
- Dream Chariots by Manning Norvil (aka Kenneth Bulmer) (1977)
- The Cave Girl by Edgar Rice Burroughs (1977)
- The Navigator by Morris West (1977)
- A Sound of Lightning by Jon Cleary (1977)
- The Dawn Attack by Brian Callison (1977)
- All Over the Town by R. F. Delderfield (1977)
- The Jewel in the Skull: The History of the Runestaff, Book 1 by Michael Moorcock (1977)
- The Mad God's Amulet: The History of the Runestaff, Book 2 by Michael Moorcock (1977)
- The Sword of the Dawn: The History of the Runestaff, Book 3 by Michael Moorcock (1977)
- The Runestaff: The History of the Runestaff, Book 4 by Michael Moorcock (1977)
- Masters of the Pit by Michael Moorcock (1978)
- Summoned to Darkness by Anne-Marie Sheridan (1978)
- The Long Summer by Alan White (1978)
- Bagatelle by Maurice Denuzière (1978)
- Memoirs of the First Baroness by Lucinda Baker (1978)
- The Adventuress by Daoma Winston (1978)
- Mills of the Gods by Daoma Winston (1979)
- Flow My Tears, the Policeman Said by Philip K. Dick (1979)
- The Treasure of the Sierra Madre by B. Traven (1980)
- The Immortals of Science Fiction by David Wingrove (1980)
- Cultösaurus Erectus by Blue Öyster Cult, album cover (1980)
- Threshold (aka The Beginning Place) by Ursula K. Le Guin (1982, 1986)
- The Orphan (Book of the Beast #1) by Robert Stallman (1982)
- The Captive (Book of the Beast #2) by Robert Stallman (1982)
- The Beast (Book of the Beast #3) by Robert Stallman (1983)
- The Violent Land (Jubal Cade book 21) by Charles R. Pike (aka Terry Harknett) (1983)
- Wasteworld 1: Aftermath by James Barton (1983)
- Wasteworld 2: Resurrection by James Barton (1983)
- Wasteworld 3: Angels by James Barton (1984)
- Wasteworld 4: My Way by James Barton (1984)
- Greensight by Angela Shackleton-Hill (1984)
- Rebel in Time by Harry Harrison (1984, 1986)
- Hardacre's Luck by C. L. Skelton (1985)
- Menace under Marswood by Sterling E. Lanier (1985)
- The Unforsaken Hiero (book 2 in the Hiero series) by Sterling E. Lanier (1985)
- Master of Morholm by Timothy Wilson (1986)
- Greenleaf by Chloe Gartner (1986)
- Gods of Riverworld by Philip José Farmer (1986)
- Heroic Dreams by Nigel Suckling (1987)
- Bounce The Rhine: The Greatest Airborne Operation in History by Charles Whiting (aka Leo Kessler) (1987)
- Operation Northwind: The Unknown Battle of the Bulge by Charles Whiting (1987)
- Our Living Earth: An Exploration in Three Dimensions by Gillian Osband (1987)
- Our Working Earth by Gillian Osband (1987)
- Riding in Motion: A Three-Dimensional Guide to Horses for Young People by Janet Horwood and Jonathan Biggs (1988)
- Riding in Motion: Pop-up Book by Janet Horwood (1988)
- Kindred Spirits by June Barraclough (1988)
- On Stranger Tides by Tim Powers (1988)
- Monsters by Isaac Asimov, Martin H. Greenberg and Charles G. Waugh (1989)
- Space: A Three-Dimensional Journey by Brian Jones (1991)
- The Heart of the Rose by June Barraclough (1994)
- Vallamont by Pamela Gayle (1994)
- Jane Eyre by Charlotte Brontë (1999)
- The Mammoth Encyclopedia of Science Fiction by (editor) George Mann (2001)
