= Stormbringer (novel) =

1965 Michael Moorcock novel

- First edition
- Author: Michael Moorcock
- Cover artist: James Cawthorn
- Language: English
- Genre: Fantasy
- Published: 1965
- Publisher: Herbert Jenkins Ltd
- Publication place: England
- Pages: 220

Stormbringer is a 1965 novel written by Michael Moorcock and featuring the character Elric of Melniboné. It is a partly abridged fix-up of four previously published stories from Science Fantasy 1963-1964, namely "Dead God's Homecoming", "Black Sword's Brothers", "Sad Giant's Shield", and "Doomed Lord's Passing". Moorcock restored and revised the text for the 1977 US edition.

== Plot ==
In "Dead God's Homecoming", chaos beings kidnap Elric of Melniboné's wife, Zarozinia, spurring Elric into fateful actions and the recovery of Stormbringer, the demon-sword that dominates his destiny. Meanwhile, Jagreen Lern, theocrat of Pan Tang, forms an alliance with Sarosto, ruler of Dharijor, and the Dukes of Hell to take over the world. They win a decisive victory at Sequa. One of the Nihrain, servants of Balance, named Sepiriz, contacts Elric and Dyvim Slorm, owner of Stormbringer's brother sword, Mournblade. He tells them that the person who took Zarozinia is a resurrected god named Darnizhaan. Darnizhaan killed himself years ago from fear of the Black Swords, which are now the only things he will take in return for Zarozinia. Elric, Dyvim Slorm, and Elric's companion, Moonglum journey to Darnizhaan. There they are warned that Jagreen Lern's alliance with Sarosto will be the end of the Young Kingdoms. Elric and Slorm hand over the Black Swords in exchange for Zarozinia. Immediately after, they chant a rune spell Sepiriz taught them, which makes the swords come alive and kill Darnizhaan.

Later, in "Black Sword's Brothers", Elric tries to unite the kingdoms of the East and the South against Jagreen Lern, who has recently assassinated Sarosto. When this fails, Moonglum and he sail east towards the Sorceror's Isle, only for their boat to be caught in a storm and forced against the Serpent's Teeth. Stranded in Jagreen Lern's kingdom, Elric and Moonglum encounter Sepiriz again. He tells them that, with the help of a certain spell, Stormbringer can call its many companion swords, brothers like Mournblade, to fight for it. With this new information, Elric and Moonglum journey to Pan Tang, Lern's island, where Elric fights the Dukes of Hell. Upon calling Stormbringer's brothers, the Dukes are killed and sent back to the Chaos realm eternally. Stormbringer leaves him as well, taking away his strength and allowing Jagreen Lern to capture him. Lern takes Moonglum and Elric to watch the ensuing battle with the Southern kingdoms. Though the Southern Kingdoms lose, Elric is able to call Stormbringer back to him and rescue Moonglum.

Immediately after, in "Sad Giant's Shield", Elric and Moonglum go to the unconquered Isle of the Purple Towns. There they amass an army to fight Jagreen Lern. Sepiriz arrives, telling Elric about a giant named Mordaga who bears the Chaos Shield, a device capable of blocking Lern's chaos magic. Elric ignores Sepiriz' judgment, instead trying to beat Lern at the Purple Towns in a battle. He fails, largely due to several Chaos Ships commanded by an octopus demon named Pyaray. Elric and Moonglum are saved from drowning by Straasha, Lord of the Sea. They reconcile with Dyvim Slorm and the archer Rackhir the Red, and all of them embark toward the Sighing Desert in search of Mordaga. At Mordaga's castle, they fight several warriors, and Elric accidentally kills Rackhir. Mordaga surrenders and gives Elric the chaos shield. Moonglum stabs him in the back. The three remaining men go south again to find that all of the Young Kingdoms have been conquered by Jagreen Lern. Also, Zarozinia has been captured again, this time by Lern. Elric goes alone to save her, entering the Camp of Chaos where he kills Pyaray. He is too late; Zarozinia already has been transformed into a giant worm who commits suicide on Stormbringer. With the Chaos Ships destroyed by Pyaray's death, Elric leaves the Camp of Chaos and makes way for Melniboné with Moonglum and Dyvim Slorm.

During "Doomed Lord's Passing", Elric and his friends reach Melniboné, where they try to awaken several dragons. In a dream, Elric meets Sepiriz again, who takes him to the White Lords, rulers of Law. One of them, Donblas, tells Elric that the only way to bring the White Lords to his realm and stop Chaos is to blow the Horn of Fate, Olifant, three times. Olifant has the ability to, with one blast, awaken the dragons, with two blasts, herald the coming of the White Lords, and, with three blasts, end the world. Elric goes to the Tower of B'aal'nezbett in Imrryr with the Chaos Shield and enters another realm resembling England. There he meets a dwarf named Jermays, messenger of the gods, who tells him Olifant is at the grave of a dead warrior, Roland. Elric goes to the grave, but when he takes the horn from Roland's neck, he comes alive. They fight, and Elric barely wins before leaving the realm with Jermays. Back in Melniboné, he blows Olifant and awakens the dragons which he then rides, along with Dyvim Slorm and Moonglum, to the Camp of Chaos. A battle erupts, and Elric kills a Duke of Hell named Xiombarg. Dyvim Slorm dies. He then blows Olifant for the second time, ushering in the White Lords. Elric duels Jagreen Lern and bests him. Instead of killing him with Stormbringer, he tortures him for an hour, in the manner of his ancestors, before finishing him off at Moonglum's request. Eventually, Law wins the battle, and the entirety of the Young Kingdoms is changed into a new world, Earth. Sepiriz tells the last humans, Moonglum and Elric, that the only remaining thing to do is blow the Horn of Fate a third time. Elric however does not have the energy, so he is forced to kill Moonglum with Stormbringer, at which point he blows Olifant. The old world ends, and as it does, Stormbringer kills Elric, before flying into the air laughing, the last remnant of Chaos in the new world.

== Other media ==
P. Craig Russell adapted the tale into comic book form in 1997 as a seven-issue miniseries for Dark Horse Comics. The series was re-released as a hardcover collected edition by Titan Comics in 2021.
