= Elrick (name) =

Elrick is both a surname and a given name. Although in theory the name could derive from a number of Old English names (Æðelríc, Ælfríc, and Ealdríc), The Oxford Dictionary of Family Names in Britain and Ireland concludes that it in fact derives "from one of several minor places called Elrick" in Aberdeenshire. Notable people with the name include:

== Given name ==
- Elrick Irastorza, (born 1950), French general

== Surname ==
- Adrian Elrick (born 1949), New Zealand international soccer player
- George Elrick (1903–1999), British musician, impresario and radio presenter
- M.L. Elrick (born 1968), American journalist
- Mark Elrick (born 1967), New Zealand soccer player
- Nadene Elrick, New Zealand international soccer player
- Rory Elrick, (born 1995), Scottish actor
