= Cultösaurus Erectus =

- Cover art by Richard Clifton-Dey

Studio album by Blue Öyster Cult
- Released: June 1980
- Studio: Kingdom Sound (Long Island, New York)
- Genre: Hard rock
- Length: 41:10
- Label: Columbia
- Producer: Martin Birch

Blue Öyster Cult chronology
Mirrors (1979)	Cultösaurus Erectus (1980)	Fire of Unknown Origin (1981)

Singles from Cultösaurus Erectus
- 1. "Fallen Angel" Released: 18 July 1980 (UK); 2. "Deadline" Released: October 1980 (UK); 3. "Here's Johnny (The Marshall Plan)" Released: November 1980

Professional ratings
Review scores
Source	Rating
AllMusic	3/5 stars
Collector's Guide to Heavy Metal	10/10

Cultösaurus Erectus is the seventh studio album by American rock band Blue Öyster Cult, released in June 1980. Following an experiment with a more commercial sound on the album Mirrors (released the previous year), this recording marked a return to the band's earlier, heavier sound. It also represents the band's first collaboration with British producer Martin Birch (Deep Purple, Fleetwood Mac, Black Sabbath, Iron Maiden), who would also produce the band's next album Fire of Unknown Origin a year later.

While the album did sell more than its predecessor, it stalled at Gold status. However, during this time, Blue Öyster Cult was still filling large venues. The tour promoting Cultösaurus Erectus found the band co-headlining sports arenas in the United States with Black Sabbath as part of the Black and Blue Tour.

The album cover features the central part of the painting Behemoth's World by British artist Richard Clifton-Dey.

== Songs ==
"Black Blade" features lyrics by fantasy and sci-fi writer Michael Moorcock and is about Stormbringer, a black sword wielded by Elric of Melniboné, the most famous character in Moorcock's mythology.

"The Marshall Plan" includes a cameo by Don Kirshner introducing Johnny, the subject of the song, as an act on Don Kirshner's Rock Concert, a syndicated concert program popular in the 1970s and early 1980s.

== Track listing ==
All lead vocals by Eric Bloom, except where noted.

Side one
No.	Title	Writer(s)	Lead vocals	Length
1.	"Black Blade"	Eric Bloom, Michael Moorcock, John Trivers		6:34
2.	"Monsters"	Albert Bouchard, Caryn Bouchard		5:10
3.	"Divine Wind"	Donald Roeser		5:07
4.	"Deadline"	Roeser	Roeser	4:27

Side two
No.	Title	Writer(s)	Lead vocals	Length
5.	"The Marshall Plan"	Bloom, A. Bouchard, Joe Bouchard, Allen Lanier, Roeser		5:24
6.	"Hungry Boys"	A. Bouchard, C. Bouchard	A. Bouchard	3:38
7.	"Fallen Angel"	J. Bouchard, Helen Wheels	J. Bouchard	3:11
8.	"Lips in the Hills"	Bloom, Roeser, Richard Meltzer		4:24
9.	"Unknown Tongue"	A. Bouchard, David Roter		3:55

== Personnel ==
Band members

- Eric Bloom – guitar, keyboards, vocals
- Donald "Buck Dharma" Roeser – guitars, bass, keyboards, vocals
- Allen Lanier – guitar, keyboards
- Joe Bouchard – bass, vocals
- Albert Bouchard – drums, vocals

Additional musicians

- Don Kirshner – introduction during "The Marshall Plan"
- Mark Rivera – saxophone on "Monsters"

Production

- Martin Birch – producer, engineer
- Clay Hutchinson – second engineer
- Blue Öyster Cult – arrangements
- Richard Clifton-Dey – front cover painting
- Paula Scher – cover design

== Charts ==
Chart (1980)	Peak position
Canada Top Albums/CDs (RPM)	77
UK Albums (Official Charts)	12
US Billboard 200	34
