= Elric! =

Tabletop role-playing game

Dark Fantasy Roleplaying
- Cover art by John Brunner
- Designers: Lynn Willis; Richard Watts; Mark Morrison; Jimmie W. Pursell Jr.; Sam Shirley; Joshua Shaw
- Publishers: Chaosium
- Publication: 1993; 33 years ago
- Genres: Fantasy
- Systems: Basic Role-Playing

Elric!, subtitled "Dark Fantasy Roleplaying", is a fantasy tabletop role-playing game published under license by Chaosium in 1993. Based on the Elric of Melniboné books by Michael Moorcock, this is the fifth edition of the game originally titled Stormbringer.

== Description ==
The campaign starts when the world is only ten years from utter and inescapable destruction. Like Elric in the original Moorcock novels, the player characters will, during the course of play, be offered weapons, powers, spells, and quests that offer great power, but always at a cost. By engaging with these pacts, a high-level character might reach the stage where they can no longer miss a sword swing, no longer take damage from weapons or poisons, nor be outwitted.

As RPG historian Stu Horvath noted in his 2023 book Monsters, Aliens, and Holes in the Ground, the world's oncoming doom and the ability to create pacts with dark forces to become unstoppable and invulnerable "seduces players by offering a way around the randomness that so often frustrates their ambitions and, in giving them that power, sets their fate and damns them. It is a rare thing for a character not to be utterly consumed by their choices, just like Elric." Richard Watts concurred, saying, "In Elric!, everyone is self-serving. What matter such details as honour or nationalism, when in less than ten years the entire world will be one seething, shapeless seas? Law and Chaos be damned; greed and self-aggrandisement are the true gods of Elric!."

== Publication history ==
Chaosium published the first edition of Stormbringer, a role-playing game based on Michael Moorcock's Elric novels, in 1981, followed by a second edition in 1985, and a third edition in 1987. All of these used a variant of Chaosium's Basic Roleplaying, with revised rules for magic and other setting-specific elements. The fourth edition in 1990 used essentially the same set of rules with the exception of the magic system, which was changed extensively.

But the early 1990s saw the rise of role-playing games with newer rules systems such as Vampire: The Masquerade and Amber Diceless Roleplaying Game. In an effort to keep up, Chaosium produced a fifth edition retitled Elric! to differentiate it from the decade-old Stormbringer. Designers Lynn Willis, Richard Watts, Mark Morrison, Jimmie W. Pursell Jr., Sam Shirley, and Joshua Shaw substantially revised the entire game, adding additional material from several older game supplements that were no longer in print.

Game historian Shannon Appelcline noted that Chaosium began creating significant role-playing systems for the first time in nearly a decade, commenting, "The first was Elric! (1993), a totally new BRP vision of the Young Kingdoms, meant to replace the venerable Stormbringer ... The new system was cleaner and more balanced. It also downplayed demons and increased the role of common magic — perhaps making it more accessible, particularly in Middle America."

The supplement Melniboné was published in 1993, The Bronze Grimoire was published in 1994, and Atlas of the Young Kingdoms, Vol. 1: The Northern Continent, and Sailing on the Seas of Fate were published in 1996.

In 1996, Chaosium entered the collectible card game market with Mythos, but took such a loss when the new game failed that, as Appelcline noted, "Chaosium responded by shutting down several of its lines, this time Pendragon, Elric!, Nephilim, and Mythos itself."

This was the end of the Elric series of role-playing games until 2001 when Chaosium briefly published a d20 version of the game called Dragon Lords of Melniboné (2001).

=== Translations ===
- Japanese edition (1993), soft-cover, published by Hobby Japan, cover art by Yasushi Nirasawa
- French edition (1994), hardback, published by Oriflam, cover art by Hubert de Lartigue; supplement Les Mers du Destin also published
- Spanish edition (October 1997), soft-cover, published by Joc Internacional as Elric, without any exclamation mark, cover art by Frank Brunner (ISBN 84-7831-154-8)

== Reception ==
Matthew Gabbert reviewed Elric! in White Wolf #39 (1994), rating it a 3 out of 5 and stated that "As a stand-alone, complete game system, Elric! succeeds, especially for those only recently introduced to Moorcock's tragic hero. For fans of Stormbringer, the Conversion Rules allow you to update your Young Kingdoms veterans, if you feel the need."

In Issue 79 of the French games magazine Casus Belli, Tristan Lhomme called Elric! "the designated successor to Stormbringer and yet a new game, vastly different from its illustrious predecessor." Lhomme warned players of Stormbringer "be careful: the entire universe has been rewritten. And even if [the new designers] read the same novels as Ken St-André (Stormbringer's dad), they obviously didn't remember the same things. In fact, they systematically favored the most sinister and despairing elements, making Elric! a terribly dark game, which well deserves its subtitle 'Dark Fantasy'." Lhomme thought that the revision of the rules was needed, writing, "the Stormbringer system was ten years old and had aged quite badly. Of course, the substance remains the same: the good old Basic RolePlaying Game (BRPG). Regulars will be on familiar ground: the seven usual characteristics and around thirty skills rated out of 100. However, this version of the BRPG reserves enough good surprises to deserve more than a passing glance." Lhomme called the new magic system "remarkable" but found the best part of the new rules to be the combat system, calling it "undoubtedly the most efficient simulation that could be obtained starting from Basic Role-Playing. It remains simple to manage, while offering enough complexity to please gaming fanatics of the simulation." Lhomme thought that the game's strength was its "fluid and officient" system, but that the writing was often too dense and the rulebook suffered from a lack of illustrations. Lhomme concluded, "Elric! largely lives up to what one might expect: a very good game, which has everything it takes to take over from Stormbringer: more adult and more desperate than its predecessor, and more oriented towards the discovery of the world of the Young Kingdoms than towards the creation of hyper-powerful characters clad in combat demons."

In Issue 17 of Australian Realms, Richard Watts warned about the dark spirit of the game, saying, "For the referee, the challenge of making such a world attractive, not to mention enjoyable and dramatically satisfying for the players, is greater than in most fantasy games. The reward of a satisfying campaign is correspondingly high." Watts also noted, "Elric! requires referees with keen minds. Not only must you balance the players' freedom with the direction of your plot, you must also ensure that the game's overall mood and atmosphere are dark without being claustrophobic." Watts concluded, "It is the nature of beauty, and the attraction, that it is transient. So too is any campaign, and sooner or later yours must end, and a presumably, the world along with it. But if your game has been rewarding, rich, dramatic and inspirational, its death will be greeted, not with disappointment, but with satisfaction."

In Issue 77 of the Israeli magazine Wiz, David Silberstein liked the game, saying, "The game system itself is excellent, easy to learn and play, and basically combines everything a great fantasy game should have. Beyond that, you will find lots of ideas and tips for players and beginners so there is no room for worry."

== Reviews ==
- Australian Realms #13
