= Stormbringer =

Fictional sword from Michael Moorcock stories

- Stormbringer being wielded by Elric of Melniboné
- First appearance: The Dreaming City; 1961
- Created by: Michael Moorcock
- Genre: Fantasy

In-universe information
- Type: Sword, weapon
- Function: Consuming of souls
- Traits and abilities: Black, runes
- Affiliation: Elric of Melniboné

Stormbringer is a magic sword featured in a number of fantasy stories by the author Michael Moorcock. It is described as a huge, black sword covered with strange runes, created by the forces of Chaos. The sword has a will of its own and it is hinted that the sword may be controlled by an inhabiting entity. It is wielded by the doomed albino emperor Elric of Melniboné. Stormbringer makes its first appearance in the 1961 novella The Dreaming City. In the four novellas collected in the 1965 book Stormbringer, the sword's true nature is revealed.

== Description ==
This powerful enchanted black blade is a member of a demon race that takes on the form of a sword, and as such is an agent of Chaos. Stormbringer's edge is capable of cutting through virtually any material not protected by potent sorcery, and it can drink the soul from (and thereby kill) any unprotected living creature upon delivering any wound, even a scratch. Its most distinctive features are that it has a mind and will of its own, and that it feeds upon the souls of those it kills. Elric loathes the sword but is almost helpless without the strength and vitality it confers on him.

Stormbringer's hunger for souls is such that it frequently betrays Elric by creating a bloodlust in his mind, turning in his hands and killing friends and lovers. The cursed nature of the sword adds to Elric's guilt and self-loathing, even as he feels pleasure when the stolen lifeforce enters his body.

Stormbringer has a "brother" sword named Mournblade, which was at one time wielded by Elric's cousin and enemy Yyrkoon. It is identical to Stormbringer in most regards. Later stories reveal that there are thousands of identical demons, all taking the form of swords. Three such sibling blades appear in The Revenge of the Rose and many more "brother blades" are seen in the novel Stormbringer, but only Mournblade and Stormbringer are named.

In Elric of Melniboné, Elric and cousin Yyrkoon find the runeblades in a realm of Limbo and commence battle. Elric and Stormbringer disarm Yyrkoon, and Mournblade disappears. Yyrkoon is defeated, and Elric and his cousin return to Imrryr.

In The Weird of the White Wolf, Elric returns to Imrryr after a long journey and confronts Yyrkoon, who usurped the throne in his absence. Yyrkoon has regained Mournblade through unknown means and uses it to attack. Elric and Stormbringer kill Yyrkoon, and no further mention is made of Mournblade until it is later disclosed that it was recovered by the Seers of Nihrain, to be wielded by Elric's cousin, Dyvim Slorm. Imrryr is sacked, though the pillagers' fate is not much better, being pursued by the golden battle barges and the few dragons who were awakened, led by Dyvim Tvar. Only Elric's ship escapes, propelled by the aid of his sorcery.

In Stormbringer, Elric learns that the representatives of Fate, which serve neither Chaos nor Law, recovered Mournblade from the netherworld. They present it to Elric and explain that the runeblades were designed to be wielded by those with Melnibonéan royal blood as a check against the might of powerful beings including the Dead Gods of Chaos. Elric gives Mournblade to his kinsman, Dyvim Slorm, and the two men become embroiled in a confrontation between the gods. Elric summons others of Stormbringer's demonic race (also in the form of swords) to fight against a number of Dukes of Hell, brought to the Young Kingdoms by Jagreen Lern, theocrat of Pan Tang.

Ultimately, Elric's reliance on Stormbringer proves his undoing: after the utter destruction of the Young Kingdoms in the battle of Law and Chaos, just as it seems that the cosmic Balance has been restored, Stormbringer kills Elric, transforms into a humanoid demon, and leaps laughing into the sky, to corrupt the newly-remade world once more. The sword-spirit says to the dead Elric: "Farewell, friend. I was a thousand times more evil than thou!"

In the book The Quest for Tanelorn, a character claims that one of the demon's names is Satan. In the same book it is revealed that the demon can inhabit either the Black Sword or the Black Jewel, the jewel which was once embedded in the skull of Dorian Hawkmoon. Hawkmoon was an avatar, like Elric, of the Eternal Champion.

== Analysis ==
The theme of a cursed magical sword which causes evil deeds when drawn goes back to the sword Tyrfing in Norse Mythology, with which Moorcock was likely familiar. Stormbringer was influential in popularizing this trope in the fantasy genre. Moorcock intended the sword character to serve as a key element of his discussion of "how mankind's wish-fantasies can bring about the destruction of... part of mankind". Claiming influence from Freud and Jung he says: "The whole point of Elric's soul-eating sword, Stormbringer, was addiction: to sex, to violence, to big, black, phallic swords, to drugs, to escape. That's why it went down so well in the rock’n’roll world".

Literature scholar Dennis Wilson Wise wrote that "a weapon like Stormbringer reinforces liberal selfhood in a particularly concrete way. It carries a continuous external threat to personal autonomy, and it subverts a fully rational self-determination. Modern fantasy heroes, especially in epic fantasy, often rail against "destiny" or a prophecy, but such destinies and prophecies lack Stormbringer's sentient specificity."

Ontologist Levi Bryant stated that Stormbringer belongs to a special class of magical items which also appear in Dungeons & Dragons, which are not "merely passive tools", but have will, goals, alignment and a personality of their own. Stormbringer talks to, influences and struggles with its wielder Elric. Bryant saw the sword as an active entity, not unlike "some of the artificial life we are developing today", and also compared it to "technologies unleashed on the world that are agents in their own right".

== Books featuring Stormbringer ==
Elric's sword Stormbringer has appeared in all of Michael Moorcock's stories about Elric, except the prequel Folk of the Forest.

== In popular culture ==
- Tom Strong No. 31 and No. 32, "The Black Blade of the Barbary Coast" parts 1 & 2 by Alan Moore, feature albino pirate Captain Zodiac seeking the "Black Blade", a black cutlass marked with red runes. This appears to be a recurrence (a favoured Moorcock trope) of Elric and Stormbringer's tale. Almost all of Moorcock's stories about the Eternal Champion include a parallel or analog to Stormbringer, invariably wielded by the Champion.
- Lawrence Watt-Evans explicitly mentioned Moorcock's Stormbringer as an inspiration for the enchanted Black Dagger, which is at the center of his own novel The Spell of the Black Dagger and which is in many ways similar – though not identical – to Stormbringer.
- "Black Blade", the opening track of American hard rock band Blue Öyster Cult's seventh studio effort, Cultösaurus Erectus, concerns itself with Stormbringer. Moorcock himself made significant contributions to the track, having previously established a working relationship with the musical group.
- The Chronicle of the Black Sword is the fourteenth studio album by british space rock band Hawkwind. It is a concept album centered around Elric and Stormbringer, with significant contributions from Moorcock, who had a long association with the band. The follow-up live album, Live Chronicles, is a live performance of material from the studio album, and features performances by Michael Moorcock himself.
- The 1979 Advanced Dungeons & Dragons adventure module White Plume Mountain, written by Lawrence Schick and published by TSR, featured a magical sword called Blackrazor, a black vampiric blade created from an extra-dimensional being. Schick later said that he was "a little embarrassed to this day by Blackrazor, in as much as it's such a blatant rip-off of Elric's Stormbringer; I would not have put it into the scenario if I ever thought it might be published".
- The Melnibonéan character profiles are included in the first edition of Deities & Demigods, a TSR AD&D resource.
- In the opening animation short for the 1983 Daicon IV Nihon SF Taikai convention, the "Bunny Girl" is shown riding a sword with the same visual design as Stormbringer as one of numerous classic fantasy and sci-fi references in the film.
- In the fighting game series The King of Fighters, the character Heidern possesses a special move named "Stormbringer", where he stabs and drains life from the enemy.
- In the Game of Thrones episode, "The Lion and the Rose", one name that the crowd shouts out as a name for Joffrey Baratheon's Valyrian steel sword is "Stormbringer".
- In Ready Player Two, written by Ernest Cline, Nolan Sorrento wields Stormbringer after his escape from A Maximum-Security Prison.
- In Stardew Valley, the level 4 Shadow Dagger has the description "when you hold the blade to your ear you can hear 1,000 souls shrieking". This is a reference to Stormbringer.
- In 1974, Deep Purple released an album titled Stormbringer, which included a song of the same name.
- In 2014, Grand Magus released the song "Steel Versus Steel" from the album Triumph and Power, which is about Elric and Stormbringer.
- The Warhammer 40,000 sword Drach’nyen is also a demon that takes the form of a sword.
- The roguelike game Nethack features a black runesword called Stormbringer, which drains the life of living beings that it hits. It also may attack without the player meaning it.
- In the Legacy of Kain franchise, the younger portrayal of the character Kain in the Blood Omen titles bears a notable physical resemblance to Elric (possessing extremely pale skin and long pale hair), and for most of the franchise he wields a sword called Soul Reaver, which is inhabited by a living consciousness that feeds on the souls of its victims.
