= Elric of Melniboné =

Fictional character

- Elric as depicted by Michael Whelan on the 1977 cover of The Weird of the White Wolf
- First appearance: The Dreaming City, 1961 story
- Created by: Michael Moorcock

In-universe information
- Gender: Male
- Title(s): Elric VIII, 428th Emperor of Melniboné
- Occupation: Emperor, sorcerer, warrior
- Nationality: Melnibonéan

Elric of Melniboné is a fictional character created by English writer Michael Moorcock and the protagonist of a series of sword and sorcery stories taking place on an alternative Earth. The proper name and title of the character are Elric VIII, 428th Emperor of Melniboné. Later stories by Moorcock marked Elric as a facet of the Eternal Champion.

Elric first appeared in print in Moorcock's novella "The Dreaming City" (Science Fantasy No. 47, June 1961). Moorcock's doomed albino antihero is one of the better-known characters in fantasy literature, having crossed over into a wide variety of media, such as comics, music, film, and role-playing games. The stories have been continuously in print since the 1970s.

== Description ==
Elric is described in 1972's Elric of Melniboné:

It is the colour of a bleached skull, his flesh; and the long hair which flows below his shoulders is milk-white. From the tapering, beautiful head stare two slanting eyes, crimson and moody, and from the loose sleeves of his yellow gown emerge two slender hands, also the colour of bone.

Elric is the last emperor of the stagnating island civilisation of Melniboné. Physically weak, the anaemic Elric must use drugs (special herbs) to maintain his health and vitality. From childhood, he read freely in the immense royal library and learned of the world outside the Dreaming Isle. Perhaps due to this in-depth study, unlike other members of his race, Elric has a conscience. He witnesses the decadence of his culture, which once ruled the known world, and worries about the rise of the Young Kingdoms populated by humans (Melnibonéans consider themselves separate from humanity), along with the threat they pose to his empire. Because of Elric's introspective self-loathing and hatred of Melnibonéan traditions, his subjects find him odd and unfathomable. However, his cousin Yyrkoon (next in the line of succession, as Elric has no heirs) interprets this behaviour as weakness and plots Elric's death. Complicating matters is Yyrkoon's sister Cymoril, who is deeply in love with Elric; Yyrkoon covets her, and part of his plan for usurpation is to marry Cymoril himself.

In addition to his skill with herbs, Elric is an accomplished sorcerer and summoner. As emperor of Melniboné, Elric is able to call upon the traditional patron of the Melniboné emperors, Arioch, a Lord of Chaos and Duke of Hell, for aid. From the first story, Elric uses ancient pacts and agreements with not only Arioch, but various other beings—some gods, some demons—to help him accomplish his tasks.

Elric's discovery of the sword Stormbringer serves as both his greatest asset and disadvantage. The sword confers upon Elric strength, health, and fighting prowess, allowing him to do away with his dependence on drugs, but it must be fed by the souls of intelligent beings. In the end, the blade takes everyone close to Elric and eventually Elric's own soul as well. Most of Moorcock's stories about Elric feature this relationship with Stormbringer, and how it—despite Elric's best intentions—brings doom to everything he holds dear.

== Setting ==
Melniboné
- 'Elric of Melniboné' location
- Map of the Young Kingdoms, with Melniboné at centre
- Created by: Michael Moorcock
- Genre: Fantasy, Sword and sorcery

In-universe information
- Type: Monarchy
- Ethnic group: Melnibonéans
- Locations: Imrryr (capital)

Melniboné (/ˌmɛlˈnɪboʊneɪ/ mel-NIB-o-nay), also known as the Dragon Isle, is a fictional country, an island among the Young Kingdoms.

Centuries before Elric's birth, Melniboné ruled its world through sorcerous might and sheer power. By the time of Elric's birth, it has slipped from its preeminent place, being one of many nations. The Melnibonéans are not wholly human. They are skilled with magic and beautiful, though psychologically similar to cats, with a callous nature. They are bound by many ancient customs.

Melniboné's capital and only surviving city is Imrryr, known as "The Dreaming City". Most of the rest of the island has been allowed to revert to wilderness. Caverns exist below the island, in which dragons sleep, awaiting the Melnibonéans' summons to war.

== Influences ==
Moorcock acknowledges the work of Bertolt Brecht, particularly Threepenny Novel and The Threepenny Opera, as "one of the chief influences" on the initial Elric sequence; he dedicated 1972's Elric of Melniboné to Brecht. In the same dedication, he cited Poul Anderson's Three Hearts and Three Lions and Fletcher Pratt's The Well of the Unicorn as similarly influential texts. Moorcock has referred to Elric as a type of the "doomed hero", one of the oldest character-types in literature, akin to such hero-villains as Mervyn Peake's Steerpike in the Gormenghast trilogy, Poul Anderson's Scafloc in The Broken Sword, T. H. White's Lancelot in The Once and Future King, J. R. R. Tolkien's cursed hero Túrin Turambar, and Jane Gaskell's Zerd in The Serpent. John Clute considers Elric to be a deliberate parody of Robert E. Howard's Conan.

The story of Kullervo from Finnish mythology has been proposed as having influence on Poul Anderson's 1954 novel The Broken Sword and Tolkien's Túrin Turambar. Moorcock has stated that "Anderson's a definite influence [on Elric], as stated. But oddly, the Kalevala was read to us at my boarding school when I was about seven", and "from a very early age I was reading Norse legends and any books I could find about Norse stories". Moorcock in the same post stated that "one thing I'm pretty sure of, I was not in any way directly influenced by Prof. T[olkien]".

Elric's albinism appears influenced by Monsieur Zenith, an albino Sexton Blake villain whom Moorcock appreciated enough to write into later multiverse stories. Moorcock read Zenith stories in his youth and has contributed to their later reprinting, remarking that it "took me forty years to find another copy of Zenith the Albino! In fact it was a friend who found it under lock and key and got a copy of it to Savoy who are, at last, about to reprint it! Why I have spent so much energy making public the evidence of my vast theft from Anthony Skene, I'm not entirely sure...". Moorcock later said: "As I've said in my introduction to Monsieur Zenith: The Albino, the Anthony Skene's character was a huge influence. For the rest of the character, his ambiguities in particular, I based him on myself at the age I was when I created Elric, which was 20". The influence of Zenith on Elric is often cited in discussions of Zenith.

== List of stories ==
Elric has appeared in many stories since 1962, which have been republished in several collections.

== Characters in the Elric series ==
- Arioch: Lord of Chaos.
- Cymoril: A Melnibonéan, Elric's cousin, consort and first great love. He hopes to one day make her his wife and empress. She tries to understand and help Elric, but like his subjects, she has difficulty understanding Elric's motivations and would have him rule as the emperors of old. Despite that she stands by Elric in his weakest state before his acquiring of Stormbringer and she supports his dreams and wishes even when she is put in danger by them.
- Dyvim Slorm: A Melnibonéan, Elric's cousin, son of Dyvim Tvar. He fights alongside Elric in the final war against Chaos, wielding the black sword Mournblade.
- Dyvim Tvar: A Melnibonéan, one of Elric's few friends. He is one of the Dragon Masters, a group of Melnibonéans who can speak to the Dragons of Melniboné. Dyvim Tvar stays loyal to Elric even after he destroys Imrryr. Dyvim Tvar also has more of a moral compass than most Melnibonéans.
- Ernest Wheldrake: An amiable poet and bard who involuntarily travels across the Multiverse. Amorous and good-natured, he is given to sudden expulsions of verse and song. He is writing an epic poem about Elric during their shared adventures.
- Jagreen Lern: The cruel ruler of Pan Tang, skilled with both magic and the use of a battleaxe.
- Moonglum of Elwher: A short, red-haired human with a cheerfully ugly face, adventuring companion to Elric. He and Elric share many dangers and rewards together. The most steadfast and loyal companion of all the Young Kingdom humans Elric encounters. He helps Elric in completing his fated purpose.
- Myshella of Law: Colloquially referred to as the Empress of the Dawn and The Dark Lady of Kaneloon, the powerful sorceress Myshella has acted as a guide and consort to Eternal Champions and adventurers alike down through the ages in the ineffable pursuit of Law. Immortal, ageless, and indescribably powerful. She sometimes rides a metal bird with emerald eyes, and more than once lends this mount to Elric.
- Oone: A Dreamthief by trade, at the Silver Flower Oasis in the Sighing Desert, Lady Oone helps Elric locate The Fortress of the Pearl when another of her order dies in a previous attempt. Her fleeting romance with the albino has considerable significance during the later 'Moonbeam Roads' trilogy.
- Prince Gaynor The Damned: A fallen knight of the Balance, doomed to suffer without release by the forces of Chaos. He inhabits a formless existence, imprisoned in a black-and-gold suit of armor emblazoned with the 8-pointed symbol of Chaos.
- Rackhir, the Red Archer: A human, once a Warrior Priest of Phum but cast out of his order. He and Elric travel and adventure together several times throughout the series. Unlike other characters who serve either Law or Chaos, Rackhir devotes himself to the Balance exclusively.
- Sepiriz: One of the ten remaining Nihrain, this dark-skinned servant of the Balance guides Elric through the final phases of his quest. He is also sometimes called 'The Knight in Black and Yellow'.
- Shaarilla of Myyrrhn: The daughter of a dead necromancer, Shaarilla of the Dancing Mist was born a mutant and an outcast among her people. Unlike her fellows of Myyrrhn, Shaarilla was born without wings. She enlists Elric to locate The Dead Gods' Book in the hopes it might contain a spell to reverse her deformity.
- Smiorgan Baldhead: A Count of the Isle of the Purple Towns, and an affable adventurer who accompanies Elric on his adventures on the Nameless Continent. His fleets aid in the Sacking of Imrryr.
- Theleb K'aarna: A human sorcerer of the Pan Tang isles. After being displaced as Queen Yishana's advisor and chief sorcerer by Elric, he seeks revenge and uses sorcery to hinder several of Elric's plans.
- The Rose: A beautiful, scarlet-haired warrior Elric encounters on his journeys through the Multiverse. She wields a Lawful counterpart to Elric's Chaos-forged demonblade 'Stormbringer' named 'Swift Thorn'. Serving neither Law nor Chaos, she has sworn an oath of revenge against Gaynor The Damned for the eradication of a universe that was precious to her.
- Yishana of Jharkor: A human, ruler of Jharkor. She presents Elric with several problems/adventures and openly covets his company and power. Her selfish desires are the root of several of Elric's problems, but she also aids him from time to time and ultimately becomes an important ally in his fight against Chaos.
- Yyrkoon: Prince of Melniboné, Elric's cousin. He is next in line for the throne, as Elric has no male heir. He worries about Elric's behaviour and takes all of Elric's brooding and philosophical talk as a sign of weakness. He yearns for a return to more traditional emperors and secretly plots Elric's demise. Yyrkoon is a great sorcerer who has made many pacts with unholy forces to obtain his sorcerous strength. As further evidence of his decadent ways, he openly desires his sister Cymoril and intends to make her his wife and Empress if his plans ever reach fruition.
- Zarozinia: A human of the Young Kingdoms. She falls in love with Elric and eventually marries him, for a time allowing him to experience true love and companionship. For her sake, Elric also gives up his blade Stormbringer and reverts to taking sorcerous herbs to sustain his life.

== In popular culture ==
=== Anthologies ===
Two anthologies of works by other authors set in the Moorcock multiverse have been published:

- Moorcock, Michael (1994). Michael Moorcock's Elric: Tales of the White Wolf. White Wolf. ISBN 1-56504-175-5.
- Collins, Nancy A. (1996). Pawn of Chaos: Tales of the Eternal Champion. White Wolf Publishing, Incorporated. ISBN 1-56504-933-0.

=== Comics ===
Conan the Barbarian No. 14 (March 1972), Elric's second appearance in comics. Cover art by Barry Windsor-Smith.

The Elric saga has also been adapted for comics and graphic novels several times:

- In 1968, the French artist Philippe Druillet drew the first comics version of Elric in Spirits #1, written by Michel Demuth, which was published as a book the same year.
- In the early 70s James Cawthorn published his oversized graphic novel Stormbringer with Savoy Books.
- Elric first appeared in large-circulation comics in America in Conan the Barbarian issues 14–15 (1972), in an adventure in two parts entitled "A Sword Called Stormbringer!" and "The Green Empress of Melniboné". The comic was written by Roy Thomas and illustrated by Barry Windsor-Smith, based on a story plotted by Michael Moorcock and James Cawthorn.
- Star Reach comics published Elric stories in the late 1970s. First Comics published several Elric mini-series in the 1980s as well.
- P. Craig Russell has drawn comics adaptations of several Moorcock stories: Elric of Melniboné (with Roy Thomas and Michael T. Gilbert, 6-issue mini-series, Pacific Comics, 1983–1984), The Dreaming City and While the Gods Laugh (with Roy Thomas, Epic Comics, tpb, Marvel Graphic Novel No. 2, Marvel Comics, 1982), and Stormbringer (7-issue limited series, 1997, trade paperback, Dark Horse Comics, 224 pages, 1998, ISBN 1-56971-336-7). The character has also been adapted by Walter Simonson, Frank Brunner, George Freeman, and others in the long-running Elric series at Pacific which Russell had co-created (reportedly tensions between him and Thomas were the reason for his departure).
- 2011 marked the launch of another Elric-based comic, Elric: The Balance Lost by BOOM! Studios. The series, written by Chris Roberson and drawn by Francesco Biagini, is available in both traditional hard copy and for digital download.
- In 2014, The Ruby Throne, the first volume of a new four-volume adaptation of Elric of Melniboné written by Julien Blondel and illustrated by Didier Poli, Jean Bastide, and Robin Recht, was published by Glenat in France and titan in UK. The second volume, Stormbringer, was published in March 2015 by the same team and publisher. The third volume, entitled The White Wolf, was released in September 2017. The fourth volume, The Dreaming City, was released in August 2021. A second cycle of four tomes is beginning in 2024 with the release by GLÉNAT of ELRIC TOME 5 - LE NÉCROMANCIEN (The Necromancer), an adaptation of THE WEIRD OF THE WHITE WOLF by Julien Blondel and Jean-Luc Carradines Cano, with art by Valentin Sécher.

=== Music ===
- The name of the album Stormbringer by the British heavy rock band Deep Purple is taken from the name of Elric's sword.
- The lyrics of "Perfect Strangers", the title track from Deep Purple's 1984 album of the same name, are inspired by Elric.
- The Chronicle of the Black Sword is a 1985 album by UK space rock band Hawkwind. Moorcock and Hawkwind had, at this stage, collaborated a number of times, most prominently on their 1975 album Warrior on the Edge of Time, itself also inspired by the Eternal Champion concept. An expanded live album, Live Chronicles, was released in 1986. This included several spoken-word interludes by author Moorcock in his capacity as on-stage narrator. The live show also included a mime artist portraying Elric himself. A video concert film entitled The Chronicle of the Black Sword appeared on VHS and later on DVD.
- The song "Black Blade" was recorded for the album Cultösaurus Erectus (1980) by Blue Öyster Cult, written by singer/guitarist Eric Bloom with lyrics by Moorcock. Moorcock also collaborated on the songs "The Great Sun Jester" (Mirrors (1979)) and "Veteran of the Psychic Wars" (Fire of Unknown Origin (1981)).
- The heavy metal band Tygers of Pan Tang take their name from the fictional islands of Pan Tang in the Elric series, where the ruling wizards keep pet tigers.
- The UK space rock (later heavy metal) band Mournblade take their name from the sister-sword of Elric's blade Stormbringer.
- New wave of British heavy metal band Diamond Head made Elric one of the primary lyrical subjects of their 1982 release Borrowed Time. The album also featured the character on the cover art, painted by Rodney Matthews.
- Blind Guardian, a German power metal band, included the song Fast to Madness in their 1989 album Follow the Blind, about Elric of Melniboné.
- Italian Power Metal Band Domine have released four albums based heavily on Elric, namely "Champion Eternal" in 1997, "Dragonlord" in 1999, "Stormbringer Ruler" in 2002 and "Emperor of the Black Runes" in 2004.
- The song "Ilian of Garathorm" from Times of Obscene Evil & Wild Daring (2019) by heavy metal band Smoulder is based on Ilian, one of the iterations of the Eternal Champion. Moorcock himself both wrote and narrated the introduction to the song "Victims of Fate" from the band's second album Violent Creed of Vengeance (2023).

=== Film ===
- Wendy Pini published a book documenting her attempt to make an animated film project of the Stormbringer series, Law and Chaos: The "Stormbringer" Animated Film Project.
- In May 2007, in an interview with Empire magazine, directors Chris and Paul Weitz stated that they were in the process of adapting a trilogy of films based on Elric for Universal Pictures. Chris grew up reading the material and has met with Moorcock, who trusted them with the project. Universal dropped the project and it is now in the hands of New Republic Pictures.

=== Television ===
- In November 2019, New Republic announced the development of a television series based on the Elric novels, to be adapted by Glen Mazzara and Vaun Wilmott.

=== Role-playing games ===
- Elric (along with Stormbringer) was listed in the first printing of Advanced Dungeons & Dragons (AD&D) Deities & Demigods rule book. However, Chaosium already had a role-playing series in the works based on Elric and Stormbringer, and the initial AD&D printing was not fully authorised. A mutually beneficial deal was worked out between Chaosium and TSR, yet TSR chose to remove Elric from later printings of Deities & Demigods. However, it is worth noting that this depiction of events has been directly contradicted by both Jim Ward as well as Michael Moorcock. Both Ward and Moorcock are on record as stating that TSR had license to use the materials with Moorcock additionally stating that he was "quite enthusiastic about it" and that he had given non-exclusive licenses to both companies for free.
- The world of Elric's Young Kingdoms was the setting of the Stormbringer role-playing game by the publisher Chaosium (Hawkmoon has also been so treated, as has Corum). In 1993 Chaosium released Elric! which used their Basic Role-Playing system.
- After a disagreement between Moorcock and Chaosium, the Stormbringer line was discontinued. Subsequently, a new version called "Elric of Melniboné" was published by Mongoose Publishing under their Runequest system in 2007.
- An independently published French role-playing game inspired primarily by the Elric Saga, Black Sword Hack, was released in 2020. It has since received significant attention within the "Old School Renaissance" movement.

=== Video game ===
A video game based on Elric was in development by Haiku Studios and to be published by Psygnosis for the PlayStation during the late 1990s. Development of another Elric video game followed. This was entitled Stormbringer: Elric of Melniboné and was to be released on Sega Dreamcast and PC. The game was cancelled when it failed to find a publisher.

=== Stormbringer ===
There have also been several references in popular culture to Elric's sword Stormbringer.

== Critical response ==
Writing for NPR, Jason Sheehan calls Elric "far and away the coolest, grimmest, moodiest, most elegant, degenerate, drug-addicted, cursed, twisted and emotionally weird mass murderer of them all".
