= Michael Moorcock bibliography =

This is a bibliography of the works of Michael Moorcock.

== Fiction ==
=== Work centred on Elric of Melniboné ===
==== Individual stories ====
The character Elric first appeared in print in a series of novelettes, novellas, and short tales, many of which were published in Science Fantasy magazine. The author later wrote a trilogy of novels about Elric and Oona von Bek. The Elric stories have frequently been edited, retitled, and combined with other material to form fix-ups as part of later republications.

Internal Chronology	Publishing Order	Title	Form	Date	Originally published in
1	30	The Folk of the Forest	Novelette	2023	The magazine New Edge Sword and Sorcery, Fall 2023
2	14	Elric of Melniboné	Novel	1972	Standalone ISBN 0-09-112100-0
3	20	The Fortress of the Pearl	Novel	1989	Standalone ISBN 0-441-24866-7
4	22	The Black Blade's Summoning (aka The White Wolf's Song, aka The Black Blade's Song)	Novelette	1994	The anthology Michael Moorcock's Elric: Tales of the White Wolf, edited by Richard Gilliam and Edward E. Kramer
5	16/17	Sailing To the Future	Novelette	1976	The collection The Sailor on the Seas of Fate by Michael Moorcock
6	16/17	Sailing To the Present (revision of The Lands Beyond the World which was published later)	Novella	1976	The collection The Sailor on the Seas of Fate by Michael Moorcock
7	15	Sailing To the Past (revision of The Jade Man's Eyes)	Novelette	1973	Stand-alone ISBN 0-85659-010-X
8	19	Elric at the End of Time	Novelette	1981	The anthology "Elsewhere", edited by Mark Alan Arnold and Terri Windling
9 (Note: Some collections place this earlier, before the Elric of Melniboné novel.)	11	The Dream of Earl Aubec (aka Master of Chaos)	Short Story	May 1964	The magazine Fantastic Stories of Imagination
10	1	The Dreaming City	Novelette	June 1961	The magazine Science Fantasy No. 47
11	26	A Portrait in Ivory	Short Story	2007	The anthology Logorrhea: Good Words Make Good Stories, edited by John Klima
12	2	While the Gods Laugh	Novelette	October 1961	The magazine Science Fantasy No. 49
13	12	The Singing Citadel	Novelette	May 1967	The anthology The Fantastic Swordsmen, edited by L. Sprague de Camp
14	13	The Vanishing Tower (aka The Sleeping Sorceress)	Novella	1971	The anthology Warlocks and Warriors, edited by Douglas Hill
15	21	The Revenge of the Rose	Novel	1991	Stand-alone ISBN 0-441-00106-8
16	3	The Stealer of Souls	Novelette	February 1962	The magazine Science Fantasy No. 51
17	4	Kings in Darkness	Novelette	August 1962	The magazine Science Fantasy No. 54
18	28	Red Pearls (aka How Elric Pursued His Weird into the Far World)	Novelette	2010	The anthology Swords and Dark Magic, edited by Lou Anders and Jonathan Strahan
19	27	Black Petals (aka How Elric Discovered an Unpleasant Kinship)	Novelette	2008	The magazine Weird Tales March–April 2008
20	29	White Steel (aka In Which our Heroes Discover a Lost Past)	Novella	2022	The collection The Citadel of Forgotten Myths by Michael Moorcock
21	5	The Flame Bringers (alternative title: The Caravan of Forgotten Dreams)	Novelette	October 1962	The magazine Science Fantasy No. 55
22	18	The Last Enchantment (aka Jesting with Chaos)	Short Story	1978	The anthology Ariel: The Book of Fantasy, Volume Three, edited by Thomas Durwood
23	6	To Rescue Tanelorn	Novelette	December 1962	The magazine Science Fantasy No. 56
24	7	Dead God's Homecoming	Novella	June 1963	The magazine Science Fantasy No. 59
25	8	Black Sword's Brothers	Novella	October 1963	The magazine Science Fantasy No. 61
26	9	Sad Giant's Shield	Novella	February 1964	The magazine Science Fantasy No. 63
27	10	Doomed Lord's Passing	Novella	April 1964	The magazine Science Fantasy No. 64
28 (Note: Takes place while Elric is dreaming in the middle of Doomed Lord's Passing)	25	The White Wolf's Son (aka Son of the Wolf)	Novel	2005	Standalone ISBN 0-446-61745-8
Uncertain	23	The Dreamthief's Daughter (aka Daughter of Dreams)	Novel	2001	Standalone ISBN 0-446-61120-4
Uncertain	24	The Skrayling Tree (aka Destiny's Brother)	Novel	2003	Standalone ISBN 0-446-53104-9

==== Collections ====
The first five novelettes were originally collected in The Stealer of Souls (1963), and the later four novellas were first published as a novel in an edited version called Stormbringer (1965). The 1965 novel had roughly a quarter of the text removed to make it more concise, with cuts made mostly to the second and third novellas. To make sense of the restructuring, new bridging material was added to the remaining text.

In 1977, DAW Books republished Elric's saga in six books that collected the tales according to their internal chronology:

1. Elric of Melniboné (Hutchinson, 1972, cut vt [variant title] The Dreaming City Lancer, 1972 US; DAW, 1977) ISBN 0-425-08843-X
2. The Sailor on the Seas of Fate (Quartet, 1976; DAW 1977), ISBN 0-441-74863-5
3. The Weird of the White Wolf (collection, DAW, 1977, contains "The Dream of Earl Aubec", "The Dreaming City", "While the Gods Laugh" and "The Singing Citadel"), ISBN 0-441-88805-4
4. The Sleeping Sorceress (NEL, 1971; Lancer, 1972 as The Vanishing Tower; DAW 1977), ISBN 0-441-86039-7
5. The Bane of the Black Sword (DAW, 1977, fixup of "The Stealer of Souls", "Kings in Darkness", "The Flame Bringers" and "To Rescue Tanelorn"), ISBN 0-441-04885-4
6. Stormbringer (cut, Herbert Jenkins, 1965; restored and revised, DAW, 1977, Berkeley, 1984, fixup of "Dead God's Homecoming", "Black Sword's Brothers", "Sad Giant's Shield" and "Doomed Lord's Passing"), ISBN 0-425-06559-6

The DAW paperbacks all featured cover art work by Michael Whelan and helped define the look of Elric and his sword Stormbringer. The DAW edition of Stormbringer restored some of the original structure and text compared to the 1965 release, but other revisions were performed and other material excised. A few oddments were collected in Elric at the End of Time (1984, ISBN 1-85028-032-0), which became the seventh book in the DAW line when they released it in the United States in 1985. It includes two Elric-related tales: the title story and 1962's "The Last Enchantment", originally intended as the final Elric story but put aside in favour of those that eventually made up Stormbringer; it was not published until 1978.

Several subsequent collections grouped some of the stories together in the same way the DAW versions did, and used the same titles for some of the groups. There were also cases where the same book title was used by multiple publishers for different collections of stories.

In 1984, Nelson Doubleday/Science Fiction Book Club republished much of the Elric material then-available in The Elric Saga: Part One and The Elric Saga: Part Two. As new material was published, they expanded their collection with The Elric Saga: Part Three in 2002 and The Elric Saga: Part Four in 2005.

In the 1990s, Orion Publishing/Millennium released a two-book collection – Elric of Melniboné and Stormbringer – containing the Elric material then available. White Wolf Publishing released a similar two-volume compilation – Elric: Song of the Black Sword (1995) and Elric: The Stealer of Souls (1998). These two-volume compilations are arranged according to the internal chronology of the saga. The White Wolf text has minor revisions when compared to the Millennium release.

In 2001, Orion/Gollancz republished the first nine short stories, including the full text of Stormbringer as it appeared in Science Fantasy, in a single volume as Elric, volume 17 in the Fantasy Masterworks series.

From 2008 to 2010, Del Rey Books reprinted the material as a series of six illustrated books called Chronicles of the Last Emperor of Melniboné:

- Elric: The Stealer of Souls, ISBN 0-345-49862-3
- Elric: To Rescue Tanelorn (collects "To Rescue Tanelorn", "The Last Enchantment", "Master of Chaos", "The Singing Citadel", "The Jade Man's Eyes", "Elric at the End of Time", "The Black Blade's Song" (aka "The Black Blade's Summoning"), and some non-Elric stories), ISBN 0-345-49863-1
- Elric: The Sleeping Sorceress, ISBN 0-345-49864-X
- Duke Elric, ISBN 0-345-49865-8
- Elric in the Dream Realms (collects "The Fortress of the Pearl", "A Portrait in Ivory", and the script of the Elric: The Making of a Sorcerer graphic novel), ISBN 0-345-49866-6
- Elric: Swords and Roses, ISBN 0-345-49867-4

The Del Rey series arranged the stories in the sequence they were originally published, along with related fiction and nonfiction material. The version of Stormbringer featured in this collection restored all the original material missing since the 1977 DAW edition – which had formed the basis for all later editions – as well as Moorcock's preferred versions of all the revised material in an attempt to produce a definitive text. These volumes present the evolution of the character through early juvenile stories, early fanzine musings by Moorcock, some Elric stories, some others introducing the reader to the wider "Eternal Champion" theme, stories of other heroes who coexist with Elric in the realm of Melniboné, unpublished prologues, installments of Moorcock's essay "Aspects of Fantasy", a 1970s screenplay, a reader's guide, notes from an Elric series that never developed, contemporary reviews, and appreciation essays by other writers.

From 2013 to 2018, Victor Gollancz Ltd. republished much of Michael Moorcock's back catalogue, presented in internal chronological order along with previously unpublished material, in both print and e-book formats. Eight volumes included Elric stories:

- Elric of Melniboné and Other Stories, ISBN 978-0-575-11309-1
- Elric: The Fortress of the Pearl, ISBN 978-0-575-11343-5
- The War Amongst the Angels, ISBN 978-0-575-09273-0
- Elric: The Sailor on the Seas of Fate, ISBN 978-0-575-11360-2
- Elric: The Sleeping Sorceress, ISBN 978-0-575-11388-6
- Elric: The Revenge of the Rose, ISBN 978-0-575-11410-4
- Elric: Stormbringer!, ISBN 978-0-575-11438-8
- Elric: The Moonbeam Roads, ISBN 978-0-575-10659-8 (collects "The Dreamthief's Daughter", "The Skrayling Tree", and "The White Wolf's Son")
- When Saga Press published The Citadel of Forgotten Myths with new Elric material in 2022, Victor Gollancz Ltd. published their own version of that book too ISBN 978-1-3996-0037-8.

From 2019 to 2023, Centipede Press republished a limited edition run of seven volumes with many of the Elric stories: Elric of Melniboné, The Fortress of the Pearl, The Sailor on the Seas of Fate, The Sleeping Sorceress, The Revenge of the Rose, Stormbringer, and The Dreamthief's Daughter.

The latest collection, from 2022, was by Saga Press, who republished a 4-volume collection of Elric stories:

- Elric of Melniboné, ISBN 978-1-5344-4570-3 (collects "Elric of Melniboné", "The Fortress of the Pearl", "The Sailor on the Seas of Fate" and "The Weird of the White Wolf")
- Stormbringer, ISBN 978-1-5344-4571-0 (collects "The Vanishing Tower", "The Revenge of the Rose", "The Bane of the Black Sword" and "Stormbringer")
- The White Wolf, ISBN 978-1-5344-4574-1 (collects "The Dreamthief's Daughter", "The Skrayling Tree", and "The White Wolf's Son")
- The Citadel of Forgotten Myths, ISBN 978-1-9821-9980-7 (collects "Red Pearls", "Black Petals", and "White Steel")

The 2022 Saga Press collection is missing a few minor old Elric stories which do not effect the overall narrative: Elric at the End of Time, The Black Blade's Summoning, A Portrait in Ivory, and The Last Enchantment. The 2008–2010 Del Rey Books collection has all the old stories, but it's missing some of the newer stories: "Red Pearls", "White Steel", "The Dreamthief's Daughter", "The Skrayling Tree", and "The White Wolf's Son". The 2013–2018 Victor Gollancz collection has all the old and new Elric stories except for "Elric at the End of Time", plus all of the Elric collections are missing the 2023 story "The Folk of the Forest" (which is currently only available in New Edge Sword and Sorcery).

==== Comics ====
Michael Moorcock wrote several comics about Elric:

- 1973: Elric: The Return to Melniboné (with illustrations by Philippe Druillet)
- 1979: Elric (with illustrations by Frank Brunner)
- 1997–1998: Michael Moorcock's Multiverse, a 12-issue original story published by the Helix imprint of DC Comics. The illustrations were by Walter Simonson, Mark Reeve, and John Ridgway. It was later collected as a single-edition graphic novel by Vertigo, 288 pages, November 1999, ISBN 978-1-56389-516-6).
- 2004: Elric: Making of a Sorcerer, a four-issue original story published by DC Comics, with illustrations by Walter Simonson. It describes Elric's magical training before the events of the novel Elric of Melniboné. 208 pages, DC Comics, July 2007, ISBN 1-4012-1334-0)

==== In other languages ====
In 2011, Moorcock published the novel Les Buveurs D'Âmes with author Fabrice Colin. It was written in French, and has not been translated into English.

==== By other authors ====
Several other authors have written works about Elric.

=== Corum Jhaelen Irsei ===
Corum (his name is an anagram of "Jeremiah Cornelius"; he was mentioned in an early list of Champion avatars as 'Corom Bannon Flurron') was the lead in a pair of trilogies and made appearances in several other books, notably The Sailor on the Seas of Fate, The Sleeping Sorceress and The Quest for Tanelorn.

The first trilogy, The Prince in the Scarlet Robe, consists of:

- The Knight of the Swords (1971) sometimes referred to as Corum – The Knight of Swords: The Eternal Champion
- The Queen of the Swords (1971)
- The King of the Swords (1971)

The three were first collected as The Swords Trilogy (1977) and later reissued as The Swords of Corum (1986)

The first and third volumes won the August Derleth Award and were adapted into a 12-issue comic series entitled The Chronicles of Corum (1986–88)

The second trilogy, The Prince with the Silver Hand, consists of:

- The Bull and the Spear (1973)
- The Oak and the Ram (1973)
- The Sword and the Stallion (1974)

The three were first collected as The Chronicles of Corum (1978). The last volume also won the August Derleth Award, while the first book was adapted into the four-issue comic series Corum: The Bull and the Spear.

=== Dorian Hawkmoon ===
The first series, a tetralogy, consists of:

- The Jewel in the Skull (1967)
- Sorcerer's Amulet (vt The Mad God's Amulet) (1968)
- The Sword of the Dawn (1968)
- Secret of the Runestaff (vt The Runestaff) (1969)

These four volumes were later collected as The History of the Runestaff and adapted into a two-issue comic series in 1986. The four novels were collected in two volumes in 2015 as Jewel and Amulet and Sword and Runestaff.

The Chronicles of Castle Brass is the second Hawkmoon series and forms a kind of culmination for the entire saga of the Eternal Champion:

- Count Brass (1973)
- The Champion of Garathorm (1973)
- The Quest for Tanelorn (1975)

These three volumes were later collected as the box set/omnibus The Chronicles of Castle Brass.

=== Jerry Cornelius ===
Cornelius first appeared in a quartet of novels (TFP was initially published in parts in the magazine New Worlds):

- The Final Programme (1968, cut without authorisation; first published in full, Allison & Busby, 1969)
- A Cure for Cancer (Allison & Busby, 1971)
- The English Assassin (Allison & Busby, 1972)
- The Condition of Muzak (Allison & Busby, 1977)

After the third book a collection, The Lives and Times of Jerry Cornelius (Allison and Busby, 1976), was released. The first edition included "The Peking Junction", "The Delhi Division", "The Tank Trapeze", "The Nature of the Catastrophe", "The Swastika Set-Up", "The Sunset Perspective", "Sea Wolves", "Voortrekker", "Dead Singers", "The Longford Cup" and "The Entropy Circuit". The 1987 edition includes "The Dodgem Division" as an epilogue. The 2004 edition replaced "Dead Singers", "The Swastika Set-Up", "The Longford Cup", "The Entropy Circuit" and "The Dodgem Division" with "The Spencer Inheritance", "The Camus Connection", "Cheering for the Rockets" and "Firing the Cathedral". The 1987 edition has been superseded by The New Nature of the Catastrophe, which includes its entire contents along with "The Murderer's Song", "The Gangrene Collection" and "The Roumanian Question". The paperback also included "All the Way Round Again", which had previously appeared as "The Enigma Windows" in Fabulous Harbours.

The next series of four short novels was collected as A Cornelius Calendar: The Entropy Tango (1981), The Adventures of Una Persson and Catherine Cornelius in the 20th Century (1976), The Great Rock 'n' Roll Swindle (a.k.a. Gold Diggers of '77) (1980) and The Alchemist's Question (1984). The main sequence continued with Firing the Cathedral (2002), Modem Times 2.0 (2008), Cheering for the Rockets (2007), Pegging the President (2018), The Fracking Factory (2018) and The Wokingham Agreement (2022).

Moorcock's original story "The Adventures of Jerry Cornelius" (co-written with M. John Harrison) also appeared in The Distant Suns (1975, with James Cawthorn). It was adapted as a comic in The New Nature of the Catastrophe, a volume of Cornelius stories by Moorcock and several others. Cornelius was also the lead of the five-issue comics series "Midnight Kiss" (2005). Moorcock's Doctor Who novel The Coming of the Terraphiles (2010) featured a Captain Cornelius.

=== The von Bek family ===
Graf Ulrich von Bek was introduced in the first volume of the trilogy and his descendants feature in the sequels.

- The War Hound and the World's Pain (1981)
- The Brothel in Rosenstrasse (1982)
- The City in the Autumn Stars (1986)

Members of the family also feature in:

- The rewritten "Flux" (with Barrington J. Bayley)
- The Dragon in the Sword (1987, with Erekosë)
- The rewritten The Sundered Worlds
- The rewritten "The Pleasure Garden of Felipe Sagittarius"
- "The White Wolf's Song", a.k.a. "The Black Blade's Summoning" (1994, with Elric)
- "The Cairene Purse" (2002)
- The Dreamthief's Daughter (2001, a.k.a. Daughter of Dreams)
- The Skrayling Tree (2003, a.k.a. Destiny's Brother)
- The White Wolf's Son (2005, a.k.a. Son of the Wolf)

Several stories were collected in Von Bek (1995) by White Wolf Publishing.

=== Erekosë ===
The original Eternal Champion trilogy is:

- The Eternal Champion (1970)
- Phoenix in Obsidian (1970, a.k.a. The Silver Warriors)
- The Dragon in the Sword (1986)

He also appears in the graphic novel The Swords of Heaven, the Flowers of Hell (with Howard Chaykin).

=== Sojan the Swordsman ===
- Sojan the Swordsman
- Daughter of a Warrior King (1957)
- Mission to Asno (1957)
- Revolt in Hatnor (1957)
- The Hordes Attack (1957)
- The Purple Galley (1958)
- The Sea Wolves! (1958)
- Sojan at Sea (1958)
- The Sea of Demons (1958)
- Prisoners in Stone (1958)
- Sojan and the Sons of The Snake-God (1958)
- Sojan and the Plain of Mystery (1958)
- Sojan and the Hunters of Norj (1958)
- Klan The Spoiler (1958)
- Dek of Noothar (1958)
- The Siege of Noothar (1958)
- Rens Karto of Bersnol (1958)

Originally published in Moorcock's juvenile weekly "Tarzan Adventures" which he edited in the 1950s the first twelve Sojan stories were collected in "Sojan the Swordsman" (1984).

=== Kane of Old Mars ===
1. Warriors of Mars (a.k.a. City of the Beast) (1965)
2. Blades of Mars (a.k.a. Lord of the Spiders) (1965)
3. Barbarians of Mars (a.k.a. Masters of the Pit) (1965)

Moorcock later wrote a novelette, "The Lost Canal", which is a sequel to the Kane of Old Mars trilogy, set one million years later. It was first published in the 2013 anthology Old Mars, edited by George R. R. Martin and Gardner Dozois.

=== Jherek Carnelian and the Dancers at the End of Time ===
The original trilogy is:

1. An Alien Heat (Harper and Row, 1972)
2. The Hollow Lands (Harper and Row, 1974)
3. The End of All Songs (Harper and Row, 1976)

The Hollow Lands won the August Derleth Award in 1976, Moorcock's fourth time in five years.

Three short stories in the same setting ("Pale Roses", "White Stars" and "Ancient Shadows") were assembled as Legends from the End of Time (1976). This collection was released as an omnibus with a novel in the same setting, The Transformation of Miss Mavis Ming (a.k.a. A Messiah at the End of Time, based on the short story, Constant Fire) (1977), in the 1989 omnibus, Tales from the End of Time. Elric appeared with the Dancers in "Elric at the End of Time" (1981) and a new story, "Sumptuous Dress: A Question of Size at the End of Time" was published in the Summer 2008 issue of Postscripts. A 1993 edition from Millennium included the three short stories and the Elric addition, along with Constant Fire – which is not the original story but rather a revised chapter from The Transformation of Miss Mavis Ming. It had been planned that the omnibus would have the full (revised) Mavis Ming novel but by error only included the revised chapter. The full (revised) novel later appeared in Behold the Man and other stories (1994, Phoenix House).

=== The Multiverse trilogy ===
- The Sundered Worlds (a.k.a. The Blood Red Game) (1965)
- The Fireclown (a.k.a. The Winds of Limbo) (1965)
- The Twilight Man (a.k.a. The Shores of Death) (1966)

=== Oswald Bastable ===
1. The Warlord of the Air (1971) (the UK edition changed names for unspecified legal reasons)
2. The Land Leviathan (1974)
3. The Steel Tsar (1981)

The trilogy was collected as A Nomad of the Time Streams.

=== Travelling to Utopia ===
- The Wrecks of Time (a.k.a. The Rituals of Infinity) (1967)
- The Ice Schooner (1969)
- The Black Corridor (1969) with Hilary Bailey [only as by Michael Moorcock]

=== Second Ether ===
1. Blood (1995)
2. Fabulous Harbours (1995) (collects "The White Pirate", "Some Fragments found in the Effects of Sam Oakenhurst", "The Black Blade's Summoning", "Lunching With the Antichrist", "The Affair of the Seven Virgins", "The Girl Who Killed Sylvia Blade", "Crimson Eyes", "No Ordinary Christian", "The Enigma Windows" and "Epilogue: The Birds of the Moon")
3. The War Amongst the Angels (1996)

=== Karl Glogauer ===
Glogauer appears in Behold the Man (1969) and Breakfast in the Ruins (1972). He also cameos in The English Assassin and The End of All Songs.

=== Jerry Cornell ===
A duology of comic spy adventures (revised from two Nick Allard books, see below):

- The Chinese Agent (1970), revised from Somewhere in the Night (1966)
- The Russian Intelligence (1980), revised from Printer's Devil (1966)

=== Colonel Pyat – Between the Wars ===
- Byzantium Endures (1981)
- The Laughter of Carthage (1984)
- Jerusalem Commands (1992)
- The Vengeance of Rome (2006)

=== The Sanctuary of the White Friars ===
- The Whispering Swarm (2015)
- The Woods of Arcady (2023)
- The Wounds of Albion (2026)

=== Doctor Who ===
In 2010, Moorcock wrote a Doctor Who novel, The Coming of the Terraphiles. A version of Jerry Cornelius makes an appearance.

=== Sexton Blake and Monsieur Zenith ===
As well as writing one of the Sexton Blake novels, Caribbean Crisis (1962), Moorcock wrote The Metatemporal Detective, a collection including "The Affair of the Seven Virgins", "Crimson Eyes", "The Ghost Warriors", "The Girl Who Killed Sylvia Blade", "The Case of the Nazi Canary", "Sir Milk-and-Blood", "The Mystery of the Texas Twister", "London Flesh", "The Pleasure Garden of Felipe Sagittarius", "The Affair of Le Bassin Les Hivers" and "The Flaneur des Arcades de l'Opera". Another Moorcock Zenith story, "Curare", appeared in the 2012 anthology Zenith Lives!.

=== Nick Allard ===
The first was published as by Roger Harris (who had written the book, with some edits by Moorcock); the other two were by Moorcock writing as Bill Barclay:

- The LSD Dossier (1965)
- Somewhere in the Night (1966), later revised as the Jerry Cornell novel The Chinese Agent (1970)
- Printer's Devil (1966), later revised as the Jerry Cornell novel The Russian Intelligence (1980)

=== Other novels ===
- The Deep Fix (1964 novella)
- Behold the Man (0riginal 1966 novella and winner of the 1967 Nebula Award for Best Science Fiction and Fantasy Novella later rewritten and extended into the 1969 novel)
- The Time of the Hawklords (1976) (with Michael Butterworth) – mostly written by Butterworth, two later novels in the series were solely by Butterworth
- The Lands Beyond the World (1977 novella)
- Gloriana (1978) (World Fantasy Award for Best Novel winner 1979, John W. Campbell Memorial Award for Best Science Fiction Novel winner 1979) (Moorcock later made changes to the novel, but the original text was republished in the latest Gollancz edition, 2013)
- The Golden Barge (1979) written in the late 1950s, an excerpt was published in New Worlds in 1965
- The Real Life Mr Newman (1979 novelette published as chapbook, 56 pp)
- Mother London (1988) shortlisted for the Whitbread Prize for fiction
- The Cairene Purse (1990 novella)
- The Birds of the Moon: A Travellers' Tale (1995 novelette published as chapbook)
- Ravenbrand (2000 novella)
- Silverheart (2000) (with Storm Constantine)
- King of the City (2000)
- The Sunday Books (2011) (with Mervyn Peake)
- Sojan the Swordsman (2013)
- Dancing in Rome (2018 novella, published in French as Danse à Rome)

=== Other collections ===
- The Deep Fix (1966) (inc. title story and "Peace on Earth", "The Love Beast", "The Pleasure Garden of Felipe Sagittarius", "Wolf")
- The Time Dweller (1969) (inc. title story and "The Mountain", "Escape from Evening", "Consuming Passion", "The Ruins")
- The Singing Citadel (1970) (short stories inc. the title story, "Master of Chaos" and two other non-Elric stories "The Great Conqueror", "To Rescue Tanelorn")
- Moorcock's Book of Martyrs (1976) (also appeared as Dying for Tomorrow, 1978, inc. "A Dead Singer", "The Great Conqueror", "Good-Bye Miranda", "Flux", "Islands", "Waiting for the End of Time")
- Sojan (1977) (inc. "The Stone Thing: A Tale of Strange Parts", "The Dying Castles", "Sojan the Swordsman", "Sojan, Swordsman of Zylor!", "Sojan" (essay), "Elric" (1964 essay))
- My Experiences in the Third World War (1980) (inc. "Going to Canada", "Leaving Pasadena", "Crossing into Cambodia", "The Dodgem Division", "The Adventures of Jerry Cornelius: The English Assassin" (graphic story), "The Real Life Mr Newman (Adventures of the Dead Astronaut)" (variant of the original 1966 novelette))
- The Entropy Tango (1981) (inc. "Harlequin's Lament", "The Minstrel Girl", "Revolutions", "The Kassandra Peninsula", "For One Day Only: Two Mighty Empires Clash")
- Elric at the End of Time (1984) (inc. title story, "The Last Enchantment", "The Secret Life of Elric of Melnibone", "Sojan", "New Worlds- Jerry Cornelius" (essay), "In Lighter Vein" (essay))
- The Opium General and Other Stories (1984) (inc. title story, "The Alchemist's Question", "Starship Stormtroopers" (essay), "Nestor Makhno" (essay), "Who'll Be Next" (essay))
- Tales from the End of Time (1989) (inc. "Pale Roses", "White Stars", "Ancient Shadows", "A Messiah at the End of Time")
- Casablanca (1989) (inc. title story, "The Frozen Cardinal", "Hanging the Fool", "The Murderer's Song", "Mars", "The Last Call", "Scratching a Living" (essay), "Mervyn Peake" (essay), "Harlan Ellison" (essay), "Angus Wilson" (essay), "Andrea Dworkin" (essay), "Maeve Gilmore" (essay), "Taking the Life Out of London" (essay), "The Smell of Old Vienna" (essay), "Literally London" (essay), "People of the Book" (essay), "London Lost and Found" (essay), "Building the New Jerusalem" (essay), "Who's Really Covering Up?" (essay), "What Feminism Has Done For Me" (essay), "Caught Up in Reality" (essay), "Anti-Personnel Capability" (essay), "The Case Against Pornography" (essay), "Gold Diggers of 1977 (Ten Claims That Won Our Hearts)")
- Earl Aubec and Other Stories (1993) (inc. title story, "Jesting with Chaos", "Going Home", "Environment Problem", "Goodbye Miranda", "The Stone Thing", "My Life", "The Museum of the Future", "To Rescue Tanelorn")
- Behold the Man and Other Stories (1994) (inc. title story, "Constant Fire", "Breakfast in the Ruins")
- Lunching with the Antichrist (1995) (inc. title story, "A Winter Admiral", "Wheel of Fortune", "Dead Singers")
- Tales from the Texas Woods (1997) (inc. "The Ghost Warriors", "The Further Adventures of Sherlock Holmes", "I: The Adventure of the Texan's Honour by John M. Watson, M.D.", "Johnny Lonesome Comes to Town: A Tale of the Far West", "Sir Milk-and-Blood: An Incident in the Life of the Eternal Champion", "About My Multiverse" (essay), "How Tom Mix Saved My Life" (essay), "A Catalogue of Memories: The Family Library Vol. XVII No. VII" (essay), "Sword of Irony: An Introduction to Fritz Leiber's Grey Mouser Stories" (essay), "The Sun of Its Parts" (essay), "The Arabian Nights: A Companion by Robert Irwin" (review), "My Comic Life" (essay), "Bryan Talbot's The Adventures of Luther Arkwright" (essay), "Disarming Evil" (essay), "From the Teeth of Angels by Jonathan Carroll" (review))
- Earl Aubec (1999) (variant of the 1993 collection inc. "The Golden Barge: A Fable")
- London Bone (2001) (inc. title story, "London Blood", "Doves in the Circle", "The Clapham Antichrist", "Furniture", "Through the Shaving Mirror", Afterword: "Lost London Writers" (London Bone) (essay))
- Elric: To Rescue Tanelorn (2008) (short stories inc. "The Jade Man's Eyes", "The Black Blade's Song" – variant of "The White Wolf's Song", 1994), "Crimson Eyes", "Phase 1: A Jerry Cornelius Story" (novella))
- The Best of Michael Moorcock (2009) (inc. "A Portrait in Ivory", "The Visible Men", "A Dead Singer", "Colour", "A Slow Saturday Night at the Surrealist Sporting Club")
- My Experiences in the Third World War and Other Stories: The Best Short Fiction of Michael Moorcock Volume 1 (2013)
- The Brothel in Rosenstrasse and Other Stories: The Best Short Fiction of Michael Moorcock Volume 2 (2013)
- Breakfast in the Ruins and Other Stories: The Best Short Fiction of Michael Moorcock Volume 3 (2013)
- Elric: The Sleeping Sorceress (2013) – Gollancz edition, inc. Elric novel plus other non-Elric short stories, "The Eternal Champion" (1962), "Earl Aubec of Malador", "The Roaming Forest: A Tale of the Red Archer", "The Flaneur des Arcades de l'Opera", Introduction to the Michael Moorcock Collection (essay appearing in all Gollancz editions), Aspects of Fantasy: Part 4: Conclusion (essay)
- Kaboul (2018) – first published in French, title story published in English as "Kabul" (2019) (inc. "Le retour d'Odysseus" ("Odysseus Came Home"))

=== Other comics ===
- Blitz Kid (2002); with Walter Simonson, in 9/11: The World's Finest Comic Book Writers and Artists Tell Stories To Remember
- Tom Strong Book 6 (2006)

== Anthologies edited ==
He has also edited a number of other volumes, including two bringing together examples of invasion literature:

- Best S.F. Stories from New Worlds (1967)
- Best S.F. Stories from New Worlds 2 (1968)
- Best S.F. Stories from New Worlds 3 (1968)
- The Traps of Time (1968)
- Best SF Stories from New Worlds 4 (1969)
- Best SF Stories from New Worlds 5 (1969)
- The Inner Landscape (1969) (uncredited)
- Best SF Stories from New Worlds 6 (1970)
- Best SF Stories from New Worlds 7 (1971)
- Best SF Stories from New Worlds 8 (1974)
- Before Armageddon (1975)
- England Invaded (1977)
- New Worlds: An Anthology (1983, revised 2004)
- The New Nature of the Catastrophe (1993, with Langdon Jones, revised from 1971's The Nature of the Catastrophe)

== Non-fiction ==
- The Retreat from Liberty: The Erosion of Democracy in Today's Britain (1983)
- Letters from Hollywood (1986)
- Wizardry and Wild Romance: A Study of Epic Fantasy (1987, revised 2004)
- Fantasy: The 100 Best Books (London: Xanadu Publications, 1988, ISBN 0-947761-24-1; Carroll & Graf, 1988, ISBN 0-88184-335-0), by James Cawthorn and Moorcock)
  - Fantasy: The 101 Best Books (Gateway/Orion Publishers, 2017, ISBN 978-1-4732-1984-7 with James Cawthorn revised and reissued)
- Death Is No Obstacle co-written with Colin Greenland (1992)
- Into the Media Web: Selected Short Non-Fiction, 1956–2006 (2010)
- London Peculiar and Other Nonfiction (2012) with Allan Kausch

== Selected essays ==
- "Starship Stormtroopers", Moorcock, The Opium General (Harrap, 1984); original(?) 1977
- "Epic Pooh", BFS Booklet 4 (British Fantasy Society, February 1978), 15 pp.

== Music ==
=== Michael Moorcock & The Deep Fix ===
- Live at the Terminal Cafe (2019)
- The Entropy Tango & Gloriana Demo Sessions (2008)
- Roller Coast Holiday (2006)
- New World's Fair (1975)

=== Blue Öyster Cult ===
- Fire of Unknown Origin (1981), lyrics for "Veteran of the Psychic Wars"
- Cultösaurus Erectus (1980), lyrics for "Black Blade"
- Mirrors (1979), lyrics for "The Great Sun Jester"

=== Hawkwind ===
- Live Chronicles (1986), voice and writing credits for "The Chronicle of the Black Sword", "Dead God's Homecoming", "Dragon Song", and "The Final Flight", and lyrics for "Choose Your Masques" and "Sleep of a Thousand Tears"
- The Chronicle of the Black Sword (1985), lyrics for "Sleep of a Thousand Tears"
- Zones (1983), lyrics and vocals for "Running Through The Back Brain" and lyrics for "Sonic Attack"
- Choose Your Masques (1982), lyrics for "Choose Your Masks" and "Arrival in Utopia"
- Sonic Attack (1981), vocals on "Coded Languages", and lyrics for "Sonic Attack", "Psychosonia", "Coded Languages", and "Lost Chances"
- Warrior on the Edge of Time (1975), vocals and lyrics
- Space Ritual (1973), lyrics for "The Black Corridor" and "Sonic Attack"

=== Spirits Burning ===
- The End Of All Songs - Part 2 by Spirits Burning & Michael Moorcock (2025), vocals, harmonica, and lyrics
- The End Of All Songs - Part 1 by Spirits Burning & Michael Moorcock (2023), vocals, harmonica, and lyrics
- Evolution Ritual by Spirits Burning (2021), harmonica
- The Hollow Lands by Spirits Burning & Michael Moorcock (2020), vocals, harmonica, and lyrics
- An Alien Heat by Spirits Burning & Michael Moorcock (2018), vocals, harmonica, and lyrics
- Our Best Trips: 1998 to 2008 by Spirits Burning (2009), vocals, guitar, and lyrics on "Every Gun Plays its Own Tune" and interview sample on "Second Degree Soul Sparks"
- Alien Injection by Spirits Burning (2008), vocals, guitar, mandolin, and lyrics
- Reflections in a Radio Shower by Spirits Burning (2001), interview sample on "Second Degree Soul Sparks"

=== Other appearances ===
- Hype by Robert Calvert (1981), guitar (12 String), banjo, vocals (background)
- Lucky Leif and the Longships by Robert Calvert (1975), banjo

== Film ==
- The Final Programme (1973), adaptation of Moorcock's novel directed by Robert Fuest
- The Land That Time Forgot (1974), screenplay
