= The Brothel in Rosenstrasse =

1982 novel by Michael Moorcock

- Dust jacket from the first edition.
- Author: Michael Moorcock
- Cover artist: Henri Gervex
- Language: English
- Genre: Romance novel
- Publisher: New English Library
- Publication date: 1982
- Publication place: United Kingdom
- Media type: Print (hardback)
- Pages: 191 pp
- ISBN: 0-450-04877-2
- OCLC: 8305005
- Dewey Decimal: 823/.914 19
- LC Class: PR6063.O59 B7 1982

The Brothel in Rosenstrasse is a 1982 novel by Michael Moorcock. The main character is Rickhardt von Bek, a member of the family of Ulrich von Bek which is central to some of Moorcock's other fantasy novels, notably The War Hound and the World's Pain, The City in the Autumn Stars, and The Dragon in the Sword. The novel is written as Bek's memoir of a dying, demented man, in which he recalls his time with a bi-sexual teenage nymphet girl and how they take refuge in a superior brothel in a German city under siege during a 19th-century war. The standard German spelling of the name in the novel's title is "Rosenstraße" (Street of Roses).

Unlike other Bek stories, this novel is not a fantasy, though John Clute refers to it as "a fantasy of sexual torment set in a very slightly displaced Europe." Although it takes place in a fictitious location—the free city of Mirenburg, capital of a similarly fictitious independent state bordering Germany called Waldenstein—it is otherwise realistic in content. Moorcock describes Mirenburg as "an attempt to produce an ideal middle European city", and it is believed to be based partly on Prague.

Moorcock also recorded and released a single called "Brothel in Rosenstrasse". The song was included as a bonus track on the Griffin Records rerelease of the Michael Moorcock and Deep Fix album The New Worlds Fair.

== Bibliography ==
- "Internet Speculative Fiction Database".
- "Moorcock's Miscellany". Archived from the original on 17 November 2007.
- Brown, Charles N.; William G. Contento. "The Locus Index to Science Fiction (1984-1998)".
