= Von Bek (collection) =

Von Bek is a 1995 novel written by Michael Moorcock.

== Plot summary ==
Von Bek is a novel in which the second omnibus volume in the reissued Eternal Champion series gathers four tales—The War Hound and the World's Pain, The City in the Autumn Stars, The Dragon in the Sword, and The Pleasure Garden of Felipe Sagittarius—which follow various incarnations of the Von Bek family, German aristocrats charged with protecting the Holy Grail through time and across dimensions. Central to the narrative is the eternal conflict between Law and Chaos, unfolding across Moorcock's signature Multiverse. Among the book's settings is the Mittle March, a fantastical plane echoing Earth with reversed seasons and a permeable boundary for the damned.

== Reception ==
Gideon Kibblewhite reviewed Von Bek for Arcane magazine, rating it a 9 out of 10 overall, and stated that "The variety of places, characters and incidents conjured up in Von Bek is astonishing. Much of the action in the stories takes place in the Mittle March - a plane that in some ways resembles our own save that the seasons are reversed, the fantastic resides there, and only the damned may pass into it through its gates. For this wondrous place alone, this is a book worth reading. For storytelling skill and original thought, it's a book that stands tall alongside anything else Moorcock has written."

== Reviews ==
- Review by Don D'Ammassa (1995) in Science Fiction Chronicle, #182 May 1995
- Review by Chris Gilmore (1995) in Interzone, December 1995
