= Middle March =

Middle March or Middle Marches may refer to:

- Central March, historical subdivision of Muslim Iberia
- Middle March, a historical part of Scottish Marches
- Mittelmarch, a fictional place in The City in the Autumn Stars by Michael Moorcock
- Mittelmark, region in the March Brandenburg

== See also ==
- Middlemarch (disambiguation)
