= Epic Pooh =

1978 opinion article by Michael Moorcock

"Epic Pooh" is a 1978 essay by the British science fiction writer Michael Moorcock, which aims to review the field of epic fantasy, with a particular focus on epic fantasy written for children. In it Moorcock critiques J. R. R. Tolkien's The Lord of the Rings for its politically conservative assumptions and its escapism. Originally written for the British Science Fiction Association, "Epic Pooh" was revised for inclusion in Moorcock's 1989 book Wizardry and Wild Romance, and updated in another revision in 2008. Critics and scholars have objected to multiple aspects of Moorcock's essay.

== Essay ==
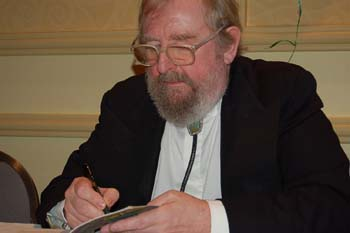
Michael Moorcock wrote the essay "Epic Pooh".

In his 1978 essay "Epic Pooh", the science fiction writer Michael Moorcock criticises a group of celebrated writers of epic fantasy for children, including J. R. R. Tolkien, C. S. Lewis, and Richard Adams. His criticism is based on two principal grounds: what he sees as the poverty of their writing style, and their politics. Moorcock accuses these authors of espousing a form of "corrupted Romance", which he identifies with Anglican Toryism. The defining traits of this attitude are an anti-technological, anti-urban stance which Moorcock sees as ultimately misanthropic, that glorifies a vanishing or vanished rural idyll, and is rooted in middle-class or bourgeois attitudes towards progress and political change. The title arises from Moorcock's argument that the writing of Tolkien, Lewis, Adams and others has a similar purpose to the Winnie-the-Pooh writings of A. A. Milne, another author of whom he disapproves: it is, according to Moorcock, fiction intended to comfort rather than challenge. Fantasy writers whom Moorcock cites approvingly in the essay, by contrast, include Terry Pratchett, Ursula K. Le Guin and Alan Garner. "Epic Pooh" was included in Moorcock's 1989 book Wizardry and Wild Romance.

=== Revisions ===
A 2008 revision to the piece adds a mention of the author J. K. Rowling and drops those whose names had become less familiar. In an author's note, Moorcock also identifies Philip Pullman's His Dark Materials as deserving credit. As an example of the revision, from the original

... are successful. It is the tone of Warwick Deeping's Sorrell and Son, of John Steinbeck at his worst, or, in a more sophisticated form..."

and from the revised version

... are successful. It is the tone of many forgotten British and American bestsellers, well-remembered children's books, like The Wind in the Willows, you often hear it in regional fiction addressed to a local audience, or, in a more sophisticated form..."

== Analysis ==
The essay has been criticised by multiple authors from different backgrounds. "Epic Pooh" and Edmund Wilson's essay "Oo, Those Awful Orcs" have been called "infamous negative criticisms" of Tolkien. The Israeli historian Ishay Landa calls "Epic Pooh" a "prototypical critique" of Tolkien's supposedly "'complacent' escapism", in which Moorcock views Tolkien as "essentially a conservative, soothing container of social tensions." Richard Forest notes Moorcock's "famously dim view of Tolkien's moral and aesthetic vision". Thomas Ingram states that "Epic Pooh" is "unfair to Tolkien at many points", but that Tolkien's ideas of race were indeed "noxious". The Tolkien scholar David Bratman writes that "one wonders what book Moorcock read, because it's certainly not The Lord of the Rings." He suggests that Moorcock never read the book, explaining why the fragments Moorcock quotes are "entirely out of context".

Madawc Williams, in the Tolkien Society's journal Mallorn, comments that "Moorcock has simply sneered at Tolkien without knowing what he is talking about," describing the essay as "a shallow work; the ramblings of a light-weight thinker with a fairly average knowledge of literature." Williams notes that Moorcock attempts to treat fantasy as distinct from folktale, legend, or myth, but comments that all four of these are tightly interrelated. Williams notes that The Lord of the Rings embodies many influences, from the Welsh language to the First World War, so attempts to categorise it may easily fail. Moorcock's idea that fairy tales say nothing serious, and ignore death, is simply wrong, writes Williams. As for The Lord of the Rings, it may resemble a fairy tale in that it has a happy ending in Sauron's downfall, but it has a sad one in the departure of the Elves, he notes. The protagonist Frodo is incurable; the hero Aragorn wins his kingdom and marries the Elf-lady Arwen, but that tale too "ends in death and tragic parting." In short, Williams writes, Tolkien's writing is informed by the real world and personal experience of war, and is far broader in its reach than Moorcock's own writing.

== Legacy ==
The science fiction author China Miéville has in the scholar of literature Eric Sandberg's view adopted Moorcock's "critique of Tolkien's conservative politics". Sandberg notes that Moorcock called The Lord of the Rings "a pernicious confirmation of the values of a declining nation with a morally bankrupt class whose cowardly self-protection is primarily responsible for the problems England answered with the ruthless logic of Thatcherism," while Miéville mentions Tolkien's "small-minded and reactionary love for hierarchical status-quos" and "belief in absolute morality that blurs moral and political complexity".
