= Phoenix in Obsidian =

1970 novel by Michael Moorcock

- Cover of the first edition
- Author: Michael Moorcock
- Cover artist: Bob Haberfield
- Language: English
- Series: Erekosë
- Genre: Fantasy novel
- Publisher: Mayflower
- Publication date: 1970
- Publication place: United Kingdom
- Media type: Print (Paperback)
- Pages: 127 pp
- ISBN: 0-583-11800-3
- OCLC: 5543062
- Preceded by: The Eternal Champion
- Followed by: The Dragon in the Sword

Phoenix in Obsidian (published in the US as: The Silver Warriors) is a science fantasy novel by Michael Moorcock. First published in 1970, it is the second book in a series that follows the adventures of the Eternal Champion as he is flung from one existence to another. The first book in the series, The Eternal Champion, told the story of John Daker, an average 20th-century man who suddenly found himself incarnated as Erekosë, a legendary hero of Earth in the distant past (or distant future). He had been called to lead humanity against its Eldren foes, but ended up taking the Eldren's side. Phoenix in Obsidian continues the story, which is concluded in The Dragon in the Sword. The trilogy is part of a larger cycle about the Eternal Champion as defender of the Multiverse.

Having resolved the human-Eldren war, Erekosë finds himself once again called to a strange world to defend Earth from invaders. This time he is Count Urlik Skarsol, Lord of the Frozen Keep, sleeping hero of a frozen and dying Earth. At Rowernarc, the Obsidian City, he hears of the Silver Warriors from the Moon, which long ago crashed into the other side of the Earth. But nobody in Rowernarc seems to fear them—nobody, indeed, seems concerned with anything but whiling away the time until death. With nothing to do and no foe to fight, Erekosë wonders who could have called him and searches for a way to return to his lost love.

In The Eternal Champion, Erekosë bore the sword Kanajana, a weaker version of Stormbringer. As Urlik, he finds the Black Sword (also known as the Cold Sword) in its purest, most virulent form. Like Stormbringer, Urlik's Cold Sword is vampiric and sentient, and it demands the blood of friends as the price for its aid.

The title Phoenix in Obsidian comes from a scene halfway through the book, when Erekosë, in the guise of Urlik, spends a short time in an obsidian cave. He reflects that he is like a phoenix, immortal by virtue of being reborn time and again, yet he is trapped in the obsidian cave like a fly in amber.

== Plot summary ==
When the story begins, Erekosë has ended the war and found peace. Then the dreams of eternal struggle, that tormented him in The Eternal Champion, begin again. He finds himself transported into the body of Urlik Skarsol, driving a chariot pulled by polar bears across an ice sheet. He encounters a party of frog-like humans who take him to Rowernarc. There he meets the debauched Bishop Belphig and the ascetic Lord Shanosfane, known as 'the Lord Temporal.'

Belphig eventually invites him on a hunt for the fearsome 'sea-stag'. On the trip, Urlik begins dreaming of the Black Sword; then, while he is awake, a mysterious bell tolls, a Screaming Chalice appears, and a voice orders Urlik to take up the Black Sword. He refuses. Finally they hunt the sea-stag to its island lair. Many of the hunters are killed and, though he succeeds in killing the stag, Urlik is left for dead. He is rescued by another party from the wholesome human settlement of the Scarlet Fjord, led by Bladrak Morningspear. On the advice of the Lady of the Chalice, they have been ringing the bell that summoned him from his life as Erekosë. They have with them the Cold Sword, which he instinctively fears and has sworn not to use, though he later does so almost against his own will.

During a raid to rescue prisoners from the Silver Warriors, Urlik learns that Bishop Belphig has been engaged in slave trade with them. Bladrak summons the Lady of the Chalice for advice. She tells Urlik to take the Cold Sword and rescue Shanosfane. Shanosfane reveals that Belphig commands the Silver Warriors because he holds their Silver Queen hostage; then he is killed by the Cold Sword. Soon Belphig places the Scarlet Fjord under siege and the situation becomes desperate. Again they consult the Lady, who tells them that the Silver Queen is held hostage in Moon, which is a city but also the Moon itself, crashed to earth ages before.

Via an 'air chariot,' Urlik rescues the Queen and learns that she is also the Lady of the Chalice, who was able to advise them remotely. They return to the Scarlet Fjord. When the alien Silver Warriors see that their Queen is free, they turn against Belphig. After the battle, she tells him of a legend that the chalice contains the blood of the sun. Suddenly Urlik understands his dreams. The two go out on the ice. While she summons the Screaming Chalice, he kills her. The Black Sword pours its blood into the Chalice, then the Chalice is taken up to renew the sun and the Sword vanishes.

In the Dorian Hawkmoon novel The Quest for Tanelorn, Erekosë learns more about the events that concluded Phoenix in Obsidian. Renewing the sun, an act that aided humanity, was so greatly counter to the nature of the entity Stormbringer that it was driven out of its habitation in the Black Sword and was forced to seek another body.
