= Middlemarch (disambiguation) =

Middlemarch is a novel by George Eliot.

Middlemarch may also refer to:

== Places ==
- Middlemarch, New Zealand, a town

== Arts, entertainment, and media ==
- Middlemarch (1968 TV series), a BBC production directed by Joan Craft and starring Michele Dotrice
- Middlemarch (1994 serial), a 1994 BBC production directed by Anthony Page, screenplay by Andrew Davies

== See also ==
- Middle March (disambiguation)
