= The Swords Trilogy =

Fantasy novel series by Michael Moorcock

- Cover of the first US edition.
- Author: Michael Moorcock
- Language: English
- Series: Corum
- Genre: Fantasy novel
- Publisher: Berkley Books
- Publication date: 1977
- Publication place: United States
- Media type: Print (paperback)
- Pages: 403 pp
- ISBN: 0-425-03468-2

The Swords Trilogy is a series of fantasy novels by Michael Moorcock about Corum Jhaelen Irsei, an aspect of the Eternal Champion. It consists of three books published in 1971: The Knight of the Swords, The Queen of the Swords, and The King of the Swords. In the UK the trilogy has been published under the titles The Swords of Corum, Corum, and most recently Corum: The Prince in the Scarlet Robe (volume 30 of Orion's Fantasy Masterworks series). The Swords Trilogy is the original title in the US where it has more recently been published as Corum: The Coming of Chaos. It is followed by a second trilogy about Corum, The Prince with the Silver Hand (US title: The Chronicles of Corum).

== Plot summary ==
The Knight of the Swords
- Cover of the first edition.
- Author: Michael Moorcock
- Cover artist: Bob Haberfield
- Language: English
- Series: Corum
- Genre: Fantasy novel
- Publisher: Mayflower
- Publication date: 1971
- Publication place: United Kingdom
- Media type: Print (paperback)
- Pages: 143 pp
- ISBN: 0-583-11860-7
- Followed by: The Queen of the Swords

=== The Knight of the Swords ===
The Knight of the Swords is the first appearance of Corum, last survivor of the Vadhagh race. After his family is butchered by a group of Mabden (men) led by the savage Earl Glandyth-a-Krae, Corum tries to take revenge, but is captured instead; his hand is cut off and his eye put out before he escapes. He goes to Moidel's Castle, where he is taken in by a very different sort of Mabden, the Margravine Rhalina. Corum and Rhalina fall in love, but their romance is interrupted when Glandyth leads an assault on the castle. Rhalina uses sorcery (which Corum had never believed in) to summon a ship of the dead which drives off the barbarians. However the bargain required means that she must go with the ship's captain. Corum joins them and the ship takes them to the island of Shool, a near immortal and mad sorcerer who takes Rhalina hostage.

Shool trades Corum two artifacts to replace his lost hand and eye, the Hand of Kwll and the Eye of Rhynn. The Eye allows Corum to see into an undead netherworld; the Hand serves to summon the last beings killed by Corum, to fight for him. Shool explains that Corum's ill fortune has been caused by a Greater God, Arioch, one of the Sword Rulers. When Arioch and his fellow Chaos Lords conquered the Fifteen Planes, the balance between the forces of Law and Chaos tipped in favor of Chaos. Corum is sent to steal the Heart of Arioch, which will give the sorcerer power to become a great god himself. After an adventurous journey which teaches him more about the metaphysics of Chaos, Corum reaches Arioch's palace. There he finds the Heart, at which point Shool's unknowing role as an agent of Arioch is revealed. The Hand of Kwll crushes the heart, killing Arioch. Corum returns to the island to rescue Rhalina. As it turns out, Shool's powers were entirely of Arioch's gift, so he can no longer threaten Rhalina or Corum. The couple return to their home on Moidel's Mount.

The Queen of the Swords
- Cover of the first edition.
- Author: Michael Moorcock
- Cover artist: David McCall Johnson
- Language: English
- Series: Corum
- Genre: Fantasy novel
- Publisher: Berkley Books
- Publication date: 1971
- Publication place: United States
- Media type: Print (paperback)
- Pages: 160 pp
- ISBN: 0-425-08737-9
- Preceded by: The Knight of the Swords
- Followed by: The King of the Swords

=== The Queen of the Swords ===
In the planes over which she rules, Xiombarg—a Greater God and one of the Lords of Chaos, known as the "Queen of the Swords"—is winning the battle against the humanoid inhabitants. She continues the fight in Corum's plane, sending Prince Gaynor the Damned to direct the barbarian armies.

Corum, with Jhary-a-Conel and Rhalina, crosses the planes and find a world claimed by Chaos with plains of dried blood and other outlandish geography. They meet the King Without A Country, the last of his people who is seeking the City in the Pyramid. They find the city which turns out to be a floating one that originated in Corums own world - and the inhabitants are his kin. The city is under intermittent attack and for the moment its superior technology defends it. It could return to Corum's world but needs special minerals to provide sufficient energy. They are able to send Corum and his companions back to seek the minerals in his own world. There he finds the last human city under threat from a monstrous army of barbarians and chaos allies. He seeks out Gaynor and defeats him in single combat. With Gaynor banished the barbarian armies are largely leaderless but still a terrible threat. Arkyn, a lord of law, supplies the materials needed and they are sent back to Xiombarg's worlds. At the same time the barbarian armies crash against the last city standing. At the last moment the Sky city comes between the planes to help the defenders. Driven by anger Xiombarg follows the Floating city through the rift between the planes. This is in violation of the Cosmic Balance and the balance sends her back and restores Donblas, Arkyn's brother lord of law. The sky ships of the City destroy the barbarian armies with their wondrous weapons.

The King of the Swords
- Cover of the first edition.
- Author: Michael Moorcock
- Cover artist: David McCall Johnson
- Language: English
- Series: Corum
- Genre: Fantasy novel
- Publisher: Berkley Books
- Publication date: 1971
- Publication place: United States
- Media type: Print (paperback)
- Pages: 158 pp
- ISBN: 0-425-02070-3
- Preceded by: The Queen of the Swords
- Followed by: The Bull and the Spear

=== The King of the Swords ===
Corum's peace is destroyed by a great spell - the cloud of contention - that sets everyone against each other. The inhabitants of the Sky city turn on each other. The forces of Law are broken again. Corum and his companions travel in a sky boat across the planes. Rhalina is taken by the King of Swords. In trying to get back to his own planes and time he meets two other aspects of the eternal Champion Elric and Erekose all three seeking Tanelorn. Corum and Jhary arrive at their version of Tanelorn and find one of the "Lost Gods", Kwll, imprisoned there. Corum offers Kwll back his hand, which will free him, in return for help against Mabelode. Freed, Kwll disowns any bargain - he and his brother are above all including the law of the balance - but is persuaded to help. Taking them directly to Mabelode, Kwll destroys the King of Swords and his Dukes. In the end, Kwll is reunited with Rhynn, who was the wading god all this time. Together, they have also destroyed the Lords of Law, leaving humanity to shape its own destinies.

== Reception ==
Dave Langford reviewed The Swords Trilogy for White Dwarf #81, and stated that "Michael Moorcock's peculiar brand of sword-and-sorcery is also lightweight, but with above-normal inventiveness, a touch of surrealism, and a good line in doomed Byronic heroes".

== Reviews ==
- Review by Terry Broome (1986) in Vector 134
- Review by Ron Gemmell (1988) in Paperback Inferno, #70
- Review by Chris Hart (1993) in Vector 172
- Review by Colin Steele (1993) in SF Commentary, #73/74/75
- Review by uncredited (2002) in Vector 225
- Review by Anthony Perconti (2018) in Swords and Sorcery Magazine, Issue 82, December 2018
