= The Eternal Champion (novel) =

1970 fantasy novel by Michael Moorcock

- Cover of the first edition
- Author: Michael Moorcock
- Cover artist: Frank Frazetta
- Language: English
- Series: Erekosë
- Genre: Fantasy novel
- Publisher: Dell Books
- Publication date: 1970
- Publication place: United Kingdom
- Media type: Print (Paperback)
- Pages: 484 pp
- ISBN: 0-425-09562-2
- OCLC: 15239889
- Followed by: Phoenix in Obsidian

The Eternal Champion is a fantasy novel by Michael Moorcock that introduces the hero known as both John Daker and Erekosë. Originally written in the late 1950s, it constitutes the first novel of Moorcock's sprawling Eternal Champion series. The tale was first published in 1962 as a magazine novella. Moorcock expanded the novella to novel length for publication in 1970. He revised the text for its 1978 publication. Along with expanding the original story, the novel makes some minor changes to narration and scenes, and also includes references to other short stories by Moorcock. The Eternal Champion is the first in a trilogy of novels known as the Erekosë series (though the lead character adopts other identities in subsequent novels). The sequel novels are Phoenix in Obsidian (1970; published in the US as The Silver Warriors), and The Dragon in the Sword (1987).

In the story, John Daker, an ordinary 20th century middle-class black man, is pulled through time and space to the tomb of Erekosë, a long-dead hero of a version of Earth that may be the distant past or distant future. Daker realizes he is the reincarnation of the warrior Erekosë and is now being called to assume that identity again by the people he once served. Daker also sees memories of other lives he has lived or will live and realizes he is one of many incarnations of the Eternal Champion, a key figure in the mythology of Michael Moorcock's multiverse. The Eternal Champion is often called to restore or maintain the multiverse's balance between the cosmic forces of Law and Chaos. With his memories of Daker's life and family quickly dimming, the warrior accepts his identity as Erekosë, and armed with a radioactive sword called Kanajana, joins a great war between humans and an alien race, the Eldren. Throughout the novel, he is skeptical about the just nature of the war he fights and feels conflicted about his duty to humanity in contrast to his duty as an Eternal Champion who may need to defy humanity. He is also occasionally tormented by the lingering memories and principles of his 20th century life, as well as glimpses of his other lives under a multiplicity of names.

Many incarnations of Moorcock's Eternal Champion are unaware they serve this role and/or have no memories of their other lives. Daker/Erekosë stands apart by being able to remember aspects of his multiple lives. While his books were not as popular as those featuring some of Moorcock's other characters, Erekosë is frequently mentioned in other stories of the author's multiverse. Along with his own novels, the character has appeared in crossover stories involving other Eternal Champion incarnations. His radioactive, poisonous sword echoes the vampiric, living sword Stormbringer wielded by the other aspect of the Eternal Champion called Elric.

== Plot summary ==
The Eternal Champion is narrated by John Daker, an inhabitant of 20th century Earth. Daker has a wife and child whom he loves but no further information is given. He has an occupation that does not interest him and feels unfulfilled in life. One winter night, while thinking of morality and "the futility of human existence", Daker hears a voice calling him to action in order to protect humanity. The voice calls him Erekosë. Daker hears the voice on several other occasions and makes an effort to hear it better and answer its call, though also seems uncertain he has a choice to ignore it. Finally, his spirit moves through time and space and he realizes he is the Eternal Champion, a being who is reborn time and again throughout the multiverse. Throughout their lives, the Eternal Champion is called to maintain or restore the balance between the cosmic forces of Chaos and Law when needed. While many Eternal Champions only remember their current life and existence, Daker's trip through time and space reveals scattered memories from many other incarnations, such as Erekosë and Michael Moorcock's other characters such as Elric, Prince Corum, Dorian Hawkmoon, Jerry Cornelius, the Rose, and members of the family Von Bek.

Daker manifests on another version of Earth (he is not certain if it's the distant past or distant future), in the tomb of Erekosë, a long dead warrior who was prophesied to return when needed. Daker now inhabits a body resembling Erekosë's (whose face reminds him of his own). Daker knows Erekosë was a past life of his and understands he has been called to resume that particular role again. After just a few hours, he remarks that his memory of being John Daker is dimming while his knowledge of Erekosë's life and way of thinking becomes stronger. Although he is unsure how all this has happened, he accepts that this is his life and role now. He even laughs happily when he is reunited with Kanajana, the radioactive sword of Erekosë that poisons everyone except him when it is unsheathed.

Erekosë learns that he is in the fortress city of Necranal, the capital of human society. Led by King Rigenos, the city is at war with the Eldren race of the Southern continents. King Rigenos summoned Erekosë, hoping the warrior will defeat the Eldren completely. Erekosë attempts to understand the cause of the war and questions why Necranal attacked the Eldren for expanding into territory already abandoned by humanity. But the people of Necranal insist that the Eldren are monsters and the expansion of their empire is an inherent threat to humanity. Erekosë suspects humanity is engaged in a war motivated by racial bigotry towards the Eldren, but feels that as a human himself he must be loyal to Necranal for now. He befriends and subsequently falls in love with Iolinda, daughter of Rigenos, and the two become secretly engaged.

Joining the forces of Necral in naval battle, Erekosë is appalled by the violence and ruthlessness of the human soldiers, particularly when they later attack children and non-combatants. The soldiers of Necral capture Ermizahd, the sister of the Eldren Prince Arjavh. During the journey back to Necranal, Erekosë watches over Ermizahd, admiring her strength and sympathizing with her suffering. Later, Prince Arjavh brings an Eldren force to Necranal to rescue his sister.

After a battle between the Eldren and the humans, Erekosë is taken prisoner by Arjavh, who reveals this world was originally inhabited only by Eldren. After the arrival of humans, a war between the races nearly destroyed the planet. The Eldren hid away their most dangerous weapons, vowing never to use them again. The humans made no such vow but over time forgot how to build certain technology. Now sympathizing with the Eldren, Erekosë is sent back to Necranal and Ermizahd escapes. Realizing Erekosë sympathizes with the Eldren, and suspicious of his feelings for Ermizahd, Princess Iolinda deems him a traitor to be executed. To quell the anger of his betrothed, and hoping this will stop the war the humans insist on having, Erekosë vows to help kill all Eldren.

"You will spare none?"
"None! None! I want it to be over. And the only way I can finish it is to kill them all. Then it will be over—only then!"
"Including Prince Arjavh and his sister?"
"Including them!"
"You swear this? You swear it?"
"I swear it. And when the last Eldren dies, when the whole world is ours, then I will bring it to you and we shall be married".

The war continues for a year, during which Erekosë compromises his morals and suppresses his dreams and memories of other lives as the Eternal Champion. Eventually, the last Eldren outpost is Loos Ptokai. The night before the outpost comes under siege, Prince Arjavh allows Erekosë to visit Ermizahd, as the two love each other. Falling asleep in Loos Ptokai, he dreams again about being the Eternal Champion but now realises all of humanity is often trapped in eternal struggle. Deciding to make one last attempt at peace rather than genocide, Erekosë returns with his army to Necranal. Princess Iolinda commands he be taken prisoner, but he escapes to Loos Ptokai. Soon, the humans attack the outpost. At first, the Eldren still refuse to use their ancient war machines, but Erekosë convinces Arjavh that not doing so will mean the Eldren will be completely wiped out. Using the ancient technology, Erekosë destroys the army of Necranal, ending the war.

After destroying the human army, he proceeds to kill every human being on the planet. Then he returns to Loos Ptokai, marries Ermizhad, and knows peace, at least for a time.
