= The Runestaff =

1969 fantasy novel by Michael Moorcock

- Cover of the first edition, published as The Secret of the Runestaff.
- Author: Michael Moorcock
- Original title: The Secret of the Runestaff
- Cover artist: Jack Faragasso
- Language: English
- Series: The History of the Runestaff
- Genre: Fantasy
- Publisher: Lancer Books
- Publication date: 1969
- Publication place: United States
- Media type: Print (paperback)
- Pages: 192
- ISBN: 0-583-11499-7 (reprint)
- OCLC: 219817892
- Preceded by: The Sword of the Dawn
- Followed by: Count Brass

The Runestaff is a novel by British author Michael Moorcock, first published in 1969 under the title The Secret of the Runestaff.

The novel is the fourth in Moorcock's four book The History of the Runestaff series, and the narrative follows on immediately from the preceding novel The Sword of the Dawn.

== Plot summary ==
=== Book One ===
Baron Meliadus is summoned to an audience with King-Emperor Huon, where he is threatened with dismissal if he does not learn the means of the escape of the Asiacommunista emissaries. Meanwhile, Countess Flana wonders at the fate of Hawkmoon and her lover D'Averc.

Hawkmoon attempts to break free from his destiny by sailing to Europe, but finds his way blocked by numerous sea creatures which drive their ship to crash upon an island. On the island Hawkmoon and D'Averc meet the Warrior in Jet and Gold's brother Orland Fank, who gives them a boat to continue on their original journey to the city of Dnark. Orland informs Hawkmoon that the inhabitants of Castle Brass are safe, though Elvereza Tozer has escaped. Orland stays with Hawkmoon's crew to repair their ship, while Hawkmoon and D'Averc depart for Dnark.

Hawkmoon and D'Averc arrive back in Amarehk and find themselves in a strange city of glowing organic buildings. There they meet a child called Jehamia Cohnahlias who confirms that this is the city of Dnark – the home of the mythical Runestaff and inhabited by the ghostly forms of the Great Good Ones. There they also meet Count Shenegar Trott, who claims to be visiting as a peaceful emissary of King-Emperor Huon.

The next day Shenegar Trott leads an army to capture Dnark, threatening to kill Jehamia Cohnahlias if Hawkmoon tries to stop him claiming the Runestaff. Hawkmoon and D'Averc are rescued from Trott's forces by the Great Good Ones, who transport them to the location of the Runestaff. There they confront Shenegar Trott and find themselves joined by Orland Fank and the Warrior in Jet and Gold. Jehamia Cohnahlias frees himself from Trott's grasp, revealing himself as the spirit of the Runestaff, into which he disappears. Hawkmoon summons the Legion of the Dawn and they begin attacking Trott's forces, but Hawkmoon is knocked out in the fight and as he loses consciousness the Legion disappears. By the time he recovers consciousness and the Legion returns The Warrior in Jet and Gold has been killed. Hawkmoon kills Shenegar Trott and his army is defeated by the Legion of the Dawn. Jehamia Cohnahlias instructs Hawkmoon to take the Runestaff to Europe and decide the battle between himself and Meliadus once and for all.

=== Book Two ===
Baron Meliadus conspires with Countess Flana to overthrow King-Emperor Huon and enthrone Flana as Empress. Huon orders Meliadus's loyalty tested on the Mentality Machine but Baron Kalan agrees to doctor the results. Meliadus visits Taragorm who informs him of the return of Elvereza Tozer after his escape from Castle Brass, and that he will soon have the means to return Castle Brass to this dimension. King-Emperor Huon summons Meliadus and sends him on a mission to Amarehk to learn of Shenegar Trott's fate. Meliadus summons the various captains of his assembled army and convinces them to aid him in treason.

Hawkmoon and D'Averc are transported back to Castle Brass by the Great Good Ones, where Yisselda tells Hawkmoon she is to bear him a child.

Baron Meliadus leads his fleet back up towards Londra and begins his assault on Huon's forces. Meliadus meets Taragorm who tells him his device is now ready to transport Castle Brass back into this dimension. King-Emperor Huon's forces are pressed back towards the palace, and Huon dispatches a messenger by ornithopter to summon aid from his generals in Europe.

=== Book Three ===
Taragorm uses his sonic device to shatter the crystal device that is keeping Castle Brass in another dimension, and the castle returns to the destroyed Kamarg. In a nearby village Hawkmoon finds that the Dark Empire army has left, but have destroyed the village behind them. Orland Fank appears and gives Hawkmoon and company a collection of mirrored helmets to be worn by the leaders of the Kamarg: Hawkmoon, Count Brass, D'Averc, Oladahn, Bowgentle, and Yisselda.

Baron Meliadus's forces are swelled by those of Adaz Promp as he joins forces. Kalan creates a war machine to breach the walls of the palace, but after it does so it explodes, killing Taragorm in the process. Meliadus breaches the throne room and kills King-Emperor Huon, but suffers temporary blindness from the flash of Huon's shattered throne globe.

Hawkmoon and his army cross into Granbretan and defeat the awaiting Dark Empire army, forcing Meliadus to flee back to Londra by ornithopter. Kalan works on a device to reactivate the Black Jewel embedded in Hawkmoon's skull, and Hawkmoon begins to feel the effects, though the Red Amulet holds its full power at bay.

Hawkmoon and his army attack Londra and Oladahn, Count Brass, Bowgentle, and D'Averc are all killed. Hawkmoon kills Baron Meliadus though his army is overrun by the Dark Empire forces. Overwhelmed with grief at D'Averc's death Flana stops the fighting and orders Kalan to remove the Black Jewel from Hawkmoon's head. Flana vows to make amends for Granbretan's evil and Orland Fank takes the Runestaff, the Red Amulet, and the Sword of the Dawn into safekeeping, till Hawkmoon should need them again.
