= The Retreat from Liberty =

1983 book by Michael Moorcock

The Retreat from Liberty: The Erosion of Democracy in Today's Britain is a book by Michael Moorcock published in 1983.

== Contents ==
The Retreat from Liberty: The Erosion of Democracy in Today's Britain is a 95-page political pamphlet written to convince people to each accept their own personal freedom and all responsibilities that come with it.

== Reception ==
Dave Pringle reviewed The Retreat from Liberty: The Erosion of Democracy in Today's Britain for Imagine magazine, and stated that "This booklet is a must for all Moorcock fans, but I hope it is read by a much wider audience besides."
