= The Laughter of Carthage =

1984 novel by Michael Moorcock

- Dust-jacket from the first edition.
- Author: Michael Moorcock
- Language: English
- Series: Pyat Quartet
- Genre: Literary Fiction
- Publisher: Secker & Warburg
- Publication date: 1984
- Publication place: United Kingdom
- Media type: Print (hardback)
- Pages: 602 pp
- ISBN: 0-436-28460-X
- OCLC: 59237630
- Preceded by: Byzantium Endures
- Followed by: Jerusalem Commands

The Laughter of Carthage is a historical fiction novel by English author Michael Moorcock published by Secker & Warburg in 1984. It is the second in the Pyat Quartet tetralogy, preceded by Byzantium Endures and followed by Jerusalem Commands. It was written in tandem, one during the day, and one at night, with the second novel in the Von Bek series, The City in the Autumn Stars.

== Reception ==
Kirkus Reviews criticized the novel, saying: "...though Moorcock may want all the ugly rhetoric to be read as the ravings of a self-deluding liar and knave, the ironies--e.g., Pyat's own secret Jewishness--aren't as clear here as they were in Byzantium Endures. So this 600-page novel, for all its scene-by-scene skill, soon becomes a cold, tedious exercise--short on genuine character or charm, basically shapeless, faintly unpleasant".
