= Byzantium Endures =

1981 novel by Michael Moorcock

- Dust-jacket from the first edition.
- Author: Michael Moorcock
- Language: English
- Series: Pyat Quartet
- Genre: Literary fiction
- Publisher: Secker & Warburg
- Publication date: 29 June 1981
- Publication place: United Kingdom
- Media type: Print (hardback)
- Pages: 404 pp
- ISBN: 0-436-28458-8
- OCLC: 7691573
- Followed by: The Laughter of Carthage

Byzantium Endures is a historical fiction novel by English author Michael Moorcock published by Secker & Warburg in 1981. It is the first in the Pyat Quartet tetralogy, and is followed by The Laughter of Carthage.

== Plot summary ==
The book is written in the first person from the point of view of unreliable narrator Maxim Arturovitch Pyatnitski, whose posthumous notes Moorcock claims to have transcribed. Pyat, as he is also known, describes in the novel his adventures in Tsarist then Revolutionary Russia. Born on 1 January 1900 in Kiev, Pyat dreams from early on of becoming a great inventor and engineer.

His widowed mother, lacking any means to support his higher education, sends him at age 16 to a relative in Odessa, where Pyat is introduced to bohemian life, cocaine and sexual adventures. Making a good impression on his relative, he secures a position at a technical university in St. Petersburg. After having failed to obtain a degree, he returns to Kiev, where he manages to profit from his knowledge of machinery and runs a successful repair enterprise.

The revolutionary and post-revolutionary civil war bring him again to Odessa; on the way, he aligns with whatever group is in power. Finally, he manages to escape by ship to western Europe. Throughout all his wanderings, Pyat does not pass over any opportunity for self-aggrandisement, despite being a genuinely despicable character. The character appears to have been addicted to cocaine and sex. He is also obsessively antisemitic despite being Jewish himself.

== Reception ==
Frederic Morton in his review of the novel for The New York Times commented that "the book has two important virtues, and they conflict. Russia's great cities, before and during the Revolution, come alive in judicious renderings of sights and sounds, gestures and moods. The image works, and there are many others of like effectiveness. But these images are the product of a balanced literary sensibility attuned to moral ironies and to ethical counterpoint. As such they work against rather than with the book's major element: Pyat's other, more dominant voice, which mesmerizes just because it is so authentically unbalanced in its egotism, so dynamic in its lopsidedness, so amoral in its elan, so gorgeously maniacal. If Mr. Moorcock had been able to resolve the dissonance, he would have come close to a masterpiece". His conclusion is that "Byzantium Endures is often masterly - and never more so, strangely enough, than when Pyat fantasticates away on the nature of divinity. The machines he invents may be altogether chimerical, but his private theology intriguingly underpins his ravings".

Paul West writing for The Washington Post noted: "A game of mirrors is going on here, a game whose rules extend beyond the immediate concerns of Byzantium Endures...The reader has to work out whether or not, granted the constraint of editing, the entire novel should have been cast in the mode of the preface, with Pyat given not raw and unmediated, but planted in the living tissue of authorial speculation. I wonder, because Moorcock as himself, or impersonating himself, is a subtler teller than Moorcock impersonating Pyat, who limps and drones and fumbles, enlarging what an expert novelist would have trimmed, and vice versa. If the gain is a greater realism, the loss is in technique; a loss which perhaps the other three volumes will justify".

Kirkus Reviews called Moorcock's attempts "a bravura impersonation: modern Russian history laid out with the care and lavishness of a good smorgasbord. And the resulting novel is indeed glassy, stylish, marvelously well-researched--at its best in the evocation of Russian train-travel circa 1920. But Max himself never comes to life, never functions as anything more than an emblem. So this grand-scale panorama, though historically vivid (it's a fascinating era), lacks a center--and, as one watches the events and scenery move by, the effect is most often that of an empty, cold construction".

Newcity said: "Byzantium Endures is in essence two novels, in the Swiftian tradition of satire. On one level, it is the story of Pyat's pursuit of recognition in the mad modern world of the twentieth century. But reading between the lines, the unconscious evils of Pyat's ignorance reveal dark truths about himself as both a character, and as an allegorical stand-in for Western civilization’s compliance with the ultimate culmination of millennia of antisemitism. It is a comic novel, though not a comedic one, utilizing the tropes and techniques of both modern farce and classical Commedia dell'Arte".
