= The Mad God's Amulet =

1968 novel by Michael Moorcock

- First edition, published as Sorcerer's Amulet
- Author: Michael Moorcock
- Original title: Sorcerer's Amulet
- Cover artist: Jeff Jones
- Language: English
- Series: The History of the Runestaff
- Genre: Fantasy
- Publisher: Lancer Books
- Publication date: 1968
- Publication place: United States
- Media type: Print (paperback)
- Pages: 190
- ISBN: 0-447-73707-4
- Preceded by: The Jewel in the Skull
- Followed by: The Sword of the Dawn

The Mad God's Amulet is a fantasy novel by English writer Michael Moorcock, first published in 1968 as Sorcerer's Amulet. The novel is the second in the four-volume The History of the Runestaff.

The events in this novel take place immediately after the preceding volume, The Jewel in the Skull.

== Plot summary ==
=== Book One ===
Heading West back to the Kamarg, Dorian Hawkmoon and Oladahn find themselves in the deserted city of Soryandum. Oladahn disappears while out hunting and on seeking him Hawkmoon sees an ornithopter of the Dark Empire of Granbretan.

Oladahn is captured by forces of the Dark Empire, led by renegade Frenchman Huillam d'Averc, but inexplicably survives what should be a fatal fall when he escapes by throwing himself from the top of a tower. Hawkmoon and Oladahn battle the Dark Empire warriors but are ultimately overcome by weight of numbers.

Hawkmoon and Oladahn are imprisoned awaiting an ornithopter to transport them to Sicilia. Oladahn reveals that he was rescued from his fall by ghosts, and these wraiths re-appear and free the pair. The wraiths are the inhabitants of Soryandum, transformed by their own science so that they exist in another dimension. D'Averc is planning to raze Soryandum which would destroy the wraiths, so they call on Hawkmoon to aid them by recovering a pair of old Soryandum machines. When they transcended this dimension the wraiths had the machines hidden and guarded by a mechanical beast which Hawkmoon will have to defeat.

Hawkmoon and Oladahn find the machine store and defeat the mechanical beast by blinding it. They recover the two machines but the mechanical beast follows after them.

Hawkmoon and Oladahn return the machines to the wraiths, who use one to shift the entire city of Soryandum to another dimension, giving the other machine to Hawkmoon for his own use. Meanwhile, the forces of the Dark Empire are attacked by the machine beast and Hawkmoon and Oladahn make their escape. The pair continue their journey, next stopping at the town of Birachek.

Later Hawkmoon and Oladahn secure passage from Captain Mouso on The Smiling Girl, a vessel heading for Crimia. During the journey they pick up the shipwrecked D'Averc and Hawkmoon intends to keep him as a hostage. The Smiling Girl then finds herself under attack from a pirate ship belonging to the Muskovian Cult of the Mad God.

During the attack Hawkmoon, Oladahn and D'Averc manage to capture the ship belonging to the Cult of the Mad God. Amongst the looted treasure in the hold Hawkmoon finds the engagement ring he gave to Yisselda and fears for her safety. The trio manage to take one of the cultists captive, and learn that they are innocent sailors who are drugged to commit acts of violent piracy.

Hawkmoon, Oladahn and D'Averc lay in wait to capture the cultist's man Captain Shagarov, and he informs them that any captured females would have been taken to the Mad God himself. Shagarov is executed by Hawkmoon and the pirate ship set alight, while the trio escape on a skiff and head towards Ukrania and the Mad God.

=== Book Two ===
Hawkmoon, Oladahn, and D'Averc reach the shore and find the Warrior in Jet and Gold awaiting them. Once again the Warrior informs Hawkmoon that he is a servant of the Runestaff, and that as well as saving the kidnapped Yisselda he must also recover a Red Amulet – an artefact linked to the Runestaff which bestows power on its servants but madness to others.

Hawkmoon, Oladahn, D'Averc, and the Warrior in Jet and Gold head deeper into Ukrania, along the way crossing the mysterious Throbbing Bridge and encountering signs of the Dark Empire's forces. They reach the Mad God's Castle and defeat a group of warrior women, but elsewhere the castle is already filled with corpses.

Hawkmoon enters the castle and confronts the Mad God, Stalnikov, who sets a hypnotised Yisselda to attacking him. On the point of defeat Stalnikov releases Yisselda from his sway, but Hawkmoon attacks and kills him anyway.

Yisselda informs Hawkmoon that Von Villach has been killed by Dark Empire forces and Count Brass is gravely ill. The Mad God's castle is stormed by Granbretan troops and when they brand D'Averc a traitor he elects to join forces with Hawkmoon. The Warrior in Jet and Gold persuades Hawkmoon to wear the Red Amulet, saying it is his only chance to escape the castle.

Aided by the power of the Red Amulet Hawkmoon fights his way out of the Mad God's hall. In the castle courtyard the group are attacked by more Dark Empire warriors, but Hawkmoon uses the Red Amulet to command the Mad God's remaining warrior women to attack them.

Hawkmoon uses the power of the Red Amulet to command the Mad God's mutant war-jaguars and escapes the castle along with Yisselda, Oladahn, and D'Averc. Along the way however they become separated from the Warrior in Jet and Gold who was attempting to recover the mechanical device Hawkmoon had been given by the wraiths of Soryandum.

The group travel on to the mountains of Carpathia, where they are attacked by Dark Empire forces and are forced to set their war-jaguars free in the battle. Arriving in the town of Zorvanemi they go undercover as a party of holy men, but after killing a number of Dark Empire troops in a tavern fight they decide to don their armour and masquerade as warriors of Granbretan under D'Averc's leadership.

The group ride further into Shekia, and join a camp of Dark Empire forces massed outside the city of Bradichla. D'Averc leaves the group and betrays them leading to their capture.

Hawkmoon, Yisselda, and Oladahn are brought before Baron Meliadus, who survived the battle of Hamadan. He orders the three bound in chains and vows to take them back to Granbretan, stopping first on the way to witness the fall of the Kamarg.

Arriving at the Kamarg, Baron Meliadus orders his forces to begin the final assault. Overnight D'Averc reveals his true loyalties by drugging the guards and releasing Hawkmoon, Yisselda, and Oladahn. The group ride through the Dark Empire forces to the Kamarg though D'Averc is wounded in the process. Arriving at Castle Brass the sight of the returned Yisselda and Hawkmoon is enough to cure Count Brass of the sickness of spirit that has plagued him, and together with Hawkmoon he rushes to lead his forces in the defence of the Kamarg. On leaving Castle Brass, however, they witness the destruction of the last of their war towers with the Kamarg seemingly about to fall.

Aided by the power of the Red Amulet Hawkmoon helps drive the Dark Empire forces back to the borders of the Kamarg. The Kamarg's forces regroup at Castle Brass and the Dark Empire forces begin a siege. The Warrior in Jet and Gold reappears at Castle Brass and delivers to Hawkmoon the dimension warping device of the people of Soryandum.

The Dark Empire forces the beginning of their final assault on Castle Brass but the Warrior in Jet and Gold activates the Soryandum machine and shifts the castle into another dimension. The people of the Kamarg are safe for now, but Baron Meliadus vows to learn of a way to follow them, and Hawkmoon knows that he must return to do battle again.
