= The Jewel in the Skull =

1967 fantasy novel by Michael Moorcock

- First edition
- Author: Michael Moorcock
- Cover artist: Gray Morrow
- Language: English
- Series: The History of the Runestaff
- Genre: Fantasy
- Publisher: Lancer Books
- Publication date: 1967
- Publication place: United States
- Media type: Print (paperback)
- Pages: 175
- Followed by: The Mad God's Amulet

The Jewel in the Skull is a fantasy novel by English writer Michael Moorcock, first published in 1967. The novel is the first in the four volume The History of the Runestaff.

== Plot summary ==
The novel is set at some indeterminate time in a post-nuclear holocaust future, where science and sorcery co-exist and the Dark Empire of Granbretan (Great Britain) is expanding across Europe.

=== Book one ===
Count Brass, Lord Guardian of the Kamarg (a territory that had once been a part of a nation called France), inspects his territories. On his return journey to his castle at Aigues-Mortes he is attacked by a 'baragoon' – a swamp monster created from transformed slaves by the previous Lord Guardian – and kills it.

Count Brass arrives at Castle Brass in Aigues-Mortes and is welcomed by his daughter Yisselda and philosopher-poet friend Bowgentle. Bowgentle argues that the evil of Granbretan should be fought, but Count Brass believes that a united Europe will ultimately know peace.

Brass, Yisselda, Bowgentle and the Count's chief lieutenant von Villach attend the opening of the Great Festival, where Count Brass enters the bullring to save the life of the injured bullfighter Mahtan Just. Back at the castle Count Brass receives an emissary from Granbretan – Baron Meliadus – who attempts in vain to persuade him to give up his knowledge of the various courts of Europe.

Baron Meliadus begins to court Yisselda, but she refuses to elope with him knowing that her father would not agree to their marriage. Meliadus attempts to kidnap her, wounding Bowgentle in the attempt, but is defeated by Count Brass and expelled from Kamarg. Meliadus swears an oath on the legendary Runestaff to gain power over Count Brass, gain Yisselda and destroy the Kamarg.

=== Book two ===
In the German province of Köln a rebellion against the Dark Empire led by Duke Dorian Hawkmoon is put down, and the captured Hawkmoon is brought to the Granbretan capital Londra as a prisoner.

Hawkmoon is kept in luxurious captivity and offered a bargain for his life and freedom by Baron Meliadus. First to judge his suitability he is tested on the mentality machine by Baron Kalan, and judged sane. Meliadus offers him freedom for himself and Köln if he travels to Kamarg and kidnaps Yisselda from Count Brass: Hawkmoon agrees to the bargain.

To ensure Hawkmoon's loyalty a Black Jewel is inserted in his forehead: this jewel will relay Hawkmoon's sight back to Londra, and will eat his brain should Hawkmoon attempt treachery. Before he departs Hawkmoon is granted an audience with the immortal King-Emperor of Granbretan.

The plan is that Hawkmoon shall journey to Kamarg dressed as Meliadus, with the story that he drugged him and thus secured passage undetected. Thus Hawkmoon travels from Granbretan across the Silver Bridge to the Crystal City of Parye, Lyon, Valence and finally arrives at Castle Brass. Along the way he catches a glimpse of a mysterious Warrior in Jet and Gold.

Count Brass realises the nature of the Black Jewel and by physical and sorcerous means manages to capture the life force of the jewel, rendering it safe. The reprieve is only temporary, but Brass informs Hawkmoon that a sorcerer from the East called Malagigi of Hamadan may possess the power to remove the jewel if Hawkmoon can find him in time.

Led by Baron Meliadus the army of Granbretan advances on the Kamarg, harried by sniping attacks led by Hawkmoon. At the battle of the Kamarg the Granbretan army is defeated by the exotic war towers of Count Brass and Meliadus flees. Following the battle Yisselda pledges her love to Hawkmoon and persuades him to seek the sorcerer Malagigi to free himself from the Black Jewel.

=== Book three ===
Hawkmoon rides one of Count Brass's giant flamingos towards the East, but is accidentally shot down by a furry midget crossbreed of a human/mountain giant pairing named Oladahn. Hawkmoon and Oladahn are attacked by a band of brigands but manage to steal two of their goats and ride off.

A month later Hawkmoon and Oladahn come upon the freak-show caravan of 900-year-old sorcerer Agonosvos. As an ex-inhabitant of Köln Hawkmoon expects Agonosvos to show loyalty to his duke, but instead Agonsovos kidnaps Hawkmoon to sell him to Baron Meliadus. Hawkmoon is rescued by Oladahn and the pair flee from Agonosvos, who swears vengeance upon them.

Hawkmoon and Oladahn take a ship to Turkia, narrowly avoiding ships from the Dark Empire's warfleet, before heading further into Persia. A month later the pair are attacked by a group of 20 Granbretan warriors but are rescued by the mysterious Warrior in Jet and Gold, who accompanies them towards Hamadan.

Arriving in Hamadan they find that ruler Queen Frawbra has been ousted by her brother Nahak in league with the forces of the Dark Empire. Hawkmoon finds sorcerer Malagigi but he refuses to help him and, spotting his enemy Baron Meliadus, Hawkmoon flees the city. Hawkmoon persuades Queen Frawbra and her followers to lead an assault to re-take the city, and together with Oladahn and the Warrior in Jet and Gold they attack Hamadan.

During the battle Hawkmoon finds himself pitched against Baron Meliadus, and the two fight till they both collapse. Meliadus is later presumed dead, though his body is nowhere to be found. Queen Frawbra's forces succeed in recapturing the city with Frawbra killing her brother Nahak. Malagigi is finally persuaded to help Hawkmoon and succeeds in drawing out the life in the Black Jewel, though Hawkmoon elects to continue to wear the inactive jewel in his forehead as a symbol of hatred. The Warrior in Jet and Gold informs Hawkmoon that he is a servant of the Runestaff, though Hawkmoon dismisses this as a legend. Queen Frawbra offers marriage to Hawkmoon but he refuses and, accompanied by Oladahn, begins the return journey to Kamarg and Yisselda.
