= Pyat Quartet =

Tetralogy of novels by Michael Moorcock

- Byzantium Endures (1981); The Laughter of Carthage (1984); Jerusalem Commands (1992); The Vengeance of Rome (2006)
- Author: Michael Moorcock
- Country: United Kingdom
- Language: English
- Genre: Historical fiction
- Publisher: Secker & Warburg; Jonathan Cape
- Published: 1981–2006
- Media type: Print (hardcover and paperback)
- No. of books: 4

The Pyat Quartet, also known as Between the Wars, is a tetralogy of historical fiction novels by English author Michael Moorcock comprising Byzantium Endures, The Laughter of Carthage, Jerusalem Commands and The Vengeance of Rome published from 1981 to 2006.

== Main character ==
The novels are presented as if narrated to Moorcock by (the fictional character) Colonel Pyat or Maxim Arturovitch Pyatnitski (born on 1 January 1900 in Kiev), a classic unreliable narrator and antihero who is another incarnation of Moorcock's "Eternal Champion". Pyat is an anti-semitic Jew who believes in an anti-Christian, anti-Muslim new world order brought about by a revived Roman Empire. Charles Shaar Murray in The Independent calls Pyat "the most unreliable narrator in the fiction of the past half-century; the dustbin of history on legs. A fanatical Slav nationalist forever ranting of the glories of Byzantium and its need for unceasing vigilance against the malign forces of Carthage (by which he means Jews, Muslims and all of Africa), a man for whom the distinction between lying and self-delusion has long since eroded, an eternal betrayer...Pyat is so consistent, so much of a piece, so relentless in his repulsiveness, that the reader ends up reluctantly saluting his indefatigability". Newcity stated about Pyat: "For all his selfishness, ignorance and hate, there is a charismatic energy to the man that is found in all the truly terrible ideologues in history. Reflected in Pyat, we see not the man who sent millions to the gas chamber, but the millions who let him under the delusional guise of profit and progress".

== Origin ==
Moorcock stated that he was "interested in understanding the enemy as it were and what idealism informs the reactionary". He said that he wanted to get to the roots of the Holocaust in the Pyat books as he was afraid it might happen again and so felt that he was morally obliged to write the books. He mentioned that the Pyat novels are how he sees the world as having been brought to most of its worst crises through notions of improvability and that he also used his friend and fellow author Arthur C. Clarke’s notions, with which he profoundly disagreed, as a springboard for the Pyat quartet. Moorcock has said that the Pyat Quartet is the work he is proudest of, a series of novels attempting to unravel the racism that allowed the Holocaust to happen.

== Reception ==
D.J. Taylor in The Guardian calls the series a "historical picaresque on the grand scale, a vast and intermittently rambling chronicle of tall tales, brief encounters and expert twitches on the thread of destiny". In his extensive review of the quartet, John Clute commented: "The best way to grasp the Pyat Quartet as a whole has been, for me, to think of it as a symphony. Byzantium Endures, the first movement, which covers the first 20 years of the century, is in sonata form: themes are introduced, contrasted, developed, reprised, concluded on a rising pitch. The Laughter of Carthage (1984), which proceeds stately through the early 1920s from France to America, is the slow movement, allowing us to take breath and even, for several dozen pages at a stretch, to enjoy Pyat as he engages in what might almost be thought of as shenanigans as he becomes an exceedingly minor star in some Hollywood westerns; but his betrayals of others (which he invariably understands as their betrayals not only of him but of Western civilization) do continue, like insertions of a Weimar trio into the Korngold schmaltz. Jerusalem Commands (1992), the weakest of the four volumes, is a scherzo: a fast late 1920s patter through Saharan Africa, laced with sadomasochism and sand in the mouth, but somehow running to keep still. It is The Vengeance of Rome which surprises...(last movements are always problematical). I was expecting something like a "Dies irae" or, even more interestingly, an invert "Ode to Joy": a long crescendo of a movement which, after sorting the three previous volumes and finding them lacking in final punch, built to a 1930s/1940s climax far more shattering than the solarization which changes Elric into Jerry Cornelius. I was expecting an apotheosis. But the book is nothing like that at all. It is wiser than climax (Pyat is too pockmarked with lies to give us an apotheosis). Vengeance is a rondo".
