= Jerusalem Commands =

1992 novel by Michael Moorcock

- Dust-jacket from the first edition.
- Author: Michael Moorcock
- Cover artist: Andrew Herniak
- Language: English
- Series: Pyat Quartet
- Genre: Literary fiction
- Publisher: Jonathan Cape
- Publication date: 1992
- Publication place: United Kingdom
- Media type: Print (hardback)
- Pages: 577 pp
- ISBN: 0-224-03074-4
- OCLC: 28547555
- Dewey Decimal: 823/.914 20
- LC Class: PR6063.O59 J47 1992
- Preceded by: The Laughter of Carthage
- Followed by: The Vengeance of Rome

Jerusalem Commands is a historical fiction novel by English author Michael Moorcock published by Jonathan Cape in 1992. It is the third in the Pyat Quartet tetralogy, preceded by The Laughter of Carthage and followed by The Vengeance of Rome. The novel takes place between World War I and World War II, and in it, Colonel Pyat travels from Hollywood to Casablanca, to Alexandria and travels across the Sahara.
