= The Sword of the Dawn =

1968 novel by Michael Moorcock

- Cover of the first edition.
- Author: Michael Moorcock
- Cover artist: Jack Faragasso
- Language: English
- Series: The History of the Runestaff
- Genre: Fantasy
- Publisher: Lancer Books
- Publication date: 1968
- Publication place: United States
- Media type: Print (paperback)
- Pages: 191
- ISBN: 0-88677-173-0 (later paperback printing)
- OCLC: 20077172
- Preceded by: The Mad God's Amulet
- Followed by: The Runestaff

The Sword of the Dawn is a fantasy novel by British author Michael Moorcock, first published in 1968.

The novel is the third in Moorcock's four book The History of the Runestaff series, and the narrative follows on immediately from the preceding novel The Mad God's Amulet.

== Plot summary ==
=== Book One ===
The warriors of the Dark Empire of Granbretan have succeeded in conquering all of Europe, though the vanished Castle Brass still eludes Baron Meliadus. Summoned by Count Shenegar Trott, Baron Meliadus heads back to Granbretan to report to King-Emperor Huon.

While riding in the alternate plane that Castle Brass has been shifted to, Dorian Hawkmoon encounters a swordsman called Elvereza Tozer.

Hawkmoon takes Tozer prisoner and takes him back to Castle Brass. Under questioning Elvereza Tozer is revealed as a famous disgraced Granbretan playwright who hoped to curry favour with the Dark Empire by travelling to Castle Brass and destroying the machinery that kept it in its different dimension. Tozer travelled by means of a special ring constructed by Mygan of Londra, and Hawkmoon determines that to ensure the security of the Kamarg they must find this Mygan before the Dark Empire does.

In Londra, Countess Flana Mikosevaar, King-Emperor Huon's only living relative, witnesses the return of Baron Meliadus.

Baron Meliadus consults his brother-in-law, Taragorm, Master of the Palace of Time, as to whether his experiments will yet enable him to travel through time and destroy Castle Brass.

Count Shenegar Trott has an audience with King-Emperor Huon and is given a secret mission. Baron Meliadus has his own audience to request the assistance of Taragorm in locating Castle Brass, but is told his priority is to act as an envoy to two ambassadors from the mysterious far East Empire of Asiacommunista.

Meliadus greets the two ambassadors – Kaow Shalang Gatt and Jong Mang Shen – and introduces them to the assembled Granbretan Court, in the hope of learning more about Asiacommunista's forces and technology.

Meliadus visits Taragorm at the Palace of Time and learns of the disappearance of Elvereza Tozer. Meliadus vows to find the source of his ability.

Hawkmoon and Huillam D'Averc use Tozer's rings to travel back to Granbretan.

Meliadus spends the day showing the two Asiacommunista ambassadors the sights of Londra, before meeting Countess Flana.

Flana seduces Meliadus to get close to the two ambassadors, whom she finds intriguing.

Flana enters the ambassadors' quarters and discovers that they are really Hawkmoon and D'Averc. Rather than turn them over however she agrees to help them, and the pair disguise themselves as Dark Empire soldiers and flee in her private ornithopter.

Upon discovering the disappearance of the two ambassadors King-Emperor Huon chastises Baron Meliadus, and orders him to forget searching for Castle Brass. Meliadus vows to himself to defy him, and sets off to look for the man who enabled Elvereza Tozer to travel through the dimensions.

Hawkmoon and D'Averc fly to Yel (Wales) and leave their ornithopter to begin their search for Mygan of Llandar. They are attacked by a group of mutants that are all that remain of the local inhabitants of Yel, and take refuge in the city of Halapandur.

Halapandur contains many old scientific devices from the old age and D'Averc pockets the charge from a gun. The pair see Dark Empire forces led by Baron Meliadus searching the area, and leave the city. They find the cave where Mygan lives but it is empty. Hawkmoon and D'Averc are captured by Meliadus, bound and kept prisoner in the cave while Meliadus searches the surrounding countryside for Mygan.

Mygan appears in the cavern and frees Hawkmoon and D'Averc. Meliadus returns, a fight ensues and Mygan is injured. Following Mygan's instructions Hawkmoon and D'Averc use their rings to shift themselves into another dimension. Mygan tells them that Hawkmoon must fulfill his destiny and seek Narleen (New Orleans) and the Sword of the Dawn, then the Runestaff in the city of Dnark (New York). Mygan dies from his wounds.

=== Book Two ===
Hawkmoon and D'Averc are picked up in a strange machine sphere by a man called Zhenak-Teng. In this new dimension they are in the land of the Kammps – hi-tech underground cities where the inhabitants hide from creatures called the Charki. Zhenak-Teng tells them that Narleen is a trading city on the coast.

The Kammp is attacked by a group of Charki and Hawkmoon and D'Averc flee in one of the spheres, though Zhenak-Teng is killed in the assault.

The sphere crashes in woodland and Hawkmoon and D'Averc continue on foot. They are attacked by a pool monster in the woods and flee to the River Sayou, where they build a raft to head to Narleen.

Hawkmoon and D'Averc are picked up by a pirate ship belonging to Lord Valjon and are pressed into slavery. The pair manage to free themselves and try to escape when the ship is attacked by another.

The attacking ship belongs to Pahl Bewchard, a sworn enemy of Lord Valjon. Hawkmoon and D'Averc free the other slaves on Valjon's ship and scuttle it. Bewchard offers to transport them to Narleen.

Hawkmoon and D'Averc arrive in Narleen. Bewchard informs them that the Sword of the Dawn is in the possession of the Pirate Lords, who live in Starvel – an enclave within Narleen. The Sword of the Dawn is worshipped by the pirates, as it is said to contain the power of an ancient sorcerer. Hawkmoon and D'Averc learn that they are in Amarehk (America).

At Bewchard's house Hawkmoon and D'Averc meet his sister Jeleana, but are summoned to the quayside by the news that Bewchard's ship has been torched in revenge for his sinking of Valjon's ship. While they are gone Valjon visits Bewchard's house and threatens Jeleana. Bewchard vows to continue his fight against Valjon, now aided by Hawkmoon and D'Averc.

Bewchard takes Hawkmoon and D'Averc shopping for new clothes, but they are attacked by pirates and Bewchard is taken into Starvel.

Hawkmoon and D'Averc scale the outer wall of Starvel and discover Bewchard being prepared for sacrifice by Valjon to the Sword of the Dawn. Hawkmoon and D'Averc attack but are overcome by the pirates.

Hawkmoon and D'Averc are laid out for sacrifice alongside Bewchard when the Warrior in Jet and Gold appears and frees them. Hawkmoon kills Valjon and at the prompting of the Warrior in Jet and Gold calls upon the Legion of the Dawn – a group of ghostly warriors who reside in the Sword of the Dawn – to defeat the pirates.

Bewchard gives Hawkmoon and D'Averc a ship to continue their journey. The Warrior in Jet and Gold tells Hawkmoon that it is his destiny to seek the Runestaff in the city of Dnark, but Hawkmoon decides instead to escape his destiny by returning to Europe.
