= The Crystal and the Amulet =

The Crystal and the Amulet is a novel by James Cawthorn published in 1986.

== Plot summary ==
The Crystal and the Amulet is the second part of a pictorial adaptation of the "Runestaff" tetralogy for Hawkmoon, and is illustrated in black-and-white.

== Reception ==
Dave Langford reviewed The Crystal and the Amulet for White Dwarf #81, stating: "With flints of humour amid the horror, too, as witness the unfortunate slave suffering the consequences of playing Call of Cthulhu is the background of one sequence."

== Reviews ==
- Fantasy Review
