= The Vengeance of Rome =

2006 novel by Michael Moorcock

- Dust jacket from the first edition
- Author: Michael Moorcock
- Cover artist: Stephen Parker
- Language: English
- Series: Pyat Quartet
- Genre: Literary fiction
- Publisher: Jonathan Cape
- Publication date: 2006
- Publication place: United Kingdom
- Media type: Print (hardback)
- Pages: 618 pp
- ISBN: 0-224-03119-8
- OCLC: 62132375
- Dewey Decimal: 823.914 22
- LC Class: PR6063.O59 V46 2006
- Preceded by: Jerusalem Commands

The Vengeance of Rome is a historical fiction novel by English author Michael Moorcock, published by Jonathan Cape in 2006. It is the fourth and final in the Pyat Quartet tetralogy, preceded by Jerusalem Commands.

== Plot summary ==
In the novel, Colonel Pyat, an incarnation of the Eternal Champion, goes to Italy and Germany, where he becomes involved in Fascism and Nazism, including sexual encounters with Ernst Röhm and Adolf Hitler and a sojourn in Dachau. Mrs Cornelius, the mother of Jerry Cornelius, is another major character. The end of the novel sees Pyat confronted with his ambiguous heritage and his own unreliability as a narrator.

== Reception ==
D. J. Taylor in The Guardian commented: "Like one or two other things written in Moorcock's grand manner, this rambles all over the place, is full of passages which the busy reader may want to skip, and yet in the end redeems itself by the sheer vigour of its imaginative attack".

John Clute critiqued the novel, writing: "No matter how many more fantasies Moorcock may compose in his actual life, Pyat is the terminus they will crash into. Pyat is, in a sense, Moorcock's Tempest. But he is more draconian here than Shakespeare. Pyat does not recast the oeuvre it terminates as dreams; it recasts that oeuvre as lies. Along with its stablemates, the book as a whole—though it is almost inevitably too long, too stenographic in its rendering of Pyat's unceasing dances of deflection and panic—constitutes one of the most remarkable presentations ever achieved of the wrongness of the imagining of the 20th century. It recasts the 20th century, which Pyat has been claiming for thousands of pages to represent, as lies: It tells us that for 100 years we have been lying about what we have done to the world. Lying like Pyat. Vengeance is an unrelentingly brilliant book; its airlessness—for it is stifling to read, though it is at the same time almost impossible not to continue reading—is consummate...the final pages of Vengeance are deeply excruciating. Pyat's final, inevitable act of betrayal, which nails tight over his soul the coffin of his excremental self, is an act of such inconceivable cruelty and stupidity that we know, after all the thousands of pages, that there is nothing left to say. And the book closes, without air. The revelation is that there is no air to breathe".
