= James Cawthorn (artist) =

British author, illustrator (1929–2008)

- Born: 21 December 1929; Gateshead
- Died: 2 December 2008 (aged 78); Gateshead
- Occupation: Illustrator

James Cawthorn (1929-2008) was a British critic, a writer and an illustrator, associated through much of his career with Michael Moorcock. ' He was born in Gateshead on 21 December 1929 and died 2 December 2008.

In the 1960s he was the illustrator for covers for New Worlds magazine.

In the early 70s James Cawthorn published his oversized graphic novel Stormbringer with Savoy Books. about Elric of Melniboné. He also made maps for Michael Moorcock's works (like in The Fantastic Swordsmen).

In 1977 he created adverts for the science-fiction bookshop Dark They Were and Golden Eyed, which were published in Time Out.

He illustrated the novel The Crystal and the Amulet, published in 1986.

== Partial bibliography ==
- Fantasy: The 100 Best Books (London: Xanadu Publications, 1988, ISBN 0-947761-24-1; Carroll & Graf, 1988, ISBN 0-88184-335-0), by James Cawthorn and Michael Moorcock)
  - Fantasy: The 101 Best Books (Gateway/Orion Publishers, 2017, ISBN 978-1-4732-1984-7 with Michael Moorcock revised and reissued)
