= The Chinese Agent =

1970 novel by Michael Moorcock

- First edition (UK
- Author: Michael Moorcock
- Language: English
- Genre: Comedy novel Spy novel
- Publisher: Hutchinson (UK); Macmillan (US)
- Publication date: 1970
- Publication place: United Kingdom
- Media type: Print (hardback & Paperback)
- Pages: 185 pp

The Chinese Agent (1970) is a comic novel by Michael Moorcock. It is a revision of Somewhere in the Night, which Moorcock first published in 1966 under the pseudonym Bill Barclay. Although Moorcock is best known as the author of fantasy fiction and science fiction-based parables such as Behold the Man and The Dancers at the End of Time, here he writes a light-hearted caper that parodies the spy novel genre.

The Chinese Agent was recently reissued in the United Kingdom as Jerry Cornell's Comic Capers. The new edition includes a sequel, The Russian Intelligence (1980).

== Characters ==
- Jeremiah "Jerry" Cornell is a handsome but slightly seedy Londoner whose shady past might have sent him to prison, were it not for certain skills that make him more valuable as an agent for British Intelligence. His name, with the initials "J.C.", is one of the author's trademarks: other Moorcock protagonists include Jherek Carnelian and Jerry Cornelius.
- Arnold Hodgkiss is a young Chinese American patent attorney whose secret identity is "Jewellery Jules". He is a notorious jewel thief who has never been caught, or even suspected.
- Shirley Withers is a receptionist at the National Insurance Company (aka Cell 87), where she and Jerry both work. She initially dislikes him, mostly because she can never remember his name; she keeps calling him "Mr. Cornelius". Later, she becomes Jerry's girlfriend, and, although he thinks it is only a temporary arrangement, she has other ideas.
- Kung Fu Tzu, the Chinese agent of the title, is in London to steal plans for "Project Glass", a powerful new laser technology. He becomes convinced, through a series of accidents, that Jerry is a super agent of James Bond calibre.
- The Cornells, Jerry's blood relatives, are an assortment of hideously depraved petty thieves, most of whom live together in a filthy hovel in London's slums. The most disgusting of them, Uncle Edmond, is a junk dealer with a semi-sentient midden heap in his yard.

== Plot introduction ==
Arnold Hodgkiss, a jewel thief who has come to London to steal the Crown Jewels, is dreamily casing the Tower of London when a strange man approaches him and says "The crown is large". Hodgkiss, nonplussed, replies "And very heavy", unwittingly giving the correct countersign. The man, a spy, thrusts a parcel at Hodgkiss and disappears. Hodgkiss keeps the parcel, hoping to turn it in some way to his advantage.

Soon afterward, Jerry Cornell receives a new assignment: he is to discover the whereabouts of plans for "Project Glass", which have been stolen. Although the thief has been caught, the plans are still missing, and are believed to be in the hands of a fiendish Chinese agent named Kung Fu Tzu. Meanwhile, Kung is hopping mad because he never actually got the plans; they were given to Hodgkiss by mistake.

The comedy of errors intensifies as Cornell tracks Kung, who in turn follows Hodgkiss, who eludes Kung but finds trouble aplenty when he tries to steal a brooch from a stall on Portobello Road.

== Comments ==
Moorcock's comic instincts show through, sometimes darkly, in many of his works; here, he gives them free rein. Nobody dies, either – at least, not permanently.

As the absurd characters frantically chase each other through the heart of London, Moorcock offers both lively comic adventure and a bizarre (but oddly affectionate) look at the city's slum-dwellers. London's Portobello Road, for example, with its hard-bitten costermongers, becomes nothing less than a force of nature: when Hodgkiss, a world-renowned jewel thief, tries to lift a brooch from a Portobello merchant's stall, he is hunted down like a dog. A still better example is Jerry's odious Uncle Edmond, who is so fantastically dirty that the rubbish pile in his yard has congealed and come to life. When two communist operatives try to intimidate him, he sneaks up behind them and pushes them into the quivering pile, escaping while they fight to extricate themselves from its gelatinous embrace.
