= Corum Jhaelen Irsei =

Fictional character created by Michael Moorcock

- Corum Jhaelen Irsei. Cover of Corum (The Tale of the Eternal Champion), written by Michael Moorcock (this edition was published in 1992).
- First appearance: The Knight of the Swords (1971)
- Last appearance: The Sword and the Stallion (1974)
- Created by: Michael Moorcock

Corum Jhaelen Irsei (known also as "the Prince in the Scarlet Robe" and "Corum of the Silver Hand") is a fictional fantasy hero in a series of novels by British writer Michael Moorcock. The character was introduced in the novel The Knight of Swords, published in 1971. This was followed by two other books published during the same year, The Queen of Swords and The King of Swords. The three novels are collectively known as The Swords Trilogy, or the "Corum Chronicles trilogy" or "the Chronicles of Corum". Both The Knight of the Swords and The King of the Swords won the August Derleth Award in 1972 and 1973 respectively. The character then starred in three books making up the "Silver Hand trilogy", and has appeared in other stories taking place in Moorcock's multiverse.

Corum is a hero with disabilities, losing his left hand and right eye early in his first story. The hand and eye are later replaced by the Eye of Rhynn and the six-fingered Hand of Kwll, powerful artifacts that help Corum against his enemies. Corum is usually reluctant to use these two artifacts, as they involve methods and dark forces that conflict with his personal morality. Since the Eye of Rhynn causes Corum to see multiple planes of reality simultaneously, he often wears an eye patch over it to keep from being overwhelmed. After he loses both artifacts, Corum relies on a normal eyepatch and a silver prosthetic hand.

Corum is one of many incarnations of Michael Moorcock's "Eternal Champion", a soul who is reborn frequently throughout the multiverse and usually fights to restore or maintain the Cosmic Balance between Chaos and Law. In some stories, Corum's adventures allow him to meet other aspects of the Eternal Champion, such as Elric of Melniboné, Erekosë, and Dorian Hawkmoon. While Elric famously owes allegiance to the chaos god Arioch, Corum follows the cause of Law and begins his adventures by opposing the plans of Arioch (or his universe's version of the same being).

== Fictional character biography ==
Corum lives during an age before recorded history, when human beings are rising on Earth and beginning to war with the planet's older societies. Corum's race, the Vadhagh, understands advanced science regarding the nature of reality. Through force of will, they are able to perceive and even shift through different dimensional planes for different purposes. The primitive humans of the age mistake these scientific tricks for sorcery and believe the Vadhagh engage in demonic rituals and witchcraft.

Corum's people are long-lived and believe they have nothing to fear from humans. Over the centuries, they become complacent and ignorant of the world around them. As a result, they are taken by surprise when a human tribe hunts them down and slaughters them. The last survivor as far as he knows, Corum is tortured and mutilated by the human barbarians, losing an eye and a hand before he escapes. He wants vengeance against all humanity, but later learns humans make up many societies of different beliefs and moralities. After encountering sorcerers and god-like beings, Corum learns all reality is influenced by the forces of Chaos and Law. Corum dedicates himself to maintaining balance between both forces, as disaster and death occur if either side holds too much influence.

== Collections ==
=== The Swords Trilogy ===
This trilogy consists of The Knight of the Swords (1971), The Queen of the Swords (1971), and The King of the Swords (1971). In the United Kingdom it has been collected as an omnibus edition titled Corum, Swords of Corum and most recently Corum: The Prince in the Scarlet Robe (vol. 30 of Orion's Fantasy Masterworks series). In the United States the first trilogy has been published as Corum: The Coming of Chaos.

==== Plot ====
Prince Corum is a Vadhagh, one of a race of long-lived beings with limited magical abilities dedicated to peaceful pursuits such as art and poetry. Corum's father sends him away from their home, Castle Erorn, on a quest to learn the fate of their kinsmen. Corum eventually discovers that a group of "Mabden" (men), led by the savage Earl Glandyth-a-Krae, have raided all of the Vadhagh's castles, and raped and slaughtered all of the Vadhagh therein, including Corum's entire family. Arming himself, Corum attacks and kills several of the Mabden before being captured and tortured. After having his left hand cut off and right eye put out, Corum escapes by moving into another plane of existence, becoming invisible to the Mabden. They depart, and Corum is found by The Brown Man, a dweller of the forest of Laahr able to see Corum while out of phase. The Brown Man takes Corum to a being called The Giant of Laahr, who treats his wounds and explains he has a higher purpose.

Travelling to Moidel's Castle (a likely incarnation of Mont-Saint-Michel), Corum encounters his future lover, the Margravine Rhalina, a Mabden woman of the civilized land of Lwym an Esh. Having found out Corum's location by torturing and killing the Brown Man of Laahr, Glandyth-a-Krae marshalled his allies to Moidel's Castle. Glandyth had kept Corum's former hand and eye as souvenirs, and showed them to Corum to provoke a reaction. Rhalina uses sorcery (a ship summoned from the depths of the ocean and manned by her drowned dead husband and crew) to ward off an attack by Glandyth-a-Krae. Determined to restore himself, Corum and Rhalina travel to the island of Shool, a near immortal and mad sorcerer. During the journey Corum observes the Wading God, a mysterious giant who trawls the ocean with a net. Upon arriving at the island, Shool takes Rhalina hostage, and then provides Corum with two artifacts to replace his lost hand and eye: the Hand of Kwll and the Eye of Rhynn. The Eye of Rhynn allows Corum to see into an undead netherworld where the last beings killed by Corum exist until summoned by the Hand of Kwll.

Shool then explains that Corum's ill fortune has been caused by the Chaos God Arioch, the Knight of the Swords. When Arioch and his fellow Chaos Lords conquered the Fifteen Planes, the balance between the forces of Law and Chaos tipped in favor of Chaos, and their minions - such as Glandyth-a-Krae - embarked on a bloody rampage. Shool sends Corum to Arioch's fortress to steal the Heart of Arioch, which the sorcerer intends to use to attain greater power. Corum confronts Arioch, and learns Shool is nothing more than a pawn of the Chaos God. Arioch then ignores Corum, who discovers the location of the Heart. Corum is then attacked by Arioch, but the Hand of Kwll crushes the Heart and banishes the Chaos God forever. Before fading from existence, Arioch warns Corum that he has now earned the enmity of the Sword Rulers. Corum then meets with The Giant of Laahr, who reveals himself to be Lord Arkyn, the godlike Lord of Law whose realm had been taken over by Arioch. Arkyn tells Corum the destruction of Arioch is the first step towards Law regaining control of the Fifteen Planes. Corum returns to the island to rescue Rhalina, and discovers Shool has become a powerless moron. Shool is devoured by his own creations soon afterwards.

On another five planes, the forces of Chaos - led by Xiombarg, Queen of the Swords - reign supreme and are on the verge on eradicating the last resistance from the forces of Law. The avatars of the Bear and Dog gods plot with Earl Glandyth-a-Krae to murder Corum and return Arioch to the Fifteen Planes. Guided by Arkyn, Corum, Rhalina and companion Jhary-a-Conel cross the planes and encounter the King Without A Country, the last of his people who in turn is seeking the City in the Pyramid. The group locate the City, which is in fact a floating arsenal powered by advanced technology and inhabited by a people originally from Corum's world and his distant kin.

Besieged by the forces of Chaos, the City requires certain rare minerals to continue to power their weapons. Corum and Jhary attempt to locate the minerals and also encounter Xiombarg, who learns of Corum's identity. Corum slows Xiombarg's forces by defeating their leader, Prince Gaynor the Damned. Xiombarg is goaded into attacking the City directly in revenge for Arioch's banishment. Arkyn provides the minerals and confronts Xiombarg, who has manifested in a vulnerable state. As Arkyn banishes Xiombarg, Corum and his allies devastate the forces of Chaos. Glandyth-a-Krae, however, escapes and seeks revenge.

A spell - determined to have been cast by the forces of Chaos - forces the inhabitants of Corum's plane to war with each other (including the City in the Pyramid). Desperate to stop the slaughter, Corum, Rhalina, and Jhary-a-Conel travel to the last five planes, ruled by Mabelode, the King of the Swords. Rhalina is taken hostage by the forces of Chaos and Corum has several encounters with the forces of Chaos, including Earl Glandyth-a-Krae.

Corum also meets two other aspects of the Eternal Champion: Elric and Erekosë, with all three seeking the mystical city of Tanelorn for their own purposes. After a brief adventure in the "Vanishing Tower", the other heroes depart and Corum and Jhary arrive at their version of Tanelorn. Corum discovers one of the "Lost Gods", the being Kwll, who is imprisoned and cannot be freed until whole. Corum offers Kwll his hand, on the condition that he aid them against Mabelode. Kwll accepts the terms, but reneges on the bargain until persuaded to assist. Corum is also stripped of his artificial eye, which belongs to Kwll's brother, the Lost God Rhynn. Kwll transports Corum and Jhary to the court of Mabelode, with the pair fleeing with Rhalina when Kwll directly challenges the Chaos God. On Kwll's instruction, Corum tosses the eye into the sea. It is recovered by the mysterious Wading God Corum had previously encountered, who is revealed to be Rhynn, which distracts Glandyth-a-Krae during his duel with Corum.

In a final battle, Corum avenges his family by killing Glandyth-a-Krae and decimating the last of Chaos' mortal forces. Kwll later appears to Corum and reveals that all the gods - of both Chaos and Law - have been slain in order to free humanity and allow it to shape its own destiny.

=== The Silver Hand Trilogy ===
This trilogy consists of The Bull and the Spear (1973), The Oak and the Ram (1973), and The Sword and the Stallion (1974). It was titled The Prince with the Silver Hand in the United Kingdom and The Chronicles of Corum in the United States respectively. The previous trilogy hinted at a Celtic or proto-Celtic setting for the stories - the terms mabden (human beings) and shefanhow (demons) occurring in these books are both Cornish language words. The Silver Hand trilogy is more explicit in its Celtic connections, with overt borrowings from Celtic mythology.

==== Plot ====
Set eighty years after the defeat of the Sword Rulers, Corum has become despondent and alone since the death of his Mabden bride Rhalina. Plagued by voices at night, Corum believes he has gone insane until old friend Jhary-a-Conel advises Corum it is in fact a summons from another world. Listening to the voices allows Corum to pass to the other world, which is in fact the distant future. The descendants of Rhalina's folk, the Tuha-na-Cremm Croich (see: Crom Cruach), who call Corum "Corum Llew Ereint" (see: Lludd Llaw Eraint), face extinction by the Fhoi Myore (Fomorians). The Fhoi Myore, seven powerful but diseased and barely sentient giants, with the aid of their allies have conquered the land and plunged it into eternal winter. Allying himself with King Mannach, ruler of the Tuha-na-Cremm Croich, Corum falls in love with his daughter Medhbh (see: Medb).

Corum also hears the prophecy of a seeress, who claims Corum should fear a brother (who will apparently slay him), a harp and above all, beauty. Corum seeks the lost artifacts of the Tuha-na-Cremm Croich - a sacred Bull, a spear, an oak, a ram, a sword and a stallion - which will restore the land. Corum gains new allies, Goffanon (a blacksmith and diminutive giant, a member of the Sidhe race) and Goffanon's cousin and true giant Illbrec. They battle the Fhoi Myore, who themselves have allies: a returned Prince Gaynor, the wizard Calatin and his clone of Corum, the Brothers of the Pine, the undead Ghoolegh and a host of giant demonic dogs. After being instrumental in the death of two of the Fhoi Myore and restoring to his senses the encircled Amergin, the High King and Chief Druid of the Tuha-na-Cremm Croich, Corum and his allies fight a final battle in which all their foes are destroyed.

Corum decides not to return his own world, and is attacked by his clone, whom he defeats with the aid of a spell placed on his silver hand by Medhbh. Medhbh, however, attacks and wounds Corum, having been told by the being the Dagdah that their world must be free of all gods and demi-gods if they are to flourish as a people. Corum is then killed with his own sword by his animated silver hand, thereby fulfilling the prophecy.

== Bibliography ==
The Swords trilogy:

- The Knight of the Swords (1971)
- The Queen of the Swords (1971)
- The King of the Swords (1971)

The Silver Hand trilogy:

- The Bull and the Spear (1973)
- The Oak and the Ram (1973)
- The Sword and the Stallion (1974)

Additional appearances:

- The Vanishing Tower (1971)
- The Sailor on the Seas of Fate (1976)
- The Quest for Tanelorn (1976)

== Awards ==
The August Derleth Award won by:

- The Knight of the Swords - won in 1972
- The King of the Swords - won in 1973
- The Sword and the Stallion - won in 1975

== In other media ==
=== Comics ===
First Comics published The Chronicles of Corum, a twelve issue limited series (January 1986 - December 1988) that adapted the "Swords Trilogy". It was followed by the four issue, bi-monthly limited series Corum: The Bull and the Spear (January - July 1989), which adapted the first book in the second trilogy.

These have been reprinted in 4 hardcover volumes by Titan Comics.

=== Role-playing game ===
Darcsyde Productions produced a supplement for use with Chaosium's Stormbringer (2001) role-playing game adapting the characters and settings from the Corum series for role-playing.

=== eBooks ===
Gollancz released the entire Corum stories in both print and ebook form, commencing in 2013. The ebooks are available via Gollancz's SF Gateway site.

=== Audiobooks ===
In 2016, GraphicAudio produced dramatized audiobook versions of Corum. AudioFile magazine criticised this audiobook for depicting Corum's "inconsistent accent", but otherwise commended its "well-placed sound effects", "light musical score" and "strong selection of narrators".
