= Wizardry and Wild Romance: A Study of Epic Fantasy =

1987 book by Michael Moorcock

- Author: Michael Moorcock
- Genre: Fantasy
- Publication date: 1987
- ISBN: 978-1932265071

Wizardry and Wild Romance: A Study of Epic Fantasy is a book by Michael Moorcock published in 1987.

== Plot summary ==
Wizardry and Wild Romance: A Study of Epic Fantasy is a book in which Moorcock discusses his viewpoint regarding fantasy.

== Reception ==
Dave Langford reviewed Wizardry and Wild Romance: A Study of Epic Fantasy for White Dwarf #95, and stated that "Moorcock's chief touchstone is style, for which he has a fine ear: good verbal effects can win his seal of approval for books which overall I reckon aren't so wonderful, while Moorcock has no time for authors who write flatly, even if (like Tolkien) they can achieve a notable cumulative impact."

== Reviews ==
- Review by Dan Chow (1987) in Locus, #322 November 1987
- Review by Colin Greenland (1987) in Foundation, #41 Winter 1987, (1987)
- Review by David Pringle (1987) in Interzone, #22 Winter 1987
- Review by Darrell Schweitzer (1988) in Aboriginal Science Fiction, January-February 1988
