= The History of the Runestaff =

1979 omnibus collection of fantasy novels by Michael Moorcock

- Dust-jacket from the first edition
- Author: Michael Moorcock
- Cover artist: Bob Haberfield
- Language: English
- Genre: Fantasy
- Publisher: Granada
- Publication date: 1979
- Publication place: United Kingdom
- Media type: Print (hardback)
- Pages: 573
- ISBN: 0-246-11128-3
- OCLC: 59182461

The History of the Runestaff is an omnibus collection of four fantasy novels by British writer Michael Moorcock, consisting of The Jewel in the Skull, The Mad God's Amulet, The Sword of the Dawn, and The Runestaff. Charting the adventures of Dorian Hawkmoon, a version of the Eternal Champion, it takes place in a far-future version of Europe in which the insane rulers of the Dark Empire of Granbretan (the name given to what was once Great Britain) are engaged in conquering the continent. Written between 1967 and 1969, it is considered a classic of the genre, and has proven highly influential in shaping subsequent authors' works.

A subsequent trilogy, The Chronicles of Castle Brass – consisting of Count Brass, The Champion of Garathorm and The Quest for Tanelorn – expand on the original saga and further link them to the Moorcockian Multiverse. In the final pages of the third book, Dorian (along with other champions like Erekose) confronts the malignant entity which used to reside in Elric's Stormbringer and which broke free at the tragic end of the albino prince's saga.

The omnibus has also been published under the title Hawkmoon.

Gollancz released all Hawkmoon stories in both print omnibus and individual ebook form, starting in 2013. The ebooks are available via Gollancz's SF Gateway site.

== Granbretan ==
Granbretan is a far-future version of Great Britain, ruled by the immortal King-Emperor Huon, who dwells in a fluid-filled sphere in Londra, its capital. The inhabitants of Granbretan are renowned for their cruelty and for their practice of wearing masks at all times. The Granbretanian aristocracy and the soldiers they lead belong to the equivalent of chivalric orders, characterised by a totemic animal. The orders have their own secret languages and their animal-masks make their members resemble bipedal beasts. The post-apocalyptic world depicted, the apocalypse being referred to as the "Tragic Millennium", has coexisting elements of both "Medieval" (spears, swords, horse-based transport) and more advanced technology, including "flame lances" (laser weapons) and ornithopters (flying machines powered by flapping wings).

The geopolitical situation depicted is a reversal of that in the Second World War. The future Britain is a brutal empire, bent on the total conquest of Europe, its armies overwhelming country after country and committing terrible atrocities wherever they come. Conversely, the protagonist Dorian Hawkmoon is a German (though having an English name), originally from Köln, who is exiled by Granbretan's brutal conquest of his homeland but who fights on and rallies the Europeans' resistance to the conquerors.

== Gods of Granbretan ==
The "terrifying ancient gods of Granbretan who were said to have ruled the land before the Tragic Millennium" are based on The Beatles: Jhone, Jhorg, Phowl and Rhunga.

Yet other gods from the "tragic millennium" are based on 20th Century British Prime Ministers Chirshil, the Howling God (Winston Churchill) and Aral Vilsn, the Roaring God (Harold Wilson), Supreme God) or writers: Bjrin Adass, the Singing God (Brian Aldiss); Jeajee Blad, the Groaning God (J. G. Ballard); Jh'Im Slas, the Weeping God (James Sallis).

"Aral Vilsn, the Roaring God" is the "father of Skvese ('credit squeeze') and Blansacredid ('balance of credit') the gods of Doom and Chaos", named after economic terms and political figures of the period when the books were written.

== Adaptations ==
In 1978, Big O Publishing released an adaptation of The Jewel in the Skull, scripted and drawn by James Cawthorn.

In 1986, Chaosium published the role-playing game Hawkmoon.

In 1986, First Comics published a 4-issue comic book adaptation of The Jewel in the Skull, written by Gerry Conway with art by Rafael Kayanan and Alfredo Alcala. The same year, Savoy published The Crystal and The Amulet (adapted from The Mad God's Amulet), with text and illustrations by Cawthorn.

First Comics continued their comic book adaptations with The Mad God's Amulet (1987), written by Conway with art by Kayanan and Rico Rival, the Sword of the Dawn (1987), scripted by Roger Salick with art by Kayanan, and The Runestaff (1988), by Salick and Kayanan.

In 2019, Titan Comics published The Chronicles of Hawkmoon: History of the Runestaff Volume One, which compiled Cawthorn's The Jewel in the Skull and The Crystal and The Amulet.
