= The Dragon in the Sword =

1986 novel by Michael Moorcock

- Cover of the first edition
- Author: Michael Moorcock
- Cover artist: Bob Haberfield
- Language: English
- Series: Erekosë
- Genre: Fantasy novel
- Publisher: Mayflower
- Publication date: 1986
- Publication place: United Kingdom
- Media type: Print (Paperback)
- Preceded by: Phoenix in Obsidian

The Dragon in the Sword is a novel by Michael Moorcock published in 1986, the last of his Erekosë series following The Eternal Champion and Phoenix in Obsidian (both 1970). The first published text is slightly abridged; the full text appears in the UK 1987 edition.

== Plot summary ==
The Dragon in the Sword is a novel in which Erekose, an aspect of the Eternal Champion also known as Count Ulrik Skarlsol, and by many other names, fights against Chaos to uphold the Cosmic Balance.

John Daker, in his guise as the Eternal Champion, still seeks to be reunited with his love, the Eldren princess Ermizhad. The mysterious figure of the Knight in Black and Yellow tells him he must await The Dark Ship. It is known that Ermizhad dwells in the forever elusive mystical city of Tanelorn, which lies somewhere in the Multiverse, perhaps at the hub of its multifarious worlds and times. Daker experiences continual dreams and visions which provide hints at his destiny; various figures (including an armoured band known as the Warriors at the Edge of Time) make cryptic utterances which Erekose strives to understand. He briefly encounters the dwarf Jermays the Crooked, who had appeared to him in Phoenix in Obsidian when he had killed the sea-stag. In one vision he is addressed as the Princess Sharadim and told he must free the 'dragon in the sword'.

After conversation with the helmsman of The Dark Ship, Daker/Erekose finds himself transported to the realm of Maaschenheem (aka The Middle Marches and the Realms of the Wheel) in the company of 20th-century German man Ulrich Von Bek, who seeks to destroy Hitler. The duo are taken aboard a floating city-ship, 'The Frowning Shield,' which is powered by the burning of human flesh and other materials. Various such ships, known as 'hulls,' are en route to a gathering called The Massing. Erekose learns that in his apparent guise as Prince Flamadin, he was betrothed to his sister, Sharadim, and he is told that popular legend says that he murdered her. Erekose then believes he sees Ermizhad, his love, amongst a throng of Eldren women known as the Ghost Women, who are held to be cannibals. However, she is not Ermizhad, but an Eldren woman named Alisaard.

On escaping from the warlike Captain Armiad of 'The Frowning Shield' with the assistance of some of the 'Ghost Women', Flamadin and Von Bek are transported by sea and towers of light (the Pillars of Paradise) to Ghestenheem, the realm of the 'Ghost Women.' Lady Phalizaarn informs them of the Eldren Ghost Women's history, and Sepiriz (the Knight in Black and Yellow) recounts how in times past a dragon (also known as a 'firedrake') inhabited the body of a sword (different from the Black Sword) which is therefore known as the Dragon Sword. The power-hungry Princess Sharadim (evil twin of Flamadin) is said be negotiating an alliance with Archduke Balarizaaf, ambitious Lord of Chaos and ruler of the Nightmare Marches, which lie at the hub of the wheel of the Six Realms. Flamadin (Erekose/Daker) is told he must seek the Dragon Sword and fight on behalf of Law against Chaos by releasing the dragon and bringing the Sword to the Massing Ground. Sepiriz says this will also enable Von Bek to prevail against Hitler and his Nazis. A party of twelve including Flamadin, Von Bek and Alisaard, is dispatched via the tunnel between the worlds to Valadeka, the home land of Sharadim and Flamadin.

Arriving in the city, where Sharadim is about to have herself crowned Empress, in furtherance of her plot to allow Chaos to rule the Six Realms, Erekose/Flamadin discovers he has a telepathic link with Sharadim. It becomes clear that Sharadim had murdered her twin brother, Prince Flamadin, but that Erekose still lives as an aspect of Flamadin Sharadim stages a murder to implicate Erekose/Flamadin and his companions; however, they capture her and transport her out of the city, debating whether to kill her but deciding to free her on a beach. In search of the Dragon Sword, they then travel to Bargenhelm, with a narrow escape on the way from a deadly 'smoke snake,' to the marvellous cave-city of Adelstane, which is inhabited by the few last of a dying race of bear-folk, the Ursine Princes. Flamadin and his party are directed to a crag where lives Morandi Pag. Pag hints that the Dragon Sword is in his palace. Searching, they discover Jermays the Crooked imprisoned in a cage. He is let out, and they descend to a cavern of Scarlet Crystal beneath the palace, where they are vouchsafed a vision of the Dragon Sword (green-hilted with a black blade) suspended within the crystals. Jermays now tells them that the sword itself is physically to be found in the Nightmare Marches.

Via a complex series of locations and clues the companions fare on, past warring hulls and the realm of the Red Weepers, to the volcano Tortacanuzoo. Alisaard and Von Bek are drawn together in love. Meanwhile Princess Sharadim has now become Empress and rules over various of the realms, bringing the influence of Chaos to bear. She reanimates the corpse of Flamadin her brother. As Erekose, Alisaard and Von Bek enter the realm of Chaos via the volcano, Sharadim invokes and summons Archduke Balarizaaf, who appears briefly. The companions fare on through various illusions of the Chaos realm, assisted by advice from the Knight in Black and Yellow and Jermays the Crooked. Meanwhile, the armies of Sharadim are attacking and dominating various of the Six realms.

They find themselves transported to the vaults beneath Nuremberg Castle, where Hitler, Goebbels and Goering conjure to visible appearance the Holy Grail. Von Bek seizes the Grail and they leave the castle. Balarizaaf appears and seeks to sway them to Chaos. Von Bek banishes him with the Grail, which is then taken away by the returned Sepiriz. A unicorn ('horned horse') appears and leads them across a lake of blood where they at last behold the Dragon Sword in a wall of crystal. In complicated scenes of identity-shifting, Sharadim attempts to have her zombified dead brother Flamadin take on John Daker/Erekose's soul. Daker protects himself and his companions by using his Arctorios jewel-stone. Back on the hull 'The Frowning Shield,' the corpse-Flamadin and Daker/Erekose tussle over the Dragon Sword as Daker struggles to maintain his own sense of identity. Daker slays the corpse-Flamadin. Sharadim seizes the Dragon Sword and with it shatters the Actorios, but brings about her own destruction. A rent in the cosmic fabric is about to admit all the forces of Chaos; Daker (the Champion), wielding the Dragon Sword, summons the Warriors at the Edge of Time, who engage in a mighty battle against the Chaos forces, defeating them and banishing Balarizaaf to limbo, to the satisfaction of Sepiriz. After a brief excursion back to Adelstane to visit with the Ursine Princes, the companions go to the near-destroyed capital of the Eldren women. Here Daker breaks the Dragon Sword against an ancient anvil, the Iron Round, thus releasing the great she-dragon within. The Eldren women follow the dragon into another realm that opens. Jermays conducts Daker to the Dark Ship, whose helmsman is blind; after hints that the Dragon Sword may be re-forged, the ship returns him to his own time in London. Daker still longs for his love, Ermizahn, but is happy to have no more to with magic and battles in the Cosmic Balance.

== Publication history ==
The Dragon in the Sword is the third in the Eternal Champion sequence, following on from The Eternal Champion and Phoenix in Obsidian, both of which appeared in 1970. Associated works include The Quest for Tanelorn and The Swords of Heaven, the Flowers of Hell (by Moorcock with Howard V. Chaykin), a 1980 graphic novel which follows on from Phoenix in Obsidian.

== Reception ==
Dave Langford reviewed The Dragon in the Sword for White Dwarf #94, and stated that "the pages turn painlessly. For Moorcock, presumably, this represents either a rest between more ambitious books or a quick fund-raiser to pay the rates".

== Reviews ==
- Review by C. W. Sullivan, III (1986) in Fantasy Review, November 1986
- Review by Don D'Ammassa (1987) in Science Fiction Chronicle, #89 February 1987
- Review by Chris Barker (1987) in Vector 140
- Review by Terry Broome (1988) in Vector 142
