= The War Hound and the World's Pain =

1981 novel by Michael Moorcock

- Dust-jacket from the first edition.
- Author: Michael Moorcock
- Cover artist: Rowena Morrill
- Language: English
- Series: Ulrich von Bek
- Genre: Fantasy
- Publisher: Timescape
- Publication date: 1981
- Publication place: United States
- Media type: Print (hardback)
- Pages: 239
- ISBN: 0-671-43708-9
- OCLC: 7575956
- Dewey Decimal: 823/.914 19
- LC Class: PR6063.O59 W3 1981
- Followed by: The City in the Autumn Stars

The War Hound and the World's Pain is a 1981 fantasy novel by English writer Michael Moorcock, the first of the "von Bek" series of novels.

== Plot summary ==
The book is set in Europe ravaged by the Thirty Years' War. Its hero Ulrich von Bek is a mercenary and freethinker, who finds himself a damned soul in a castle owned by Lucifer. Much to his surprise, von Bek is charged by Lucifer with doing God's work, by finding the Holy Grail, the "cure for the world's pain", that will also cure Lucifer's pain by reconciling him with God. Only through doing this can von Bek save his soul.

After many adventures, von Bek eventually finds the Holy Grail, and discovers that it will set mankind on the path to self-redemption through rationality, without the help of God or the hindrance of Lucifer.

The story has a sequel in The City in the Autumn Stars (1986).

== Reception ==
Dave Pringle reviewed The War Hound and the World's Pain for Imagine magazine: "I am pleased to report that it makes a delightful read. It is much superior to the earlier quickies in, say, the 'Dorian Hawkmoon' series, Moorcock has honed his skills over the years, and they now show a fine gleaming edge".

== Reviews ==
- Review by Jeff Frane (1981) in Locus, #250 November 1981
- Review by Charles Platt (1982) in The Patchin Review, Number Three
- Review by Darrell Schweitzer (1982) in Science Fiction Review, Spring 1982
- Review by Mary Gentle (1982) in Vector 106
- Review by Joan Gordon (1982) in Science Fiction & Fantasy Book Review, #2, March 1982
- Review by Debbie Notkin (1982) in Rigel Science Fiction, #4 Spring 1982
- Review by Baird Searles (1982) in Isaac Asimov's Science Fiction Magazine, May 1982
- Review by Thomas A. Easton [as by Tom Easton] (1982) in Analog Science Fiction/Science Fact, June 1982
- Review by Tom Staicar (1982) in Amazing Science Fiction Stories, June 1982
- Review by Roger C. Schlobin (1982) in Fantasy Newsletter, #49 July 1982
- Review by Joe Sanders (1982) in Starship, November 1982
- Review [French] by Isabelle Barbé (1984) in SFère, #12
- Review [French] by Stéphane Nicot? (1984) in Fiction, #349
- Review [French] by Jean-Pierre Andrevon (1984) in Fiction, #349
- Review [French] by André-François Ruaud? (1985) in Proxima [France], #8
- Review [French] by Jean-Yves Besnard (1986) in Fiction, #371
- Review by David Pringle (1988) in Modern Fantasy: The Hundred Best Novels
- Review by Bruce Gillespie (1989) in SF Commentary, #67
- Review [French] by Pascal Godbillon (1994) in Yellow Submarine, #107
