= The City in the Autumn Stars =

1986 novel by Michael Moorcock

- dust-jacket from the first edition
- Author: Michael Moorcock
- Language: English
- Genre: Science fantasy
- Publisher: Grafton Press
- Publication date: 1986
- Publication place: United Kingdom
- Media type: Print (hardback & paperback)
- Pages: 344 pp
- ISBN: 0-246-12843-7
- OCLC: 16351520
- Dewey Decimal: 823/.914 19
- LC Class: PR6063.O59 C58 1986

The City in the Autumn Stars: Being a Continuation of the Story of the Von Bek Family and Its Association With Lucifer, Prince of Darkness is a science fantasy novel by British author Michael Moorcock. The second book in the Von Bek trilogy, it was published by Grafton in 1986. The story centres on the characters of Manfred von Bek, a descendant of Ulrich von Bek, who is also the protagonist of the previous book in the series (The War Hound and the World's Pain) and Libussa Cartagena y Mendoza-Chilperic, the Duchess of Crete, along with their journey to the mystical Mittelmarch, and their search for the Holy Grail.

The book was written in tandem with The Laughter of Carthage, part of the Colonel Pyat tetralogy, with one novel being written during the day, and the other at night.

The fiction preface of the novel, written by The Publishers, explains that the text of the book had originally been published anonymously around 1840 in Heidelberg, its authorship later being traced to Manfred von Bek, and that this "somewhat modernised version of Manfred von Bek's Confession" was adapted from an English edition published in London by D. Omer Smith of St. Paul's Churchyard, in 1856.

== Plot summary ==
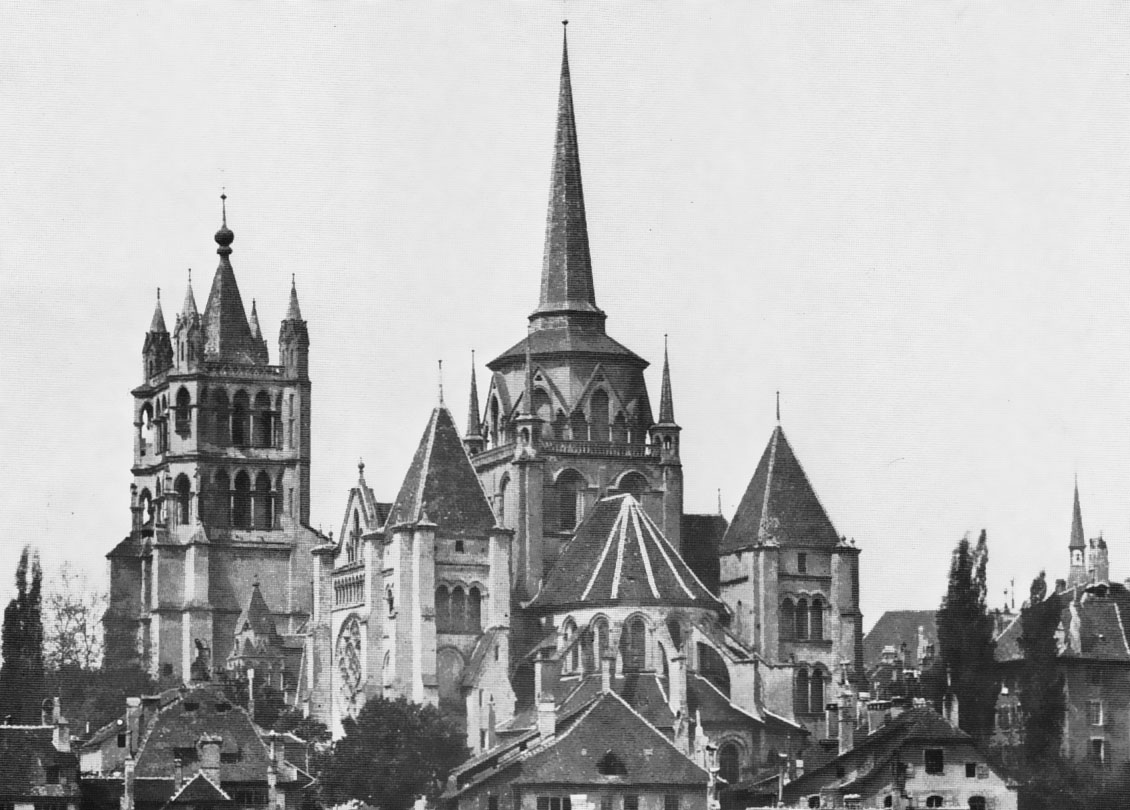
Cathédrale de Lausanne, 1873

Fleeing from the Reign of Terror in 1793, Manfred von Bek (the Ritter von Bek), once a valued revolutionary, leaves Paris and heads towards Switzerland, with the final destination of the Waldenstein city of Mirenberg in mind. Close to Vaud, von Bek, who is masquerading as a messenger carrying secret documents, meets Robert de Montsorbier. Following polite conversation, Montsorbier accuses von Bek of being a traitor, and von Bek flees towards the border.

Shortly after crossing the border, although not knowing it at the time, von Bek meets a group of young revolutionaries on their way to Paris. As Montsorbier is not carrying any flags or standards, the revolutionaries believe him to be part of the Swiss Guard, and open fire. They wound Montsorbier and several of his men. Von Bek thanks them and, after explaining, to their dismay, that the men they opened fire on were enforcers of the Committee of Public Safety, he leaves them, also taking Montsorbier's horse.

After spending the night at an inn—Le Coq D'Or—von Bek awakens to discover that Montsorbier, posing as a member of the Swiss Guard, is searching for him at the inn. Unable to locate the hiding Von Bek, Montsorbier accuses him of being a horse thief, and attempts to gain information on his heading. It is then that von Bek meets Libussa, the Duchess of Crete, who owns the carriage that he'd seen the previous night. She assists him in escaping from Montsorbier, and von Bek becomes smitten with her.

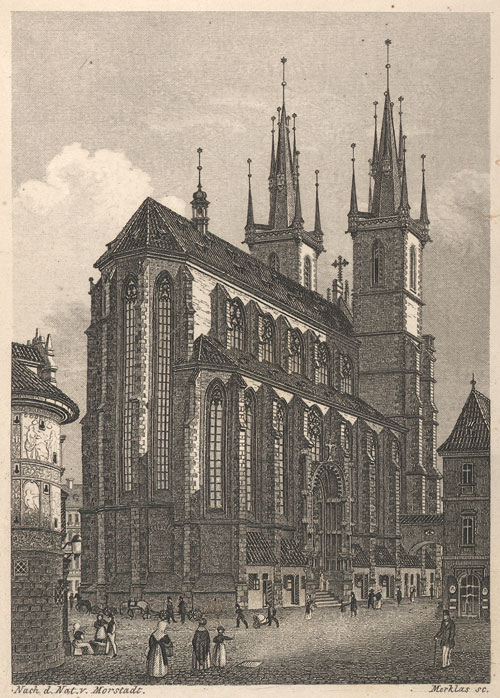
Prague, 1869

Leaving, and intending to follow Libussa to Lausanne, von Bek meets Orkie Lochorkie, whose given name is Colin James Charles, better known as the Chevalier de St Odhran, an aeronaut, balloonist and confidence trickster. The two meet at the Hackmesser Pass, as von Bek has unknowingly caused a landslide while shooting a hare for his supper. St Odhran expresses his intent of heading to Mirenberg to do 'business'; von Bek, however, does not inform him that he also intends to travel to Mirenberg, but readily agrees to meet with St Odhran if their paths cross again.

On arrival in Lausanne, von Bek discovers that the Libussa has already left, and a friend informs him that there is, in fact, no Duchess of Crete. There is, however, an unmarried Duke of Crete, who has been living in Prague for the last five years, though he dresses up as a woman as a flight of fancy. Von Bek resolves to travel to Prague, where a convention of alchemists has been called, and search for Libussa there.

Not finding Libussa in Prague, von Bek journeys onwards to Mirenberg, where he once again meets St Odhran, and becomes involved in a confidence trick regarding the sale of shares in a new airship that he and von Bek will build. After several misadventures, the pair decide that they must flee Mirenburg, as the amount of money they have swindled is simply too much, and one of their major backers has turned up murdered. On the night of the escape, two mysterious figures board the airship. As the ship departs, it becomes evident that one of the passengers is indeed Libussa, Duchess of Crete. The other, is the villain Klosterheim, the same man who attempted to kill Ulrich von Bek more than 100 years previously. After travelling through the shadow land of Mittelmarch, this unlikely alliance arrives in the City in the Autumn Stars. Soon after meeting with Lucifer, he becomes involved in a quest to find the Holy Grail.

== Sources ==
- "Moorcock's Miscellany".
- Brown, Charles N.; William G. Contento. "The Locus Index to Science Fiction (1984–1998)".
