= Naked Came the Phoenix =

2001 novel by Nevada Barr

Naked Came the Phoenix: A Serial Novel
- First edition cover
- Author: Nevada Barr, Mary Jane Clark, Diana Gabaldon, J. A. Jance, Faye Kellerman, Laurie R. King, Val McDermid, Perri O'Shaughnessy, Anne Perry, Nancy Pickard, J. D. Robb, Lisa Scottoline, and Marcia Talley
- Language: English
- Genre: Mystery
- Publisher: Minotaur Books
- Publication date: August 15, 2001 (1st edition)
- Pages: 320 (Hardcover 1st edition)
- ISBN: 978-0-312-25194-9

Naked Came the Phoenix: A Serial Novel is a 2001 mystery novel written in serial installments by thirteen popular female authors, including collaboration editor Marcia Talley. The title was intended to evoke 1969's famously collaborative Naked Came the Stranger rather than the 1996 parody Naked Came the Manatee.

== Authors ==
All thirteen authors have been featured in The New York Times Book Review. The authors included:

- Chapter 1 by Nevada Barr
- Chapter 2 by Nora Roberts, credited as J. D. Robb
- Chapter 3 by Nancy Pickard
- Chapter 4 by Lisa Scottoline
- Chapter 5 by Perri O'Shaughnessy, pen name of Mary O'Shaughnessy and Pam O'Shaughnessy
- Chapter 6 by J. A. Jance
- Chapter 7 by Faye Kellerman
- Chapter 8 by Mary Jane Clark
- Chapter 9 by Marcia Talley
- Chapter 10 by Anne Perry
- Chapter 11 by Diana Gabaldon
- Chapter 12 by Val McDermid
- Chapter 13 by Laurie R. King

== See also ==
- The Floating Admiral
