= Bouchercon XXIII =

1992 mystery and detective fiction convention

- Date: October 8, 1992
- Location: Toronto, Ontario
- Country: Canada
- Hosted by: Al Navis

Bouchercon is an annual convention of creators and devotees of mystery and detective fiction. It is named in honour of writer, reviewer, and editor Anthony Boucher; also the inspiration for the Anthony Awards, which have been issued at the convention since 1986. This page details Bouchercon XXIII and the 7th Anthony Awards ceremony.

== Bouchercon ==
The convention was held in Toronto, Ontario, Canada on October 8, 1992; running until the 10th. The event was chaired by Al Navis, owner of the Toronto-based mystery book-store, Handy Book Exchange.

=== Special Guests ===
- Lifetime Achievement award — Charlotte MacLeod
- Guest of Honor — Margaret Millar
- Toastmaster — Otto Penzler

== Anthony Awards ==
The following list details the awards distributed at the seventh annual Anthony Awards ceremony.

=== Novel award ===
Winner:

- Peter Lovesey, The Last Detective

Shortlist:

- Susan Dunlap, Rogue Wave
- Linda Grant, Love Nor Money
- J. A. Jance, Hour of the Hunter
- Nancy Pickard, I.O.U.
- Marilyn Wallace, A Single Stone

=== First novel award ===
Winner:

- Sue Henry, Murder on the Iditarod Trail

Shortlist:

- Mary Cahill, Carpool
- Margaret Lucke, A Relative Stranger
- Rebecca Rothenberg, The Bulrush Murders
- Leslie Watts, The Chocolate Box
- Gloria White, Murder on the Run

=== Short story award ===
Winner:

- Liza Cody, "Lucky Dip", from A Woman's Eye

Shortlist:

- Linda Grant, "Last Rites", from Sisters in Crime 4
- Wendy Hornsby, "Nine Sons", from Sisters in Crime 4
- Margaret Maron, "Deborah's Judgment", from A Woman's Eye
- Peter Lovesey, "The Crime of Miss Oyster Brown", from Ellery Queen's Mystery Magazine May 1991
- Maxine O'Callaghan, "Wolf Winter", from Sisters in Crime 4

=== Critical / Non-fiction award ===
Winner:

- Maxim Jakubowski, 100 Great Detectives

Shortlist:

- Robert Adey, Locked Room Murders
- Frankie Y. Bailey, Out of the Woodpile
- Lesley Henderson, Twentieth Century Crime And Mystery Writers 3rd ed
- Tony Hillerman, Talking Mysteries: A Conversation with Tony Hillerman
- M. J. McCauley, Jim Thompson: Sleep with the Devil

=== True crime award ===
Winner:

- David Simon, Homicide: A Year on the Killing Streets

Shortlist:

- Vincent Bugliosi & Bruce Henderson, And the Sea Will Tell
- Eileen Franklin & William Wright, Sins Of The father: The Landmark Franklin Case: a daughter, a memory, and a murder
- Christopher Joyce & Eric Stover, Witnesses from the Grave: The Stories Bones Tell
- Mark Lane, Plausible Denial
- Joe McGinniss, Cruel Doubt

=== Short story collection / anthology award ===
Winner:

- Sara Paretsky, A Woman's Eye

Shortlist:

- Martin H. Greenberg & Ed Gorman, Cat Crimes
- Cathleen Jordan, Alfred Hitchcock's Home Sweet Homicide
- Charlotte MacLeod, Christmas Stalkings: Tales of Yuletide Murder
- Eleanor Sullivan, Fifty Years of the Best from Ellery Queen's Mystery Magazine
- Marilyn Wallace, Sisters in Crime 4
