= Nancy Pickard =

American novelist

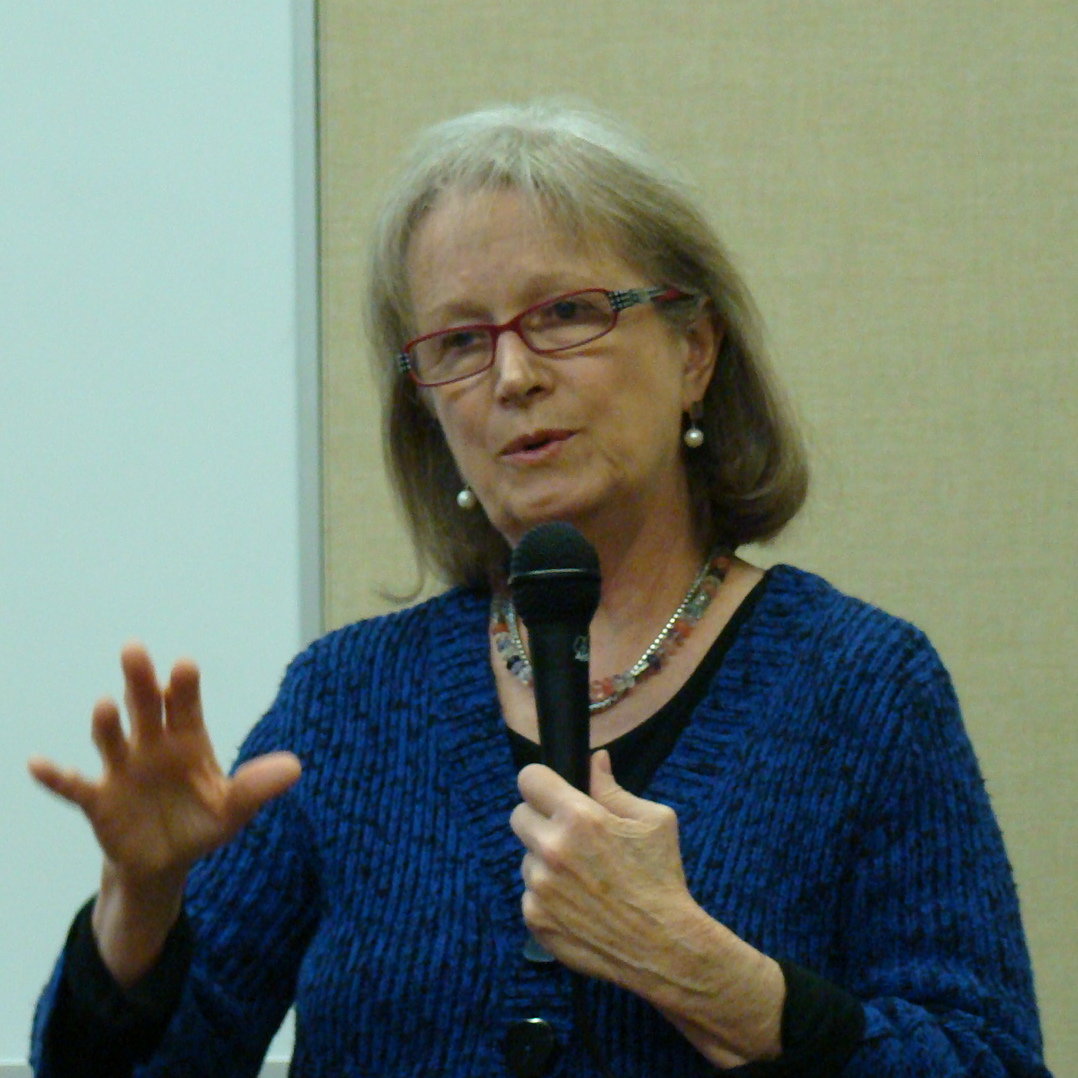
- Nancy Pickard (2013)
- Born: September 19, 1945 (age 80); Kansas City, Missouri
- Occupation: Crime writer
- Writing career
- Genre: Mystery
- Website: www.nancypickard.com

Nancy Pickard (born September 19, 1945, in Kansas City, Missouri) is an American crime novelist. She has won five Macavity Awards, four Agatha Awards, an Anthony Award, and a Shamus Award. She is the only author to win all four awards. She also served on the board of directors of the Mystery Writers of America. She received a degree in journalism from the University of Missouri in Columbia, Missouri and began writing when she was 35 years old.

She is frequently a panelist at the Great Manhattan Mystery Conclave, a convention for mystery writers and mystery fans in Manhattan, Kansas.

In 2017 her novel The Scent of Rain and Lightning was adapted into a film of the same name.

== Published works ==
=== Jenny Cain series ===
- 1984 Generous Death ISBN 0380859939
- 1985 Say No to Murder ISBN 0380896427
- 1986 No Body ISBN 0684185938
- 1987 Marriage is Murder ISBN 0684187604
- 1988 Dead Crazy ISBN 0684187612
- 1990 Bum Steer ISBN 0671680404
- 1991 I.O.U. ISBN 0671680412
- 1993 But I Wouldn't Want to Die There ISBN 0671723308
- 1994 Confession ISBN 0671782614
- 1995 Twilight ISBN 0671782711

=== Eugenia Potter Series ===
- 1992 The 27-Ingredient Chili Con Carne Murders (w/Virginia Rich) ISBN 0385302274
- 1998 The Blue Corn Murders ISBN 0385312245
- 2001 The Secret Ingredient Murders ISBN 038531227X

=== Marie Lightfoot series ===
- 2000 The Whole Truth ISBN 0671887955
- 2001 Ring of Truth ISBN 0671887971
- 2002 The Truth Hurts ISBN 0743412036

=== Non-series novels ===
- 2001 Naked Came the Phoenix (serial novel) Marcia Talley, ed. ISBN 0312251947
  (with Nevada Barr, Mary Jane Clark, Diana Gabaldon, J. A. Jance, Faye Kellerman, Laurie R. King, Val McDermid, Perri O'Shaughnessy, Anne Perry, J. D. Robb and Lisa Scottoline)
- 2006 The Virgin of Small Plains ISBN 0345470990
- 2010 The Scent of Rain and Lightning ISBN 978-0345471017

=== Short stories ===
- 1981 "A Man Around the House"
- 1987 "I, Witness"
- 1989 "Afraid All the Time"
- 1989 "The Dead Past"
- 1990 "Storm Warnings"
- 1991 "Dust Devil"
- 1991 "Lazy Susan"
- 1991 "The Scar"
- 1992 "Every Wednesday"
- 1992 "Fat Cat"
- 1992 "Sex and Violence"
- 1994 "Sign of the Times"
- 1995 "Speak No Evil"
- 1995 "Valentine's Night"
- 1996 "A Rock and a Hard Place"
- 1997 "Dr. Couch Saves a Cat"
- 1997 "It Had to Be You"
- 1997 "Lady Finch-Waller Regrets"
- 1997 "Love's Cottage"
- 1997 "The Potluck Supper Murders"
- 1998 "Dr. Couch Saves a Bird"
- 1998 "The Private Life of a Private Eye"
- 1999 "The First Ladies' Secret"
- 1999 "Nine Points for Murder"
- 1999 "Out of Africa"
- 1999 "Verdict"
- 2000 "Afraid of the Dark"
- 2001 "Lucky Devil"
- 2001 "Tea for Two"
- 2002 "Dr. Couch Saves a President"
- 2002 "Old Eyes"
- 2005 "There is No Crime on Easter Island"

=== Short story anthologies ===
- 1994 Nancy Pickard presents Malice Domestic 3 ISBN 0671738283
- 1999 Storm Warnings ISBN 0786218118
- 1999 The First Lady Murders ISBN 0671014447
- 1999 Mom, Apple Pie, and Murder ISBN 0425168905

=== Non-fiction ===
- 2003 Seven Steps on the Writer's Path (with Lynn Lott) ISBN 034545524X

== Awards and recognition ==
- 1986 Anthony award winner, best paperback original, Say No to Murder
- 1987 Anthony award nominee, best novel, No Body
- 1988 Agatha award nominee, best novel, Dead Crazy
- 1988 Anthony award nominee, best novel, Marriage is Murder
- 1988 Macavity award winner, best novel, Marriage is Murder
- 1989 Agatha award nominee, best short story, "Afraid All The Time"
- 1990 Edgar award nominee, best short story, "Afraid All the Time"
- 1990 Agatha award winner, best novel, Bum Steer
- 1990 Anthony award winner, best short story, "Afraid All the Time"
- 1990 Macavity award winner, best short story, "Afraid All the Time"
- 1991 Agatha award winner, best novel, I.O.U.
- 1991 Shamus award winner, best short story, "Dust Devil"
- 1992 Anthony award nominee, best novel, I.O.U.
- 1992 Edgar award nominee, best mystery novel, I.O.U.
- 1992 Macavity award winner, best novel, I.O.U.
- 1995 Agatha award nominee, best novel, Twilight
- 1999 Agatha award winner, best short story, "Out of Africa"
- 2000 Edgar award nominee, best novel, The Whole Truth
- 2001 Macavity award nominee, best mystery novel, The Whole Truth
- 2006 Agatha award winner, best novel, The Virgin of Small Plains
- 2006 Anthony award nominee, best novel, The Virgin of Small Plains
- 2006 Edgar award nominee, best novel, The Virgin of Small Plains
- 2006 Macavity award winner, best short story, "There Is No Crime on Easter Island"
- 2007 Macavity award winner, best mystery novel, The Virgin of Small Plains
- 2008 Agatha award nominee, best short story, "A Nice Old Guy"
- 2011 Macavity award nominee, best mystery novel, The Scent of Rain and Lightning
