= The Opium General and other stories =

1984 collection of novellas, short stories and articles by Michael Moorcock

- First edition, over art by Mark Harrison.
- Author: Michael Moorcock
- Language: English
- Publisher: Harrap
- Publication date: 1984

The Opium General and other stories by Michael Moorcock was a hardcover collection of novellas, short stories, and articles. It was published in 1984 by Harrap. It was a collection of new work and rare items.

== Works in the collection ==
- The Alchemist's Question was the last Jerry Cornelius novella and was the cornerstone work of the volume. It was later reprinted in The Cornelius Chronicles, Volume III collection by Avon in 1987. It was reprinted in the A Cornelius Calendar omnibus by Phoenix Books in 1993; an expanded edition was published by Victor Gollancz Ltd. in 2013.
- "The Opium General" was a new short story about a paranoid heroin addict who hallucinates his own dreamworld and the long-suffering girlfriend who deals with him. It was reprinted in The Best of Michael Moorcock by Tachyon Publications in 2009.
- The short stories "Going to Canada", "Leaving Pasadena", and "Crossing into Cambodia" concern the adventures of a Russian political officer who is an unreliable narrator. It takes place in an alternate historical timeline during an apocalyptic world war in which the United States and the Soviet Union are allies.
  They had earlier been collected in the anthology My Experiences in the Third World War by Savoy Books in 1980. The short story "Crossing Into Cambodia" had previously been in the anthology Twenty Houses of the Zodiac by New English Library, Ltd. (NEL) in 1979. The prequel short story "Casablanca", chronologically the first story in the series, was first published in the later anthology Casablanca by Victor Gollancz Ltd. in 1989. All four stories were published together for the first time in the omnibus anthology Earl Aubec and Other Stories by Millennium in 1993; White Wolf republished a slightly different edition in 1999.
- Starship Stormtroopers was an essay critiquing right wing politics in science fiction and fantasy. Authors he discusses include Robert Heinlein, Ayn Rand, Richard Adams, and J.R.R. Tolkien. It had been originally published in Anarchist Review #4 by Cienfuegos press in 1978.
- This was followed by Moorcock's book review of Michael Malet's historical biography of the anarchist Nestor Makhno, Nestor Makhno in the Russian Civil War [Palgrave MacMillan (1982)].
  NOTE: The name "Michael Malet" was a pseudonym adopted by the book's anonymous author.
- Who'll be Next? was an essay critiquing censorship and hypocrisy in Thatcher's Britain. It was originally printed in Index on Censorship (1984).

== Reception ==
Dave Langford reviewed The Opium General for White Dwarf #79, and stated that "two-thirds of the collection is another Jerry Cornelius black comedy, The Alchemist's Question, with all the old character swapping hip non-sequiteurs as entropy bubbles over and nuclear winter seems like the logical option. You either like it or not".

== Reviews ==
- Review by Faren Miller (1985) in Locus, #288 January 1985
- Review by Andy Sawyer (1986) in Paperback Inferno, #63
