= Beautiful Shining People =

2023 novel by Michael Grothaus

Beautiful Shining People (novel)
- Author: Michael Grothaus
- Language: English
- Genre: Literary fiction Coming of Age; Speculative fiction
- Publisher: Orenda Books (United Kingdom); Insignis (Poland)
- Publication date: March 2023 (United Kingdom); June 2024 (Poland)
- Publication place: United Kingdom
- Media type: Print, audio, eBook
- Pages: 374
- ISBN: 978-1914585647

Beautiful Shining People is the second novel by Michael Grothaus, first published in 2023. The novel is coming-of-age speculative literary fiction set in the near future and deals with the themes of isolation and belonging in an increasingly technological world. It also examines the ways artificial intelligence, deepfakes, and the weaponization of social media will impact geopolitics, society, and cultural norms in the decades ahead, and explores how technological advances are often coopted by governments to assert or maintain power.

Though a future-set novel, real-world historical events like the atomic bombing of Hiroshima focus heavily in the story. Grothaus has said his personal experiences in Hiroshima, Japan influenced the writing of the novel.

== Plot summary ==
Beautiful Shining People is primarily set in the future Tokyo, Japan sometime in the 2040s against the backdrop of a digital Cold War waged between the United States and China as part of their superpower rivalry. Generative AI technology like deepfakes is regularly weaponized by the two nations to sow distrust and disinformation in the other's populations.

The protagonist is a 17-year-old American quantum computing prodigy named John, who has been flown to Japan by Sony in a deal that will see the Japanese technology giant purchase the rights to his code. While in Tokyo, John befriends cafe owner and ex sumo wrestler Goeido, waitress Neotnia, and their dog, Inu.

John and Neotnia develop a romantic relationship, but John soon notices that Neotnia seems to suffer from micro seizures which she tries to hide from him. While in bed together, John discovers Neotnia is missing a part of female anatomy and she soon reveals herself to be the world's first android and says the seizures she's been suffering are because of a “splinter” inside her that is causing her physical and mental pain. She theorizes the splinter may have something to do with her missing father, who is her creator and she has been searching for over a year.

John removes the splinter and extracts its metadata which reveals the name "Emiko Ikari", who they track to the Hiroshima Peace Park. Emiko reveals she created Neotnia along with Neotnia's missing father and that Neotnia was made with the intention of being the first model of a line of androids that would help care for Japan's rapidly aging population. Neotnia is devastated to learn she was created with a set purpose and feels betrayed by her father, who always told her that though she was an android, she had free will just like a human being. This causes Neotnia to suffer an existential crisis.

John, Neotnia, and Goeido track Neotnia's father down to a facility in Nagano, Japan. There he reveals that Neotnia does actually have free will because the original code in him that would have made her into a caregiver android was never installed. Instead, Shinto deities called kami used him as a vessel to transcribe a constantly evolving quantum code in her, which has given her true free will. But Neotnia's father urges them to leave, revealing that a US tech giant named Avance, which is part of America's military-industrial complex, saw that the androids could be used to grow America's national power. Security forces from Avance storm the facility and Neotnia's father is killed. Neotnia flees into the mountains behind the facility with John in pursuit.

John catches up with Neotnia and, under a giant torii, Neotnia reveals to him her father's dying words that Avance and the U.S. government wanted to use Neotnia as the first in a line of androids that would act as the physical manifestation of a deepfake, the awareness of which would sow paranoia, distrust, and division among the populations of America's enemies. Despite John's attempts to stop her, Neotnia takes her own life to prevent her code from falling into the wrong hands, sacrificing herself so governments can't continue to use technology to achieve power by inflicting suffering on innocent populations.

== Themes ==
As a coming-of-age novel, Beautiful Shining People examines how young people often feel like outsiders at a time when they want nothing more than to fit into the pack. John and Neotnia each feels their physical deformities segregate them from the rest of the population.

The way governments co-opt technical advances to claim or maintain supremacy and personal power is another theme in the book. Neotnia's father laments how the work of scientists who start with good intentions is frequently coopted to cause suffering on a mass scale, particularly pointing to scientists like Robert Oppenheimer who used their brilliance to create the atomic bomb that was weaponized against the populations of Hiroshima and Nagasaki, the survivors becoming known as Hibakusha.

== Reception ==
Beautiful Shining People received positive praise from the mainstream press and industry publications.

Midwest Book Review “unreservedly recommended” the novel, stating, “Original, eloquent, carefully crafted, and an entertaining read from beginning to end, ‘Beautiful Shining People’ will hold immense appeal to fans of historical thrillers, science fiction, and literary excellence.”

Foreword called Beautiful Shining People "shimmering," giving the novel a starred review. "This beguiling, futuristic tale considers the boundaries between cybernetics and human impulses, as well as questions what constitutes a relationship, both in its yearnings and meaning. There are Japanese deities and nightmarish sacrifices too," the publication wrote. "But John’s connection to Goeido and Neotnia deepens because they all share their vulnerabilities. Each is separate from society for reasons that range from self-imagined insecurity to persecution; their empathy for one another is touching."

SciFi Now named it a Book of the Month, saying “[s]et against a tech heavy backdrop Beautiful Shining People blooms into an emotional and soulful tale that reckons with the isolation we can all feel as outsiders.” SFX Magazine also named Beautiful Shining People a Book of the Month, stating, “That Beautiful Shining People isn't just a slipstream novel with pretensions to being literature is in great part down to the deftness and tenderness with which Grothaus draws his central relationship … to let us explore a world of robots and deepfakes that's just unfamiliar enough to be exotic.”

GeekDad compared the novel's style to David Mitchell’s Number9 Dream and Nick Bradley's The Cat and the City, “mystical novels that dovetail contemporary Japanese culture with older traditions whilst adding a dash of fantasy or science fiction elements,” concluding that “[t]he triangle of John, Neotina, and Goeido's relationship is what makes the novel shine. Each is flawed, and each has suffered tragedy, yet their broken pieces fit together to make something special.”
