= Bouchercon XVII =

1986 mystery and detective fiction convention

- Date: October 10, 1986
- Location: Baltimore, Maryland
- Country: us
- Hosted by: Gail M. Larson

Bouchercon is an annual convention of creators and devotees of mystery and detective fiction. It is named in honour of writer, reviewer, and editor Anthony Boucher; also the inspiration for the Anthony Awards, which have been issued at the convention since 1986. This page details Bouchercon XVII and the inaugural Anthony Awards ceremony.

== Bouchercon ==
The convention was held in Baltimore, Maryland on October 10, 1986; running for two days until the 12th. The event was chaired by Gail M. Larson, owner of the bookshop "The Butler Did It".

=== Special Guests ===
- Guest of Honor — Donald E. Westlake
- Fan Guest of Honor — Chris Steinbrunner
- Toastmaster — Mary Higgins Clark

== Anthony Awards ==
The following list details the awards distributed at the first annual Anthony Awards ceremony.

=== Novel award ===
Winner:

- Sue Grafton, "B" Is for Burglar

Shortlist:

- Sarah Caudwell, The Shortest Way to Hades
- John D. MacDonald, The Lonely Silver Rain
- Charlotte MacLeod, The Plain Old Man
- Sara Paretsky, Killing Orders

=== First novel award ===
Winner:

- Jonathan Kellerman, When the Bough Breaks

Shortlist:

- Susan Kelly, The Gemini Man
- Dick Lochte, Sleeping Dog
- Robert Reeves, Doubting Thomas
- Andrew Vachss, Flood

=== Paperback original award ===
Winner:

- Nancy Pickard, Say No to Murder

Shortlist:

- P.M. Carlson, Murder is Academic
- Earl Emerson, Poverty Bay
- Kate Green, Shattered Moon
- Patrick A. Kelley, Sleightly Murder

=== Short story award ===
Winner:

- Linda Barnes, "Lucky Penny", from The New Black Mask, No. 3

Shortlist:

- Loren Estleman, "Eight Mile and Dequindre", from Alfred Hitchcock's Mystery Magazine May 1986
- Peter Lovesey, "Vandals", from Ellery Queen's Mystery Magazine December 1985
- John Lutz, "Ride the Lightning", from Alfred Hitchcock's Mystery Magazine January 1985
- Ruth Rendell, "The Convolvulus Clock", from Ellery Queen's Mystery Magazine August 1985

=== Movie award ===
Winner:

- Witness

Shortlist:

- Blood Simple
- Fletch
- Jagged Edge
- Young Sherlock Holmes

=== TV Series award ===
Winner:

- Murder, She Wrote

Shortlist:

- Hill Street Blues
- Moonlighting
- Mystery
- Spenser For Hire

=== Grand Master ===
- Barbara Mertz
