= My Experiences in the Third World War =

1980 collection of stories by Michael Moorcock

First edition, cover art by Michael Heslop.

My Experiences in the Third World War was a collection of stories by Michael Moorcock, alone and in collaboration with other creators. It was published by Savoy Books in 1980.

== Contents ==
The title is based upon the three stories "Going to Canada", "Leaving Pasadena" and "Crossing into Cambodia". These relate the adventures of a Russian KGB agent in an alternate historical timeline, in which World War 3 has broken out, this being an apocalyptic conflict in which the United States and the Soviet Union are allies. The collection also includes The Dodgem Division, a previously published Jerry Cornelius short story and extracts from The Adventures of Jerry Cornelius: The English Assassin.

The three stories were supposed to be chapters of a commissioned larger book (to be called Reminiscences of the Third World War) rather than a collection. Savoy Books had been convicted the year before in High Court for selling bootleg records imported from America. The fines and penalties prohibited the cash-strapped publisher from going forward with the full project.

The final three stories were written by Moorcock under his pen name of "James Colvin". "Peace on Earth" was co-written with Barrington J. Bayley (under his pen name of "Michael Barrington"). "Peace on Earth" recounts "two spacefarers [search] for an answer to the fathomless ennui caused by their immortality".

In "The Lovebeast", deadly fallout from years of orbital nuclear testing by the world's governments is slowly killing all life on Earth. The Lovebeast, a creature floating above the Earth that has stored Love within itself for millions of years, wishes to Love mankind. Dying artist Charlie Curtis may be the conduit by which the Lovebeast can connect to humanity.

In The Real Life Mr. Newman (a.k.a. Adventures of the Dead Astronaut), a dying English astronaut returns to an Earth whose cities have been changed to reflect the subconsciousness of their inhabitants.

== Previous publications ==
"The English Assassin" were extracts of a Jerry Cornelius comic strip co-written by Moorcock and M. John Harrison and drawn by Mal Dean and R. Glyn Jones, originally serialized in the International Times from June 1969 (Issue #57, pg.8) to January 1970 (Issue #71, pg.25).

The short story "The Dodgem Division" had first been printed in Speculation magazine (issue No.23; 1969).

"Crossing into Cambodia" had first appeared in the Maxim Jakubowski anthology Twenty Houses of the Zodiac. Going to Canada, "Leaving Pasadena", and "Crossing into Cambodia", It was reprinted in The Opium General and other stories by Harrap in 1984. The short story "Casablanca", the earliest story in the series, was first published in the later anthology Casablanca by Victor Gollancz Ltd. in 1989. All four stories were published together for the first time in the collection Earl Aubec and Other Stories by Millennium in 1993 and White Wolf in 1999.

"The Lovebeast" (1957) and "The Real Life Mr. Newman" (1961) were first printed in The Deep Fix collection (Compact Books 1966). The Deep Fix also reprinted the short stories The Deep Fix (Science Fantasy magazine No.64; 1963), "Peace on Earth" (New Worlds magazine Vol. 30 – No. 89; 1958), and The Pleasure Garden of Felipe Sagittarius (New Worlds magazine Vol.49 – No.154; 1965).
