= Courting Trouble =

- Author: Lisa Scottoline
- Language: English
- Genre: Legal thriller, Mystery fiction
- Publisher: HarperCollins
- Publication date: 2002
- Publication place: United States
- ISBN: 9780061740923
- OCLC: 1152566715
- Preceded by: The Vendetta Defense
- Followed by: Dead Ringer

Courting Trouble is a legal thriller novel written by American author Lisa Scottoline. The seventh entry in the Rosato & Associates series, it follows Anne Murphy, an attorney at the Rosato & Associates law firm, who spends Independence Day at the beach while her house is looked after by an acquaintance who physically resembles her. However, she learns through the morning paper that the acquaintance has been murdered and that the police have misidentified the body as Murphy. She chooses to remain legally dead as she reveals to her colleagues that she is alive and asks for their help in investigating the murder as she prepares for an upcoming high-profile court case.

The novel debuted at #8 on The New York Times Best Seller list and remained on the list for three weeks.

== Reception ==
Ann Hellmuth of The State called the novel a "good-hearted Fourth of July romp with enough fireworks to entertain even the most jaded palate." Eugen Weber of the Los Angeles Times called the it a "fast-moving and suspenseful thriller, cheerful, charming, ditsy, a bit contrived, frequently funny and a good read." Oline H. Cogdill of the Daily Press opined that while Scottoline's "intuitive knack for creating three-dimentional characters who challenge the norm still shines", the novel is "undrecut by too much humour, too much zaniness that override the plot." Ed Grabianowski of The Manhattan Mercury called it "irritating and pointless" with a thrill that "makes no sense". However, he opined that when the humour is not "ghoulish and inappropriate", it is "light and mildly clever."
