= Epiphany Jones =

2016 novel by Michael Grothaus

Epiphany Jones (novel)
- Author: Michael Grothaus
- Language: English
- Genre: Literary fiction Satire; Transgressive fiction Dark comedy
- Publisher: Orenda Books (United Kingdom and United States)
- Publication date: June 2016 (United Kingdom); August 2016 (United States)
- Publication place: United Kingdom
- Media type: Print, audio, eBook
- Pages: 365
- ISBN: 978-1910633335

Epiphany Jones is the debut novel by Michael Grothaus published in June 2016. The novel is a literary thriller, social satire, and dark comedy about America's obsession with sex, celebrity, and the internet, which explores a pornography addict’s unwilling relationship with a woman who thinks she can speak to God and their entanglement with sex traffickers that cater to the Hollywood elite. Grothaus has stated that his personal experiences at the Cannes Film Festival and his disillusionment with the Hollywood film industry were strong inspiration for the novel.

== Plot ==
The novel’s protagonist is Jerry Dresden, an employee at the Art Institute of Chicago, who suffers from a porn addiction as well as psychotic depression. Both are the result of the tragic deaths of his little sister and high-flying Hollywood father years earlier. As a result of his psychotic depression, Jerry suffers from psychotic delusions which make him see people who don’t really exist—people Jerry calls "figments". His mundane but stable life is interrupted one day when his colleague at the museum is murdered and a famous painting by Vincent Van Gogh (Self-Portrait, Spring 1887) is stolen. Returning from work that night Jerry finds the stolen painting in his apartment and the next day he discovers that a woman who he thought was just one of his figments his entire life turns out to be a real person.

This former figment tells Jerry her name is Epiphany Jones and admits she stole the painting and killed Jerry's colleague in order to frame him and blackmails him into helping her find someone she is looking for. Left with no choice, Jerry flees with her to Mexico, then Portugal, and finally to the Cannes Film Festival in France as Epiphany, which says the voice of God is speaking to her and telling her what to do, tracks down a sex trafficking ring that caters to the Hollywood elite. Along the way, Jerry discovers Epiphany is not all she seems to be as their journey grows increasingly fraught with danger and he discovers secrets about both their pasts that will change his life forever.

== Themes ==
As a social satire, Epiphany Jones explores America's obsession with celebrity, especially sex and celebrity. The novel also deals with the isolating aspects of the internet. The main protagonist's porn addiction to fake celebrity pornography, a precursor to deepfakes, is used as a vehicle to explore both subject matters. The novel also examines the nature of belief in a Christian god versus the objective empirical world. This faith versus reason battle is explored in Jerry Dresden's and Epiphany Jones' relationship throughout the novel.

== Reception ==
Epiphany Jones received positive reviews in the mainstream press and on book blogs. The Bookseller described the novel as "an energetic, inventive, gritty and deeply moving thriller cum dark comedy, Epiphany Jones addresses the challenging subject of sex trafficking in a powerful narrative driven by exceptionally well-drawn, unforgettable protagonists." The Sunday Express named Epiphany Jones as one of the 'Best Reads for the Summer', calling it "gloriously funny but dark as hell." The Guardian named it one of the best recent novels, saying Epiphany Jones is "complex, inventive and a genuine shocker, this is the very opposite of a 'comfort' read." Literary critic Maxim Jakubowski called Epiphany Jones "a truly impressive debut" and "a twisting tale at the same time realistically gripping and sardonic" and praised Grothaus' writing for having "a delicate fluency which contrasts with the depravity of his subject matter." The New York Daily News said Epiphany Jones "is a captivating story that manages to be funny, sinister and surprising" and praised Grothaus' main characters as "complex and well-rounded—equal parts sympathetic, mad and maddening."

In 2018 Entertainment Weekly named Epiphany Jones one of the 25 "Most Irresistible Hollywood Novels" of the last 100 years alongside novels by Joyce Carol Oates, Evelyn Waugh, Gore Vidal, Norman Mailer, and F. Scott Fitzgerald.

== Honors and awards ==
In May 2017 Epiphany Jones was long-listed for the 2017 CWA New Blood Dagger Award.

In 2018, Entertainment Weekly named Epiphany Jones one of the 25 "Most Irresistible Hollywood Novels."
