= Iris Knobloch =

President of the Cannes Film Festival

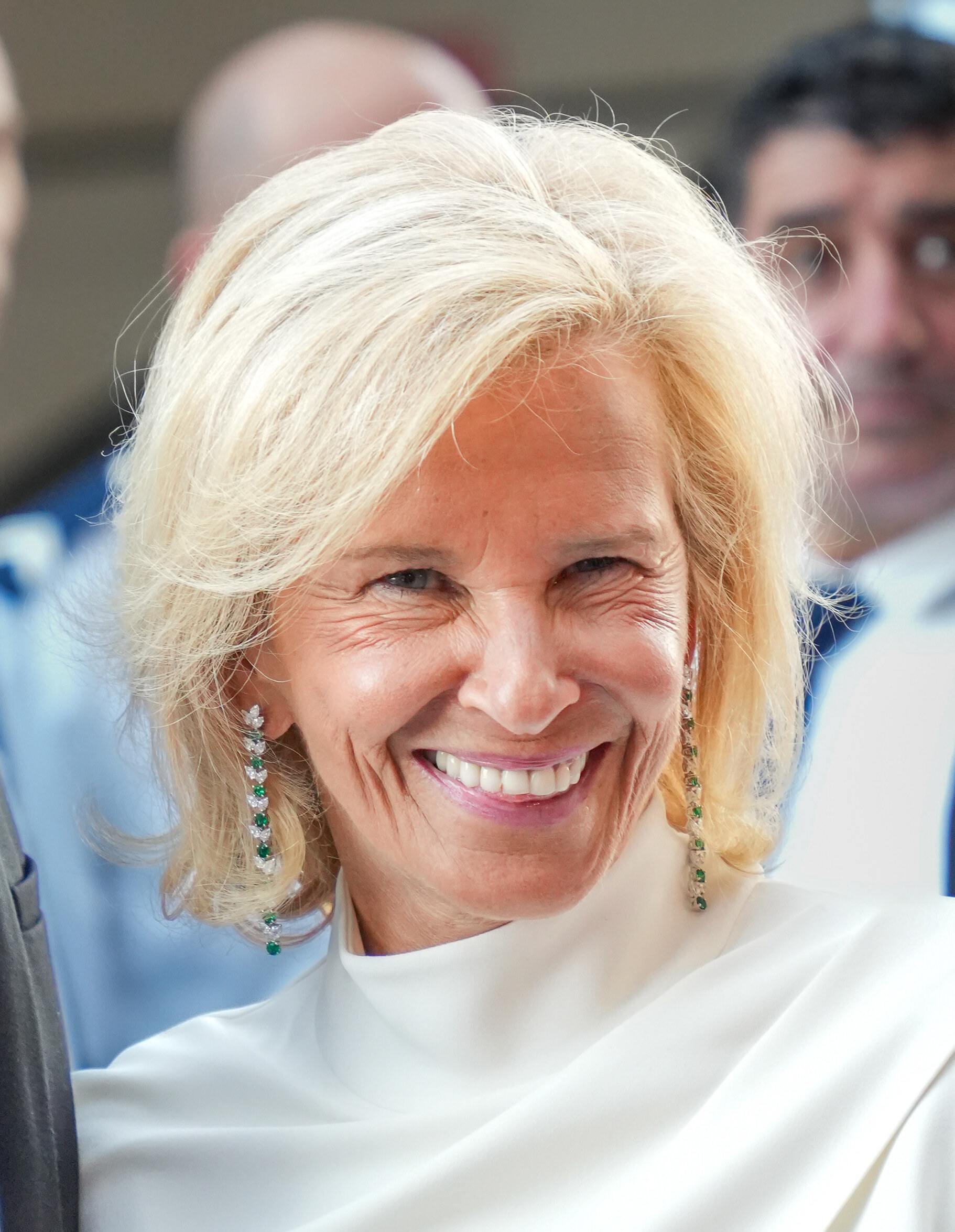
Knobloch at the 2026 Cannes Film Festival

Iris Knobloch (born 13 February 1963 in Munich) is a German film programmer, lawyer, media executive, and the President of the Cannes Film Festival since 2022, the first woman to hold the position.

== Career ==
Knobloch studied law at LMU Munich, where she obtained a doctorate. She also holds a Master of Laws degree from New York University.

She began her career as a lawyer at Norr, Stiefenhofer & Lutz and O'Melveny & Myers in Munich, New York and Los Angeles.

In 2006, she was appointed president of Warner Bros. Entertainment in France, holding the position for fifteen years. In 2020 she became the President of WarnerMedia France, Benelux, Germany, Austria and Switzerland.

In 2021, she left Warner Bros to found I2PO, a Special-purpose acquisition company (SPAC) in the entertainment sector with the Pinault family and banker Matthieu Pigasse.

In March 2022, she was appointed President of the Cannes Film Festival, succeeding Pierre Lescure in 2023, thus becoming the first woman to hold the position.

== Personal life ==
She is the daughter of Charlotte Knobloch and granddaughter of Fritz Neuland, both were Holocaust survivors.
