= Cannes Film Festival =

Annual film festival in France

Coordinates: 43°33′03″N 7°01′05″E

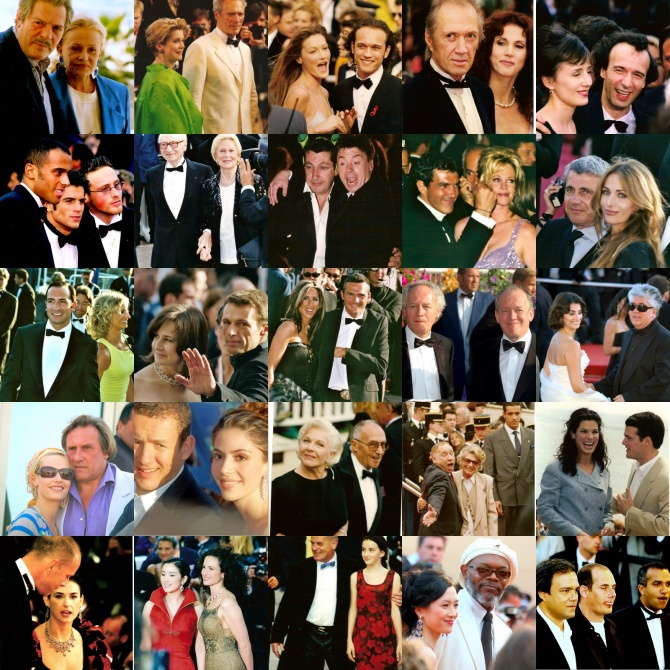
- Actors and celebrities on the red carpet over the years.
- Location: Cannes, France
- Founded: 31 August 1939; 87 years ago (as International Film Festival)
- Awards: Palme d'Or; Grand Prix
- Artistic director: Thierry Frémaux
- Website: festival-cannes.com

Most recent: 2026
- 2027 2025

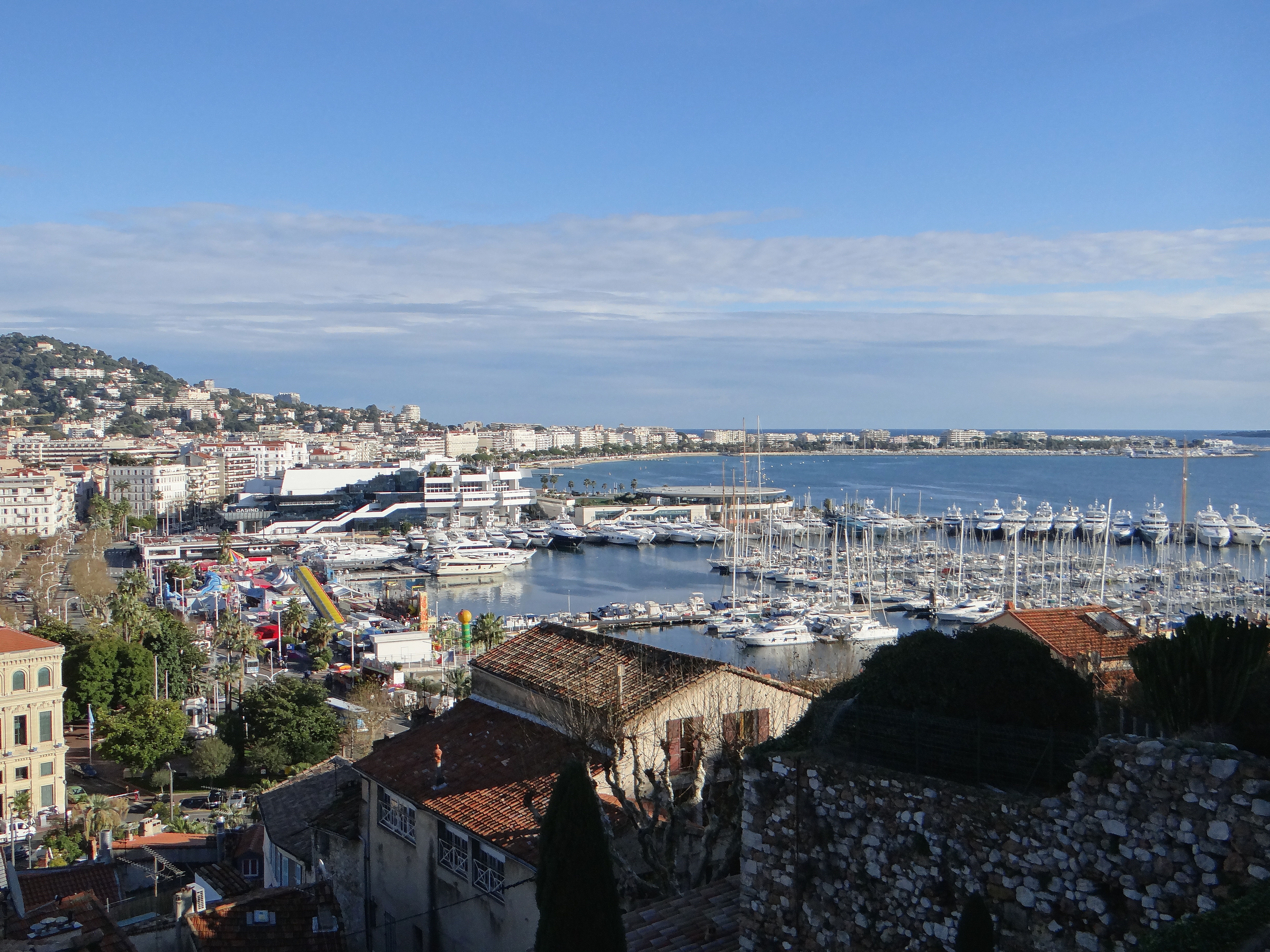
Cannes seen from Le Suquet

The Cannes Film Festival (Note: French: Festival de Cannes [fɛstival də kan].) is considered the most prestigious film festival in the world. Held in Cannes, France, it previews new films of all genres, including documentaries. Founded in 1946, the invitation-only festival is held annually (usually in May) at the Palais des Festivals et des Congrès. The festival was formally accredited by the FIAPF in 1951. Cannes is considered one of the "Big Three" European film festivals, alongside Venice and Berlin, as well as one of the "Big Five" international film festivals, alongside Venice, Berlin, Toronto and Sundance.

== History ==
=== The early years ===
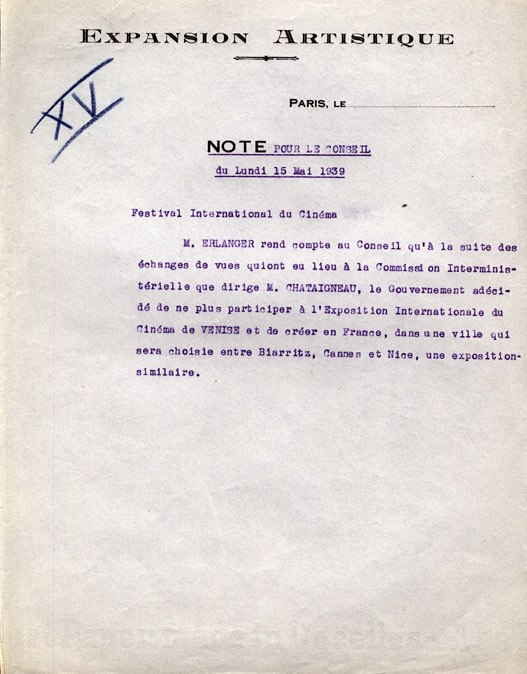
Note from 1939, with the French Government's decision not to participate at the Venice Film Festival anymore, but instead to host its own festival in Biarritz, Cannes or Nice

The Cannes Film Festival has its origins in 1938 when Jean Zay, the French Minister of National Education, at the suggestion of high-ranking official and historian Philippe Erlanger and film journalist Robert Favre Le Bret, set up an international cinematographic festival. The Americans and the British supported it. On 31 May 1939, the city of Cannes was selected as the festival's location over Biarritz and the town hall along with the French government signed the International Film Festival's official birth certificate with the name of Le Festival International du Film.

The festival's creation is widely attributed to France's desire to compete with the Venice Film Festival, at the time the only international film festival, which had shown a fascist bias. In 1937, Benito Mussolini had meddled to ensure that the French pacifist film La Grande Illusion would not win.

The last straw was in 1938, when Mussolini and Adolf Hitler overruled the jury's decisions and awarded the Coppa Mussolini (Mussolini Cup) for the Best Film to the Italian war film Luciano Serra, Pilot, produced under the supervision of Mussolini's son, and the Coppa Mussolini for the Best Foreign Film to Olympia, a German documentary film about the Berlin 1936 Summer Olympics produced in association with the Nazi Ministry of Public Enlightenment and Propaganda even though regulations disqualified documentaries.

Outraged by the decision, the French, British, and American jury members withdrew from the festival with the intention of not returning. This encouraged the French to found a festival.

Cannes was chosen for its touristic appeal as a French Riviera resort town and because its city hall offered to increase the municipality's financial participation and build a dedicated venue for the event.

Hollywood stars such as Gary Cooper, Cary Grant, Tyrone Power, Douglas Fairbanks Jr., Marlene Dietrich, Mae West, Norma Shearer, Paul Muni, James Cagney, Spencer Tracy, and George Raft arrived thanks to an ocean liner chartered by Metro-Goldwyn-Mayer (MGM). On 31 August, the opening night gala took place with the private screening of the American film The Hunchback of Notre Dame. On 1 September, German troops invaded Poland. The festival was postponed for 10 days, to be resumed if circumstances allowed. But the situation only worsened and on 3 September, France and the United Kingdom declared war on Germany, sparking the Second World War. The French government ordered a general mobilisation and the festival was cancelled.

In 1946, the festival was relaunched and from 20 September to 5 October, 21 countries presented films at the First Cannes International Film Festival, which took place at the former Casino of Cannes. In 1947, amid serious efficiency problems, the festival was held as the "Festival du film de Cannes", and films from 16 countries were presented. The festival was not held in 1948 and 1950 due to budgetary problems.

In 1949, the Palais des Festivals was expressly constructed for the occasion on the seafront promenade of La Croisette, although its inaugural roof, while still unfinished, blew off during a storm. In 1951, the festival was moved to spring to avoid direct competition with the Venice Festival, held in autumn.

=== 1950s and 1960s ===
During the early 1950s, the festival attracted much tourism and press attention, with showbiz scandals and high-profile love affairs. At the same time, the artistic aspect of the festival started developing. Because of controversies over the selection of films, the Critics' Prize was created to recognize original films and daring filmmakers. In 1954, the Special Jury Prize was awarded for the first time. In 1955, the Palme d'Or was created, replacing the Grand Prix du Festival. In 1957, Dolores del Río was the first female member of the jury for the official selection.

In 1959, the Marché du Film (Film Market) was founded, giving the festival a commercial character and facilitating exchanges between sellers and buyers in the film industry. It became the first international platform for film commerce. Still, in the 1950s, some outstanding films, like Night and Fog in 1956 and Hiroshima, My Love in 1959 were excluded from the competition for diplomatic reasons. Jean Cocteau, three-time president of the jury in those years, said: "The Cannes Festival should be a no man's land in which politics has no place. It should be a simple meeting between friends."

In 1962, the International Critics' Week was born, created by the French Union of Film Critics as the first parallel section of the Cannes Film Festival. Its goal was to showcase first and second works by directors from all over the world, not succumbing to commercial tendencies. In 1965 Olivia de Havilland was named the first female president of the jury. In 1966, Sophia Loren was president.

The 1968 festival was halted on 19 May. Some directors, such as Carlos Saura and Miloš Forman, had withdrawn their films from the competition. On 18 May filmmaker Louis Malle along with a group of directors took over the large room of the Palais and interrupted the projections in solidarity with students and labour on strike throughout France, and in protest to the eviction of the then President of the Cinémathèque Française. The filmmakers achieved the president's reinstatement and founded the Film Directors' Society (SRF) that year. In 1969 the SRF, led by Pierre-Henri Deleau, created the Directors' Fortnight (Quinzaine des Réalisateurs), a new non-competitive section that programs selected films from around the world, distinguished by the independent judgment displayed in the choice of films.

=== 1970s and 1980s ===
During the 1970s, important changes occurred in the Festival. In 1972, Robert Favre Le Bret was named the new president, and Maurice Bessy the General Delegate. He introduced important changes in the selection of the participating films, welcoming new techniques, and relieving the selection from diplomatic pressures, with films like MASH, and later Chronicle of the Years of Fire marking this turn. In some cases, these changes helped directors like Andrei Tarkovsky overcome problems of censorship in their own country. Also, until that time, the different countries chose the films that would represent them in the festival. Yet, in 1972, Bessy created a committee to select French films, and another for foreign films.

In 1978, Gilles Jacob assumed the position of General Delegate, introducing the Caméra d'Or award, for the best first film of any of the main events, and the Un Certain Regard section, for the non-competitive categories. Other changes were the decrease of length of the festival down to thirteen days, thus reducing the number of selected films; also, until that point the Jury was composed by Film Academics, and Jacob started to introduce celebrities and professionals from the film industry.

In 1983, a new, much bigger Palais des Festivals et des Congrès was built to host the festival, while the Directors' Fortnight remained in the old building. The new building was nicknamed "The Bunker", provoking much criticism, especially since it was hardly finished at the event and several technical problems occurred. In 1984, Pierre Viot replaced Robert Favre Le Bret as President of the Festival. In his term, the Festival started including films from more countries, like Philippines, China, Cuba, Australia, India, New Zealand and Argentina. In 1987, for the first time of the Festival, a red carpet was placed at the entrance of the Palais. In 1989, during the first Cinéma & liberté forum, hundred directors from many countries signed a declaration "against all forms of censorship still existing in the world".

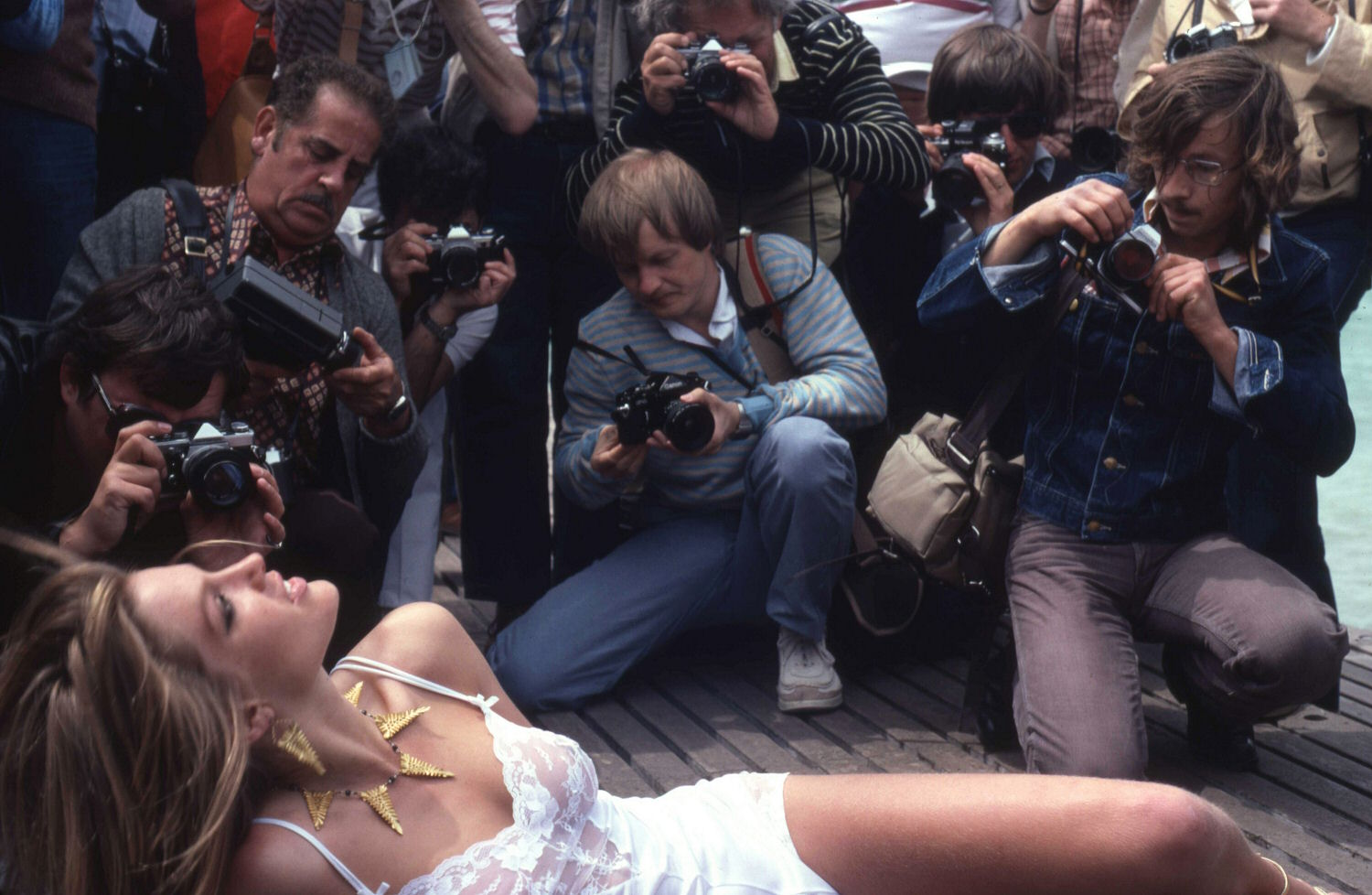
Stars posing for photographers are a part of Cannes folklore

=== 1990s to present ===
In 1998, Gilles Jacob created the last section of the Official Selection: la Cinéfondation, aiming to support the creation of works of cinema in the world and to contribute to the entry of the new scenario writers in the circle of the celebrities. The Cinéfondation was completed in 2000 with La Résidence, where young directors could refine their writing and screenplays, and in 2005, L'Atelier, which helps twenty directors per year with the funding of their films. Gilles Jacob was appointed Honorary President in 2000, and in 2002, the Festival officially adopted the name Festival de Cannes.

During the 2000s, the Festival started focusing more on the technological advances taking place in the film world, especially the digital techniques. In 2004, the restored historical films of the Festival were presented as Cannes Classics, which included documentaries. In 2007, Thierry Frémaux became General Delegate. In 2009, he extended the Festival in Buenos Aires, as La Semana de Cine del Festival de Cannes, and in 2010, he created the Cannes Court Métrage for the Short Film competition.

On 20 March 2020, organisers announced the postponement of the 2020 edition due to the ongoing COVID-19 pandemic; although a small line-up of films was announced as the Official Selection for commercial purposes. Shortly after, the edition was officially cancelled, since organisers refused to adopt an online strategy used by other festivals abroad. It marked the first time the festival would not take place since 1968.

In 2021, since the pandemic was not fully controlled in France, the festival was once again postponed for two months later, dropping its usual late May dates, while masks were enforced to all attendees except for cast and crew during the red carpet. Spike Lee, who had been chosen to lead the main competition jury in 2020, was invited again to head the main competition jury for 2021 Cannes Film Festival. Aiming to accommodate many of the productions not released in 2020, the "Cannes Premiere" section was created featuring a considerable amount of the festival's regular filmmakers who didn't make into the main competition. A special "Cinema for the Climate" section was also created, but later dropped in the following editions.

In 2022, the festival denied press accreditation to Russian journalists associated with outlets who are not opposed to the ongoing Russo-Ukrainian war. On the opening night of the festival, the president of Ukraine, Volodymyr Zelenskyy, made a video appearance where he talked about the war and the role of cinema in it. The selection of Kirill Serebrennikov's Tchaikovsky's Wife, was met with criticism by European Film Academy president Agnieszka Holland, even though the Russian filmmaker had been living in exile in Germany after condemning the ongoing war. Iris Knobloch was elected the first woman president of the festival in the same year, succeeding the co-founder and former head of French pay-TV operator Canal+, Pierre Lescure, who had served since 2014.

The 2025 edition featured a record 45% of films directed by women. One day after the announcement of the ACID official selection, Palestinian photojournalist Fatima Hassouna, one of the main subjects of the documentary film Put Your Soul on Your Hand and Walk by Sepideh Farsi, was killed along with ten members of her family in an Israeli airstrike on their home in Gaza City on 16 April 2025. The festival released an official statement expressing condolences and criticising the ongoing war and violence in Gaza. On the festival's opening day, more than 350 directors, actors and producers signed a letter condemning the killing of Hassouna and denounced the ongoing genocide in Gaza.

== Controversies ==
In recent years, a number of gender and sexual controversies have surrounded the Cannes Film Festival. These include "Heelgate" in which numerous female attendees of a red carpet premiere were stopped from entering in 2015 for wearing flat soled shoes instead of high heels. The incident caused numerous female celebrities to wear flat soled shoes or no shoes at all to other red carpet premieres in a show of solidarity and protest.

General Delegate Thierry Frémaux reportedly "banned" selfies on the red carpet of the festival in 2015.

As a result of the past sexual controversies and the #MeToo movement that arose out of the Harvey Weinstein scandal, in 2018, Cannes Film Festival officials announced the creation of a telephone hotline during the festival in which victims could report incidents of sexual harassment and other crimes. The hotline is in collaboration with the French government.

In 2017, along with the 70th anniversary events of the Festival, the issue of changing the rules on theatrical screening caused controversy, the festival had selected two Netflix-produced films (The Meyerowitz Stories (New and Selected) and Okja) for its main competition. Since 2018, the enforcement of a theatrical screening window of eighteen months in France, only for main competition titles, resulted in the American streaming giant withdrawing completely from the festival, a decision maintained ever since.

== Festival team ==
Year	President	General Delegate		General Secretary
1949	–	–		Jean Touzet
1952	–	Robert Favre Le Bret		Jean Touzet
1972	Robert; Favre Le Bret	Maurice Bessy		Jean Touzet
1978	Robert; Favre Le Bret	Gilles Jacob		Jean Touzet
1984	Pierre Viot	Gilles Jacob		Jean Touzet
1985	Pierre Viot	Gilles Jacob		Michel P. Bonnet
1991	Pierre Viot	Gilles Jacob		François; Erlenbach
2001	Gilles Jacob	General Director; Véronique Cayla	Artistic Delegate; Thierry Frémaux	François; Erlenbach
2005	Gilles Jacob	Catherine Démier	Artistic Delegate; Thierry Frémaux	François; Erlenbach
2007	Gilles Jacob	Thierry Frémaux		François; Erlenbach
2014	Pierre Lescure	Thierry Frémaux		François; Erlenbach
2017	Pierre Lescure	Thierry Frémaux		François; Erlenbach
2020	Pierre Lescure	Thierry Frémaux		François Desrousseaux
2022	Iris Knobloch	Thierry Frémaux		François Desrousseaux

The president of the festival, who represents the festival in front of financial partners, the public authorities and the media, is elected by the board of directors of the festival, officially named the "French Association of the Film Festival".

The board is composed of authorities of the world of cinema, as well as of public authorities which subsidise the event. The president has a renewable 3-year mandate and appoints the members of his team, including the general delegate, with the approval of the board of directors. Sometimes a president, after his last term, becomes the honorary president of the festival.

The general delegate is responsible for the coordination of the events. When Gilles Jacob passed from general delegate to the position of the president, in 2001, two new positions were created to take over his former post, the general director to oversee the smooth running of the event, and the artistic director, responsible for the selection of films. However, in 2007, the artistic director Thierry Frémaux, became again the general delegate of the Festival.

The general secretary is responsible for the reception of works and other practical matters.

== Programmes ==
The Cannes Film Festival is organised in various sections:

=== Official Selection ===
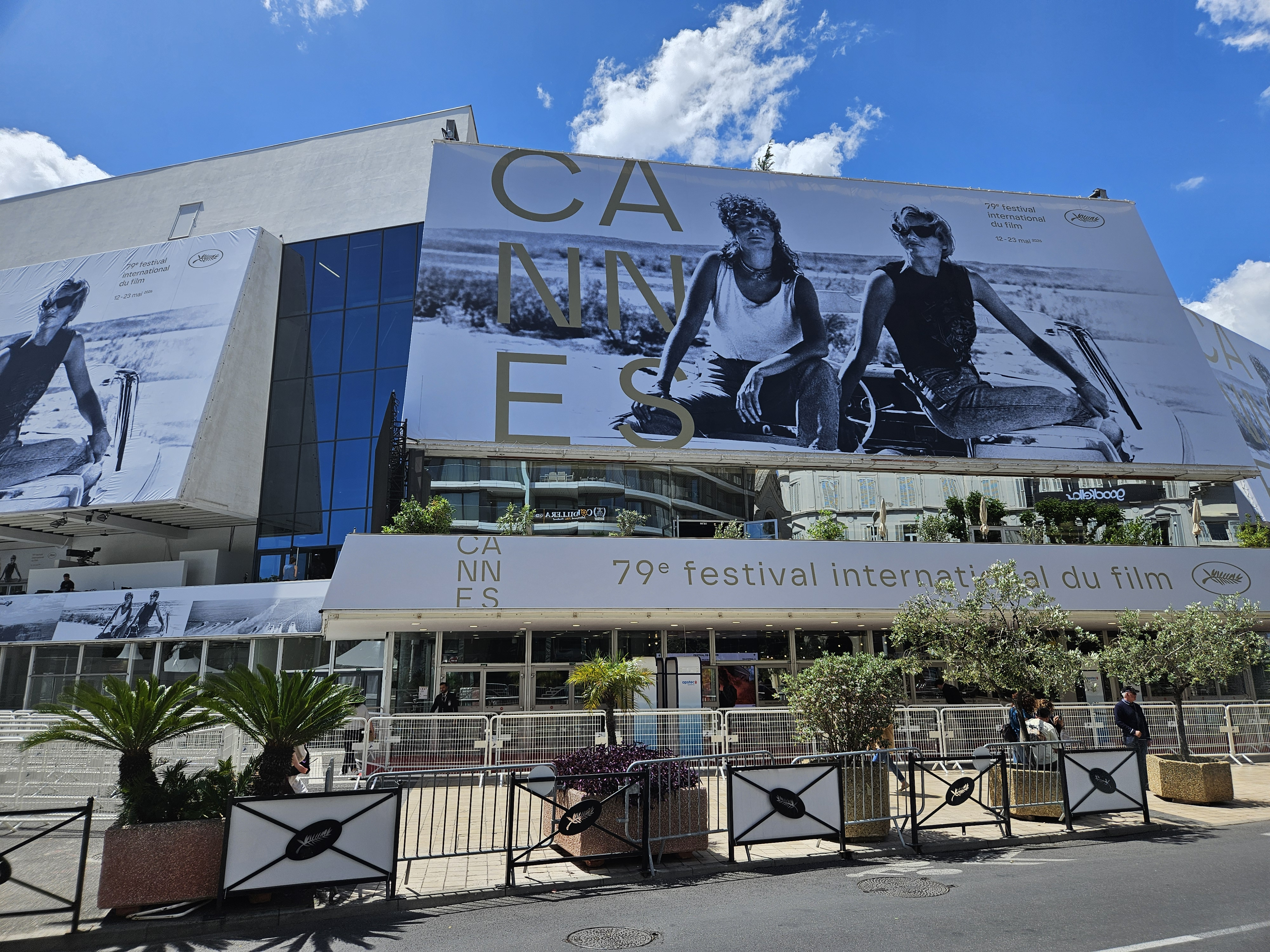
Grand Auditorium Louis Lumière (Théâtre Lumière) facade in 2026

- Main Competition – Usually 22 films, competing for the Palme d'Or, all of them are projected at the Grand Auditorium Louis Lumière (Théâtre Lumière), Cannes' main venue with more than 2.300 seats.
- Un Certain Regard – The festival's second most important section, featuring mostly upcoming filmmakers in their directorial debuts, competing for the Prix un certain regard. All of them are projected at the Salle Debussy.
- Out of Competition – Usually French/American/Asian blockbusters, alongside the festival's opening film, which were not selected for the main competition. All of them are projected at the Grand Auditorium Louis Lumière (Théâtre Lumière).
- Midnight Screenings – Usually horror or comedy feature films with a broad commercial appeal. All of them are projected at the Grand Auditorium Louis Lumière (Théâtre Lumière).
- Cannes Premiere – Usually films which did not make it into the main competition. All of them are projected at the Salle Debussy, but they do not compete for any official prizes.
- Special Screenings – Usually a more diverse slate of feature films. All of them are projected at the Salle Debussy or at the Salle Buñuel, but they do not compete for any official prizes.
- Cinéfondation – Usually fifteen shorts and medium-length productions from film schools over the world, competing for money prizes. All of them are projected at the Salle Buñuel.
- Short Films Competition – Approximately ten short films competing for the Short Film Palme d'Or. All of them are projected at the Salle Debussy.
- Cannes Classics – The section celebrates the world cinema heritage, highlighting classics from the past in new restored prints. The section usually also features documentaries about cinema and tribute films.
- Cinéma de la Plage – The only free section of the festival, presents restored classic films, popular productions and new films to the mass public on Macé beach.
- Cannes Immersive – Since 2024, it features immersive virtual reality productions competing for the section's main prize.

=== Parallel Sections ===
- Critics' Week – Since 1962, it has focused on discovering new talents and showcasing first and second feature films by directors from all over the world. Featuring a small competition for feature films and short films, alongside special screenings.
- Directors' Fortnight – Since 1969, it on focused on discovering new talents, showcasing avant-garde production, or works from established filmmakers.
- ACID – Since 1992, it has focused on discovering new talents, showcasing avant-garde production, promoting the theatrical distribution of independent films.
- Tous les Cinémas du Monde – It showcases the vitality and diversity of cinema across the world. Each day, one country is invited to present a range of features and shorts in celebration of its unique culture, identity and recent film works.

=== Parallel Events ===
- Marché du Film – The busiest film market in the world. In collaboration with Think-Film Impact Production, the Marché du Film has introduced the impACT programme—highlighting critical societal themes through panels and industry workshops. These include "The Future of Film is Green", featuring figures such as Aliza Ayaz, Claire Havet, and Lucy Stone, who shared actionable strategies to make film production more sustainable and climate-conscious.
- Masterclasses – Given in public by world-renowned filmmakers.
- Tributes – Honours internationally renowned artists with the presentation of the Festival Trophee following the screening of one of their films.
- Producers Network – An opportunity to make international co-productions.
- Exhibitions – Each year, an artist, a body of work or a cinematographic theme becomes the focus of an exhibition that diversifies or illustrates the event's programme.

== Official juries ==
Prior to the beginning of each event, the festival's board of directors appoints the juries who hold sole responsibility for choosing which films will receive a Cannes award. Jurors are chosen from a wide range of international artists, based on their body of work and respect from their peers. The appointment of the president of the jury is made following several annual management proposals made in the fall and submitted to the festival's board of directors for validation.

- Main Competition – An international jury composed of a president and various film or art personalities, who determine the prizes for the feature films in Competition.
- Cinéfondation and Short Films – Composed of a president and four film personalities. It awards the Short Film Palme d'Or as well as the three best films of the Cinéfondation.
- Un Certain Regard – Composed of a president, journalists, students in cinema, and industry professionals. It awards the Un Certain Regard Prize for best film and can, moreover, honour two other films.
- Caméra d'Or – Composed of a president, as well as film directors, technicians, and French and international critics. They award the best first film in any category.

The jury meets annually at the historic Villa Domergue to select the winners.

== Awards ==
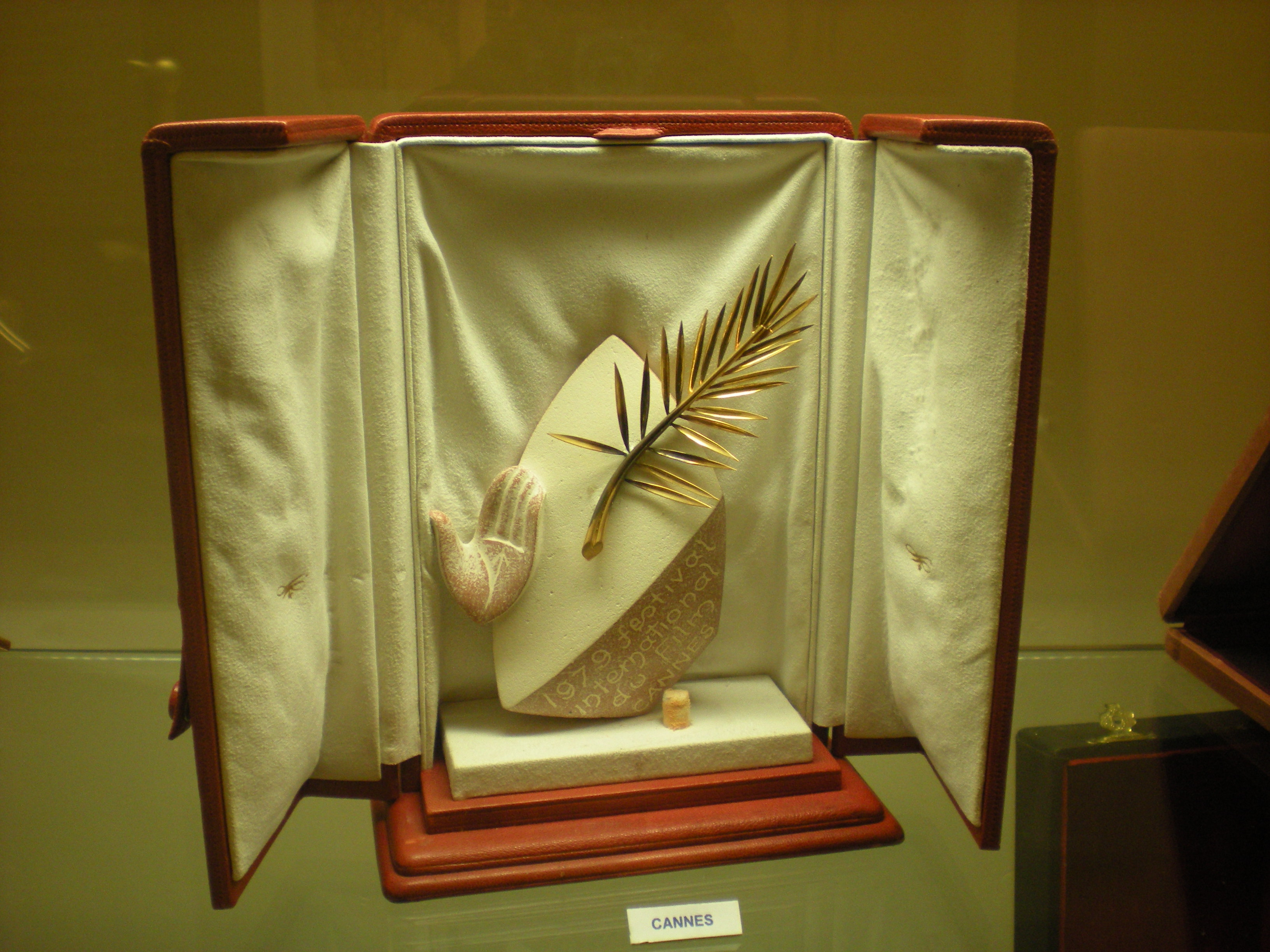
Palme d'Or awarded to Apocalypse Now at the 1979 Cannes Film Festival

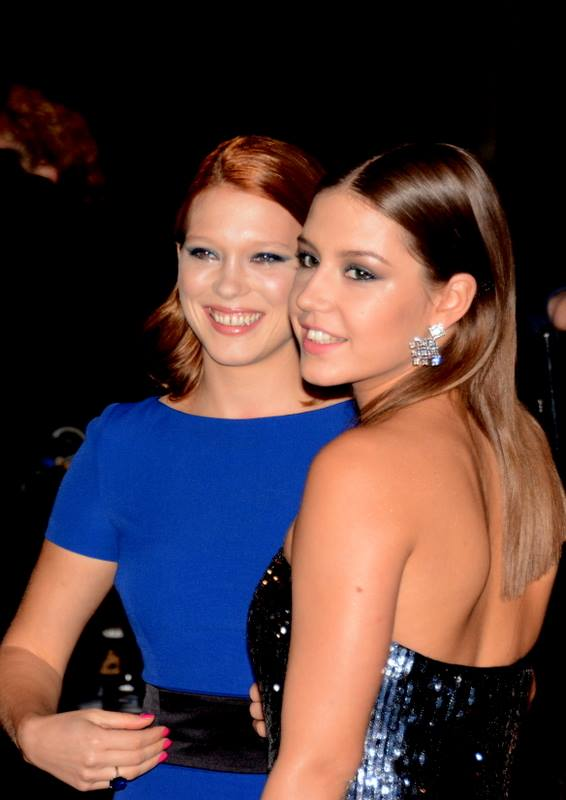
In 2013, in what remains its only such decision, the festival's jury awarded the Palme d'Or not only to the director of Blue Is the Warmest Colour, Abdellatif Kechiche, but also to its two lead actresses, Léa Seydoux and Adèle Exarchopoulos

The most prestigious award given at Cannes is the Palme d'Or ("Golden Palm") for the best film.

- Main Competition
  - Palme d'Or – Golden Palm
  - Grand Prix – Grand Prize (2nd place)
  - Prix de la mise en scène – Best Director
  - Prix du Jury – Jury Prize (3rd place)
  - Prix d'interprétation masculine – Best Actor
  - Prix d'interprétation féminine – Best Actress
  - Prix du scénario – Best Screenplay
- Other Sections
  - Prix Un Certain Regard – Young talent, innovative and audacious works
  - Palme d'Or du court métrage – Best Short Film
  - Cinéfondation prizes – Student films
  - Caméra d'Or – It rewards the best first film of the Festival, choosing among the debutants' works among the Official Selection, the Directors' Fortnight and the International Critics' Week selections.
- Given by Independent Entities
  - FIPRESCI Prize – The International Federation of Film Critics awards prizes to films from the main competition section, Un Certain Regard and parallel sections
  - Directors' Fortnight Prizes
  - PRIX CST de l'Artiste Technicien – Awarded to a technical artist by the CST
  - International Critics' Week Prizes
  - Prize of the Ecumenical Jury
  - François Chalais Prize
  - L'Œil d'or – Best documentary film
  - Trophée Chopard
  - Palm Dog – Best canine performance
  - Queer Palm – Best LGBT-related films
  - Cannes Soundtrack Award
  - Pierre Angénieux Excellens in Cinematography
  - Women in Motion: Since 2015, award delivered by Kering and honouring major achievers in raising awareness around women's issues in the film industry.
  - The Mercedes-Benz Award was given from 1993 until 1999.

== Impact ==
The festival has become an important showcase for European films. Jill Forbes and Sarah Street argue in European Cinema: An Introduction (ISBN 0333752104), that Cannes "became...extremely important for critical and commercial interests and for European attempts to sell films on the basis of their artistic quality" (page 20). Forbes and Street also point out that, along with other festivals such as the Venice Film Festival and Berlin International Film Festival, Cannes offers an opportunity to determine a particular country's image of its cinema and generally foster the notion that European cinema is "art" cinema.

Additionally, given massive media exposure, the non-public festival is attended by many stars and is a popular venue for film producers to launch their new films and to attempt to sell their works to distributors.

=== Cannes Film Festival in fiction ===
Though most of the media attention the festival receives is journalistic in nature, the festival has been explored from the standpoint of fiction by novelists over the years.

Michael Grothaus' Epiphany Jones is a social satire about the festival and film industry and explores sex trafficking that occurs during the festival. The book was named one of the best Hollywood novels of all time by Entertainment Weekly. Iain Johnstone's Cannes: The Novel is a dystopian tale about terrorists holding the festival hostage.

Paulo Coelho's The Winner Stands Alone is also set at the festival.

The culture and history of the festival has been covered in a number of non-fiction books.

The festival has been used as the backdrop and setting of several films, including The Last Horror Film (1982), La cité de la peur (1994), Festival in Cannes (2001), Femme Fatale (2002) and Mr. Bean's Holiday (2007); some of these were shot on location at the festival.

== See also ==
- Directors' Fortnight
- International Critics' Week
- ACID
- List of Cannes Film Festival jury presidents
- List of Cannes Film Festival juries (Feature films)
- List of Cannes Film Festival records
- Marché du Film
- List of Big Three film festivals winners

== Media ==
- Footage from the 1946 Cannes Film Festival
- Retrospective footage of the Festival presented by INA in 2007
