= Joanna Brady =

Joanna Brady is the protagonist of a series of mystery novels by author J. A. Jance, centered on the small desert town of Bisbee, Arizona.

Joanna starts out as a mother of a 9-year-old Jenny and the wife of Andy Brady, who runs for Sheriff of Cochise County but is killed before the election and is then accused of being dirty. Joanna runs in his stead, clears his name, and wins the election to become sheriff, even though she does not have much background in law enforcement. On one hand, many people in the community are not used to having a woman in a position of power, which makes her job as sheriff somewhat more difficult, but, on the other hand, her relative independence from the old-boy network of local law enforcement makes it easier for her to clean house there as needed.

== Bibliography ==
Joanna Brady appears in the following novels:

- Desert Heat (1993) ISBN 0-380-76545-4
- Tombstone Courage (1994) ISBN 0-380-76546-2
- Shoot Don't Shoot (1995) ISBN 0-380-76548-9
- Dead to Rights (1996) ISBN 0-380-72432-4
- Skeleton Canyon (1997) ISBN 0-380-72433-2
- Rattlesnake Crossing(1998)
- Outlaw Mountain (1999) ISBN 0-380-79248-6
- Devil's Claw (2000) ISBN 0-380-79249-4
- Paradise Lost (2001) ISBN 0-380-80469-7
- Partner in Crime(2003) ISBN 0-380-80470-0
- Exit Wounds(2004) ISBN 0-380-80471-9
- Dead Wrong (2006) ISBN 0-06-054090-7
- Damage Control (2008) ISBN 0-060-74676-9
- Fire and Ice (with J.P. Beaumont) (2009) ISBN 978-0061239229
- Judgment Call ISBN 0061731161
