= The Complete Book of Science Fiction and Fantasy Lists =

1983 book by Malcolm Edwards and Maxim Jakubowski

First edition (publ. Granada) Cover artist: Ean Taylor

The Complete Book of Science Fiction and Fantasy Lists is a book written by Malcolm Edwards and Maxim Jakubowski and published in 1983.

== Contents ==
The Complete Book of Science Fiction and Fantasy Lists is a book of lists of science fiction and fantasy stories.

== Reception ==
Dave Langford reviewed The Complete Book of Science Fiction and Fantasy Lists for White Dwarf #48, and stated that "the book has shortcomings. It isn't, the editors admit, complete: they have enough material for another volume, while lots of jokier stuff was cut by Granada though not in the American edition. [...] Buy the book anyway."

Dave Pringle reviewed The Complete Book of Science Fiction and Fantasy Lists for Imagine magazine, and stated that "this volume is a mixture of the informative, the funny and the merely trivial."

== Reviews ==
- Review by Dan Chow in Locus, #274 November 1983
- Review by Nigel Richardson in Vector 117
- Review by Leo Doroschenko in Locus, #281 June 1984
- Review by Tom Easton in Analog Science Fiction/Science Fact, July 1984
- Review by Krzysztof Sokołowski in Fantastyka, 6/84, p. 59 [in Polish]
