= Murder One (bookshop) =

Well known bookshop in the Charing Cross Road from 1988 to 2009

Coordinates: 51.5127°N 0.1287°W

Murder One was a bookshop in the Charing Cross Road from 1988 to 2009, "catering to readers interested in hard-to-find and collectable crime, mystery, romance and science fiction literature". It was the first UK bookshop to specialize in the crime and mystery genres, and at its opening in 1988 the largest specialist "genre" bookshop in Europe. It was owned by the novelist Maxim Jakubowski.

The bookshop closed upon the owner's retirement in January 2009. The shop exists as a mail-order business, owned by a previous employee of the Murder One shop, Tanya Stone. Although the website was closed down, the business continues as a mail order business sending out PDFs of its quarterly crime catalogue. Murder One UK Ltd can be contacted by email.
