= Rosato & Associates =

Legal thriller series by Lisa Scottoline

Rosato & Associates is a series of legal thrillers by Lisa Scottoline. The books are about women who are partners at a law firm. The managing partner of the firm is Benedetta Rosato, but each book focuses on a different main character.

Several of the books have appeared on the New York Times Best Seller list.

== Books ==
Rosato & Associates

1. Everywhere That Mary Went (1993)
2. Legal Tender (1997)
3. Rough Justice (1998)
4. Mistaken Identity (1999)
5. Moment of Truth (2000)
6. The Vendetta Defense (2001)
7. Courting Trouble (2003)
8. Dead Ringer (2003)
9. Killer Smile (2004)
10. Lady Killer (2008)
11. Think Twice (2010)

Rosato & DiNunzio Novels

1. Accused (2013)
2. Betrayed (2014)
3. Corrupted (2015)
4. Damaged (2016)
5. Exposed (2017)
6. Feared (2018)
