= Charlotte MacLeod =

Canadian-American novelist (1922–2005)

- Born: Charlotte Matilda MacLeod; November 12, 1922; Bath, New Brunswick, Canada
- Died: 14 January 2005 (aged 82); Lewiston, Maine
- Occupation: Novelist
- Writing career
- Pen name: Alisa Craig
- Genre: Mystery
- Notable work: The Peter Shandy series

Charlotte MacLeod (November 12, 1922 – January 14, 2005) was a Canadian-American mystery fiction writer.

== Biography ==
Charlotte Matilda MacLeod was born in 1922 in Bath, New Brunswick, Canada, but emigrated to the United States in 1923 and became a naturalized US citizen in 1951. She attended the Art Institute of Boston. During the late 1940s and early 1950s, she worked as a copywriter for Stop & Shop Supermarkets in Boston. She eventually moved on to join the staff of N. H. Miller & Company, an advertising agency, where she rose to the level of vice president; she retired in 1982.

While continuing to work at the advertising company during the day, MacLeod began writing mystery fiction, eventually publishing over 30 novels. Many of her books are set in New England, including a series featuring university professor Peter Shandy, and another about Beacon Hill couple Sarah Kelling and Max Bittersohn. Other mysteries, set in Canada, were published under the pen name Alisa Craig.

MacLeod tailored her books to fit into the cozy mystery genre, i.e. avoiding too much violence, gore, or sex while featuring a humorous and literate-yet-light style, likable protagonists, and eccentric casts of secondary characters.

Her work sold over one million copies in the United States, Canada, and Japan. MacLeod was co-founder of the American Crime Writers League and served as president. She received a Nero Award for The Corpse in Oozak's Pond in 1987, which was also nominated for an Edgar Award.

MacLeod began writing at 6 a.m. each day, continued through the morning, then used the afternoon for rewrites. She only started new books on Sundays. Although described as a "true lady" and often seen with a hat and white gloves, she would, while writing, stay dressed in a bathrobe to avoid the temptation to leave the house for an errand.

MacLeod spent her final years in Maine. Toward the end of her years, she suffered from Alzheimer's disease. She died on January 14, 2005, at a nursing home in Lewiston, Maine.

== Awards ==
In 1998, MacLeod received the Malice Domestic Award for Lifetime Achievement.

Awards for MacLeod's writing
Year	Title	Award	Result	Ref.
1986	The Plain Old Man	Anthony Award for Best Novel	Finalist	
1987	The Corpse in Oozak’s Pond	Nero Award	Winner	
1988	The Corpse in Oozak’s Pond	Edgar Allan Poe Award for Best Novel	Finalist	
1989	“A Cozy For Christmas” in Mistletoe Mysteries	Agatha Award for Best Short Story	Finalist	
1989	Vane Pursuit	CWA Last Laugh Dagger Award	Finalist	
1992	An Owl Too Many	Agatha Award for Best Novel	Finalist	
1994	Had She But Known: Mary Roberts Rinehart	Agatha Award for Best Non-Fiction	Finalist	

== Published works ==
=== As Charlotte MacLeod ===
Mysteries starring Prof. Peter Shandy of (fictional) Balaclava Agricultural College & Helen Marsh Shandy, D.L.S.

- Rest You Merry (1979) [Revised and expanded from a short story, which became the opening chapter]
- The Luck Runs Out (1981)
- Wrack and Rune (1982)
- Something the Cat Dragged In (1984)
- The Curse of the Giant Hogweed (1985)
- The Corpse in Oozak's Pond (1987)
- Vane Pursuit (1989)
- An Owl Too Many (1991)
- Something in the Water (1994)
- Exit the Milkman (1996)

Mysteries starring Sarah Kelling (Bittersohn) and/or art investigator Max Bittersohn, set among Boston's upper crust

- The Family Vault (1980)
- The Withdrawing Room (1981)
- The Palace Guard (1982)
- The Bilbao Looking Glass (1983)
- The Convivial Codfish (1984)
- The Plain Old Man (1985)
- The Recycled Citizen (1988)
- The Silver Ghost (1988)
- The Gladstone Bag (1989)
- The Resurrection Man (1992)
- The Odd Job (1995)
- The Balloon Man (1998)

Stand-alone books

- Mystery of the White Knight (1964)
- Next Door to Danger (1965)
- The Fat Lady's Ghost (1968)
- Mouse's Vineyard (1968)
- Ask Me No Questions (1971)
- Brass Pounder (1971)
- King Devil (1978)
- We Dare Not Go A Hunting (1980)
- Cirak's Daughter (1982)
- Maid of Honor (1984)
- Grab Bag (1987) (short stories; including two featuring Bittersohn & Kelling, and one with Peter Shandy)
- It Was an Awful Shame and Other Stories (2002) (short stories; a reprint of Grab Bag including three additional stories, one featuring Bittersohn & Kelling)

Correspondence

- Charlotte MacLeod Remembered: Letters from Charlotte (collection)

As editor (anthologies)

- Christmas Stalkings
- Mistletoe Mysteries

Non-fiction

- Astrology for Skeptics (1973)
- Had She But Known: A Biography of Mary Roberts Rinehart (1994)

=== As Alisa Craig ===
Mysteries starring Madoc Rhys of the RCMP & Janet Wadman Rhys

- A Pint of Murder (1980)
- Murder Goes Mumming (1981)
- A Dismal Thing to Do (1986)
- Trouble in the Brasses (1989)
- The Wrong Rite (1992)

Mysteries starring Dittany Henbit Monk, of the Lobelia Falls Grub-and-Stakers Gardening & Roving Club

- The Grub-and-Stakers Move a Mountain (1981)
- The Grub-and-Stakers Quilt a Bee (1985)
- The Grub-and-Stakers Pinch a Poke (1988)
- The Grub-and-Stakers Spin a Yarn (1990)
- The Grub-and-Stakers House a Haunt (1993)

Stand-alone books

- The Terrible Tide (1985)
- Poems of Faith (1989)

== Awards and nominations ==
- Nero Award (1 win)
- Edgar Allan Poe Award (2 nominations)
- American Mystery Awards (5 wins)
- Bouchercon XXIII Lifetime Achievement Award
  - 1986 Anthony award nomination for Best Novel, The Plain Old Man
  - 1992 Anthony award nomination for Best Short Story Collection, Christmas Stalkings: Tales of Yuletide Murder
- Malice Domestic Lifetime Achievement Award
