= Virginia Rich =

American novelist

Virginia Rich (1914–1985) was an American author of culinary mysteries.

In three novels, written 1982 to 1985, she introduced amateur sleuth Eugenia Potter, a widow and chef who divided her time between a ranch in Arizona and a small town on the Maine coast. The books included recipes, the hallmark of what has come to be called "culinary mysteries."

Several years after Rich's death, her family approached mystery writer Nancy Pickard to complete an unfinished manuscript, producing The 27 Ingredient Chili Con Carne Murders, published in 1993. Pickard went on to write two more novels in the series, based on Rich's notes.

Rich was born in Sibley, Iowa. She wrote a food column for the Chicago Tribune under the name of Mary Meade, and served as food editor for Sunset magazine. She was married to cattleman Ray Rich. Like her heroine, she lived on a working cattle ranch near Tucson, Arizona and spent a number of months a year at her cottage off the coast of Maine. Her daughter Susan Sheridan Rich is an art teacher.

== Eugenia Potter mysteries ==
=== Written by Virginia Rich ===
- The Cooking School Murders (1982)
- The Baked Bean Supper Murders (1983)
- The Nantucket Diet Murders (1985)

=== Written by Nancy Pickard ===
- The 27 Ingredient Chili Con Carne Murders (1993)
- "The Potluck Supper Murders" (short story in the anthology Murder, They Wrote, 1997)
- The Blue Corn Murders (1998)
- The Secret Ingredient Murders (2001)

== See also ==
- List of female detective/mystery writers
- List of female detective characters
