= Pierre Lescure =

French journalist and television executive

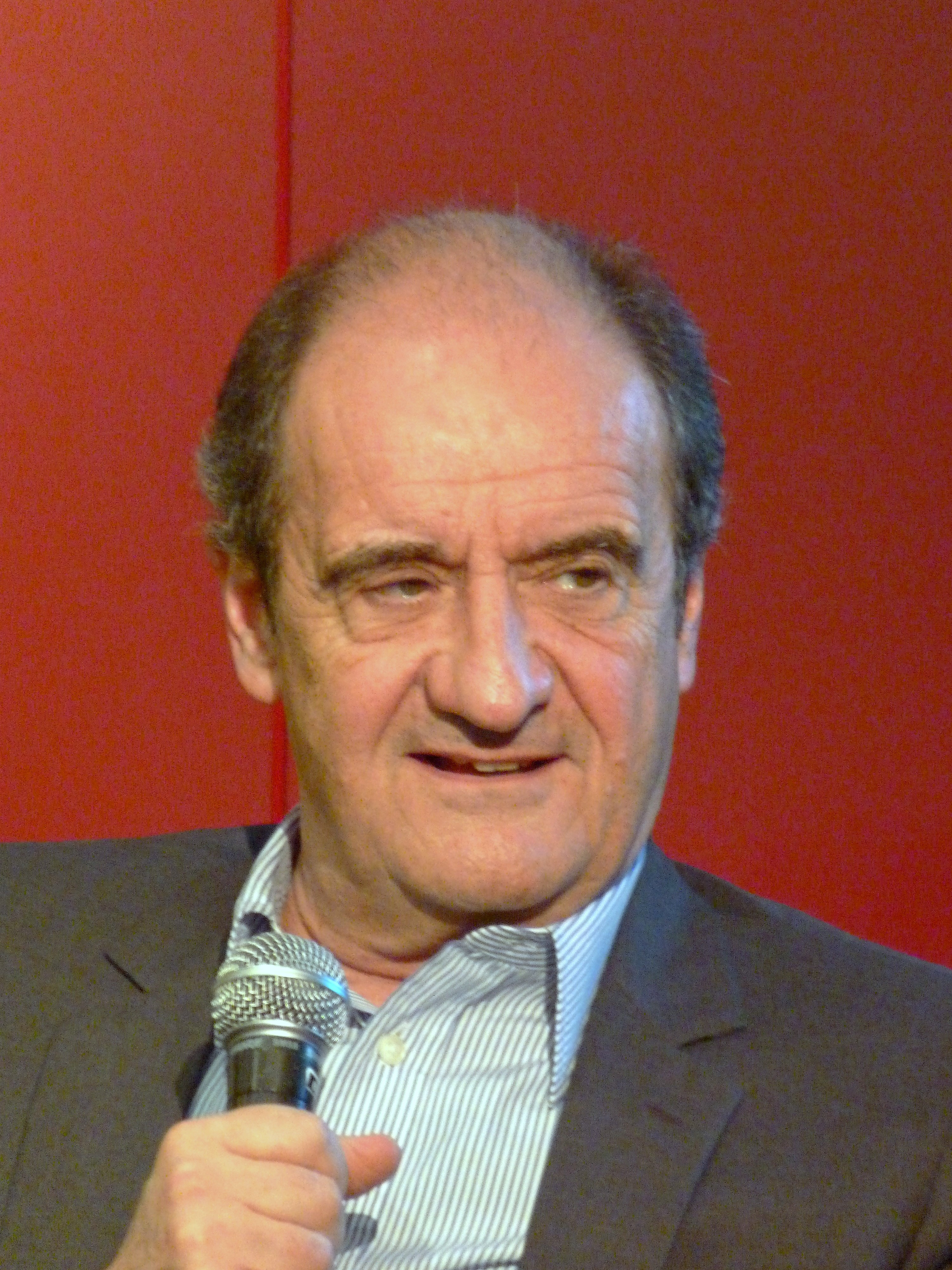
- Pierre Lescure in 2012
- Born: c. 1945; Paris, France
- Occupation: TV presenter
- Partner: Catherine Deneuve (1984–1991)

Pierre Lescure (French pronunciation: [pjɛʁ lɛskyʁ]; born c. 1945) is a French journalist and television executive. He is known for having founded the French TV music show Les Enfants du rock broadcast on public television from 1981 to 1988 and for having led the French Canal+ channel from its creation in 1984 to 2002. He was the president of the Cannes Film Festival from 2014 to 2022.

== Early life and education ==
Pierre Lescure was born around 1945 in Paris, France, the son of François Lescure, French Resistance member and journalist for the French communist daily newspaper L'Humanité, and the grandson of Pierre de Lescure, founder of the publishing house Les Éditions de Minuit. He grew up in Choisy-le-Roi.

He studied journalism at the Centre de formation des journalistes de Paris.

== Career ==
Lescure started his career at the radio station RTL, where he was reporter and news anchor from 1965 to 1968, and moved to RMC from 1968 to 1972.

He started working in television as a news anchor of the evening news program of the French public network Antenne 2. In 1981, he created the TV music show Les Enfants du rock.

He was founder of production company Canal+ Productions (later StudioCanal) and co-founder, with André Rousselet, of the company that started with the subscription TV channel Canal+ in 1984 and grew into Groupe Canal+. His friend Alain de Greef joined the company in 1986. Lescure was director-general/CEO until his ousting in 2002 after clashing with Jean-Marie Messier, chief executive of Vivendi, which had acquired the company. He proved very popular with media professionals and politicians during his time at Canal+.

He supported the candidacy of François Hollande during the 2012 French presidential election, and has led a mission about culture and media in his government.

He was appointed president of the Cannes Film Festival in 2014, leading the festival from 2015.

== Filmography ==
- 2008 : Musée haut, musée bas, directed by Jean-Michel Ribes
