= Say No to Murder =

1985 book by Nancy Pickard

- First edition (publ. Avon Books)
- Author: Nancy Pickard
- Genre: Mystery fiction
- Published: 1985
- Publisher: Pocket Books
- Pages: 224
- Awards: Anthony Award for Best Paperback Original (1986)
- ISBN: 978-1-416-58689-0
- Website: Say No to Murder

Say No to Murder is a book written by Nancy Pickard and published by Pocket Books, which later went on to win the Anthony Award for Best Paperback Original in 1986.
