= 100 Great Detectives =

1991 book by Maxim Jakubowski

- First edition
- Author: Maxim Jakubowski
- Genre: Mystery
- Published: 1991
- Publisher: Carroll & Graf Publishers
- Pages: 255
- Awards: Anthony Award for Best Critical Work (1992)
- ISBN: 978-0-881-84920-2

100 Great Detectives is a non-fiction book by English writer Maxim Jakubowski. Its original title was 100 Great Detectives or the Detective Directory and was published by Carroll & Graf Publishers on 1 January 1991.

100 Great Detectives later went on to win the Anthony Award for Best Critical Work in 1992.
