= Militarization of the internet =

Use of the Internet for state security

Internet militarization is the use of the Internet and its platforms by states in order to ensure state security domestically as well as protect itself from any external attack. Over time, the co-constitution of state’s strategies and technologies has allowed states to protect themselves from attacks on their political interests as well.

== Motivations ==
=== Domestic ===
Militarization of the internet is used by many states to try to insulate their citizens from other sources of information. By privatizing the internet within a country, the state can reinforce their own ideas and propaganda to their citizens without outside news sources or platforms attempting to provide different information.

=== National security ===
Militarizing the internet can also create the ability for states to interfere with other state's functions. Because the internet is a public domain, states have the ability to interfere with elections using online resources, promote propaganda, and overall disrupt national security for other countries.

== Case studies ==
=== Domestic ===
==== Bahrain ====
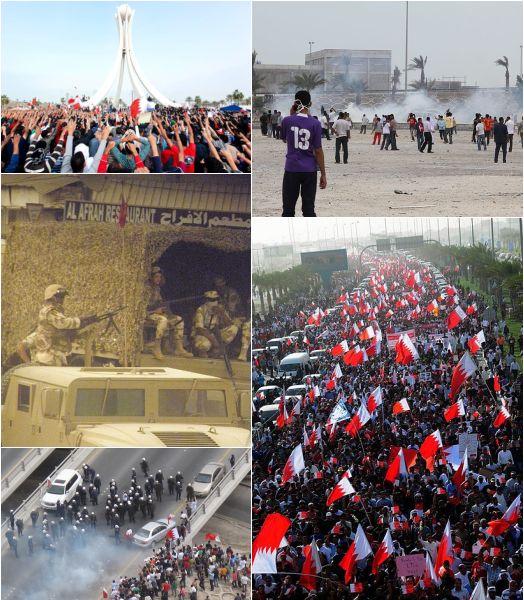
A collage of the Bahrain Uprising.

During the Bahraini uprising of 2011, the Bahraini government used social media posts immensely in an attempt to end the uprising. During the uprising, the government was monitoring the use of the internet by its citizens, and punishing those that visited articles or liked Facebook pages relating to the uprising. During this time, at least 47 students were dismissed from Bahrain Polytechnic for ‘participating in unlicensed gatherings and marches’. This was ‘based on evidence mostly obtained from social media pages like Facebook.’ The government participated in passive observation of different social media accounts, and then used their military to stop those that aligned themselves with the views of the protests.

==== China ====
The Chinese government has a very tight grasp on internet usage within the country. By using censors, the government has the ability to block out any information that may disagree with the Communist Party. However, it is more often that the government will not outright censor these posts, but rather monitor where they are being posted from. The censors were extremely likely to monitor and block posts that were "tending towards action" within the country, in order to prevent uprisings or protests. The censors were also likely to block or censor pages of people that support actions and protests against the country of China in order to not spread their ideas further.

China has taken a “multilateral pluralism based on cyber sovereignty” approach when it comes to global Internet governance. As China’s internet use developed, the government began to instill strict rules and regulations surrounding “internet infrastructure, commercial and social use, and its potential political ramifications. China has instituted a Social Credit System (SCS) for its public internet users, aimed to track the “creditworthiness” and “trustworthiness” of both individuals and organizations utilizing cyberspace. The points either gained or lost through this program resulted in either benefits or punishments determined by the government. This system added an additional layer to the state surveillance and censorship already in place within the country.

==== Islamic State ====
Social media quickly became a weapon utilized by various organizations in addition to global governments. Islamic State is a prominent group that has utilized the power and range of social media as a means of broadcasting their “invasions” to reach different demographics, a skill seen primarily in the ISIS invasion of Iraq. ISIS began their invasion of Iraq in 2014, primarily focused on the acquisition of the city of Mosul. Approximately 1,500 ISIS fighters entered Northern Iraq, a fact known through their continuous broadcast on various social media platforms. This particular use of social media quickly sparked a global conversation surrounding the weaponization of social media as a fear tactic. Instead of keeping the details surrounding their conquests and invasions confidential, ISIS wanted the world aware of every move they made as a way to instill fear into Iraq’s military. Thousands of fans and “Twitter botnets” created hashtags, the most well-known being #AllEyesOnISIS, as a means of spreading information, images, videos, and propaganda documenting the towns and cities they overtook. The propaganda quickly spread throughout Arabic-speaking Twitter, contributing to the existing fear felt amongst those within the region, with a particular emphasis on those residing in Mosul. This “contagion of fear” resulted in approximately 30,000 Iraqi soldiers, along with the vast majority of Mosul’s population, to flee, resulting in what has been referred to as ISIS’s “propaganda victory.” The ability of organizations to rewrite their personal narratives and manufacture a picture of defeat for national armed forces is quickly shifting the construct of the battlefield and the ways in which war is conducted and fought.

==== Russia ====
In order to insulate their citizens from outside news sources, Russia created their own, monitored internet in the country. To do so, the state blocked and delegitimized news outlets that held opposing thoughts to their Prime Minister, Vladimir Putin, as well as the ideas within his party. This "parallel internet" while not completely insular, allows the government to screen what is seen by its citizens, as well as gives them the ability to shut down the government when threatened with an internet attack.

=== National security ===
==== Japan ====
Japan started to revitalize their militarization of cyberspace after a series of online attacks from January 2000 – 2010, with these attacks escalating until 2015. Originally, the Japanese government started with securitization over a 15-year period by implementing different security systems within their internet. However, as internet has been used more within the military, the Japanese government turned towards militarization. To do so, the government assigned three specifics tasks to three different sections of the military. The National Police Agency prosecutes cyberattacks that are seen as crimes, the Japanese Ministry of Defense is responsible for the state's networks, and the National Security Bureau of the NPA which, in conjunction with the Defense Intelligence Headquarters, divide specific intelligence issues. The Crisis Management Center, the Cabinet Intelligence Research Office, and the National Information Security Center. All of these groups work together, within Japan's government, to regulate what is seen on the Internet, whether it be outside content or political differences within the country. From 2015 onward, especially with the Tokyo 2021 Olympics, internet militarization has become an integral part of the country's overall approach to state security.

==== United States ====
Beginning with the United States invasion of Iraq in 2003, states have been in direct competition with each other in order to gain an advantage in cyberspace. The United States government gave out tens of billions of dollars in contracts to private firms, such as Lockheed Martin and Raytheon to develop technologies. Other nations such as China have attempted to match the U.S spending, both nations are in a race to develop the first fully autonomous AI weapons system.
