= Twenty Houses of the Zodiac =

1979 anthology edited by Maxim Jakubowski

- Author: ed. by Maxim Jakubowski.
- Cover artist: Tim White
- Language: English
- Genre: Science fiction collection
- Publisher: New English Library
- Publication date: July 1979
- Publication place: United Kingdom
- Media type: Print (paperback)
- Pages: 240 pages
- ISBN: 0450043339

Twenty Houses of the Zodiac is a 1979 English-language anthology of twenty science fiction short stories, many of them translated into English, for the 37th World Science Fiction Convention (or Worldcon). It was edited by Maxim Jakubowski and published by New English Library. Many of the included writers had never previously had their work translated into English. The majority of the English translations are unique to the anthology and were not previously or subsequently printed. It includes an introductory essay by Jakubowski.

== Contents ==
- "Oh, For a Closer Brush with God" (a.k.a. "Bill Carter Takes Over") (1979) - a short story by Brian W. Aldiss. It was reprinted under the variant title in A Romance of the Equator: The Best Fantasy Stories of Brian W. Aldiss (1989).
- "A Kind of Space" (originally "Un Fel de Spatiu"_ (1974) - A short storyby Ion Hobana and translated by Maxim Jakubowksi and "Sonia Florens" (Dolorès Jakubowski). It had originally been printed in the Romanian magazine Viața Românească in 1974.
- "'Dealers in Light and Darkness" (1979) - A short story by Cherry Wilder
- "A Hole in Time" (originally "Der Riss in der Zeit") (1979) - A short story by Gerd Maximovic translated from German by David Britt.
- "High Tide" (originally 'Maree Haute") (1978) - A short story by Élisabeth Vonarburg and translated from French by Maxim Jakubowksi. It had previously been published in Requiem #19 (1978), a Canadian magazine.
- I Can Teleport Myse-f to Anywhere (1979) - A short story by Robert Sheckley.
- "Heavier Than Sleep" (originally "Plus Lourd Que le Sommeil") (1979) - A short story by Philippe Curval
- "An Avocado Pear for Dolorès" ("Un Avocat pour Dolorès") (1979) - A short story by Adam Barnett-Foster (a pen name of Maxim Jakubowski) and translated from French by "Sonia Florens" (Dolorès Jakubowski).
- "The Gigantic Fluctuation" ("Gigantskaya Flyuctuatsiya") (1962) - A short story written by Arkady and Boris Strugatsky and translated from Russian by Gladys Evans. It had first been published as part of the Strugatsky brothers' novel Stazhery ("The Probationers", a.ka.A "Space Apprentice") (Young Guard publishing house; 1962). It was later reprinted separately from the novel in the Russian anthology Journey Across Three Worlds (Mir; 1973).
- "Zodiac 2000" (1978) - A short story by J. G. Ballard. It had previously been published in Ambit #75 (1978).
- "A Sunrise" ("Een Zonsopgang") (1963) - A short story written by Belgian poet Hugo Raes and translated from Flemish by R. B. Powell. It had previously been published in Vandaag #10 (1963), a Dutch magazine.
- "Love Keys" ("Ai no Kagi") (1958) - A short story written by Shinichi Hoshi and translated from Japanese by Noriyoshi Saito and Maxim Jakubowksi. It had been first published in the Japanese science fiction magazine Uchūjin in 1958.
- "The Cottage of Eternity" (1979) - A novelette by Bob Shaw.
- "Ice Two" (1979) - A short story written by Daniel Walther and translated from French by Maxim Jakubowksi. (Both French and English versions have the same title.)
- "The Brass Monkey" (1979) - A short story by John Sladek.
- "The Alabaster Garden" ("El Jardin de Alabastro") (1977) - A short story by Spanish author Teresa Inglés and translated from the Spanish by Maxim Jakubowksi. It had been previously printed in Nueva Dimension No. 86 (February, 1977), a Spanish-language science fiction and fantasy magazine printed by Ediciones Dronte.
- "'Idiosyncrasies" (1979) - A short story by Maxim Jakubowski.
- "Take Me Down the River" (1979) - A short story by Sam Lundwall
- "The White Death" ("Biała śmierć") (from Lem's collection Bajki Robotów or Fables for Robots (1964) - A short story written by Stanislaw Lem and translated by Michael Kandel. A race of intelligent robots hide from Humanity by digging a beautiful city under the surface of their planet. When a rocket crashes into the surface, they quickly destroy it to keep curious and violent Humans away. However, the only surviving life-form aboard - The White Death - will soon be the end of them.
- "Crossing into Cambodia" (1979) - A short story by Michael Moorcock. A Russian political officer travels with a Cossack cavalry troop into Cambodia during World War 3. It was reprinted in Moorcock's collection My Experiences in the Third World War (Savoy; 1980) and elsewhere.

ISBN 0450043339 / 9780450043338
