= Lisa Scottoline =

American writer (born 1955)

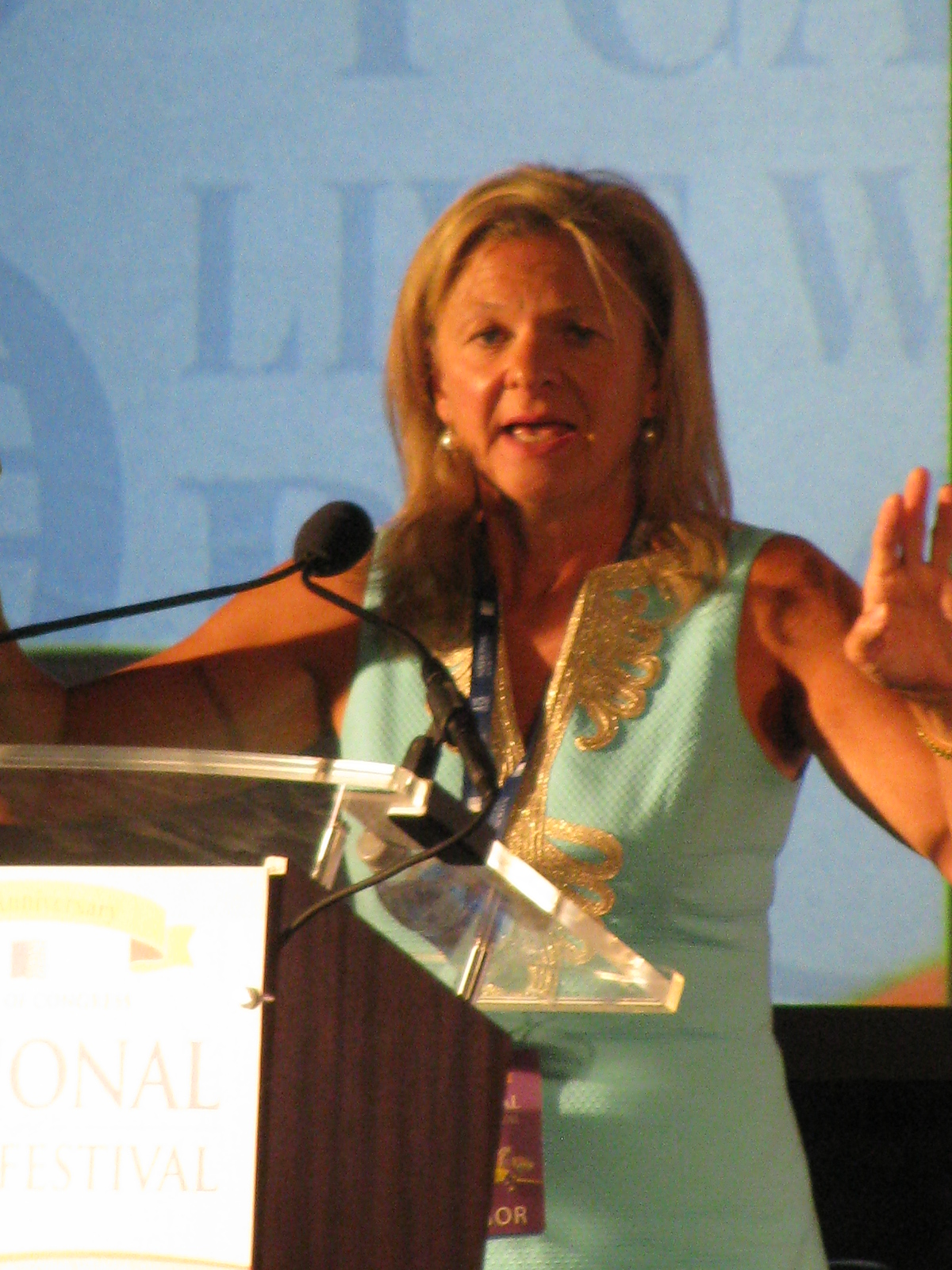
- Born: July 1, 1955 (age 71); Philadelphia, Pennsylvania, U.S.
- Education: University of Pennsylvania (BA); University of Pennsylvania Law School
- Occupations: Lawyer, author
- Writing career
- Genres: Fiction, legal thrillers

Lisa Scottoline (/ˌskɒtəˈliːni/; born July 1, 1955) is an American author of legal thrillers.

== Life ==
Born in the Lower Moyamensing neighborhood of Philadelphia, Scottoline attended Lower Merion High School and then went on to earn a B.A. in English magna cum laude (in three years) from the University of Pennsylvania, then graduated cum laude from the University of Pennsylvania Law School. She clerked for judges at the state and federal appellate courts and later became a litigator at Dechert in Philadelphia. After the birth of her daughter, she left the law firm and started writing. Final Appeal received an Edgar Award, for excellence in crime fiction. She has since written 30 bestselling novels, including Look Again and Don't Go, both which reached number two on The New York Times Best Seller list. She has served as President of the Mystery Writers of America and won many other honors. Her novels have been translated into 30 languages and she has 30 million copies in print.

Since March 2007, Scottoline and her daughter Francesca Serritella have been writing the "Chick Wit" column for The Philadelphia Inquirer. A collection of those humorous nonfiction columns has been published in a series of bestselling books co-written with her daughter Francesca Serritella, the first of which is entitled Why My Third Husband Will Be A Dog: The Amazing Adventures of an Ordinary Woman and published on November 24, 2009.

== Books ==
=== Rosato & Associates ===
1. Everywhere That Mary Went (1993)
2. Legal Tender (1996)
3. Rough Justice (1997)
4. Mistaken Identity (1998)
5. Moment of Truth (2000) – #10 on The NYT Best Seller list and on the list for six weeks.
6. The Vendetta Defense (2001) – #7 on NYT Bestseller list and on the list for five weeks.
7. Courting Trouble (2003) – #8 on NYT Bestseller list and on the list for three weeks.
8. Dead Ringer (2003) – #5 on NYT Bestseller list and on the list for four weeks.
9. Killer Smile (2004) – #14 on NYT Bestseller list and on the list for two weeks.
10. Lady Killer (2008) – #4 on NYT Bestseller list and on the list for four weeks.
11. Think Twice (2010) – #4 on NYT Bestseller list and on the list for three weeks.

=== Rosato & DiNunzio Novels ===
1. Accused. St. Martin's Press. October 29, 2013. ISBN 978-1-250-02765-8.
2. Betrayed. St. Martin's Press. November 25, 2014. ISBN 978-1-250-02768-9.
3. Corrupted. St. Martin's Press. October 10, 2015. ISBN 978-1-250-02793-1.
4. Damaged. St. Martin's Press. August 16, 2016. ISBN 978-1-250-09962-4.
5. Exposed. St. Martin's Press. August 15, 2017. ISBN 978-1-250-09971-6.
6. Feared. St. Martin's Press. August 14, 2018. ISBN 978-1-250-09959-4.

=== Standalone fiction ===
- Final Appeal (1994) – Winner of the 1995 Edgar Award for "Best Paperback Original Mystery."
- Running From the Law (1995), winner of the Edgar Allan Poe Award 1995.
- Devil's Corner (2005) – #9 on NYT Bestseller list and on the list for two weeks.
- Dirty Blonde (2006) – #5 on NYT Bestseller list and on the list for four weeks.
- Daddy's Girl (2007)- #3 on NYT Bestseller list for two consecutive weeks and on the list for three weeks.
  Appeared in the 2007 Reader's Digest Select Editions Volume 294 – #6.
- Look Again. St. Martin's Press. April 1, 2010. ISBN 978-1-4299-9161-2. – #2 on NYT Bestseller list and on the list for three weeks.
- Save Me: A Novel. St. Martin's Press. April 12, 2011. ISBN 978-1-4299-5979-7. – #7 on NYT Bestseller list and on the list for four weeks.
- Come Home (2012, St. Martin's Press) – #4 on NYT Bestseller list and on the list for three weeks.
- Don't Go. St. Martin's Press. April 9, 2013. ISBN 978-1-250-02599-9. – #2 on NYT Bestseller list and on the list for three weeks.
- Keep Quiet (2014, St. Martin's Press)
- Every Fifteen Minutes (2015, St. Martin's Press)
- Most Wanted (2016, St. Martin's Press)
- One Perfect Lie (2017, St. Martin's Press)
- After Anna (2018, St. Martin's Press)
- Someone Knows (April 9, 2019, G. P. Putnam's Sons)
- Eternal (March 23, 2021, Penguin Publishing Group)
- What Happened to the Bennetts (2022, Penguin Random House)
- Loyalty (2023, G.P. Putnam’s Sons)
- The Truth About the Devlins (2024, G.P. Putnam's Sons)

=== Serial novels contributed to ===
- Naked Came the Phoenix (2001)
- Natural Suspect (2001) (ISBN 0-345-43769-1)
- The Chopin Manuscript (2008) – The first book of the "Harold Middleton" series. Initial release was as an audiobook. (ISBN 1-4233-7907-1)
- The Copper Bracelet (2010) – The second book of the "Harold Middleton" series. (ISBN 1-60285-731-8)
- Watchlist (2010) is an omnibus of The Chopin Manuscript (2008) and The Copper Bracelet (2010) (ISBN 1-59315-559-X)
- No Rest for the Dead (2011) (ISBN 1-4516-0737-7)

=== Nonfiction ===
- Why My Third Husband Will Be A Dog: The Amazing Adventures of an Ordinary Woman (2009, St. Martin's Press)
- My Nest Isn't Empty, It Just Has More Closet Space, with Francesca Serritella (2010, St. Martin's Press)
- Best Friends, Occasional Enemies: The Lighter Side of Life as a Mother and Daughter, with Francesca Serritella (2011, St. Martin's Press)
- Happy and Merry, with Francesca Serritella (2012, St. Martin's Press) [e-book]
- Meet Me at Emotional Baggage Claim, with Francesca Serritella (2012, St. Martin's Press)
- Have a Nice Guilt Trip, with Francesca Serritella (2014, St. Martin's Press)
- Does This Beach Make Me Look Fat?: True Stories and Confessions, with Francesca Serritella (2015, St. Martin's Press)
- I've Got Sand In All the Wrong Places, with Francesca Serritella (2016, St. Martin's Press)
- I Need a Lifeguard Everywhere But the Pool, with Francesca Serritella (2017, St. Martin's Press)
- I See Life Through Rose-Colored Glasses, with Francesca Serritella (2018, St. Martin's Press)
