= Perri O'Shaughnessy =

American author duo

Perri O'Shaughnessy is the pen name of the authors Mary and Pamela O'Shaughnessy, sisters who live in Northern California. Pamela, a Harvard Law School graduate, was a trial lawyer for sixteen years. Mary is a former editor and writer for multimedia projects. Their novels have been translated into many languages including Dutch, German, Bulgarian, French, Spanish, and Japanese. Several have been New York Times bestsellers.

== Published books ==
Nina Reilly novels

- Motion to Suppress, 1995
- Invasion of Privacy, 1996
- Obstruction of Justice, 1997
- Breach of Promise, 1998
- Acts of Malice, 1999
- Move to Strike, 2000
- Writ of Execution, 2001
- Unfit to Practice, 2002
- Presumption of Death, 2003
- Unlucky in Law, 2004
- Case of Lies, 2005
- Show No Fear, 2008
- Dreams of the Dead, 2011

Other

- Sinister Shorts, 2006, collection of short stories
- Keeper of the Keys, 2007, novel
