= J. A. Jance =

American writer

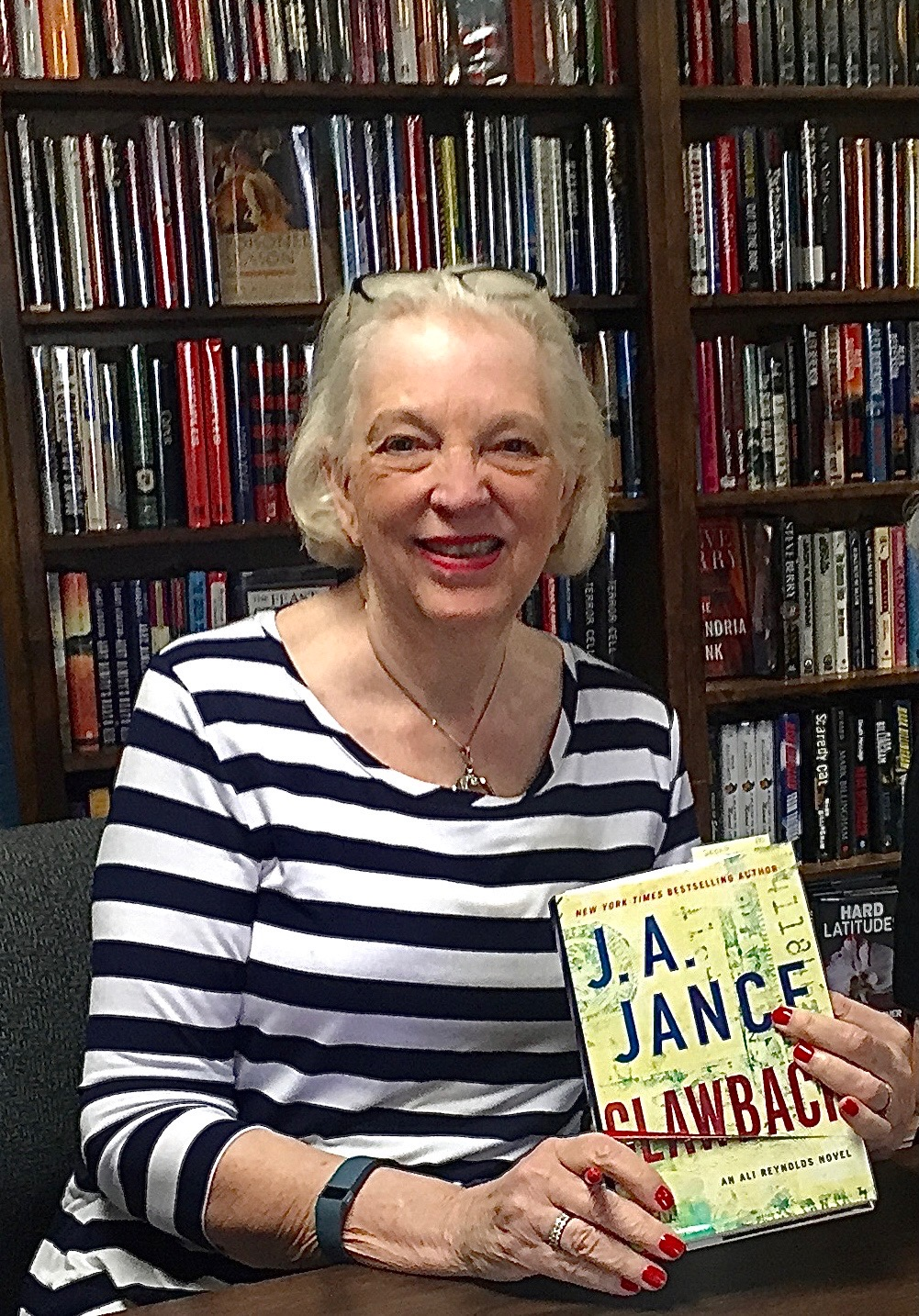
- Jance with her book Clawback, February 2021
- Born: October 27, 1944 (age 81); Watertown, South Dakota, U.S.
- Education: University of Arizona
- Occupation: Author
- Writing career
- Genre: Mystery fiction

Judith Ann (J. A.) Jance (born October 27, 1944) is an American author of mystery novels. She writes three series of novels, centering on retired Seattle Police Department Detective J. P. Beaumont, Arizona County Sheriff Joanna Brady, and former Los Angeles news anchor turned mystery solver Ali Reynolds. The Beaumont and Brady series intersect in the novel Partner in Crime, which is both the 16th Beaumount mystery and the 10th Brady mystery. They intersect again in Fire and Ice.

== Biography ==
Jance was born in Watertown, South Dakota, and raised in Bisbee, Arizona (the setting for her Joanna Brady series of novels). Before becoming an author, she worked as a school librarian on a Native American reservation (Tohono O'Odham), and as a teacher and insurance agent.

Jance attended University of Arizona, graduating with a bachelor's degree in education in 1966, then a master's in library science in 1970. In 2000, University of Arizona awarded Jance an honorary doctorate.

In July 2018, The Strand Magazine gave Jance its Lifetime Achievement Award to recognize her contributions to the field of crime fiction.

She lives part of the year in Arizona and part of the year in Seattle. Jance uses her initials for her pen name because a publisher told her that disclosing her gender would be a liability for a book about a male detective.

== Books ==
=== J. P. Beaumont ===
1. Until Proven Guilty (1985) ISBN 0-380-89638-9
2. Injustice for All (1986) ISBN 0-380-89641-9
3. Trial by Fury (1986) ISBN 0-380-75138-0
  (nominated for: 1987 Anthony Award for "Best Paperback Original")
4. Taking the Fifth (1987) ISBN 0-380-75139-9
5. Improbable Cause (1987) ISBN 0-380-75412-6
6. A More Perfect Union (1988) ISBN 0-380-75413-4
7. Dismissed with Prejudice (1989) ISBN 0-380-75547-5
8. Minor in Possession (1990) ISBN 0-380-75546-7
9. Payment in Kind (1991) ISBN 0-380-75836-9
10. Without Due Process (1993) ISBN 0-380-75837-7
11. Failure to Appear (1994) ISBN 0-380-75839-3
12. Lying in Wait (1995) ISBN 0-380-71841-3
13. Name Withheld (1997) ISBN 0-380-71842-1
14. Breach of Duty (1999) ISBN 978-0-380-71843-6
15. Birds of Prey (2002) ISBN 0-380-71654-2
16. Partner in Crime (2003) ISBN 0-380-80470-0 (Joanna Brady crossover)
17. Long Time Gone (2005) ISBN 0-688-13824-1
18. Justice Denied (2007) ISBN 978-0-06-054092-0
19. Fire and Ice (2009) ISBN 978-0-06-123922-9 (Joanna Brady crossover)
20. Betrayal of Trust (2011) ISBN 978-0-06-173115-0
21. Ring in the Dead (novella, 2013) ISBN 978-0062294821
22. Second Watch (2013) ISBN 978-0062134677
23. Stand Down (novella, 2015) ISBN 0062418491
24. Dance of the Bones (2015) (Brandon Walker crossover)
25. Still Dead (novella, 2017) ISBN 9780062835970
26. Proof of Life (2017)
27. Sins Of The Fathers (2019) ISBN 978-0-06-285344-8
28. Nothing to Lose (2022) ISBN 978-0063010062
29. Girls Night Out (short story, 2024)
30. Den of Iniquity (2024) ISBN 978-0063252585

=== Walker Family Mysteries ===
1. Hour of the Hunter (1991) ISBN 0-380-71107-9
  (nominated for: 1992 Anthony Award for "Best Paperback Original")
2. Kiss of the Bees (2001) ISBN 0-380-80599-5
3. Day of the Dead (2004) ISBN 0688138233
4. Queen of the Night (2010) ISBN 978-0-06-123924-3
5. Dance of the Bones (2015) (J.P. Beaumont crossover)

=== Joanna Brady series ===
1. Desert Heat (1993) ISBN 0-380-76545-4
2. Tombstone Courage (1995) ISBN 0-380-76546-2
3. Shoot/Don't Shoot (1996) ISBN 0-380-76548-9
4. Dead to Rights (1997) ISBN 0-380-97394-4
5. Skeleton Canyon (1998) ISBN 0-380-97395-2
6. Rattlesnake Crossing (1998) ISBN 0-380-79247-8
7. Outlaw Mountain (2000) ISBN 0-380-79248-6
8. Devil’s Claw (2001) ISBN 0-380-79249-4
9. Paradise Lost (2002) ISBN 0-380-80469-7
10. Partner in Crime (2003) ISBN 0-380-80470-0 (J.P. Beaumont crossover)
11. Exit Wounds (2004) ISBN 0-380-80471-9
12. Dead Wrong (2006) ISBN 0-06-054090-7
13. Damage Control (2008) ISBN 0-06-074676-9
14. Fire and Ice (2009) ISBN 978-0-06-123922-9 (J.P. Beaumont crossover)
15. Judgment Call (2012) ISBN 978-0061731167
16. The Old Blue Line (novella, 2014) ISBN 978-0062366924
17. Remains of Innocence (2014) ISBN 978-0062134707
18. No Honor Among Thieves (novella, 2015) (Ali Reynolds crossover)
19. Random Acts (novella, 2016) (Ali Reynolds crossover)
20. Downfall (2016) ISBN 978-0062297730
21. Field of Bones (2018)
22. Missing And Endangered (2021)
23. Blessing of the Lost Girls (2023)

=== Ali Reynolds books ===
1. Edge of Evil (2006) ISBN 0-7278-6382-7
2. Web of Evil (2007) ISBN 978-1-4165-3773-1
3. Hand of Evil (2007) ISBN 1-4165-3753-8
4. Cruel Intent (2008) ISBN 1-4165-6379-2
5. Trial By Fire (2009) ISBN 1-4165-6380-6
6. Fatal Error (2011) ISBN 1-4165-6381-4
7. Left for Dead (2012) ISBN 978-1451628586
8. Deadly Stakes (2013) ISBN 978-1451628685
9. Moving Target (2014) ISBN 978-1476745008
10. A Last Goodbye (novella, 2014)
11. Cold Betrayal (2015) ISBN 978-1476745046
12. No Honor Among Thieves (novella, 2015) (Joanna Brady crossover)
13. Clawback (2016) ISBN 978-1501110726
14. Random Acts (novella, 2016) (Joanna Brady crossover)
15. Man Overboard (2017) ISBN 978-1501110801
16. Duel to the Death (2018) ISBN 978-1501150982
17. The A List (2019) ISBN 978-1501151019
18. Credible Threat (2020) ISBN 978-1982131074
19. Unfinished Business (2021) ISBN 978-1982131111
20. Collateral Damage (2023) ISBN 978-1-9821-8915-0

=== Poetry collection ===
- After the Fire (1984) ISBN 1-931583-04-8
