= Maxim Jakubowski =

British writer

- Born: Nov 3 1944
- Occupation: Author of novels
- Writing career
- Genres: Crime Erotica and Science Fiction
- Notable awards: 2019 CWA Red Herring Award for lifetime achievement

Maxim Jakubowski (born 1944) is an English writer of crime fiction, erotica, and science fiction, and also a rock music critic.

Jakubowski was born in 1944 in England to Russo-British and Polish parents and raised in France. Jakubowski edited the science fiction anthologies Twenty Houses of the Zodiac (1979), for the 37th World Science Fiction Convention (Seacon '79) in Brighton, and Travelling Towards Epsilon, an anthology of French science fiction. He also contributed a short story to that anthology. He has edited works on Jack the Ripper. He is also a reviewer having had columns in Time Out London, The Guardian and Crime Time.

== Murder One Bookstore ==
He has worked in book publishing for many years, with managerial positions in the Virgin Group, Penguin and the Hearst Group and left following a long career to open the Murder One bookshop, the UK's first specialist crime and mystery bookstore. The store closed in 2009, a victim of the internet according to Jakubowski.

== Novels ==
His novels include It's You that I Want to Kiss, Because She Thought She Loved Me, The State of Montana, On Tenderness Express, Kiss Me Sadly, Confessions of a Romantic Pornographer,I Was Waiting for You,' The Louisiana Republic', 'The Piper's Dance', 'Just a Girl With a Gun' and 'The Exopotamia Manuscript'. His short story collections include Life in the World of Women, Fools for Lust, 'Death Has Thousand Faces', 'The Coast of Nostalgia' (and the collaborative American Casanova). He is a regular broadcaster on British TV and radio and was voted the fourth Sexiest Writer of 2007 in a poll on the Crimespace website. Ekaterina and the Night were published in 2011 and combined crime with erotica, as does 'The Louisiana Republic' (2018). His latest novels are 'The Piper's Dance' (2021), a fantasy,'Just a Girl with a Gun' (2023), a noir thriller, 'The Exopotamia Manuscript' (2024) and 'Manhattan Death Ballad' (2025), a companion piece to 'Just A Girl with a Gun'.

For many years, Jakubowski was Chair of the Arthur C. Clarke Award and is now chair and judge for the Crime Writers' Association International Dagger; he is also on the committee of the Crime Writers' Association and a frequent commentator on radio and TV. He is a past chair of the Crime Writers' Association. and now serves as its Vice Chair.

In October 2019, he was awarded the CWA Red Herrings Award for lifetime achievement. He has also won the Karel Award for contribution to European science fiction and the Anthony Award at the Toronto Bouchercon for a best non-fiction book of the year for 'One Hundred Great Detectives'. In November 2024 he was presented with the David L Goodis Award at Noircon.

In 2025, he will act as Executive Producer for the 'Factory' TV series, based on the novels of Derek Raymond, being produced by the FX Network and Hardy, Son and Baker (Taboo and A Christmas Carol).

Since April 2024, he has been editor-at-large for Bedford Square Publishers/No Exit Press.

=== Other writings ===
He wrote the short story "Un Avocat pour Dolorès" under the pen name of "Adam Barnett-Foster". His stories have featured in over forty anthologies.

Jakubowski also wrote a number of books on rock music during the 1980s.

He is also a well-known critic and reviewer, having written a crime review column for Time Out, London for 10 years and the Guardian for a further 11 years, ending in 2010. His column then moved online to Love Reading and has been since 2017 on Crime Time. His non-fiction book 'Following the Detectives' was shortlisted for several awards in the mystery field.

It was revealed in The Guardian in January 2020 that he was one of two authors behind the pseudonymous Vina Jackson, who between 2010 and 2011 wrote a series of ten bestselling romantic erotica novels under the 'Eighty Days' brand which reached the Sunday Times bestseller list on several occasions and were published in 31 countries.

== Select bibliography ==
=== As author ===
- with Edwards, Malcolm. The Complete Book of Science Fiction and Fantasy Lists. St Albans, Herts, UK: Granada Publishing Ltd., 1983. 350 pages. ISBN 0-586-05678-5.

=== As editor ===
- Twenty Houses of the Zodiac. New English Library, 1979. 237 pages. ISBN 0450043339
- 100 Great Detectives. Carroll & Graf, 1991. 255 pages. ISBN 0881847291
  Won 1992 Anthony Award for Best Critical Work
- Jack the Ripper: Comprehensive A-Z. Castle Books, 2005. ISBN 978-0785816164
- London Noir. Serpent's Tail, 1994. 264 pages. ISBN 1852423080
  Nominated 1995 Anthony Award for Best Anthology / Short Story Collection
- Past Poisons: An Ellis Peters Memorial Anthology of Historical Crime. Ibooks, Inc. Anthology edition, 2005. 356 pages. ISBN 1-59687-160-1.#
- The Mammoth Book of Jack the Ripper. Robinson Publishing, 2008. ISBN 978-1845297121

=== Anthologies of erotic fiction ===
- The Mammoth Book of Erotica (Carroll & Graf US and Robinson UK, originally published in 1994, revised edition published in 2000) ISBN 0-7867-0787-9

=== Anthologies of erotic photography ===
- The Mammoth Book of Illustrated Erotica, co-edited with Marilyn Jaye Lewis, Running Press, 2002, ISBN 0-7867-0921-9
- The Mammoth Book of Erotic Photography, co-edited with Marilyn Jaye Lewis, Edition Olms, 2004, ISBN 3-283-00431-5

A full bibliography, numbering well over 120 books, can be found on his website www.maximjakubowski.co.uk
