= Anthony Award for Best Novel =

Annual literary award

The Anthony Award for Best Novel, established in 1986, is an annual award presented as part of the Anthony Awards on behalf of Mystery Writers of America.

== Recipients ==
Award winners and finalists
Year	Author	Title	Result	Ref.
1986	Sue Grafton	B Is for Burglar	Winner	
1986	Sarah Caudwell	The Shortest Way to Hades	Finalist	
1986	John D. MacDonald	The Lonely Silver Rain	Finalist	
1986	Charlotte MacLeod	The Plain Old Man	Finalist	
1986	Sara Paretsky	Killing Orders	Finalist	
1987	Sue Grafton	C Is for Corpse	Winner	
1987	Lawrence Block	When the Sacred Ginmill Closes	Finalist	
1987	John Lutz	Tropical Heat	Finalist	
1987	Nancy Pickard	No Body	Finalist	
1987	Jonathan Valin	Life’s Work	Finalist	
1988	Tony Hillerman	Skinwalkers	Winner	
1988	Linda Barnes	A Trouble of Fools	Finalist	
1988	Aaron Elkins	Old Bones	Finalist	
1988	Elizabeth Peters	Trojan Gold	Finalist	
1988	Nancy Pickard	Marriage is Murder	Finalist	
1989	Thomas Harris	The Silence of the Lambs	Winner	
1989	Dorothy Cannell	The Widow’s Club	Finalist	
1989	Sue Grafton	E Is for Evidence	Finalist	
1989	Tony Hillerman	Thief of Time	Finalist	
1989	Sara Paretsky	Blood Shot	Finalist	
1989	Nancy Pickard	Dead Crazy	Finalist	
1989	Bill Pronzini	Shackles	Finalist	
1989	Les Roberts	Pepper Pike	Finalist	
1990	Sarah Caudwell	The Sirens Sang of Murder	Winner	
1990	Susan Dunlap	Pious Deception	Finalist	
1990	Carolyn G. Hart	A Little Class on Murder	Finalist	
1990	Margaret Maron	Corpus Christmas	Finalist	
1991	Sue Grafton	G Is for Gumshoe	Winner	
1991	Lawrence Block	A Ticket to the Boneyard	Finalist	
1991	Lia Matera	The Good Fight	Finalist	
1991	Sharyn McCrumb	If Ever I Return, Pretty Peggy-O	Finalist	
1991	Julie Smith	New Orleans Mourning	Finalist	
1992	Peter Lovesey	The Last Detective	Winner	
1992	Susan Dunlap	Rogue Wave	Finalist	
1992	Linda Grant	Love Nor Money	Finalist	
1992	J. A. Jance	Hour of the Hunter	Finalist	
1992	Nancy Pickard	I.O.U.	Finalist	
1992	Marilyn Wallace	A Single Stone	Finalist	
1993	Margaret Maron	Bootlegger’s Daughter	Winner	
1993	Robert Crais	Lullaby Town	Finalist	
1993	John Dunning	Booked To Die	Finalist	
1993	Carolyn G. Hart	Southern Ghost	Finalist	
1993	Sharyn McCrumb	The Hangman’s Beautiful Daughter	Finalist	
1994	Marcia Muller	Wolf in the Shadows	Winner	
1994	Michael Connelly	The Black Ice	Finalist	
1994	Earl Emerson	Morons and Madmen	Finalist	
1994	Joan Hess	O Little Town of Maggody	Finalist	
1994	Tony Hillerman	Sacred Clowns	Finalist	
1994	Janet LaPierre	Old Enemies	Finalist	
1994	Margaret Maron	Southern Discomfort	Finalist	
1994	Kathy Hogan Trocheck	To Live and Die in Dixie	Finalist	
1994	Minette Walters	The Sculptress	Finalist	
1994	Charlene Weir	Consider the Crows	Finalist	
1995	Sharyn McCrumb	She Walks These Hills	Winner	
1995	Michael Connelly	The Concrete Blonde	Finalist	
1995	Lionel Davidson	Kolymsky Heights	Finalist	
1995	Janet Evanovich	One for the Money	Finalist	
1995	Sue Grafton	K Is for Killer	Finalist	
1995	Bayta Gur	Murder on the Kibbutz	Finalist	
1995	Reginald Hill	Pictures of Perfection	Finalist	
1995	Lynda La Plante	Cold Shoulder	Finalist	
1995	John Lescroart	The 13th Juror	Finalist	
1995	Val McDermid	Crack Down	Finalist	
1995	Walter Mosley	Black Betty	Finalist	
1995	Derek Raymond	Not Till the Red Fog Rises	Finalist	
1995	Janwillem van de Wetering	Just a Corpse at Twilight	Finalist	
1996	Mary Willis Walker	Under the Beetle's Cellar	Winner	
1996	Michael Connelly	The Last Coyote	Finalist	
1996	Barbara D'Amato	Hard Christmas	Finalist	
1996	Andrew Klavan	True Crime	Finalist	
1996	Bill Pronzini	Blue Lonesome	Finalist	
1997	Michael Connelly	The Poet	Winner	
1997	Nevada Barr	Firestorm	Finalist	
1997	Linda Grant	Lethal Genes	Finalist	
1997	Margaret Lawrence	Hearts and Bones	Finalist	
1997	Alan Russell	Multiple Wounds	Finalist	
1998	S. J. Rozan	No Colder Place	Winner	
1998	Anthony Bruno	Devil’s Food	Finalist	
1998	Earl Emerson	Deception Pass	Finalist	
1998	Arturo Perez-Reverte	The Club Dumas	Finalist	
1998	James Sallis	Eye of the Cricket	Finalist	
1999	Michael Connelly	Blood Work	Winner	
1999	Nevada Barr	Blind Descent	Finalist	
1999	Reginald Hill	On Beulah Height	Finalist	
1999	Dennis Lehane	Gone, Baby, Gone	Finalist	
1999	Aileen Schumacher	Framework for Death	Finalist	
2000	Peter Robinson	In a Dry Season	Winner	
2000	Rennie Airth	River of Darkness	Finalist	
2000	Jan Burke	Bones	Finalist	
2000	Robert Crais	L.A. Requiem	Finalist	
2000	Janet Evanovich	High Five	Finalist	
2001	Val McDermid	A Place of Execution	Winner	
2001	Nevada Barr	Deep South	Finalist	
2001	Joe R. Lansdale	The Bottoms	Finalist	
2001	Marcia Muller	Listen to the Silence	Finalist	
2001	Elizabeth Peters	He Shall Thunder in the Sky	Finalist	
2001	Charles Todd	Legacy of the Dead	Finalist	
2002	Dennis Lehane	Mystic River	Winner	
2002	Jan Burke	Flight	Finalist	
2002	Harlan Coben	Tell No One	Finalist	
2002	Rick Riordan	The Devil Went Down to Austin	Finalist	
2002	S. J. Rozan	Reflecting the Sky	Finalist	
2003	Michael Connelly	City of Bones	Winner	
2003	Cara Black	Murder in the Sentier	Finalist	
2003	Steve Hamilton	North of Nowhere	Finalist	
2003	George Pelecanos	Hell to Pay	Finalist	
2003	S. J. Rozan	Winter and Night	Finalist	
2004	Laura Lippman	Every Secret Thing	Winner	
2004	Giles Blunt	The Delicate Storm	Finalist	
2004	Steve Hamilton	Blood Is the Sky	Finalist	
2004	Dennis Lehane	Shutter Island	Finalist	
2004	Peter Robinson	Close to Home	Finalist	
2005	William Kent Krueger	Blood Hollow	Winner	
2005	Ken Bruen	The Killing of the Tinkers	Finalist	
2005	John Katzenbach	The Madman's Tale	Finalist	
2005	Laura Lippman	By a Spider’s Thread	Finalist	
2005	T. Jefferson Parker	California Girl	Finalist	
2005	Julia Spencer-Fleming	Out of the Deep I Cry	Finalist	
2006	William Kent Krueger	Mercy Falls	Winner	
2006	Jan Burke	Bloodlines	Finalist	
2006	Michael Connelly	The Lincoln Lawyer	Finalist	
2006	Thomas H. Cook	Red Leaves	Finalist	
2006	Laura Lippman	To the Power of Three	Finalist	
2007	Laura Lippman	No Good Deeds	Winner	
2007	Jan Burke	Kidnapped	Finalist	
2007	Denise Mina	The Dead Hour	Finalist	
2007	Nancy Pickard	The Virgin of Small Plains	Finalist	
2007	Julia Spencer-Fleming	All Mortal Flesh	Finalist	
2008	Laura Lippman	What the Dead Know	Winner	
2008	James Lee Burke	The Tin Roof Blowdown	Finalist	
2008	Lee Child	Bad Luck and Trouble	Finalist	
2008	Robert Crais	The Watchman	Finalist	
2008	William Kent Krueger	Thunder Bay	Finalist	
2009	Michael Connelly	The Brass Verdict	Winner	
2009	Sean Chercover	Trigger City	Finalist	
2009	William Kent Krueger	Red Knife	Finalist	
2009	Stieg Larsson	The Girl with the Dragon Tattoo	Finalist	
2009	Louise Penny	The Cruelest Month	Finalist	
2010	Louise Penny	The Brutal Telling	Winner	
2010	John Hart	The Last Child	Finalist	
2010	Charlie Huston	The Mystic Arts of Erasing All Signs of Death	Finalist	
2010	Stieg Larsson	The Girl Who Played with Fire	Finalist	
2010	S. J. Rozan	The Shanghai Moon	Finalist	
2011	Louise Penny	Bury Your Dead	Winner	
2011	Tom Franklin	Crooked Letter, Crooked Letter	Finalist	
2011	Tana French	Faithful Place	Finalist	
2011	Steve Hamilton	The Lock Artist	Finalist	
2011	Laura Lippman	I’d Know You Anywhere	Finalist	
2012	Louise Penny	A Trick of the Light	Winner	
2012	Megan Abbott	The End of Everything	Finalist	
2012	Reed Farrel Coleman	Hurt Machine	Finalist	
2012	Michael Connelly	The Drop	Finalist	
2012	Julia Spencer-Fleming	One Was a Soldier	Finalist	
2013	Louise Penny	The Beautiful Mystery	Winner	
2013	Megan Abbott	Dare Me	Finalist	
2013	Sean Chercover	Trinity Game	Finalist	
2013	Gillian Flynn	Gone Girl	Finalist	
2013	Hank Phillippi Ryan	The Other Woman	Finalist	
2014	William Kent Krueger	Ordinary Grace	Winner	
2014	Robert Crais	Suspect	Finalist	
2014	Sara J. Henry	A Cold and Lonely Place	Finalist	
2014	Hank Phillippi Ryan	The Wrong Girl	Finalist	
2014	Julia Spencer-Fleming	Through the Evil Days	Finalist	
2015	Laura Lippman	After I’m Gone	Winner	
2015	Joe Clifford	Lamentation	Finalist	
2015	Tana French	The Secret Place	Finalist	
2015	Louise Penny	The Long Way Home	Finalist	
2015	Hank Phillippi Ryan	Truth Be Told	Finalist	
2016	Chris Holm	The Killing Kind	Winner	
2016	Matt Coyle	Night Tremors	Finalist	
2016	Catriona McPherson	The Child Garden	Finalist	
2016	Louise Penny	The Nature of the Beast	Finalist	
2016	Hank Phillippi Ryan	What You See	Finalist	
2017	Louise Penny	A Great Reckoning	Winner	
2017	Megan Abbott	You Will Know Me	Finalist	
2017	Reed Farrel Coleman	Where It Hurts	Finalist	
2017	Chris Holm	Red Right Hand	Finalist	
2017	Laura Lippman	Wilde Lake	Finalist	
2018	Attica Locke	Bluebird, Bluebird	Winner	
2018	Michael Connelly	The Late Show	Finalist	
2018	Anthony Horowitz	Magpie Murders	Finalist	
2018	Louise Penny	Glass Houses	Finalist	
2018	Don Winslow	The Force	Finalist	
2019	Lou Berney	November Road	Winner	
2019	Megan Abbott	Give Me Your Hand	Finalist	
2019	Jennifer Hillier	Jar of Hearts	Finalist	
2019	Laura Lippman	Sunburn	Finalist	
2019	Alex Segura	Blackout	Finalist	
2020	Hank Phillippi Ryan	The Murder List	Winner	
2020	Steph Cha	Your House Will Pay	Finalist	
2020	Rachel Howzell Hall	They All Fall Down	Finalist	
2020	Laura Lippman	Lady in the Lake	Finalist	
2020	Alex Segura	Miami Midnight	Finalist	
2021 (Note: In 2021 and 2023, the award was presented to the "best hardcover novel".)	S. A. Cosby	Blacktop Wasteland	Winner	
2021	Tracy Clark	What You Don’t See	Finalist	
2021	Jennifer Hillier	Little Secrets	Finalist	
2021	Rachel Howzell Hall	And Now She’s Gone	Finalist	
2021	Hank Phillippi Ryan	The First To Lie	Finalist	
2022	S. A. Cosby	Razorblade Tears	Winner	
2022	Tracy Clark	Runner	Finalist	
2022	Alison Gaylin	The Collective	Finalist	
2022	Rachel Howzell Hall	These Toxic Things	Finalist	
2022	Naomi Hirahara	Clark and Division	Finalist	
2023 (Note: In 2021 and 2023, the award was presented to the "best hardcover novel".)	Kellye Garrett	Like a Sister	Winner	
2023	Gabino Iglesias	The Devil Takes You Home	Finalist	
2023	Richard Osman	The Bullet That Missed	Finalist	
2023	Louise Penny	A World of Curiosities	Finalist	
2023	Nita Prose	The Maid	Finalist	
2023	Alex Segura	Secret Identity	Finalist	
