= Bouchercon =

World Mystery Convention

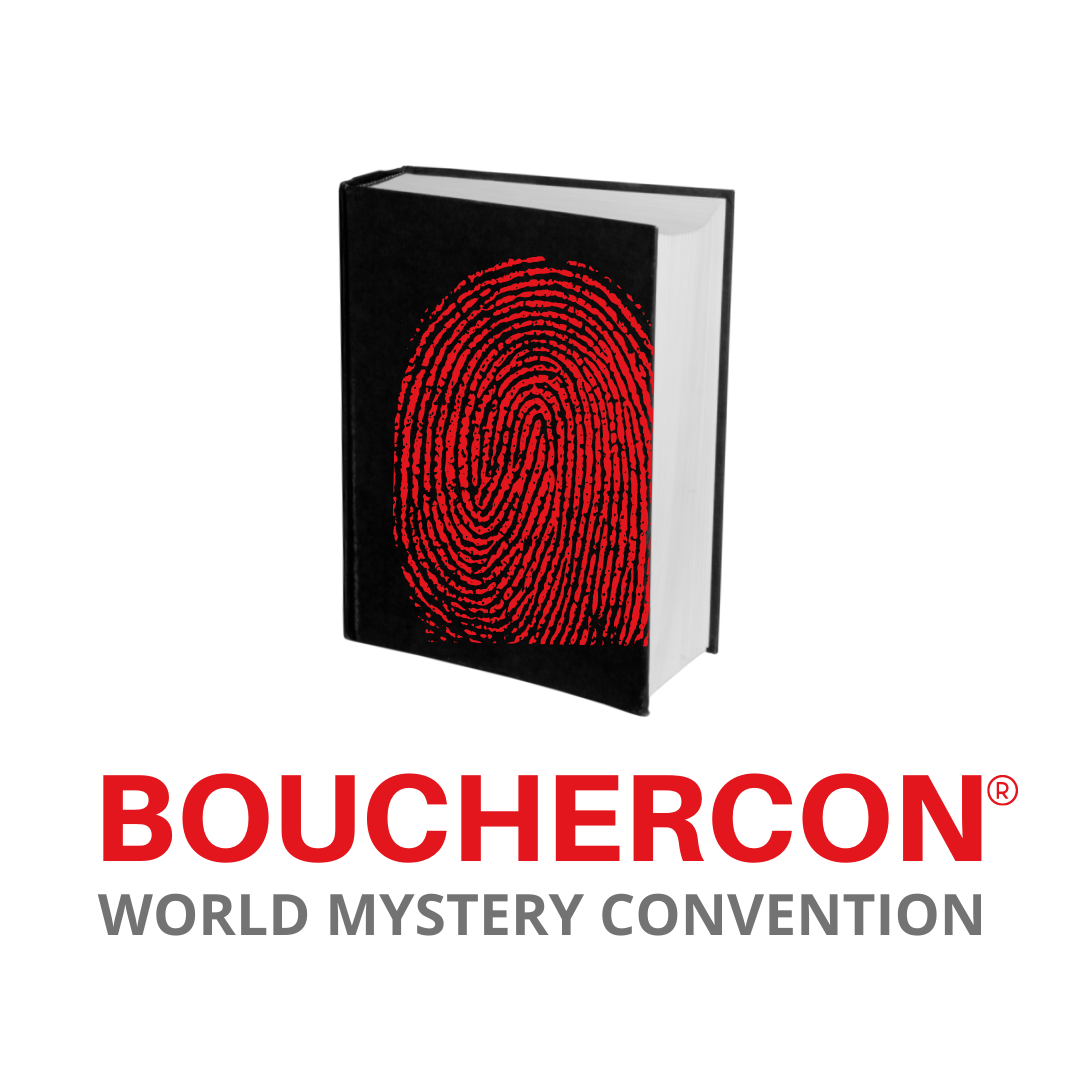
- Genre: Mystery
- Locations: Various. Most recently held in Nashville, TN August 28-September 1, 2024. Upcoming Conventions in New Orleans, LA (2025), Calgary, Canada (2026) Washington, DC (2027), Indianapolis, IN (2028)
- Country: United States
- Inaugurated: 1970
- Attendance: 1,500
- Website: www.bouchercon.com

Bouchercon, the World Mystery Convention, is an annual fan convention of creators and devotees of mystery and crime fiction. It is named in honor of writer, reviewer, and editor Anthony Boucher, and pronounced the way he pronounced his name, rhyming with "voucher".

The multi-day convention is held annually (August–October), and hosted in a different city by a different group of volunteers called the Local Organizing Committee.

Each year, attending Bouchercon members nominate and vote for the Anthony Awards for excellence in crime fiction, including: Best Novel, Best First Novel, Best Short Story, Best Critical Non-Fiction, and Best Paperback Original.

People who attend are fans, authors, agents, booksellers, publishers and other people who read and enjoy mystery and crime fiction. The first Bouchercon was held in Santa Monica, California in 1970. The guest of honor was Robert Bloch of Psycho fame.

Registered attendees of each Bouchercon are designated as 'members', and vote at the annual business meeting (held during the convention) on necessary business items. Bouchercon's governing body is a volunteer National Board, which changes year to year, consisting of elected Board members, and Local Organizing Committee (LOC) members who have hosted, or will host the convention.

== Awards ==
The Anthony Awards are literary awards for mystery writers presented at the Bouchercon World Mystery Convention since 1986. The awards are named for Anthony Boucher (1911–1968), one of the founders of the Mystery Writers of America.

== List of Bouchercons ==
Number	Year	Location/Name	Lifetime Achievement Award	Guest(s) of Honor
I	1970	Santa Monica, California	no award issued	
II	1971	Los Angeles, California	no award issued	
III	1972	Los Angeles, California	no award issued	
IV	1973	Boston, Massachusetts	no award issued	
V	1974	Oakland, California	no award issued	
VI	1975	Chicago, Illinois	no award issued	
VII	1976	Culver City, California	no award issued	
VIII	1977	New York, New York	no award issued	
IX	1978	Chicago, Illinois	no award issued	
X	1979	Los Angeles, California	no award issued	
XI	1980	Washington, D.C.	no award issued	
XII	1981	Milwaukee, Wisconsin	no award issued	
XIII	1982	San Francisco, California	no award issued	
XIV	1983	New York, New York	no award issued	
XV	1984	Chicago, Illinois	no award issued	
XVI	1985	San Francisco, California	no award issued	
XVII	1986	Baltimore, Maryland	no award issued	
XVIII	1987	Minneapolis, Minnesota	no award issued	
XIX	1988	San Diego, California	no award issued	
XX	1989	Philadelphia, Pennsylvania	Dorothy Salisbury Davis	
XXI	1990	London, England	Michael Gilbert	
XXII	1991	Pasadena, California	William Campbell Gault	
XXIII	1992	Toronto, Ontario, Canada	Charlotte MacLeod	
XXIV	1993	Omaha, Nebraska	Hammond Innes and Ralph McInerny	
XXV	1994	Seattle, Washington	Tony Hillerman	
XXVI	1995	Nottingham, England	no award issued	
XXVII	1996	St. Paul, Minnesota	no award issued	
XXVIII	1997	Monterey, California	Donald E. Westlake	
XXIX	1998	Philadelphia, Pennsylvania	no award issued	
XXX	1999	Milwaukee, Wisconsin	Len Moffatt and June Moffatt	
XXXI	2000	Denver, Colorado	Jane Langton	
XXXII	2001	Washington, D.C.	Edward D. Hoch	
XXXIII	2002	Austin, Texas	no award issued	
XXXIV	2003	Las Vegas, Nevada	no award issued	
XXXV	2004	Toronto, Ontario, Canada	Bernard Cornwell	
XXXVI	2005	Chicago, Illinois	Bill Pronzini and Marcia Muller	
XXXVII	2006	Madison, Wisconsin	Robert B. Parker	
XXXVIII	2007	Anchorage, Alaska	James Sallis	
XXXIX	2008	Baltimore, Maryland	Lawrence Block	
XL	2009	Indianapolis, Indiana	Allen J. Hubin	
XLI	2010	San Francisco, California Bouchercon By the Bay	Lee Child	
XLII	2011	St. Louis, Missouri The Girl Who Came to Bouchercon	Sara Paretsky	
XLIII	2012	Cleveland, Ohio You Want to Tell No One	Mary Higgins Clark	
XLIV	2013	Albany, New York A New York State of Crime	Sue Grafton	
XLV	2014	Long Beach, California Murder at the Beach	Jeffery Deaver	
XLVI	2015	Raleigh, North Carolina Murder Under the Oaks	Margaret Maron	
XLVII	2016	New Orleans, Louisiana Blood on the Bayou	David Morrell	
XLVIII	2017	Toronto, Ontario, Canada Passport to Murder	no award issued	
XLIX	2018	St. Petersburg, Florida Sunny Place, Shady People	Ian Rankin	Sean Chercover (American) Karin Slaughter (American) Mark Billingham (International) Sara Blaedel (International) Tim Dorsey (Florida) Judy Bobalik (Fan) Ayo Onatade (Fan) John D. MacDonald (Ghost of Honor) Lisa Unger (Toastmaster)
L	2019	Dallas, Texas Denim, Diamonds, & Death	Peter Lovesey	Hank Phillippi Ryan; James Patterson; Deborah Crombie; Felix Francis; Harry Hunsicker; McKenna Jordan
LI	2020	Sacramento, California Where Murder is a Capital Crime	Walter Mosley	Scott Turow; Anne Perry; Cara Black (author); Janet A Rudolph; Catriona McPherson
LII	2021	New Orleans	Cancelled due to Covid	
LIII	2022	Minneapolis, Minnesota Land of 10,000 Thrills	Ellen Hart	Lou Berney (American); SA Cosby (Rising Star); Attica Locke (American) William Kent Krueger (Local); Jo Nesbo (International); Alexander McCall Smith (International Lifetime Achievement); Jess Lourey (Toastmaster); Lori Rader-Day (Toastmaster)
LIV	2023	San Diego, California Murder at the Marina	David Baldacci	Ann Cleeves (International); Jacqueline Winspear (Regional); Dru Ann Love (Fan); Kate Carlisle (Cozy); C.J. Box (National) Carolyn Keene & Franklin W. Dixon (Ghosts of Honor); Naomi Hirahara (Toastmaster)
LV	2024	Nashville, Tennessee Murder & Mayhem in Music City	Anthony Horowitz	V.M. Burns (Cozy); Harlan Coben (Distinguished); J.T. Ellison (Local); Heather Graham (American); Mick Herron (International); Clay Stafford (Fan); Kelli Stanley (Historical); Brad Thor (Thriller) Rachel Howzell Hall (Toastmaster)
LVI	2025	New Orleans Blood on the Bayou -Case Closed	Craig Johnson	Lisa Jewell (British); Michael Connelly (Lifetime Contribution to Genre); Brad Thor (Special) Charles Todd (Special); Jonathan Maberry (YA); Steph Cha (Thriller); Ali Karim (International Fan); Alex Segura (Toastmaster)
LVII	2026	Calgary, Alberta, Canada	Louise Penny	Kathy Reichs (Cross-Border); Abir Mukherjee (International); Mark Greaney (novelist) (American); Jennifer Hillier (Canadian); Vicki Delany (Cozy); Kevin Sands (Kids); PJ Vernon (Toastmaster); Steele Curry (Fan Posthumously)
LVIII	2027	Washington, DC Murder Most Monumental	Laura Lippman	S.A. Cosby (National); Martin Edwards (International); Laura Joh Rowland (National); George Pelecanos (Local); Barbara Neely (In Memoriam); Art Taylor (Toastmaster)
	2028	Indianapolis, IN Secrets & Suspense in Speed City		
	2029	Miami, FL Vice City Verdicts		
