= Bouchercon XXXVII =

2006 mystery and detective fiction convention

- "A Prairie Plot"
- Date: September 28, 2006
- Location: Madison, Wisconsin
- Country: USA
- Hosted by: Al Abramson

Bouchercon is an annual convention of creators and devotees of mystery and detective fiction. It is named in honour of writer, reviewer, and editor Anthony Boucher; also the inspiration for the Anthony Awards, which have been issued at the convention since 1986. This page details Bouchercon XXXVII and the 21st Anthony Awards ceremony.

== Bouchercon ==
The convention was held in Madison, Wisconsin on September 28, 2006; running until October 1. The event was chaired by Al Abramson.

=== Special Guests ===
- Lifetime Achievement award — Robert B. Parker
- Guest of Honor — M. C. Beaton
- American Guest of Honor — Nevada Barr
- Fan Guest of Honor — Jim Huang
- Toastmaster — William Kent Krueger
- Special Guest — Joseph Wambaugh

== Anthony Awards ==
The following list details the awards distributed at the twenty-first annual Anthony Awards ceremony.

=== Novel award ===
Winner:

- William Kent Krueger, Mercy Falls

Shortlist:

- Jan Burke, Bloodlines
- Michael Connelly, The Lincoln Lawyer
- Thomas H. Cook, Red Leaves
- Laura Lippman, To the Power of Three

=== First novel award ===
Winner:

- Chris Grabenstein, Tilt-a-Whirl

Shortlist:

- Megan Abbott, Die a Little
- Brian Freeman, Immoral
- Randall Hicks, The Baby Game
- Theresa Schwegel, Office Down

=== Paperback original award ===
Winner:

- Reed Farrel Coleman, The James Deans

Shortlist:

- Allan Guthrie, Kiss Her Goodbye
- Charlie Huston, Six Bad Things
- Susan McBride, Good Girl's Guide to Murder
- P. J. Parrish, A Killing Rain

=== Short story award ===
Winner:

- Barbara Seranella, "Misdirection", from Greatest Hits: Original Stories of Assassins, Hit Men and Hired Guns

Shortlist:

- Libby Fischer Hellmann, "House Rules", from Murder in Vegas: New Crime Tales of Gambling and Desperation
- Nancy Pickard, "There is No Crime on Easter Island", from Ellery Queen's Mystery Magazine September / October 2005
- Marcia Talley, "Driven to Distraction", from Chesapeake Crimes II: 15 Tales of Mystery, Mayhem, and Murder
- Elaine Viets, "Killer Blonde: A Dead-End Job Mystery", from Drop-Dead Blonde

=== Critical / Non-fiction award ===
Winner:

- Marvin Lachman, The Heirs of Anthony Boucher

Shortlist:

- Hallie Ephron, Writing and Selling your Mystery Novel
- Stuart Kaminsky, Behind the Mystery
- Leslie Klinger, New Annotated Sherlock Holmes
- Melanie Rehak, Girl Sleuth: Nancy Drew and the Women who Created Her

=== Fan publication award ===
Winner:

- Jon Jordan & Ruth Jordan, Crimespree Magazine

Shortlist:

- George Easter, Deadly Pleasures
- Lynn Kaczmarek & Chris Aldrich, Mystery News
- Janet Rudolph, Mystery Readers Journal
- Brian Skupin & Kate Stine, Mystery Scene Magazine

=== Special service award ===
Winner:

- Janet Rudolph, Mystery Readers International

Shortlist:

- George Easter, Deadly Pleasures
- Maddy Van Hertbruggen, 4 Mystery Addicts
- Sarah Weinman, Confessions of an Idiosyncratic Mind
