= Bouchercon XXVIII =

1997 mystery and detective fiction convention

- Date: October 30, 1997
- Location: Monterey, California
- Country: USA
- Hosted by: Bruce Taylor, Bryan Barrett

Bouchercon is an annual convention of creators and devotees of mystery and detective fiction. It is named in honour of writer, reviewer, and editor Anthony Boucher; also the inspiration for the Anthony Awards, which have been issued at the convention since 1986. This page details Bouchercon XXVIII and the 12th Anthony Awards ceremony.

== Bouchercon ==
The convention was originally intended to be held in San Francisco, however this was changed to Monterey, California on October 30, 1997; running until the November 2. The event was chaired by Bruce Taylor, owner of "The San Francisco Mystery Bookstore"; and Bryan Barrett. The convention was financially successful, earning a net profit of US$50,000.

=== Special Guests ===
- Lifetime achievement — Donald E. Westlake
- Guest of Honor — Sara Paretsky
- Special Guest of Honor (posthumously) — Ross Thomas
- Fan Guest of Honor — Cap'n Bob Napier
- Toastmaster — Julie Smith

== Anthony Awards ==
The following list details the awards distributed at the twelfth annual Anthony Awards ceremony.

=== Novel award ===
Winner:

- Michael Connelly, The Poet

Shortlist:

- Nevada Barr, Firestorm
- Linda Grant, Lethal Genes
- Margaret Lawrence, Hearts and Bones
- Alan Russell, Multiple Wounds

=== First novel award ===
Winners:

- Dale Furutani, Death in Little Tokyo
- Terris McMahan Grimes, Somebody Else's Child

Shortlist:

- Michael McGarrity, Tularosa
- Charles Todd, A Test of Wills
- Michael C. White, A Brother's Blood

=== Paperback original award ===
Winner:

- Terris McMahan Grimes, Somebody Else's Child

Shortlist:

- Harlan Coben, Fade Away
- Teri Holbrook, The Grass Widow
- Susan Wade, Walking Rain
- Steven Womack, Chain of Fools

=== Short story award ===
Winner:

- Carolyn Wheat, "Accidents Will Happen", from Malice Domestic 5

Shortlist:

- Brendan DuBois, "The Dark Snow", from Playboy November 1996
- Janet LaPierre, "Luminarias Make It Christmas-y", from Ellery Queen's Mystery Magazine February 1996
- Eve K. Sandstrom, "Bugged", from Malice Domestic 5

=== Critical / Non-fiction award ===
Winner:

- Willetta L. Heising, Detecting Women 2: Reader's Guide and Checklist for Mystery Series Written by Women

Shortlist:

- Ron Miller, Karen Sharpe, Mystery!: A Celebration: Stalking Public Television's Greatest Sleuths
- Barbara Reynolds, The Letters of Dorothy L. Sayers 1899–1936: The Making of a Detective Novelist
- Jean Swanson, Dean James, By A Woman's Hand: A Guide to Mystery Fiction by Women
- Steven Womack, Chain of Fools

=== Fanzine / Magazine award ===
Winner:

- The Armchair Detective

Shortlist:

- Deadly Pleasures
- Mystery & Detective Monthly
- Mystery Readers Journal
- Mystery Scene
