= Bouchercon XXXII =

2001 mystery and detective fiction convention

- "A Capital Mystery"
- Date: November 1, 2001
- Location: Washington, D.C.
- Country: USA
- Hosted by: Adolph P. Falcón, William L. Starck

Bouchercon is an annual convention of creators and devotees of mystery and detective fiction. It is named in honour of writer, reviewer, and editor Anthony Boucher; also the inspiration for the Anthony Awards, which have been issued at the convention since 1986. This page details Bouchercon XXXII and the 16th Anthony Awards ceremony.

== Bouchercon ==
The convention was held in Washington, D.C. on November 1, 2001; running until the 4th. The event was chaired by vice president of "science and policy" at the National Alliance for Hispanic Health Adolph P. Falcón; and William L. Starck, of NACO, the Library of Congress authority control co-operative.

=== Special Guests ===
- Lifetime Achievement award — Edward D. Hoch
- American Guest of Honor — Sue Grafton
- International Guest of Honor — Peter Lovesey
- Fan Guests of Honor — Lew Buckingham & Nancy Buckingham
- Toastmaster — Michael Connelly

== Anthony Awards ==
The following list details the awards distributed at the sixteenth annual Anthony Awards ceremony.

=== Novel award ===
Winner:

- Val McDermid, A Place of Execution

Shortlist:

- Nevada Barr, Deep South
- Joe R. Lansdale, The Bottoms
- Marcia Muller, Listen to the Silence
- Elizabeth Peters, He Shall Thunder in the Sky
- Charles Todd, Legacy of the Dead

=== First novel award ===
Winner:

- Qiu Xiaolong, Death of a Red Heroine

Shortlist:

- Stephen Booth, Black Dog
- David Liss, A Conspiracy of Paper
- Scott Phillips, The Ice Harvest
- Bob Truluck, Street Level
- Douglas E. Winter, Run

=== Paperback original award ===
Winner:

- Kate Grilley, Death Dances to a Reggae Beat

Shortlist:

- Katy Munger, Bad to the Bone
- Daniel Stashower, The Floating Lady Murder
- Chassie L. West, Killing Kin
- Laura Wilson, A Little Death
- Eric Wright, The Kidnapping of Rosie Dawn

=== Short story award ===
Winner:

- Edward D. Hoch, "The Problem of the Potting Shed", from Ellery Queen's Mystery Magazine July 2000

Shortlist:

- Rhys Bowen, "The Seal of the Confessional", from Unholy Orders: Mystery Stories with a Religious Twist
- Rochelle Krich, "Widow's Peak", from Unholy Orders: Mystery Stories with a Religious Twist
- Donald Olson, "Don't Go Upstairs", from Ellery Queen's Mystery Magazine August 2000
- Peter Robinson, "Missing in Action", from Ellery Queen's Mystery Magazine November 2000

=== Critical / Non-fiction award ===
Winner:

- Jim Huang, 100 Favorite Mysteries of the Century

Shortlist:

- Matthew Bunson, The Complete Christie: An Agatha Christie Encyclopedia
- Martha Hailey DuBose, Women of Mystery: The Lives and Works of Notable Women Crime Novelists
- Marvin Lachman, The American Regional Mystery
- Erin A. Smith, Hard-Boiled: Working Class Readers and Pulp Magazines

=== Short story collection / anthology award ===
Winner:

- Lawrence Block, Master's Choice II

Shortlist:

- Joan Hess, Malice Domestic 9
- Jeffrey Marks, Magnolias and Mayhem
- Serita Stevens, Unholy Orders
- Carolyn Wheat, Tales out of School

=== Fan publication award ===
Winner:

- Chris Aldrich & Lynn Kaczmarek, Mystery News

Shortlist:

- George Easter, Deadly Pleasures
- Jim Huang, The Drood Review of Mystery
- Sue Feder, Murder: Past Tense
- Janet Rudolph, Mystery Readers Journal
