= Anthony Awards =

Literary award for mystery writers

- Awarded for: Best in mystery fiction
- Presented by: Bouchercon World Mystery Convention
- First award: 1986
- Website: bouchercon.com

The Anthony Awards are literary awards for mystery writers presented at the Bouchercon World Mystery Convention since 1986. The awards are named for Anthony Boucher (1911–1968), one of the founders of the Mystery Writers of America.

== Categories ==
Awards are voted for by members attending the annual event and are given in a number of categories, including

- Anthony Award for Best Novel
- Anthony Award for Best First Novel
- Anthony Award for Best Paperback Original
- Anthony Award for Best Short Story
- Critical / Non-fiction Work
- Special Service award

The ceremony may also include a number of "wild card" awards.

== Winners ==
=== 1980s ===
Anthony Award winners (1986-1989)
| Year | Category | Author | Title |
|---|---|---|---|
| 1986 | First Novel | Jonathan Kellerman | When the Bough Breaks |
| 1986 | Movie | | Witness |
| 1986 | Novel | Sue Grafton | "B" Is for Burglar |
| 1986 | Paperback Original | Nancy Pickard | Say No to Murder |
| 1986 | Short Story | Linda Barnes | "Lucky Penny" from The New Black Mask, No. 3 |
| 1986 | TV Series | | Murder She Wrote |
| 1986 | Grand Master | Barbara Mertz | |
| 1987 | First Novel | Bill Crider | Too Late to Die |
| 1987 | Novel | Sue Grafton | "C" Is for Corpse |
| 1987 | Paperback Original | Robert Wright Campbell | The Junkyard Dog |
| 1987 | Short Story | Sue Grafton | "The Parker Shotgun" from Mean Streets |
| 1988 | First Novel | Gillian Roberts | Caught Dead in Philadelphia |
| 1988 | Movie | | The Big Easy |
| 1988 | Novel | Tony Hillerman | Skinwalkers |
| 1988 | Paperback Original | Robert Crais | The Monkey's Raincoat |
| 1988 | Short Story | Robert Barnard | "Breakfast Television" from Ellery Queen's Mystery Magazine, January 1987 |
| 1988 | TV Series | | Mystery! |
| 1989 | First Novel | Elizabeth George | A Great Deliverance |
| 1989 | Novel | Thomas Harris | The Silence of the Lambs |
| 1989 | Paperback Original | Carolyn Hart | Something Wicked |
| 1989 | Short Story | No award presented | |
| 1989 | Lifetime Achievement | Dorothy Salisbury Davis | |
| 1989 | Distinguished Contribution | Joan Kahn | |

=== 1990s ===
Anthony Award winners (1990-1999)
| Year | Category | Author | Title | Ref. |
|---|---|---|---|---|
| 1990 | First Novel | Karen Kijewski | Katwalk | |
| 1990 | Movie | | Crimes and Misdemeanors | |
| 1990 | Novel | Sarah Caudwell | The Sirens Sang of Murder | |
| 1990 | Paperback Original | Carolyn Hart | Honeymoon with Murder | |
| 1990 | Short Story | Nancy Pickard | Afraid All The Time from Sisters in Crime | |
| 1990 | TV Series | | Inspector Morse | |
| 1990 | Lifetime Achievement | Michael Gilbert | | |
| 1991 | Critical work | Jon L. Breen and Martin H. Greenberg | Synod Of Sleuths | |
| 1991 | First Novel | Patricia Cornwell | Postmortem | |
| 1991 | Motion Picture | | Presumed Innocent | |
| 1991 | Novel | Sue Grafton | "G" Is for Gumshoe | |
| 1991 | Paperback Original | Rochelle Krich | Where's Mommy Now? | |
| 1991 | Paperback Original | James McCahery | Grave Undertaking | |
| 1991 | Short Story | Susan Dunlap | "The Celestial Buffet" from Sisters in Crime 2 | |
| 1991 | Television series | | Mystery! | |
| 1991 | Lifetime Achievement | William Campbell Gault | | |
| 1992 | Anthology / Short Story collection | Sara Paretsky | A Woman's Eye | |
| 1992 | Critical work | Maxim Jakubowski | 100 Great Detectives | |
| 1992 | First Novel | Sue Henry | Murder on the Iditarod Trail | |
| 1992 | Novel | Peter Lovesey | The Last Detective | |
| 1992 | Paperback Original | No award presented | | |
| 1992 | Short Story | Liza Cody | "Lucky Dip" from A Woman’s Eye | |
| 1992 | True Crime | David Simon | Homicide: A Year on the Killing Streets | |
| 1992 | Lifetime Achievement | Charlotte MacLeod | | |
| 1993 | Critical work | Ellen Nehr | Doubleday Crime Club Compendium 1928-1991 | |
| 1993 | First Novel | Barbara Neely | Blanche on the Lam | |
| 1993 | Motion Picture | | The Crying Game | |
| 1993 | Novel | Margaret Maron | Bootlegger's Daughter | |
| 1993 | Paperback Original | No award presented | | |
| 1993 | Short Story | Diane Mott Davidson | "Cold Turkey" from Sisters in Crime 5 | |
| 1993 | True Crime | Barbara D'Amato | The Doctor, the Murder, the Mystery: The True Story of the Dr. John Branion Murder Case | |
| 1993 | Lifetime Achievement | Hammond Innes | | |
| 1993 | Lifetime Achievement | Ralph McInerny | | |
| 1994 | Anthology / Short Story collection | Martin H. Greenberg | Mary Higgins Clark presents Malice Domestic 2 | |
| 1994 | Critical work | Ed Gorman, Martin H. Greenberg, and Larry Segriff | The Fine Art Of Murder: The Mystery Reader's Indispensable Companion | |
| 1994 | First Novel | Nevada Barr | Track of the Cat | |
| 1994 | Novel | Marcia Muller | Wolf in the Shadows | |
| 1994 | Paperback Original | No award presented | | |
| 1994 | Short Story | Susan Dunlap | "Checkout" from Malice Domestic 2 | |
| 1994 | True Crime | Ann Rule | A Rose for Her Grave and Other True Cases | |
| 1994 | Lifetime Achievement | Tony Hillerman | | |
| 1995 | Anthology / Short Story collection | Tony Hillerman | The Mysterious West | |
| 1995 | Critical work | B.A. Pike and J. Cooper | Crime Fiction, 2nd Edition | |
| 1995 | Film | | Pulp Fiction | |
| 1995 | First Novel | Caleb Carr | The Alienist | |
| 1995 | Novel | Sharyn McCrumb | She Walks These Hills | |
| 1995 | Short Story | Sharyn McCrumb | "The Monster of Glamis" from Royal Crimes | |
| 1995 | True Crime | David Canter | Criminal Shadows: Inside the Mind of the Serial Killer | |
| 1995 | TV Series | | Prime Suspect | |
| 1995 | Lifetime Achievement | Ruth Rendell | | |
| 1996 | Cover Art | Pamela Patrick | The Body In The Transept | |
| 1996 | Critical / Non-Fiction Work | Kate Stine | The Armchair Detective Book of Lists, 2nd Edition | |
| 1996 | Editor | Sara Ann Freed | | |
| 1996 | First Novel | Virginia Lanier | Death in Bloodhound Red | |
| 1996 | Magazine / Digest / Review Publication | | The Armchair Detective | |
| 1996 | Movie | | The Usual Suspects | |
| 1996 | Novel | Mary Willis Walker | Under the Beetle's Cellar | |
| 1996 | Paperback Original | Harlan Coben | Deal Breaker | |
| 1996 | Publisher | St. Martin's Press | | |
| 1996 | Short Story | Gar Anthony Haywood | "And Pray Nobody Sees You" from Spooks, Spies, and Private Eyes | |
| 1996 | Short Story collection | Marcia Muller | The McCone Files: The Complete Sharon McCone Stories | |
| 1996 | True Crime | Ann Rule | Dead By Sunset: Perfect Husband, Perfect Killer? | |
| 1996 | TV Show | | The X-Files | |
| 1997 | Critical / Non-Fiction Work | Willetta L. Heising | Detecting Women 2: Reader's Guide and Checklist for Mystery Series Written by Women | |
| 1997 | Fanzine | | The Armchair Detective | |
| 1997 | First Novel | Dale Furutani | Death in Little Tokyo | |
| 1997 | First Novel | Terris McMahan Grimes | Somebody Else's Child | |
| 1997 | Novel | Michael Connelly | The Poet | |
| 1997 | Short Story | Carolyn Wheat | "Accidents Will Happen" from Malice Domestic 5 | |
| 1997 | Lifetime Achievement | Donald E. Westlake | | |
| 1998 | Cover Art | Michael Kellner | Night Dogs | |
| 1998 | Critical / Non-Fiction Work | No award presented | | |
| 1998 | First Novel | Lee Child | Killing Floor | |
| 1998 | Novel | S. J. Rozan | No Colder Place | |
| 1998 | Paperback Original | Rick Riordan | Big Red Tequila | |
| 1998 | Short Story | Edward D. Hoch | "One Bag of Coconuts" from Ellery Queen's Mystery Magazine, November 1997 | |
| 1998 | Short Story | Jan Grape | "A Front Row Seat" from Vengeance is Hers | |
| 1999 | Critical / Non-Fiction Work | George Easter | Deadly Pleasures Magazine | |
| 1999 | First Novel | William Kent Krueger | Iron Lake | |
| 1999 | Novel | Michael Connelly | Blood Work | |
| 1999 | Paperback Original | Laura Lippman | Butchers Hill | |
| 1999 | Short Story | Barbara D'Amato | "Of Course You Know that Chocolate Is a Vegetable" from Ellery Queen's Mystery Magazine, November 1998 | |
| 1999 | Lifetime Achievement | Len and June Moffatt | | |

=== 2000s ===
Anthony Award winners (2000-2009)
| Year | Category | Author | Title |
|---|---|---|---|
| 2000 | Critical / Non-Fiction Work | Willetta L. Heising | Detecting Women, 3rd edition |
| 2000 | First Novel | Donna Andrews | Murder with Peacocks |
| 2000 | Novel | Peter Robinson | In a Dry Season |
| 2000 | Novel of the century | Daphne Du Maurier | Rebecca |
| 2000 | Paperback Original | Laura Lippman | In Big Trouble |
| 2000 | Series of the Century | Agatha Christie | Hercule Poirot series |
| 2000 | Short Story | Meg Chittenden | "Noir Lite" from Ellery Queen's Mystery Magazine, January 1999 |
| 2000 | Writer of the Century | Agatha Christie | |
| 2000 | Lifetime Achievement | Jane Langton | |
| 2001 | Anthology / Short-story collection | Lawrence Block | Master's Choice II |
| 2001 | Critical / Non-Fiction Work | Jim Huang | 100 Favorite Mysteries Of The Century |
| 2001 | Fan Publication | Chris Aldrich and Lynn Kaczmarek | Mystery News |
| 2001 | First Novel | Qiu Xiaolong | Death of a Red Heroine |
| 2001 | Novel | Val McDermid | A Place of Execution |
| 2001 | Paperback Original | Kate Grilley | Death Dances to a Reggae Beat |
| 2001 | Short Story | Edward D. Hoch | "The Problem of the Potting Shed" from Ellery Queen's Mystery Magazine, July 2000 |
| 2001 | Lifetime Achievement | Edward D. Hoch | |
| 2002 | Cover Art | Michael Storrings | "Reflecting the Sky," from photograph by Josef Beck |
| 2002 | Critical / Non-Fiction Work | Tony Hillerman | Seldom Disappointed |
| 2002 | First Novel | C. J. Box | Open Season |
| 2002 | Novel | Dennis Lehane | Mystic River |
| 2002 | Paperback Original | Charlaine Harris | Dead Until Dark |
| 2002 | Short Story | Bill Crider and Judy Crider | "Chocolate Moose" from Death Dines at 8:30 |
| 2002 | Young Adult Mystery | Penny Warner | The Mystery of the Haunted Caves |
| 2002 | Special Service | Doris Ann Norris | |
| 2003 | Cover Art | Michael Kellner | "Measures of Poison" from photograph by Christopher Voelker |
| 2003 | Critical / Non-Fiction Work | Jim Huang | They Died in Vain: Overlooked, Underappreciated and Forgotten Mystery Novels |
| 2003 | First Novel | Julia Spencer-Fleming | In the Bleak Midwinter |
| 2003 | Novel | Michael Connelly | City of Bones |
| 2003 | Paperback Original | Robin Burcell | Fatal Truth |
| 2003 | Short Story | Marcia Talley | "Too Many Cooks" from Much Ado About Murder |
| 2003 | Special Service | No award issued | |
| 2004 | Critical / Non-Fiction Work | Gary Warren Niebuhr | Make Mine a Mystery: A Reader's Guide to Mystery and Detective Fiction |
| 2004 | First Novel | P. J. Tracy | Monkeewrench |
| 2004 | Historical Mystery | Rhys Bowen | For The Love Of Mike |
| 2004 | Novel | Laura Lippman | Every Secret Thing |
| 2004 | Paperback Original | Robin Burcell | Deadly Legacy |
| 2004 | Short Story | Rhys Bowen | "Doppelganger" from Blood on Their Hands |
| 2004 | Young Adult Mystery | J.K. Rowling | Harry Potter and the Order of the Phoenix |
| 2004 | Special Service | No award issued | |
| 2005 | Cover Art | Sohrab Habibion | Brooklyn Noir |
| 2005 | Critical / Non-Fiction Work | Max Allan Collins et al. | Men's Adventure Magazines |
| 2005 | First Novel | Harley Jane Kozak | Dating Dead Men |
| 2005 | Novel | William Kent Krueger | Blood Hollow |
| 2005 | Paperback Original | Jason Starr | Twisted City |
| 2005 | Short Story | Elaine Viets | "Wedding Knife" from Chesapeake Crimes |
| 2005 | Lifetime Achievement | Bill Pronzini and Marcia Muller | |
| 2005 | Lifetime Achievement | Marcia Muller | |
| 2005 | Special Service | No award issued | |
| 2006 | Critical / Non-Fiction Work | Marv Lachman | The Heirs of Anthony Boucher |
| 2006 | Fan Publication | Jon and Ruth Jordan | Crimespree Magazine |
| 2006 | First Novel | Chris Grabenstein | Tilt-a-Whirl |
| 2006 | Novel | William Kent Krueger | Mercy Falls |
| 2006 | Paperback Original | Reed Farrel Coleman | The James Deans |
| 2006 | Short Story | Barbara Seranella | "Misdirection" from Greatest Hits |
| 2006 | Lifetime Achievement | Robert B. Parker | |
| 2006 | Special Service | Janet Rudolph | Mystery Readers International |
| 2007 | Critical / Non-Fiction Work | Jim Huang and Austin Lugar | Mystery Muses |
| 2007 | First Novel | Louise Penny | Still Life |
| 2007 | Novel | Laura Lippman | No Good Deeds |
| 2007 | Paperback Original | Dana Cameron | Ashes and Bones |
| 2007 | Short Story | Simon Wood | "My Father's Secret" from Crimespree Magazine |
| 2007 | Lifetime Achievement | James Sallis | |
| 2007 | Special Service | Jim Huang | |
| 2007 | Special Service | Crum Creek Press | |
| 2007 | Special Service | The Mystery Company | |
| 2008 | Critical / Non-Fiction Work | Jon Lellenberg, Daniel Stashower, and Charles Foley | Arthur Conan Doyle: A Life in Letters |
| 2008 | First Novel | Tana French | In the Woods |
| 2008 | Novel | Laura Lippman | What the Dead Know |
| 2008 | Paperback Original | P. J. Parrish | A Thousand Bones |
| 2008 | Short Story | Laura Lippman | "Hardly Knew Her" from Dead Man's Hand |
| 2008 | Website / Blog | Lucinda Surber and Stan Ulrich | Stop, You're Killing Me! |
| 2008 | Lifetime Achievement | Robert Rosenwald | |
| 2008 | Lifetime Achievement | Barbara G. Peters | |
| 2008 | Special Service | Jon and Ruth Jordan | Crimespree magazine |
| 2009 | Children's / Young-adult Novel | Chris Grabenstein | The Crossroads |
| 2009 | Cover Art | Peter Mendelsund | The Girl with the Dragon Tattoo |
| 2009 | Critical / Non-Fiction Work | Jeffrey Marks | Anthony Boucher: A Biobibliography |
| 2009 | First Novel | Stieg Larsson | The Girl with the Dragon Tattoo |
| 2009 | Novel | Michael Connelly | The Brass Verdict |
| 2009 | Paperback Original | Julie Hyzy | State of the Onion |
| 2009 | Short Story | Sean Chercover | "A Sleep Not Unlike Death" from Hardcore Hardboiled |
| 2009 | Lifetime Achievement | Allen J. Hubin | |
| 2009 | Special Service | Jon and Ruth Jordan | Crimespree magazine |

=== 2010s ===
Anthony Award winners (2010-2019)
| Year | Category | Author | Title | Ref. |
|---|---|---|---|---|
| 2010 | Critical / Non-Fiction Work | P.D. James | Talking About Detective Fiction | |
| 2010 | First Novel | Sophie Littlefield | A Bad Day for Sorry | |
| 2010 | Novel | Louise Penny | The Brutal Telling | |
| 2010 | Paperback Original | Bryan Gruley | Starvation Lake | |
| 2010 | Short Story | Hank Phillippi Ryan | On the House from Quarry: Crime Stories by New England Writers | |
| 2010 | Special Service award | No award issued | | |
| 2011 | Critical / Non-Fiction Work | John Curran | Agatha Christie's Secret Notebooks | |
| 2011 | First Novel | Hilary Davidson | Damage Done | |
| 2011 | Graphic Novel | Jason Starr | The Chill | |
| 2011 | Novel | Louise Penny | Bury Your Dead | |
| 2011 | Paperback Original | Duane Swierczynski | Expiration Date | |
| 2011 | Short Story | Dana Cameron | "Swing Shift" from Crimes By Moonlight: Mysteries from the Dark Side | |
| 2011 | Website / Blog | Lucinda Surber and Stan Ulrich | Stop, You're Killing Me! | |
| 2011 | Lifetime Achievement | Sara Paretsky | | |
| 2011 | Special Service award | Ali Karim | Shots | |
| 2012 | Critical / Non-Fiction Work | Charlaine Harris | The Sookie Stackhouse Companion | |
| 2012 | First Novel | Sara J. Henry | Learning to Swim | |
| 2012 | Novel | Louise Penny | A Trick of the Light | |
| 2012 | Paperback Original | Julie Hyzy | Buffalo West Wing | |
| 2012 | Short Story | Dana Cameron | "Disarming" from Ellery Queen's Mystery Magazine, June 2011 | |
| 2013 | Critical / Non-Fiction Work | John Connolly and Declan Burke | Books to Die For: The World's Greatest Mystery Writers on the World's Greatest Mystery Novels | |
| 2013 | First Novel | Chris Pavone | The Expats | |
| 2013 | Novel | Louise Penny | The Beautiful Mystery | |
| 2013 | Paperback Original | Johnny Shaw | Big Maria | |
| 2013 | Short Story | Dana Cameron | "Mischief in Mesopotamia" from Ellery Queen's Mystery Magazine, November 2012 | |
| 2014 | Critical / Non-Fiction Work | Daniel Stashower | The Hour of Peril: The Secret Plot To Murder Lincoln Before the Civil War | |
| 2014 | First Novel | Matt Coyle | Yesterday's Echo | |
| 2014 | Novel | William Kent Krueger | Ordinary Grace | |
| 2014 | Paperback Original | Catriona McPherson | As She Left It | |
| 2014 | Short Story | John Connolly | "The Caxton Private Lending Library & Book Depository" | |
| 2015 | Critical / Non-Fiction Work | Hank Phillippi Ryan (ed.) | Writes of Passage: Adventures on the Writer's Journey | |
| 2015 | First Novel | Lori Rader-Day | The Black Hour | |
| 2015 | Novel | Laura Lippman | After I'm Gone | |
| 2015 | Paperback Original | Catriona McPherson | The Day She Died | |
| 2015 | Short Story | Art Taylor | "The Odds Are Against Us" | |
| 2016 | Anthology or Collection | Art Taylor (ed.) | Murder Under the Oaks | |
| 2016 | Critical / Non-Fiction Work | Val McDermid | Forensics: What Bugs, Burns, Prints, DNA and More Tell Us About Crime | |
| 2016 | First Novel | Glen Erik Hamilton | Past Crimes | |
| 2016 | Novel | Chris Holm | The Killing Kind | |
| 2016 | Paperback Original | Lou Berney | The Long and Faraway Gone | |
| 2016 | Short Story | Megan Abbott | The Little Men | |
| 2016 | Young Adult Novel | Joelle Charbonneau | Need | |
| 2017 | Anthology or Collection | Greg Herren (ed.) | Blood on the Bayou: Bouchercon Anthology 2016 | |
| 2017 | Critical / Non-Fiction Work | Ruth Franklin | Shirley Jackson: A Rather Haunted Life | |
| 2017 | First Novel | Joe Ide | IQ | |
| 2017 | Novel | Louise Penny | A Great Reckoning | |
| 2017 | Novella | B.K. Stevens | The Last Blue Glass | |
| 2017 | Paperback Original | James W. Ziskin | Heart of Stone | |
| 2017 | Short Story | Megan Abbott | "Oxford Girl" | |
| 2017 | Young Adult Novel | April Henry | The Girl I Used to Be | |
| 2018 | Anthology | Gary Phillips (ed.) | The Obama Inheritance | |
| 2018 | Critical / Non-Fiction Work | David Grann | Killers of the Flower Moon: The Osage Murders and the Birth of the FBI | |
| 2018 | First Novel | Kellye Garrett | Hollywood Homicide | |
| 2018 | Novel | Attica Locke | Bluebird, Bluebird | |
| 2018 | Online Content | Jungle Red Writers | | |
| 2018 | Paperback Original | Lori Rader-Day | The Day I Died | |
| 2018 | Short Story | Hilary Davidson | "My Side of the Matter" | |
| 2018 | Bill Crider Award for Novel in a Series | Sue Grafton | "Y" is for Yesterday | |
| 2019 | Critical / Non-Fiction Work | Michelle McNamara | I'll Be Gone in the Dark | |
| 2019 | First Novel | Oyinkan Braithwaite | My Sister, the Serial Killer | |
| 2019 | Novel | Lou Berney | November Road | |
| 2019 | Paperback Original | Lori Rader-Day | Under a Dark Sky | |
| 2019 | Short Story | S. A. Cosby | The Grass Beneath My Feet | |

=== 2020s ===
| Year | Category | Author | Title |
|---|---|---|---|
| 2020 | Anthology or Collection | Verena Rose, Rita Owen, and Shawn Reilly Simmons (eds.) | Malice Domestic 14: Mystery Most Edible |
| 2020 | Critical / Non-Fiction Work | Mo Moulton | The Mutual Admiration Society: How Dorothy L. Sayers and her Oxford Circle Remade the World for Women |
| 2020 | First Novel | Tara Laskowski | One Night Gone |
| 2020 | Novel | Hank Phillippi Ryan | The Murder List |
| 2020 | Paperback Original | Gigi Pandian | The Alchemist’s Illusion |
| 2020 | Short Story | Alex Segura | The Red Zone |
| 2020 | Young Adult | Jen Conley | Seven Ways to Get Rid of Harry |
| 2021 | Anthology or Collection | Heather Graham (editor) | Shattering Glass: A Nasty Woman Press Anthology |
| 2021 | Critical/Non-Fiction Work | Sarah Weinman | Unspeakable Acts: True Tales of Crime Murder, Deceit, and Obsession |
| 2021 | First Novel | David Heska Wanbli Weiden | Winter Counts |
| 2021 | Novel | S. A. Cosby | Blacktop Wasteland |
| 2021 | Paperback Original | Jess Lourey | Unspeakable Things |
| 2021 | Short Story | Alex Segura | "90 Miles" |
| 2021 | Young Adult | Richie Narvaez | Holly Hernandez and the Death of Disco |
| 2022 | Anthology or Collection | Hank Phillippi Ryan (editor) | This Time for Sure: Bouchercon Anthology 2021 |
| 2022 | Critical/Non-Fiction Work award | Lee Child and Laurie R. King | How To Write a Mystery: A Handbook From Mystery Writers of America |
| 2022 | First Novel | Mia P. Manansala | Arsenic and Adobo |
| 2022 | Novel | S. A. Cosby | Razorblade Tears |
| 2022 | Paperback Original | Jess Lourey | Bloodline |
| 2022 | Short Story | S. A. Cosby | “Not My Cross to Bear” |
| 2022 | Young Adult | Alan Orloff | I Play One on TV |
| 2023 | Anthology | S. J. Rozan (editor) | Crime Hits Home: A Collection of Stories from Crime Fiction’s Top Authors |
| 2023 | Children’s/Young Adult | Nancy Springer | Enola Holmes and the Elegant Escapade |
| 2023 | Critical/Non-fiction | Martin Edwards | The Life of Crime: Detecting the History of Mysteries and Their Creators |
| 2023 | First Novel | Nita Prose | The Maid |
| 2023 | Hardcover | Kellye Garrett | Like a Sister |
| 2023 | Historical | Wanda M. Morris | Anywhere You Run |
| 2023 | Humorous | Catriona McPherson | Scot in a Trap |
| 2023 | Paperback/E-book/Audiobook | Jess Lourey | The Quarry Girls |
| 2023 | Short Story | Barb Goffman | “Beauty and the Beyotch” |
| 2024 | Anthology | Holly West (editor) | Killin' Time in San Diego |
| 2024 | Children’s/Young Adult | Nancy Springer | Enola Holmes and the Mark of the Mongoose |
| 2024 | Critical/Non-fiction | Timothy Egan | A Fever in the Heartland |
| 2024 | First Novel | Nina Simon | Mother-Daughter Murder Night |
| 2024 | Hardcover | S.A. Cosby | All the Sinners Bleed |
| 2024 | Paperback/E-book/Audiobook | Tracy Clark | Hide |
| 2024 | Short Story | Dru Ann Love & Kristopher Zgorski | “Ticket to Ride” |
| 2025 | Anthology or Collection | Heather Graham (editor) | Tales of Music, Murder, and Mayhem |
| 2025 | Children’s/Young Adult | Suja Sukumar | When Mimi Went Missing |
| 2025 | Cozy/Humorous | Rob Osler | Cirque du Slay |
| 2025 | Critical/Non-fiction | Katherine Ramsland & Tracy Ullman | The Serial Killer’s Apprentice |
| 2025 | First Novel | K. T. Nguyen | You Know What You Did |
| 2025 | Hardcover | Liz Moore | The God of the Woods |
| 2025 | Historical | John Shen Yen Nee & S. J. Rozan | The Murder of Mr. Ma |
| 2025 | Paperback | Tracy Clark | Echo |
| 2025 | Paranormal | Olivia Blacke | A New Lease on Death |
| 2025 | Short Story | Curtis Ippolito | “Something to Hold Onto” |
| 2026 | Anthology or Collection | Curtis Ippolito (editor) | On Fire and Under Water: A Climate Change Crime Fiction Anthology |
| 2026 | Children’s/Young Adult | Mia P. Manansala | Death in the Cards |
| 2026 | Critical/Non-fiction | Dawn M. Barclay | Vacations Can Be Murder: A True Crime Lover’s Travel Guide to New England |
| 2026 | First Novel | Laurie L. Dove | Mask of the Deer Woman |
| 2026 | Hardcover | Louise Penny | The Black Wolf |
| 2026 | Paperback/E-book/Audiobook | Tracy Clark | Edge |
| 2026 | Short Story | Mindy Carlson | “AITA for Using My Husband’s Hobby to Teach Him a Lesson” |
