= Ken Tanaka =

Ken Tanaka may refer to:

- Ken Tanaka (actor), Japanese actor
- Ken Tanaka, a character from the TV Series Glee
- Ken Tanaka, the protagonist in the mystery novels by Dale Furutani.
