= Joe Clifford =

American author and editor

Joe Clifford is an American author and editor. His work crosses genres but features mystery and crime fiction. Past struggles with addiction, about which he is candid, have fundamentally influenced his writing.

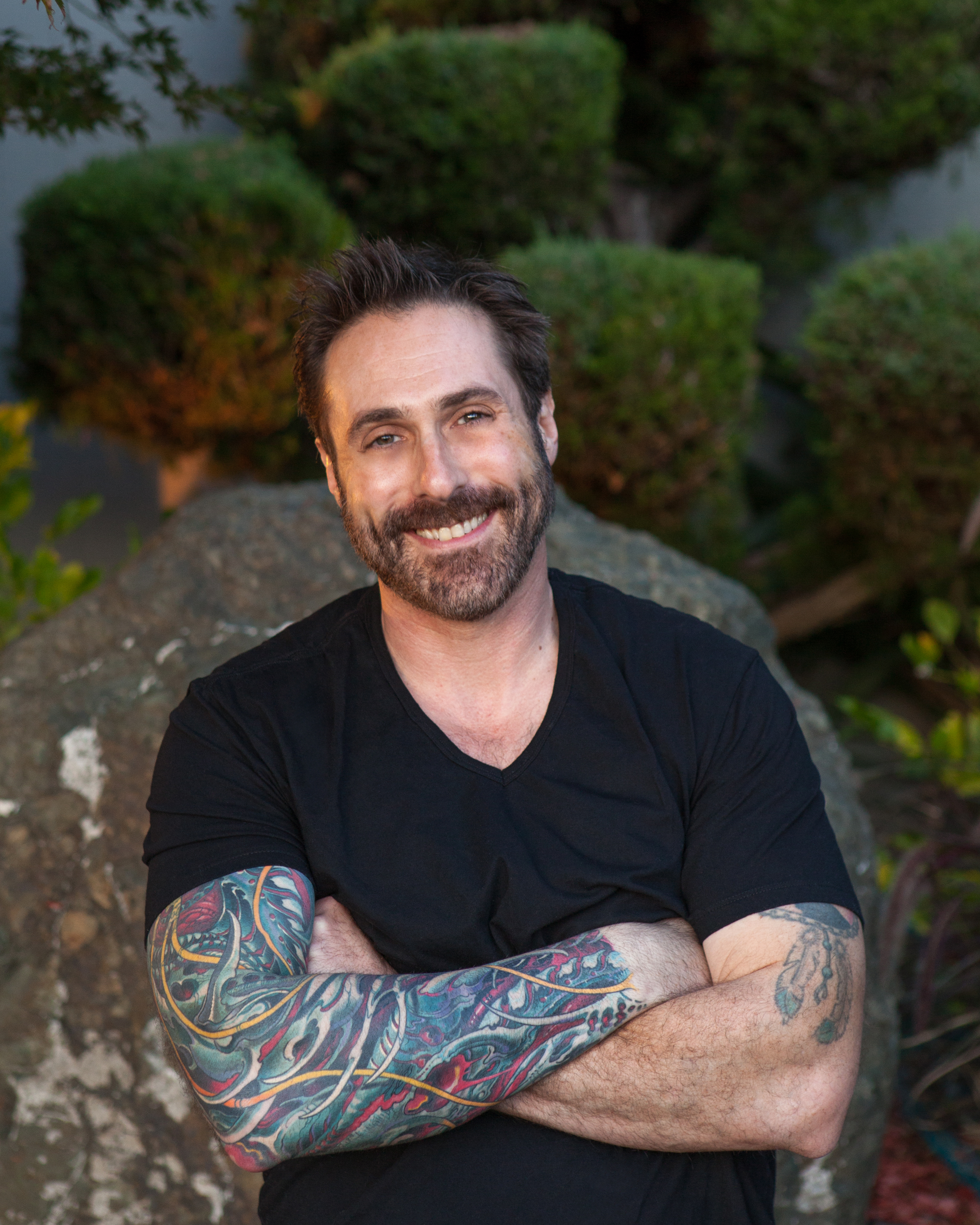
Joe Clifford, press photo

== Background ==
Clifford, a native of Berlin, Connecticut, quit Central Connecticut State University and moved to San Francisco in 1992 to pursue a career in rock 'n' roll music. While there, Clifford fell into heroin addiction, which lasted until he hit bottom in 2001. After numerous failed attempts at rehab, he finally embarked on a lasting recovery. He pursued a new direction, earning an MFA in creative writing at Florida International University, where he studied under James W. Hall, Les Standiford, and Lynne Barrett.

Clifford's personal memoir-cum-novel, Junkie Love (2013), portrays his descent and recovery. Addiction is also a prominent theme in his "Jay Porter" mystery series. In interviews, Clifford has described his credo as a writer as "gritty, real and raw," which is also the motto he has given to a series of lectures that he has produced. These lectures, he has said, "mine true stories of the marginalized to laugh, cringe and shine a light on the human condition."

== Awards and recognitions ==
Clifford received an Acker Award in 2013. This tribute, named for Kathy Acker, is given to members of the avant garde arts community who have made outstanding contributions in their discipline in defiance of convention, or else served their fellow writers and artists in outstanding ways.

Previously, in 2012, Clifford was nominated for a Pushcart Prize for his story "Stuck Between Stations."

He went on to be nominated twice in 2015 for an Anthony Award, both as novelist and editor. He also received two Anthony Award nominations in 2018, for Best Novel in a Series and editor.

Clifford's Rag and Bone was nominated in 2020 for Best Hardcover Novel in the International Thriller Writers Awards.

== Bibliography ==
Clifford's first three books were the following:

- Choice Cuts (2012): A collection of short stories. ISBN 978-1480000926
- Junkie Love (2013, re-released in 2018 with a new foreword by Jerry Stahl and afterword by Clifford, re-released again in 2025): A personal memoir-cum-novel billed as "a story of recovery and redemption." ISBN 978-1960725271. Excerpted in Books & Recovery, Spring 2025
- Wake the Undertaker (2013): A noir thriller set in an alternative, darker Bay Area city. ISBN 978-1484138533

They were followed by the Jay Porter series, featuring a New Hampshire man who faces a variety of mysteries and personal challenges.

- Lamentation (2014): Nominated for an Anthony Award in 2015 for Best Novel. ISBN 978-1608091850
- December Boys (2015): ISBN 978-1608092499
- Give Up the Dead (2017): Nominated for an Anthony Award in 2018 (the Bill Crider Award for Best Novel in a Series). ISBN 978-1608092048
- Broken Ground (2018): ISBN 978-1608092437
- Rag and Bone (2019): Nominated by International Thriller Writers for Best Hardcover Novel in 2020. ISBN 978-1608093267

An additional trio of standalone novels was written at the same time as the Porter series.

- The One That Got Away (2018): A psychological thriller. ISBN 978-1948235426
- Skunk Train (2019): A modern-day love story set against the backdrop of the Northern California marijuana trade. ISBN 978-1643960555
- Occam's Razor (2020): A thriller set in Miami. ISBN 978-1643961064

These works also appeared from 2020 on:

- The Lakehouse (2020): Psychological thriller set in Connecticut. ISBN 978-1951709105
- The Shadow People (2021): Psychological thriller with elements of horror. ISBN 978-1951709402
- Say My Name (2023): A "true crime novel". ISBN 978-1960725028
- All Who Wander (2023): Psychological thriller revolving around a woman's disappearance. ISBN 9781960725097
- A Moth to Flame (2024): Mystery/psychological thriller featuring a woman who seeks the truth about her sister's death. ISBN 9781960725110

Forthcoming releases:

- The Skeleton Theory (February 2026): Supernatural horror thriller.

Clifford has contributed to these short-story collections:

- Culprits (2018): Linked anthology following the aftermath of a heist. ISBN 978-1947993020. Developed into a TV series for Disney+ debuting in the fall of 2021, created and directed by J Blakeson.
- The Eviction of Hope (2021): Crime fiction anthology about the residents of a low-end Spokane dwelling targeted for redevelopment. ISBN 978-1736854327. Clifford's entry was co-authored with his old friend and fellow author Tom Pitts.

He has also edited the following short-story collections:

- Trouble in the Heartland (2014): Crime Stories Inspired by the Songs of Bruce Springsteen. Nominated for an Anthony Award in 2015 for Best Anthology/Short Story Collection. In shepherding the project, Clifford was able to bring his fellow FIU creative writing program alum Dennis Lehane on board to write the leadoff story. Clifford, who counts Springsteen as a major writing influence, wrote the introduction. ISBN 978-1939751027
- Hard Sentences (2017): Crime Fiction Inspired by Alcatraz (co-editor with David James Keaton). ISBN 978-1940885377
- Just to Watch Them Die (2017): Crime Fiction Inspired by the Songs of Johnny Cash. Nominated for an Anthony Award in 2018 for Best Anthology. ISBN 978-1939751249

== Additional literary activity ==
Clifford also serves as acquisitions editor for Gutter Books. Previously, he was producer of Lip Service West, a reading series in Oakland, California. He was also one of the chief editors for "Out of the Gutter Online" (a website for flash fiction affiliated with Gutter Books).

He teaches writing as well, including online classes for LitReactor.com and instruction at conferences and retreats.

== Ongoing musical pursuits ==
Clifford has continued to record with his band, The Wandering (previously known as The Wandering Jews).

== Personal life ==
Clifford is the father of two sons, Holden and Jackson Kerouac, named after his literary heroes.
