= Bouchercon XLVI =

2015 mystery and detective fiction convention

- "Murder Under the Oaks"
- Date: October 8, 2015
- Location: Raleigh, NC
- Country: USA
- Hosted by: Al Abramson

Bouchercon is an annual convention of creators and devotees of mystery and detective fiction. It is named in honour of writer, reviewer, and editor Anthony Boucher; also the inspiration for the Anthony Awards, which have been issued at the convention since 1986. This page details Bouchercon XLVI and the 2015 Anthony Awards ceremony.

== Bouchercon ==
The convention was held at Raleigh, North Carolina from 8–11 October 2015. The event was chaired by Al Abramson.

=== Special guests ===
- Lifetime Achievement: Margaret Maron
- American Guests of Honor: Dr. Kathy Reichs & Tom Franklin
- International Guests of Honor: Zoë Sharp & Allan Guthrie
- Toastmasters: Lori Armstrong & Sean Doolittle
- Local Guest of Honor: Sarah Shaber
- Fan Guests of Honor: Lucinda Surber & Stan Ulrich
- The David Thompson Memorial Special Service Award: Bill and Toby Gottfried

== Anthony Awards ==
The following list details the awards distributed at the 2015 annual Anthony Awards ceremony.

=== Best Novel ===
Winner:

- Laura Lippman, After I’m Gone

Shortlist:

- Joe Clifford, Lamentation
- Tana French, The Secret Place
- Louise Penny, The Long Way Home
- Hank Phillippi Ryan - Truth Be Told

=== Best First Novel ===
Winner:

- Lori Rader-Day, The Black Hour

Shortlist:

- Kristi Belcamino, Blessed Are the Dead
- M.P. Cooley, Ice Shear
- Julia Dahl, Invisible City
- Allen Eskens, The Life We Bury

=== Best Paperback Original ===
Winner:

- Catriona McPherson, The Day She Died

Shortlist:

- Alison Gaylin, Stay With Me
- Alex Marwood, The Killer Next Door
- Ben H. Winters, World of Trouble
- James W. Ziskin, No Stone Unturned

=== Best Critical Non-fiction Work ===
Winner:

- Hank Phillippi Ryan, Writes of Passage: Adventures on the Writer’s Journey

Shortlist:

- Charles Brownson, The Figure of the Detective: A Literary History and Analysis
- Kate Clark Flora, Death Dealer: How Cops and Cadaver Dogs Brought a Killer to Justice
- Dru Ann Love, Dru’s Book Musings
- J.W. Ocker, Poe-Land: The Hallowed Haunts of Edgar Allan Poe

=== Best Short Story ===
Winner:

- Art Taylor, “The Odds Are Against Us” from Ellery Queen Mystery Magazine

Shortlist:

- Craig Faustus Buck, “Honeymoon Sweet” from Murder at the Beach: The Bouchercon Anthology 2014
- Barb Goffman, "The Shadow Knows” from Chesapeake Crimes: Homicidal Holidays
- Paul D. Marks, “Howling at the Moon” Ellery Queen Mystery Magazine, Nov 2014
- John Shepphird, “Of Dogs and Deceit” from Alfred Hitchcock Mystery Magazine, Nov 2014

=== Best Anthology or Collection ===
Winner:

- Laurie R. King & Leslie S. Klinger, In the Company of Sherlock Holmes: Stories Inspired by the Holmes Canon

Shortlist:

- David Baldacci, FaceOff
- Dana Cameron, Murder at the Beach: The Bouchercon Anthology 2014
- Joe Clifford, Trouble in the Heartland: Crime Fiction Inspired by the Songs of Bruce Springsteen
- Karen Pullen, Carolina Crimes: 19 Tales of Love, Lust, and Longing
