= Caught Dead in Philadelphia =

1987 book written by Gillian Roberts

- First edition (h/b)
- Author: Gillian Roberts
- Genre: Mystery fiction, Thriller
- Published: 1987
- Publisher: Fawcett Publications (p/b); Scribner (h/b)
- Pages: 208
- Awards: Anthony Award for Best First Novel (1988)
- ISBN: 978-0-345-35340-5
- Website: Caught Dead in Philadelphia

Caught Dead in Philadelphia is a book written by Gillian Roberts and published by Scribner Press on 16 October 1987 which later went on to win the Anthony Award for Best First Novel in 1988.
