= The Black Hour =

2014 novel by Lori Rader-Day

- Author: Lori Rader-Day
- Genre: Mystery fiction, Thriller, Crime, Suspense
- Published: 2014
- Publisher: Seventh Street Books
- Pages: 331
- Awards: Anthony Award for Best First Novel (2015)
- ISBN: 978-1-616-14885-0
- Website: The Black Hour

The Black Hour is a 2014 novel written by Lori Rader-Day and published by Seventh Street Books on July 8, 2014, which later went on to win the Anthony Award for Best First Novel in 2015.
