= Susan Dunlap =

American writer

- Born: Susan D. Sullivan; June 20, 1943 (age 83); Kew Gardens, Queens, New York
- Education: Bucknell University, B.A. 1965; University of North Carolina, M.A.T. 1966
- Occupations: Mystery writer, social worker
- Spouses: Newell Dunlap (1970)
- Writing career
- Notable awards: Macavity Award; Anthony Award
- Website: Susan Dunlap

Susan Dunlap (born June 20, 1943) is an American writer of mystery novels and short stories. Her novels have mostly appeared in one of four series, each with its own sleuthing protagonist: Vejay Haskell, Jill Smith, Kiernan O'Shaughnessy, or Darcy Lott. Through 2020, more than two dozen of Dunlap's book-length mysteries have appeared in print. She has also edited crime fiction and has contributed to anthologies, including A Woman's Eye (1991), and to periodicals such as Ellery Queen's Mystery Magazine and Alfred Hitchcock's Mystery Magazine. Her short story "Checkout" won a Macavity Award and an Anthony Award in 1994.

Dunlap was a founding member of Sisters in Crime and served as its president in 1990–91. Before becoming a full-time writer in 1984, she was a social worker in Baltimore (1966–67), New York City (1967), and Contra Costa County, California (1968–84). She has also worked as a paralegal, private investigator, and yoga teacher.

== Personal life ==
Born in Kew Gardens, Queens, New York, Dunlap graduated from Bucknell University with a B.A. in 1965 and from the University of North Carolina with a Master of Arts in Teaching in 1966. She married Newell Dunlap in 1970. In 2020, the Dunlaps live near San Francisco.

== Critical reception ==
=== Reviews ===
Carol M. Harper in St. James Guide to Crime and Mystery Writers said in 1996 that "Dunlap has coupled authenticity in setting with a bizarre sense of humor appropriate for Northern California. Her series feature radically different heroines (amateur detective, police officer and licensed private detective) from three different backgrounds (rural northern California, urban northern California, and East Coast transplant to urban Southern California) to create three eminently readable series." Harper also praised Dunlap for her abilities as a writer of short stories and an editor of crime-story anthologies.

Kirkus Reviews praises Time Expired, featuring Berkeley, California, homicide detective Jill Smith, as "an adroitly plotted, consistently interesting police procedural."

=== Awards ===
Pious Deception (1989) and Rogue Wave were finalists for the Anthony Award for Best Novel.

== Bibliography ==
=== Mystery series ===
Vejay Haskell

- An Equal Opportunity Death (1984)
- The Bohemian Connection (1985)
- The Last Annual Slugfest (1986)

Jill Smith

- Karma (1981)
- As a Favor (1984)
- Not Exactly a Brahmin (1985)
- Too Close to the Edge (1987)
- A Dinner to Die For (1987)
- Diamond in the Buff (1990)
- Death and Taxes (1992)
- Time Expired (1993)
- Sudden Exposure (1996)
- Cop Out (1997)

Kiernan O'Shaughnessy

- Pious Deception (1989)
- Rogue Wave (1991)
- High Fall (1994)
- No Immunity (1998)

Darcy Lott

- A Single Eye (2006)
- Hungry Ghosts (2008)
- Civil Twilight (2009)
- Power Slide (2010)
- No Footprints (2012)
- Switchback (2015)
- Out of Nowhere (2016)

=== Short story collections ===
- The Celestial Buffet and Other Morsels of Murder (2001)
- Karma and Other Stories (2002)
- No Safety and Other Short Stories (2014)

=== Other ===
- Deadly Allies II: Private Eye Writers of America and Sisters in Crime Collaborative Anthology, editor, with Robert J. Randisi (1994)
- Fast Friends (novel) (2004)
