= Bouchercon XXI =

1990 mystery and detective fiction convention

- Date: September 21, 1990
- Location: London, England
- Country: United Kingdom
- Hosted by: Marion & Robin Richmond

Bouchercon is an annual convention of creators and devotees of mystery and detective fiction. It is named in honour of writer, reviewer, and editor Anthony Boucher; also the inspiration for the Anthony Awards, which have been issued at the convention since 1986. This page details Bouchercon XXI and the 5th Anthony Awards ceremony.

== Bouchercon ==
The convention was held in London, England on September 21, 1990; running until the 23rd. The event was chaired by Marion & Robin Richmond, owners of Scottish book-store Ming Books, known for having the largest stock of crime fiction in the UK.

=== Special Guests ===
- Lifetime Achievement award — Michael Gilbert
- Guest of Honor — P.D. James
- Fan Guest of Honor — Robert Adey
- Toastmaster — Sue Grafton

== Anthony Awards ==
The following list details the awards distributed at the fifth annual Anthony Awards ceremony.

=== Novel award ===
Winner:

- Sarah Caudwell, The Sirens Sang of Murder

Shortlist:

- Susan Dunlap, Pious Deception
- Carolyn G. Hart, A Little Class On Murder
- Margaret Maron, Corpus Christmas

=== First novel award ===
Winner:

- Karen Kijewski, Katwalk

Shortlist:

- Jill Churchill, Grime and Punishment
- Melodie Johnson Howe , The Mother Shadow
- Edith Skom, The Mark Twain Murders
- Susan Wolfe, The Last Billable Hour

=== Paperback original award ===
Winner:

- Carolyn G. Hart, Honeymoon with Murder

Shortlist:

- Malacai Black, On My Honor
- D.R. Meredith, Murder By Deception
- Keith Peterson, Rough Justice
- Deborah Valentine, A Collector of Photographs

=== Short story award ===
Winner:

- Nancy Pickard, "Afraid all the Time", from Sisters in Crime

Shortlist:

- Susan Dunlap, "No Safety", from Sisters in Crime
- Sharyn McCrumb, "A Wee Doch and Doris", from Mistletoe Mysteries
- Shelly Singer, "A Terrible Thing", from Sisters in Crime

=== Movie award ===
Winner:

- Crimes and Misdemeanors

Shortlist:

No shortlist released

=== Television series award ===
Winner:

- Inspector Morse

Shortlist:

No shortlist released
