= Teri Holbrook =

American mystery writer

- Born: Teri Jill Peitso; Atlanta, Georgia, U.S.
- Occupation: novelist
- Writing career
- Genre: Fiction
- Subjects: Mystery, Crime fiction

Teri Peitso-Holbrook (born Teri Jill Peitso) is an American mystery writer living in Atlanta with her husband and two children. She is the author of four mysteries and has been nominated for several literary awards. She currently teaches at Georgia State University and is pursuing multimodal and digital writing.

Since December 7, 1985, Holbrook has been married to Bill Holbrook. They have two daughters, Chandler and Haviland.

== Awards ==
Holbrook's début novel, A Far and Deadly Cry, was nominated for "Best Paperback Original" at the 1996 Anthony Awards and for the "Best First Novel" Agatha Award in the same year. The following year, her second novel, The Grass Widow, was nominated for "Best Paperback Original" at the 1997 Anthony Awards, Barry Awards and the Edgar Awards; as well as "Best Novel" at the Agatha Awards also. Her 2001 novel, The Mother Tongue, was also nominated for the 2002 Edgar Award for "Best Paperback Original".

== Publications ==
- A Far and Deadly Cry (1995)
- The Grass Widow (1996)
- Sad Water (1999)
- The Mother Tongue (2001)
