= Alan Russell =

American novelist (born 1956)

- Born: June 4, 1956 (age 70); United States
- Education: University of California, San Diego
- Occupation: Novelist
- Spouse: Laura Russell
- Children: 3
- Parent(s): Mark E. Russell; Carolyn Lois Russell
- Writing career
- Language: English
- Genre: Crime fiction

Alan Russell (born June 4, 1956) is an American novelist.

== Early life and education ==
Alan Russell was born the youngest of four children of Mark E. Russell and Carolyn Lois Russell. He grew up in Sunnyvale, California, where his father was a city councilman and mayor. His grandfather and great-grandfather were also mayors. Russell's parents met while serving in the Navy, where his father was second-in-command of a tug in Alaska and his mother was a naval flight nurse who tended to the wounded being flown out of Korea. She was also a member of the Ninety-Nines, an international organization for female pilots.

Russell's early childhood was spent in Sunnyvale and in Short Hills, New Jersey. In 1972, Russell's family moved to La Jolla, California. He played varsity basketball for two years, and in his senior year ended up second-team All-Coast League. Russell went to UC San Diego and was the first Triton player to ever make the varsity basketball team as a freshman, but a back injury caused him to quit the team late in the season. While healing, Russell found a writing outlet in the student newspaper, The Triton Times. By the time he was a senior, Russell was the paper's editor-in-chief. Under his tenure, the newspaper became independent of the university (it was later renamed The Guardian).

== Career ==
After graduating from UC San Diego, Russell worked for 20 years in the hospitality industry. He freelanced newspaper and magazine articles while working on his novels, using the hospitality industry as a backdrop to some of his fiction.

Russell's short story, "Married to a Murderer," was selected as one of 1997's 25 finest crime and mystery stories by Iblist Shortlist and published as the sixth annual edition. and was performed on stage in Carlsbad, California in April 2012. In 1990 Walker & Company published No Sign of Murder, which received a review from The New York Times. The work was followed by The Forest Prime Evil and comedic mysteries The Hotel Detective and The Fat Innkeeper which won him The Lefty award for best comedic mystery of the year, and a Critics’ Choice Award His novel Multiple Wounds, a psychological thriller earned him a nomination for both an Anthony Award and the Macavity Award for best novel of the year. Russell then published Shame, a novel of psychological suspense. His next books, Exposure, Political Suicide, and Burning Man, have been categorized as suspense novels. He wrote a screenplay for Disney of his novel St. Nick. A number of his novels have been optioned for film.

Russell's novel Guardians of the Night (January 1, 2015) made it to number one on the Amazon bestseller list.

Russell's twentieth novel The Dead Detective was published in November 2025 by Bloodhound Books.

== Personal life ==
Russell's wife Laura is a licensed clinical social worker. They are the parents of three children.

== Novels ==
- No Sign of Murder (1990, ISBN 0-8027-5767-7)
- The Forest Prime Evil (1992, ISBN 0-8027-3204-6)
- The Hotel Detective (1994, ISBN 0-89296-538-X)
- The Fat Innkeeper (1995, ISBN 0-89296-539-8)
- Multiple Wounds (1996, ISBN 0-684-81526-5)
- Shame (1998, ISBN 0-684-81527-3)
- Exposure (2002, ISBN 0-312-28924-3)
- Political Suicide (2003, ISBN 0-312-31418-3)
- Burning Man (2012, ISBN 1-612-18609-2)
- St. Nick (2013, ISBN 1-477-81845-6)
- Guardians of The Night (2015, ISBN 1-477-82584-3)
- A Cold War (October 2015, ISBN 1-503-94580-4)
- Lost Dog (2016, ISBN 978-1503935525)
- Homecoming (June 2017, ISBN 9781477820087)
- The Dead Detective (November 2025, ISBN 978-1917705554)
