= Bouchercon XXXV =

2004 mystery and detective fiction convention

- "Murder Among the Maples"
- Date: October 7, 2004
- Location: Toronto, Ontario
- Country: Canada
- Hosted by: Al Navis

Bouchercon is an annual convention of creators and devotees of mystery and detective fiction. It is named in honour of writer, reviewer, and editor Anthony Boucher; also the inspiration for the Anthony Awards, which have been issued at the convention since 1986. This page details Bouchercon XXXV and the 19th Anthony Awards ceremony.

== Bouchercon ==
The convention was held in Toronto, Ontario, Canada on October 7, 2004; running until the 10th. The event was chaired by Al Navis, owner of the Toronto-based mystery book-store, Handy Book Exchange.

=== Special Guests ===
- Lifetime Achievement award — Bernard Cornwell
- Canadian Guest of Honor — Peter Robinson
- British Guest of Honor — Lindsey Davis
- American Guest of Honor — Jeremiah Healy
- Fan Guest of Honor — Gary Warren Niebuhr
- Toast mistress — Natasha Cooper

== Anthony Awards ==
The following list details the awards distributed at the nineteenth annual Anthony Awards ceremony.

=== Novel award ===
Winner:

- Laura Lippman, Every Secret Thing

Shortlist:

- Giles Blunt, The Delicate Storm
- Steve Hamilton, Blood is the Sky
- Dennis Lehane, Shutter Island
- Peter Robinson, The Summer that Never Was

=== First novel award ===
Winner:

- P. J. Tracy, Monkeewrench

Shortlist:

- Erin Hart, Haunted Ground
- Rebecca Pawel, Death of a Nationalist
- Lono Waiwaiole, Wiley's Lament
- Jacqueline Winspear, Maisie Dobbs

=== Paperback original award ===
Winner:

- Robin Burcell, Deadly Legacy

Shortlist:

- Elaine Flinn, Dealing in Murder
- P. J. Parrish, Thicker than Water
- Jason Starr, Tough Luck
- Sylvia Maultash Warsh, Find Me Again

=== Short story award ===
Winner:

- Rhys Bowen, "Doppelganger", from Blood on their Hands

Shortlist:

- Sandy Balzo, "The Grass is Always Greener", from Ellery Queen's Mystery Magazine March 2003
- Jack Bludis, "Munchies", from Hardbroiled
- Eddie Muller, "Wanda Wilcox is "Trapped!"", from Plots With Guns September / October 2003
- Elaine Viets, "Red Meat", from Blood on their Hands

=== Critical / Non-fiction award ===
Winner:

- Gary Warren Niebuhr, Make Mine a Mystery: A Reader's Guide to Mystery and Detective Fiction

Shortlist:

- Colleen Barnett, Mystery Women: An Encyclopedia of Leading Women Characters in Mystery Fiction, Vol III
- Jane Doe, The Story of Jane Doe: A Book about Rape
- Jon Jordan, Interrogations
- Andrew Wilson, Beautiful Shadow: A Life of Patricia Highsmith

=== Young adult award ===
Winner:

- J. K. Rowling, Harry Potter and the Order of the Phoenix

Shortlist:

- Eoin Colfer, Artemis Fowl: The Eternity Code
- Bridget Crowley, Feast of Fools
- Kathleen Karr, Seventh Knot
- Norah McClintock, No Escape

=== Historical mystery award ===
Winner:

- Rhys Bowen, For the Love of Mike

Shortlist:

- Maureen Jennings, Let Loose the Dogs
- Olen Steinhauer, The Bridge of Sighs
- Sylvia Maultash Warsh, Find Me Again
- Jacqueline Winspear, Maisie Dobbs

=== Fan publication award ===
Winner:

- Kate Stine, Mystery Scene Magazine

Shortlist:

- George Easter, Deadly Pleasures
- Jim Huang, The Drood Review of Mystery
- Lynn Kaczmarek & Chris Aldrich, Mystery News
- Janet Rudolph, Mystery Readers Journal
