= International Thriller Writers =

Honorary society of thrillers authors

- Formation: October 9, 2004; 22 years ago
- Founder: Gayle Lynds, David Morrell
- Founded at: Toronto, Ontario, Canada
- Type: Writer's organization
- Legal status: Active
- Website: internationalthrillerwriters.com

International Thriller Writers (ITW), was founded October 9, 2004, at Bouchercon XXXV, the "World Mystery and Suspense Conference", in Toronto, Ontario, Canada. Six months later, some 150 authors with more than one billion books sold worldwide had joined the organization as founding members. As of October 5, 2014, the organization's website said it had more than 3,100 members in 28 countries.

== History ==
On October 9, 2004, at Bouchercon XXXV, the "World Mystery and Suspense Conference", in Toronto, Ontario, Canada, International Thriller Writers was founded. The organization was founded by Gayle Lynds and David Morrell and they became the organization's first co-presidents.

== Notable members / alumni ==
Notable members of International Thriller Writers include the following.

- David Baldacci
- Steve Berry
- Dale Brown
- Sandra Brown
- S.A. Cosby
- Lisa Gardner
- Brian Garfield
- David Liss
- Lee Child
- Lincoln Child
- Clive Cussler
- David Dun
- Joseph Finder
- Tess Gerritsen
- Raelynn Hillhouse
- Gregg Hurwitz
- Faye Kellerman
- Jonathan Kellerman
- John Lescroart
- Katherine Neville
- Ridley Pearson
- Kira Peikoff
- Douglas Preston
- M. J. Rose
- R. L. Stine
- M. Diane Vogt
- Stuart Woods

== Events and awards ==
This is the first professional organization for thriller authors. The first thriller festival (ThrillerFest) for readers was held in June 2006 in Scottsdale, Arizona, at which the International Thriller Writers Awards for outstanding work in the field were announced.

Other events and programs include:

- Debut Authors Program
- Online Thriller School
- The Big Thrill online magazine
- Write2Thrill.org knowledge portal (upcoming)
- ITW Town Halls - video seminars
- Operation Thriller - USO tour

== Publications ==
=== Thriller series ===
James Patterson edited the first anthology of all-original thriller short stories, titled Thriller: Stories to Keep You Up All Night, released in June 2006 by Mira.

Clive Cussler edited the second, titled Thriller 2: Stories You Just Can't Put Down, released May 26, 2009 by Mira.

Sandra Brown edited the third, titled Thriller 3: Love Is Murder, released May 29, 2012 by Mira.

=== Watchlist series ===
Jeffery Deaver; International Thriller Writers, Inc.; Alfred Molina (Narrator) (November 1, 2008). The Chopin Manuscript: A Serial Thriller. Brilliance Audio. ISBN 9781423377023. Originally broadcast weekly on Audible.com (25 September 2007 to 13 November 2007), as a 17-part serial. It is now available in other formats than audiobook.

Jeffery Deaver; International Thriller Writers, Inc.; Alfred Molina (Narrator) (2009). The Copper Bracelet. Brilliance Audio. ISBN 9781441830708. The sequel to The Chopin Manuscript.

== See also ==
- Conspiracy thriller
- Crime fiction
- Detective fiction
- Fiction
- Mystery fiction
- Spy fiction
- Techno-thriller
- Thriller film
- Whodunit
- List of authors
- List of crime writers
- List of detective fiction authors
- List of mystery writers
- List of thriller authors
