= Vicki Delany =

Canadian author

Vicki Delany (born Victoria Ann Cargo; 1951 in Winnipeg, Manitoba) is a Canadian mystery novelist. She is the author of nine mystery series, and a member of Crime Writers of Canada and Capital Crime Writers. Delany is a frequent panelist at mystery conferences such as Bouchercon and Malice Domestic in the United States and Bloody Words National Mystery Conference in Canada.

== Biography ==
Delany was employed by the Royal Bank of Canada as a computer programmer and systems analyst until retiring in 2007. She now lives in Prince Edward County, Ontario. She is the mother of three daughters (Caroline, Julia and Alex).

Delany is the author of the Constable Molly Smith mystery series, set in the fictional British Columbia town of Trafalgar (a thinly disguised Nelson, British Columbia), and the Klondike Mystery series, set in Dawson City, Yukon, during the Gold Rush of 1898. She is also the author of three novels of psychological suspense, set in Northern Ontario.

== Critical response ==
Scare the Light Away was the subject of a mixed review by Kirkus Reviews, which praised Delany's ability to create a tense atmosphere but felt that the mystery elements of the story were not as effective.

In the Shadow of the Glacier was described as "an intriguing series opener" by Publishers Weekly, which noted that Delany positioned the narrative well to continue into future works.

Valley of the Lost drew both praise and criticism from Kirkus Reviews, which described the novel's protagonists as "interesting" and the first three-quarters of the novel as "ingratiating", but then cited "exceptionally silly plotting" that sabotaged the book's ending.

Gold Digger received positive reviews from several publications. Writing for The Globe and Mail, Margaret Cannon noted a few anachronistic touches, but praised the novel's "great setting" and described it as "a lot of fun". In a review published in The Hamilton Spectator, Don Graves lauded the novel as "a captivating tale with lots of colour, ably researched detail and crisp dialogue that moves the story along, spinning into a satisfying, yet surprising, conclusion."

Winter of Secrets was criticized harshly by Kirkus Reviews, which described the novel as "a misstep" and blamed "lumpy prose and [a] none-too-serviceable plot".

== Works ==
=== A Catskill Summer Resort Mystery ===
1. Deadly Summer Nights (2021) ISBN 978-0-59333-437-9

=== Tea by the Sea Mysteries ===
1. Tea and Treachery (2020) ISBN 978-1-49672-506-6
2. Murder in a Teacup (2021) ISBN 978-1-49672-509-7

=== Lighthouse Library series (as Eva Gates) ===
1. By Book or By Crook (2015) ISBN 978-0-451-47093-5
2. Booked for Trouble (2015) ISBN 978-0-45147-094-2
3. Reading Up a Storm (2016) ISBN 978-0-45147-095-9
4. The Spook in the Stacks (2018) ISBN 978-1-68331-921-4
5. Something Read, Something Dead (2019) ISBN 978-1-64385-187-7
6. Read and Buried (2019) ISBN 978-1-64385-572-1
7. A Death Long Overdue (2020) ISBN 978-1-64385-680-3
8. Deadly Ever After (2021) ISBN 978-1-64385-588-2

=== Year-Round Christmas Mystery series ===
1. Rest Ye Murdered Gentlemen (2015) ISBN 978-0-42528-080-5
2. We Wish You A Murderous Christmas (2016) ISBN 978-0-42528-081-2
3. Hark the Herald Angels Slay (2017) ISBN 978-0-42528-082-9
4. Silent Night, Deadly Night (2019) ISBN 978-0-44000-030-3
5. Dying in a Winter Wonderland (2020) ISBN 978-0-593-19706-6

=== The Sherlock Holmes Bookshop series ===
1. Elementary, She Read (2017) ISBN 978-1-683-31096-9
2. Body on Baker Street (2017) ISBN 978-1-68331-461-5
3. The Cat of the Baskervilles (2018) ISBN 978-1-68331-471-4
4. A Scandal in Scarlet (2018) ISBN 978-1-643-85027-6
5. There’s a Murder Afoot (2020) ISBN 978-1-643-85573-8
6. A Curious Incident (2021) ISBN 978-1-643-85474-8
7. A Three Book Problem (2022) ISBN 978-1-64385-798-5

=== Ashley Grant Mystery series ===
1. White Sand Blues (2017) ISBN 978-1-45981-535-3
2. Blue Water Hues (2018) ISBN 978-1-45981-801-9
3. Coral Reef Views (2020) ISBN 978-1-45982-295-5

=== Constable Molly Smith and Winters series ===
1. In the Shadow of the Glacier (2007) ISBN 978-1-59058-558-0
2. Valley of the Lost (2009) ISBN 978-1-59058-688-4
3. Winter of Secrets (2009) ISBN 978-1-59058-781-2
4. Negative Image (2010) ISBN 978-1-59058-790-4
5. Among the Departed (2011) ISBN 978-1-59058-889-5
6. A Cold White Sun (2013) ISBN 978-1-46420-160-8
7. Under Cold Stone (2014) ISBN 978-1-46420-235-3
8. Unreasonable Doubt (2016) ISBN 978-1-46420-515-6

=== Ray Robertson series ===
1. Juba Good (2014) ISBN 978-1-45980-490-6
2. Haitian Graves (2015) ISBN 978-1-45980-898-0
3. Blood and Belonging (2017) ISBN 978-1-459-81284-0

=== Klondike Mystery series ===
1. Gold Digger (2009) ISBN 978-1-89491-780-3
2. Gold Fever (2010) ISBN 978-1-92660-702-3
3. Gold Mountain (2012) ISBN 978-1-45970-189-2
4. Gold Web (2013) ISBN 978-1-45970-772-6

=== Psychological suspense standalones ===
- White Out (2002) ISBN 978-1-55316-561-3
- Scare the Light Away (2005) ISBN 978-0-37306-280-5
- Burden of Memory (2006) ISBN 978-1-59058-993-9
- More Than Sorrow (2012) ISBN 978-1-59058-987-8
