= No Good Deeds =

2006 novel by Laura Lippman

- Author: Laura Lippman
- Genre: Mystery fiction, Crime
- Published: 2006
- Publisher: HarperCollins
- Pages: 400
- Awards: Anthony Award for Best Novel (2007)
- ISBN: 978-0-060-57073-6

No Good Deeds is a book written by Laura Lippman and published by HarperCollins in 2006, which won the Anthony Award for Best Novel in 2007.
