= Bouchercon XLIV =

2013 mystery and detective fiction convention

- "a New York State of crime…"
- Date: September 19, 2013
- Location: Albany, NY
- Country: USA
- Hosted by: Al Abramson

Bouchercon is an annual convention of creators and devotees of mystery and detective fiction. It is named in honour of writer, reviewer, and editor Anthony Boucher; also the inspiration for the Anthony Awards, which have been issued at the convention since 1986. This page details Bouchercon XLIV and the 2013 Anthony Awards ceremony.

== Bouchercon ==
The convention was held at Albany, New York from 19–23 September 2013. The event was chaired by Al Abramson.

=== Special guests ===
- Lifetime Achievement: Sue Grafton
- International Guest of Honor: Anne Perry
- American Guest of Honor: Tess Gerritsen
- Toastmaster: Steve Hamilton
- Fan Guests of Honor: Chris Aldrich & Lynn Kaczmarek
- The David Thompson Memorial Special Service Award: Marv Lachman

== Anthony Awards ==
The following list details the awards distributed at the 2013 annual Anthony Awards ceremony.

=== Best Novel ===
Winner:

- Louise Penny, The Beautiful Mystery

Shortlist:

- Megan Abbott, Dare Me
- Sean Chercover, The Trinity Game
- Gillian Flynn, Gone Girl
- Hank Phillippi Ryan, The Other Woman

=== Best First Novel ===
Winner:

- Chris Pavone, The Expats

Shortlist:

- Daniel Friedman, Don’t Ever Get Old
- Owen Laukkanen - The Professionals
- Matthew Quirk - The 500
- Michael Sears, Black Fridays

=== Best Paperback Original ===
Winner:

- Johnny Shaw, Big Maria

Shortlist:

- Lou Berney, Whiplash River
- Joelle Charbonneau, Murder for Choir
- Alison Gaylin, And She Was
- Malla Nunn, Blessed are the Dead

=== Best Short Story ===
Winner:

- Dana Cameron, "Mischief in Mesopotamia" from Ellery Queen's Mystery Magazine

Shortlist:

- Sheila Connolly, "Kept in the Dark" from Best New England Crime Stories: Blood Moon
- Barb Goffman, "The Lord is My Shamus" from Chesapeake Crimes: This Job is Murder
- Todd Robinson, "Peaches" from Grift, Spring 2012
- Karin Slaughter, "The Unremarkable Heart" from Mystery Writers of America Presents: Vengeance

=== Best Critical Non-fiction Work ===
Winner:

- John Connolly and Declan Burke, Books to Die For: The World’s Greatest Mystery Writers on the World’s Greatest Mystery Novels

Shortlist:

- Joseph Goodrich, Blood Relations: The Selected Letters of Ellery Queen, 1947-1950
- D.P. Lyle, M.D., More Forensics and Fiction: Crime Writers Morbidly Curious Questions Expertly Answered
- Mathew Prichard, The Grand Tour: Around the World with the Queen of Mystery Agatha Christie
- Otto Penzler, In Pursuit of Spenser: Mystery Writers on Robert B. Parker and the Creation of an American Hero
