= Honeymoon with Murder =

1988 book written by Carolyn Hart

- Author: Carolyn Hart
- Genre: Mystery fiction
- Published: 1988
- Publisher: Bantam Books
- Pages: 256
- Awards: Anthony Award for Best Paperback Original (1990)
- ISBN: 978-0-553-27608-4
- Website: Honeymoon with Murder

Honeymoon with Murder is a book written by Carolyn Hart and published by Bantam Books on 1 December 1988 which later went on to win the Anthony Award for Best Paperback Original in 1990.
