= Tracy Clark (author) =

American author of mystery novels

Tracy Clark (born 1961) is an American author of mystery novels. She won the G. P. Putnam's Sons Sue Grafton Memoriam Award in 2020 and 2022.

== Early life ==
Clark was raised in Chicago.

== Awards and honors ==
Awards for Clark's writing
Year	Title	Award		Result	Ref.
2019	Broken Places	Anthony Award for Best First Novel		Finalist	
2019	Broken Places	Lefty Award for Best Debut Mystery		Finalist	
2019	Broken Places	RUSA Reading List	Mystery	Shortlist	
2019	Broken Places	Shamus Award	First PI Novel	Finalist	
2020	Borrowed Time	Edgar Award	G. P. Putnam's Sons Sue Grafton Memoriam Award	Winner	
2020	Borrowed Time	Lefty Award	Mystery	Finalist	
2021	What You Don't See	Anthony Award	Hardcover Novel	Finalist	
2021	What You Don't See	Lefty Award	Mystery	Finalist	
2021	What You Don't See	Shamus Award	Novel	Finalist	
2022	Runner	Anthony Award	Novel	Finalist	
2022	Runner	Edgar Award	G. P. Putnam's Sons Sue Grafton Memoriam Award	Winner	
2022	Runner	Lefty Award	Mystery	Finalist	
2022	Runner	Shamus Award	Novel	Finalist	
2022	"Lucky Thirteen"	Edgar Awards	Short Story	Finalist	

== Publications ==
=== Cass Raines Chicago Mystery series ===
1. Broken Places. Kensington Publishing. 2018. ISBN 9781496714879.
2. Borrowed Time. Kensington Publishing. 2019. ISBN 9781496714909.
3. What You Don't See. Kensington Publishing. 2020. ISBN 9781496714930.
4. Runner. Kensington Publishing. 2021. ISBN 9781496732019.

=== Detective Harriet Foster series ===
1. Hide. Thomas & Mercer. 2023.
2. Fall. Thomas Mercer. 2023. ISBN 9781662509520.
3. Echo. Thomas & Mercer. 2024. ISBN 978-1662517327.
