= Rachel Howzell Hall =

American author (born 1970)

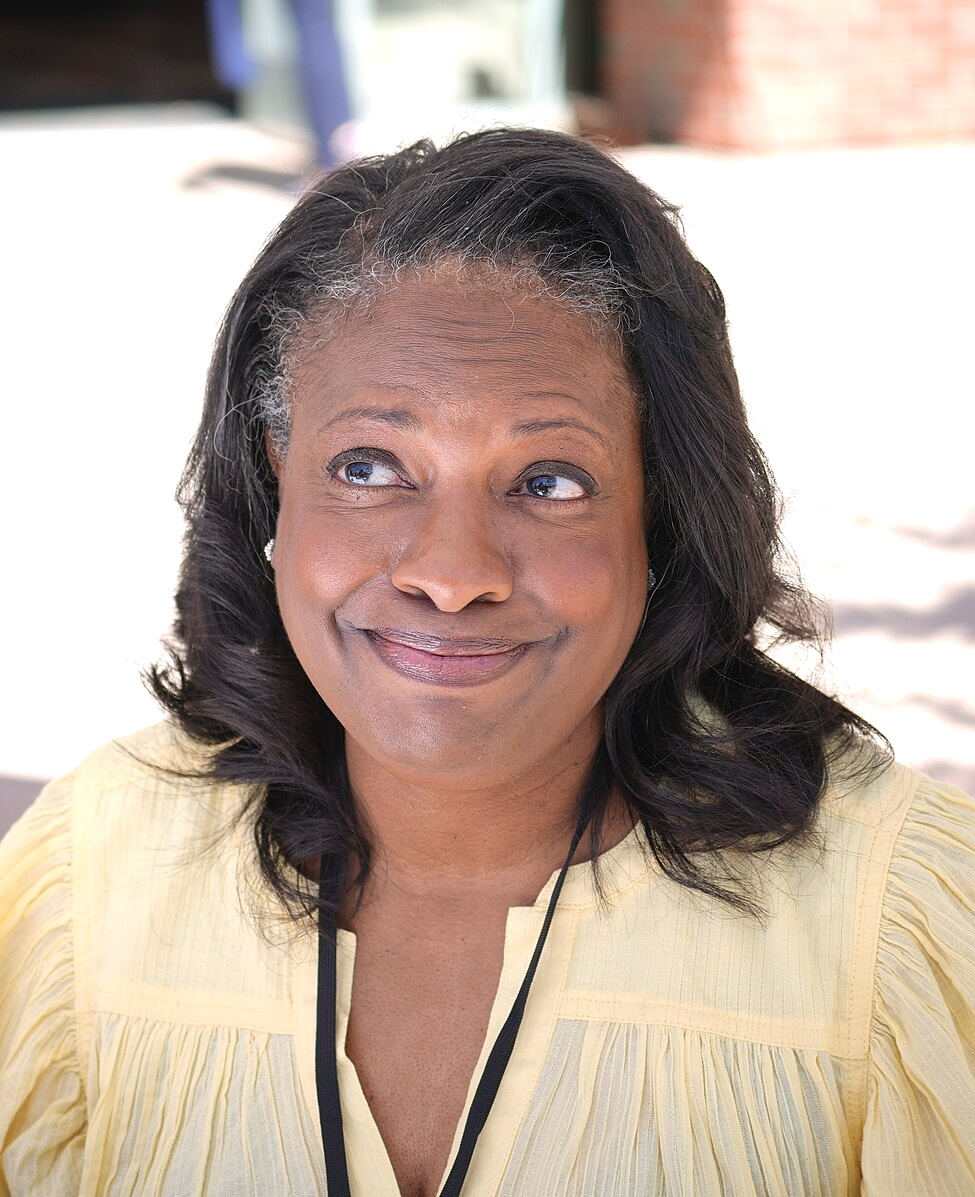
- Rachel Howzell Hall at the San Diego Writers Festival 2025
- Born: 1970 (age 55–56)

Rachel Howzell Hall (born 1970) is an American author of mystery and thriller novels. She is best known for her series featuring Detective Elouise Norton, including Land of Shadows (2014), Skies of Ash (2015), Trail of Echoes (2016), and City of Saviors (2017).

== Biography ==
Hall was born in 1970 and grew up in Los Angeles. Her family attended a Seventh-day Adventist Church.

At age 33, Hall was diagnosed with BRCA-positive breast cancer while she was pregnant with her first daughter.

In her late 30s, Hall was diagnosed with and treated for breast cancer.

Hall lives in Los Angeles with her family.

== Awards ==
In 2019, CrimeReads includedThey All Fall Down on their list of the year's best crime novels.

In 2020, Publishers Weekly included And Now She's Gone on their list of the year's best mystery and thriller novels. They included These Toxic Things on the list the following year.

Awards for Hall's writing
Year	Title	Award	Result	Ref.
2020	They All Fall Down	Anthony Award for Best Novel	Finalist	
2020	They All Fall Down	International Thriller Writers Award for Best Novel	Finalist	
2020	They All Fall Down	Lefty Award for Best Mystery	Finalist	
2020	And Now She’s Gone	Goodreads Choice Award for Best Thriller/Mystery	Nominee	
2020	And Now She’s Gone	Los Angeles Times Book Prize for Mystery/Thriller	Finalist	
2021	And Now She’s Gone	Anthony Award for Best Novel	Finalist	
2021	And Now She’s Gone	Barry Award for Best Novel	Finalist	
2021	And Now She’s Gone	Lefty Award for Best Mystery	Finalist	
2021	And Now She’s Gone	Shamus Award for Best Novel	Finalist	
2022	We Lie Here	Los Angeles Times Book Prize for Mystery/Thriller	Finalist	
2022	These Toxic Things	Anthony Award for Best Novel	Finalist	
2022	These Toxic Things	International Thriller Writers Award for Best Novel	Finalist	

== Publications ==
=== Essays ===
- Child, Lee; King, Laurie R., eds. (2021). "Finding Lou: The Police Procedural". How to Write a Mystery: A Handbook by Mystery Writers of America. Scribner. ISBN 9781982149437.
- Zackheim, Victoria, ed. (2020). "I Don't Know This Word". Private Investigations: Mystery Writers on the Secrets, Riddles, and Wonders in Their Lives. Seal Press. ISBN 9781580059213.

=== Novels ===
==== Detective Elouise Norton books ====
1. Land of Shadows. Forge Books. 2014. ISBN 9780765336354.
2. Skies of Ash. Forge Books. 2015. ISBN 9780765336361.
3. Trail of Echoes. Forge Books. 2016. ISBN 9780765381170.
4. City of Saviors. Forge Books. 2017. ISBN 9780765381194.

==== Valendor duology ====
1. The Last One. Entangled: Red Tower Books. 2024. ISBN 978-1649374905.
2. The Cruel Dawn. Entangled: Red Tower Books. 2025. ISBN 978-1649374905.

==== Haven Thrillers ====
1. Fog and Fury. Thomas & Mercer. 2025. ISBN 978-1662522833.
2. Mist and Malice. Thomas & Mercer. 2026. ISBN 978-1662522864.
3. Sand and Sorrow. Thomas & Mercer. 2027 ISBN 978-1662539039.

==== Standalone novels ====
- A Quiet Storm. Touchstone Books. 2002. ISBN 9780743226165.
- The View from Here. Amazon Digital Services. 2010.
- No One Knows You're Here. Beyond the Page. 2011.
- They All Fall Down. Forge Books. 2019. ISBN 9780765398147.
- And Now She's Gone. Forge Books. 2020. ISBN 9781250753175.
- These Toxic Things. Thomas & Mercer. 2021. ISBN 9781542027472.
- We Lie Here. Thomas & Mercer. 2022. ISBN 9781662500329.
- What Never Happened. Thomas & Mercer. 2023. ISBN 9781662504150.
- What Fire Brings. Thomas & Mercer. 2024. ISBN 9781662504174.

=== Novellas ===
- How It Ends. Audible Originals. 2021. ASIN B08Z4HPTXZ.
- See How They Run. Audible Originals. 2022. ASIN B09V5RHN39.
- Scorpions. Amazon Original Stories. 2024. ISBN 9781662517365. (Note: Scorpions is part of the Never Tell Collection.)

=== Short stories ===
- Phillips, Gary; Brewer, Richard, eds. (2015). "Do No Harm". Occupied Earth: Stories of Aliens, Resistance and Survival at all Costs. Polis Books. ISBN 9781940610528.
- Graham, Heather, ed. (2020). "Down Girl". Shattering Glass: A Nasty Woman Press Anthology. Nasty Women Press. ISBN 9781734387902.
