= Bouchercon XXX =

1999 mystery and detective fiction convention

- "Mischief in the Midwest"
- Date: September 30, 1999
- Location: Milwaukee, Wisconsin
- Country: USA
- Hosted by: Ted Hertel, Gary Warren Niebuhr

Bouchercon is an annual convention of creators and devotees of mystery and detective fiction. It is named in honour of writer, reviewer, and editor Anthony Boucher; it is also the inspiration for the Anthony Awards, which have been issued at the convention since 1986. This page details Bouchercon XXX and the 14th Anthony Awards ceremony.

== Bouchercon ==
The convention was held in Milwaukee, Wisconsin on September 30, 1999; running until October 3. The event was chaired by author Ted Hertel, and non-fiction author Gary Warren Niebuhr.

=== Special Guests ===
- Lifetime Achievement awards — Len & June Moffatt
- Guest of Honor — Max Allan Collins
- International Guest of Honor — Reginald Hill
- Fan Guests of Honor — Beverly DeWeese and Maggie Mason
- Toastmaster — Parnell Hall

== Anthony Awards ==
The following list details the awards distributed at the fourteenth annual Anthony Awards ceremony.

=== Novel award ===
Winner:

- Michael Connelly, Blood Work

Shortlist:

- Nevada Barr, Blind Descent
- Reginald Hill, On Beulah Height
- Dennis Lehane, Gone, Baby, Gone
- Aileen Schumacher, Framework for Death

=== First novel award ===
Winner:

- William Kent Krueger, Iron Lake

Shortlist:

- Jerrilyn Farmer, Sympathy for the Devil
- Jacqueline Fiedler, Tiger's Palette
- Steve Hamilton, A Cold Day in Paradise
- Donald Harstad, Eleven Days

=== Paperback original award ===
Winner:

- Laura Lippman, Butchers Hill

Shortlist:

- Sujata Massey, Zen Attitude
- Rick Riordan, Widower's Two-Step
- Caroline Roe, Remedy for Treason
- Steven Womack, Murder Manual

=== Short story award ===
Winner:

- Barbara D'Amato, "Of Course You Know that Chocolate is a Vegetable", from Ellery Queen's Mystery Magazine November 1998

Shortlist:

- Jan Burke, "Two Bits", from Ellery Queen's Mystery Magazine May 1998
- Harlan Coben, "A Simple Philosophy", from Malice Domestic 7
- Rick Riordan, "A Small Silver Gun", from Mary Higgins Clark Mystery Magazine
- Peter Robinson, "The Two Ladies of Rose Cottage", from Not Safe After Dark

=== Critical / Non-fiction award ===
Winner:

- George Easter, Deadly Pleasures

Shortlist:

- Alzina Stone Dale, Mystery Reader's Walking Guide: Washington, D.C.
- Eddie Muller, Dark City: The Lost World of Film Noir
- Victoria Nichols & Susan Thompson, Silk Stalkings: More Women Write of Murder
- Robin Winks & Maureen Corrigan, Mystery And Suspense writers: The Literature of Crime, Detection, and Espionage
