= Death Dances to a Reggae Beat =

2000 novel by Kate Grillery

- Author: Kate Grilley
- Genre: Thriller
- Published: 2000
- Publisher: Berkley Books
- Pages: 262
- Awards: Anthony Award for Best Paperback Original (2001)
- ISBN: 978-0-425-17506-4

Death Dances to a Reggae Beat is a novel written by Kate Grilley and published by Berkley Books on 1 June 2000 which later went on to win the Anthony Award for Best Paperback Original in 2001.
