= Liz Moore =

Liz Moore may refer to:

- Liz Moore (sculptor)
- Liz Moore (author)
