= The Heirs of Anthony Boucher =

2005 book by Marvin Lachman

- Author: Marvin Lachman
- Genre: Non-fiction, Mystery
- Published: 2005
- Publisher: Poisoned Pen Press
- Media type: Print
- Pages: 199
- Awards: Anthony Award for Best Critical Nonfiction (2006)
- ISBN: 978-1-590-58223-7

The Heirs of Anthony Boucher is a book written by Marvin Lachman and published by Poisoned Pen Press on 1 August 2005, which later went on to win the Anthony Award for Best Critical Nonfiction in 2006.
