= Marcia Talley =

American novelist

Marcia Talley is an American mystery novelist, author of the Hannah Ives mystery series, two collaborative novels, and numerous short stories. A former librarian, she took early retirement in 2000 to write full-time.

== Early life, education and career ==
Marcia was born in Cleveland, Ohio, the daughter of COL Thomas Chester Dutton, a career U.S. Marine Corps officer, and Lois Elizabeth Tuckerman Dutton, a registered nurse. On September 5, 1964 she married John Barry Talley.

Talley studied French at Oberlin College and obtained her B.A. in 1965. She was a librarian at Bryn Mawr School from 1968-1971. She then worked as a cataloguer at St. John's College in Annapolis. She received a master's degree from the University of Maryland, College Park in 1981. Later, Talley later worked for TeleSec Library Services, the American Bankers Association, the U.S. General Accounting Office and the U.S. Naval Academy Library.

Talley is a member of the Mystery Writers of America, Sisters in Crime, Authors Guild and the Crime Writers Association (UK). From 2009-2010 she served as national president of Sisters in Crime, Inc.

== Awards ==
- Romantic Times Reviewers Choice Awards, Best Contemporary Mystery, "Unbreathed Memories," 2000
- Agatha Award, Best Short Story, "Too Many Cooks," 2003
- Anthony Award, Best Short Story, "Too Many Cooks," 2003
- Agatha Award, Best Short Story, "Driven to Distraction," 2005
- Arts Council of Anne Arundel County "Annie" Award for Excellence in the Literary Arts, 2005
