= Jeffrey Marks =

American author (born 1960)

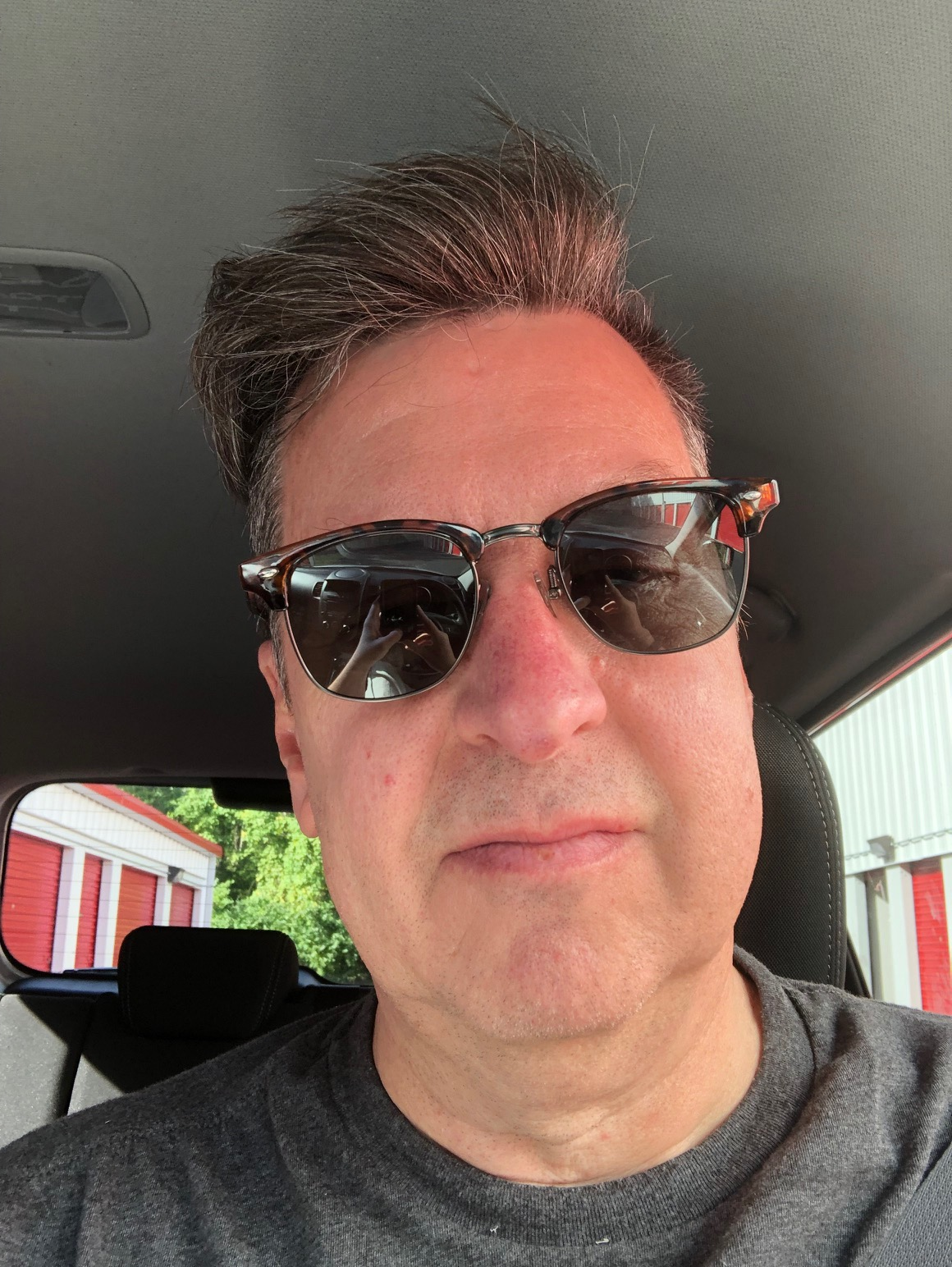

Jeffrey Marks (born October 8, 1960) is an American author.

== Career ==
Marks is best known for the series of literary criticisms he has written on American mystery authors of the middle twentieth century. His first work, Who Was That Lady? Craig Rice; Queen of the Screwball Mystery, was nominated for every major mystery award including the Edgar, the Agatha, the Anthony and the Macavity.

Marks' next work was Atomic Renaissance: Women Mystery Writers of the 1940s/1950s, which again was nominated for an Agatha.

Marks then wrote Intent to Sell: Marketing the Genre Novel. He became the moderator of Murder Must Advertise, a website and email group that discusses the best ways to market genre fiction in a changing marketplace.

His next work, Anthony Boucher: A Biobibliography, won an Anthony Award in 2009 for Best Biographical/Critical work.

He has completed a biography of mystery writer Erle Stanley Gardner, the author who created Perry Mason among other characters and has published a monograph on the pulp fiction works of Gardner, entitled Pulp Icons.

Marks is also a contributing editor to Mystery Scene Magazine and was the director of development for the mystery book publisher Crippen & Landru, taking over the role of publisher in 2018 from Douglas G. Greene.

== Bibliography ==
- ISBN 0-9663397-1-1 "Who Was That Lady? Craig Rice: Queen of the Screwball Mystery"
- ISBN 0-9663397-7-0 "Atomic Renaissance: Women Mystery Writers of the 1940s/1950s'
- ISBN 1-59133-116-1 "Intent to Sell: Marketing the Genre Novel"
- ISBN 978-0-7864-3320-9 "Anthony Boucher: A Biobibliography"

== Awards ==
Year	Title	Award	Result	Ref.
2001	Maganolias and Mayhem	Anthony Award for Best Anthology/Short Story Collection	Finalist	
2002	Who Was That Lady? Craig Rice, Queen of the Screwball Mystery	Edgar Award for Best Critical/Biographical	Finalist	
2002	Who Was That Lady? Craig Rice, Queen of the Screwball Mystery	Agatha Award for Best Nonfiction	Finalist	
2002	Who Was That Lady? Craig Rice, Queen of the Screwball Mystery	Anthony Award for Best Critical Work	Finalist	
2002	Who Was That Lady? Craig Rice, Queen of the Screwball Mystery	Macavity Award for Nonfiction/Critical	Finalist	
2003	Atomic Renaissance: Women Mystery Writers of the 1940s and 1950s	Agatha Award for Best Nonfiction	Finalist	
2003	Intent to Sell: Marketing the Genre Novel	Anthony Award	Finalist	
2003	Intent to Sell: Marketing the Genre Novel	Macavity Award for Nonfiction/Critical	Finalist	
2008	Anthony Boucher: A Biobibliography	Agatha Award for Best Nonfiction	Finalist	
2008	Anthony Boucher: A Biobibliography	Anthony Award	Winner	
