= After I'm Gone =

Book by Laura Lippman

- Author: Laura Lippman
- Genre: Mystery fiction, Thriller
- Published: 2014
- Publisher: William Morrow Publishers
- Pages: 334
- Awards: Anthony Award (2015)
- ISBN: 978-0-062-08339-5

After I'm Gone is a book written by American author Laura Lippman, first published by William Morrow Publishers on February 11, 2014. It won the Anthony Award for Best Novel in 2015.
