= The James Deans =

2005 book by Reed Farrel Coleman

- Author: Reed Farrel Coleman
- Genre: Mystery fiction, Thriller, Crime
- Published: 2005
- Publisher: Plume
- Pages: 288
- Awards: Anthony Award for Best Paperback Original (2006)
- ISBN: 978-0-452-28650-4
- Website: The James Deans

The James Deans is a mystery novel by Reed Farrel Coleman and published by Plume in 2005. It won the Anthony Award for Best Paperback Original in 2006.

The novel follows Moe Prager, a former NYPD cop turned private investigator, as he is forced to uncover the truth regarding the unsolved case of a missing female intern.
