= She Walks These Hills =

1994 book written by Sharyn McCrumb

- First edition
- Author: Sharyn McCrumb
- Genre: Mystery fiction, Historic
- Published: 1994
- Publisher: Scribner
- Pages: 448
- Awards: Anthony Award for Best Novel (1995)
- ISBN: 978-0-451-18472-6
- Website: She Walks These Hills

She Walks These Hills is a 1994 book written by Sharyn McCrumb and published by Charles Scribner's Sons, which later went on to win the Anthony Award for Best Novel in 1995.
