= Jess Lourey =

American author

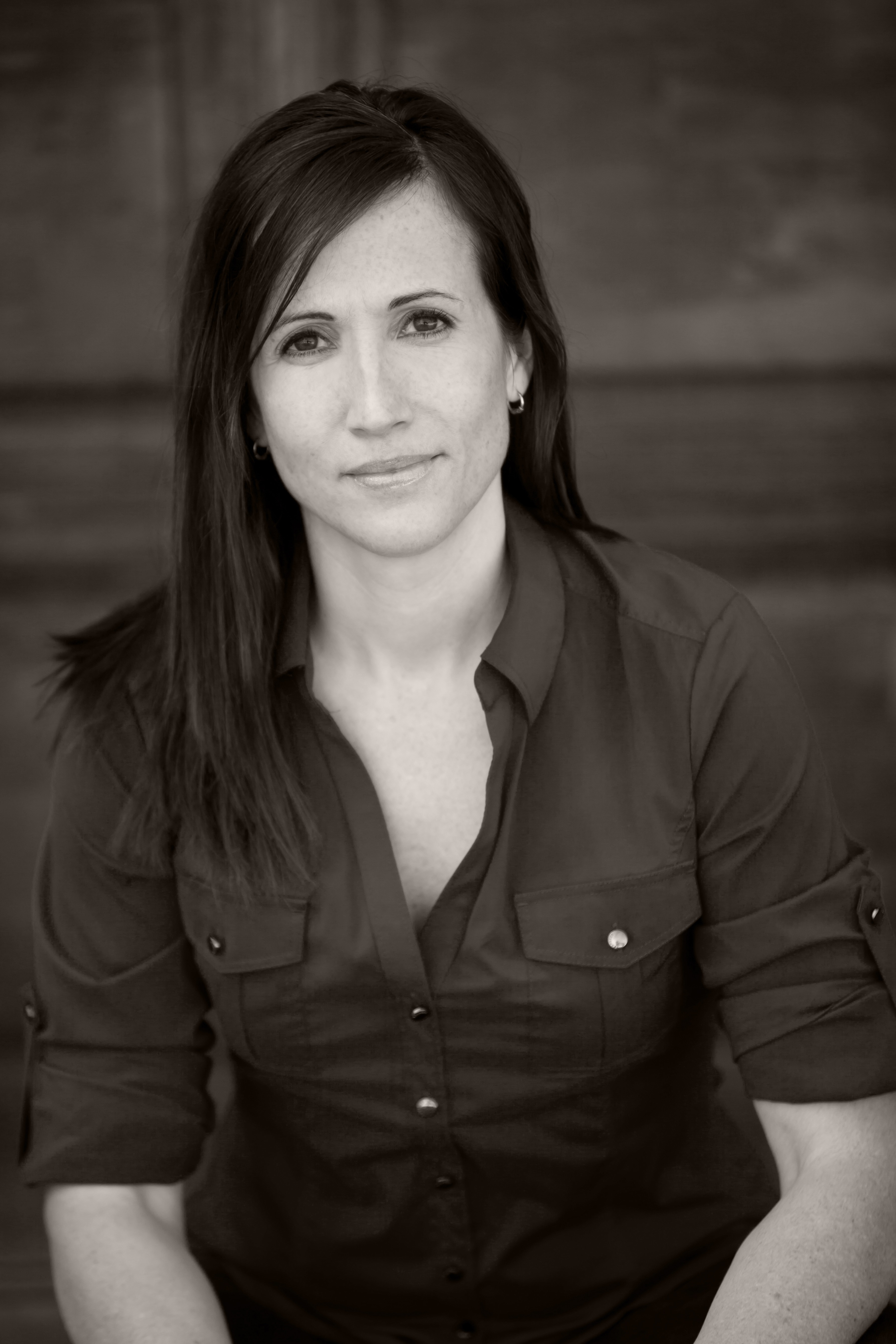
- Born: May 24, 1970 (age 56); Tacoma, Washington, U.S.
- Occupation: Writer

Jessica (Jess) Lourey (born May 24, 1970) is a New York Times bestselling American author of crime, young adult, and magic realism novels, children's books, and nonfiction books.

== Biography ==
Lourey was born in 1970, in Tacoma, Washington and presently lives in Minneapolis, Minnesota. She has two children. Her husband, Jay, died of suicide shortly after their wedding, which prompted her creative writing career.

In August 2016, she presented at the TEDxRapidCity event, where she "explores how everyone, not just authors, can use the power of fiction to transform."

Lourey has received a Master of Arts and Master of Science degree. As of 2021, she taught at St. Cloud Technical and Community College for 11 years in the college's Liberal Arts division. There, she received The Loft’s Excellence in Teaching fellowship. She retired from teaching in August 2021 to pursue writing full-time.

In addition to writing novels, Lourey is a blogger for Psychology Today and hosts writing workshops.

=== Awards and honors ===
Lourey has received a grant from the Lake Region Arts Council.

Year	Title	Award	Result	Ref.
2021	Unspeakable Things	Anthony Award for Best Paperback Original	Winner	
2022	Bloodline	Anthony Award for Best Paperback Original	Winner	
2022	Bloodline	ITW Thriller Award for Paperback Original Novel	Winner	
2023	The Quarry Girls	Minnesota Book Award for Genre Fiction	Winner	
2023	The Quarry Girls	Anthony Award for Best Paperback Original	Winner	

== Publications ==
=== Adult fiction ===
==== Standalone novels ====
- Unspeakable Things (2020)
- Bloodline (2021)
- Litani (2021)
- The Quarry Girls (2022)
- The Crying Killer (2026)

==== Reed and Steinbeck Thrillers ====
- Catch Her in a Lie (2022; ISBN 978-1-662-50767-0)
- The Taken Ones (2023; ISBN 978-1-662-50760-1)
- The Reaping (2024; ISBN 978-1-662-51399-2)
- The Laughing Dead (2025; ISBN 978-1-662-51416-6)

==== The Catalain Book of Secrets series ====
- The Catalain Book of Secrets (2014); republished as The Blackthorn Women (2026)
- Seven Daughters (2014); republished as "Twice in a Blue Moon" (2026)

==== Murder by Month Romcom Mystery series ====
1. May Day (2006)
2. June Bug (2007)
3. Knee High by the Fourth of July (2007)
4. August Moon (2008)
5. September Mourn (2009)
6. October Fest (2011)
7. November Hunt (2012)
8. December Dread (2012)
9. January Thaw (2014)
10. February Fever (2015)
11. March of Crime (2017)
12. April Fools (2019)
13. Monday Is Murder (2022 novella)

==== Salem's Cipher thrillers ====
1. Salem's Cipher (2019)
2. Mercy's Chase (2019)

=== Children's books ===
- Leave My Book Alone! (2021)

=== Short stories ===
- Death by Potato Salad: A Murder-by-the Minute Short Story Featuring Mrs. Berns (2014 Murder by Month Romcom short)
- Give Her a Hand: A Short Story (2014)
- The Adventure of the First Problem (2016 Salem's Cipher short)
- Catch Her in a Lie, part of the Getaway series by multiple authors (2022)

=== Young adult novels ===
- The Toadhouse Trilogy (2012)
- The Verdant Cage (2026)

=== Nonfiction ===
- Rewrite Your Life: Discover Your Truth Through the Healing Power of Fiction (2017)
