= Blood Hollow =

2015 novel by William Kent Krueger

- First edition
- Author: William Kent Krueger
- Genre: Mystery fiction, Thriller
- Published: 2004
- Publisher: Atria Books
- Pages: 512
- Awards: Anthony Award for Best Novel (2005)
- ISBN: 0-7434-4586-4
- Website: Blood Hollow

Blood Hollow is a novel written by American author William Kent Krueger and published by Atria Books in February 2004. It went on to win the Anthony Award for Best Novel in 2005.
