= Jennifer Hillier =

Canadian author

Jennifer Hillier is a Canadian author of Filipino descent. Her 2018 novel Jar of Hearts won the 2019 International Thriller Writers (ITW) Award for Hardcover Novel; in 2023, she won the ITW Award for Best Audiobook for her 2022 novel Things We Do in the Dark.

Hillier was born and raised in Toronto. She lived in Seattle for eight years. She lives in Oakville, Ontario, with her husband and her child.

== Awards ==
Awards for Hillier's writing
Year	Title	Award	Results	Ref.
2019	Jar of Hearts	Anthony Award for Best Novel	Finalist	
2019	Jar of Hearts	International Thriller Writers Award for Hardcover Novel	Winner	
2019	Jar of Hearts	Macavity Award for Best Mystery Novel	Finalist	
2020	Little Secrets	Los Angeles Times Book Prize for Mystery/Thriller	Finalist	
2021	Little Secrets	Anthony Award for Best Novel	Finalist	
2022	Things We Do in the Dark	Goodreads Choice Award for Mystery and Thriller	Nominee	
2022	Things We Do in the Dark	International Thriller Writers Award for Best Novel	Finalist	
2023	Things We Do in the Dark	International Thriller Writers Award for Best Audiobook	Winner	

== Publications ==
=== Creep novels ===
1. Creep. Gallery Books. 2011. ISBN 978-1-4516-2584-4.
2. Freak. Gallery Books. 2012. ISBN 978-1-4516-6454-6.

=== Standalone novels ===
- The Butcher. Gallery Books. 2014. ISBN 978-1-4767-3421-7.
- Wonderland. Gallery Books. 2016. ISBN 978-1-5011-5750-9.
- Jar of Hearts. Minotaur Books. 2018. ISBN 978-1-250-15419-4.
- Little Secrets. Minotaur Books. 2020. ISBN 978-1-250-15422-4.
- Things We Do in the Dark. Minotaur Books. 2022. ISBN 978-1-250-76316-7.
- Heart of Glass. Minotaur Books. 2026. ISBN 978-1-250-76318-1.
