= Somebody Else's Child =

1996 book by Terris McMahan Grimes

- Author: Terris McMahan Grimes
- Genre: Crime, Mystery
- Published: 1996
- Publisher: Onyx
- Pages: 272
- Awards: Anthony Award for Best First Novel (tie) and Anthony Award for Best Paperback Original (1997)
- ISBN: 978-0-451-18672-0

Somebody Else's Child is a book written by Terris McMahan Grimes and published by Onyx on 1 March 1996 which later went on to win the Anthony Award for Best Paperback Original in 1997 and tied for the Best First Novel in the same year.
