= Make Mine a Mystery =

2003 book by Gary Warren Niebuhr

Make Mine a Mystery: A Reader's Guide to Mystery and Detective Fiction
- Author: Gary Warren Niebuhr
- Genre: Thriller
- Published: 2003
- Publisher: Libraries Unlimited
- Pages: 624
- Awards: Anthony Award for Best Critical Nonfiction (2004)
- ISBN: 978-1-563-08784-4
- Website: Make Mine a Mystery

Make Mine a Mystery: A Reader's Guide to Mystery and Detective Fiction is a book written by Gary Warren Niebuhr and published by Libraries Unlimited on 30 April 2003, which later went on to win the Anthony Award for Best Critical Nonfiction in 2004.
