= The Last Detective (book) =

1991 book written by Peter Lovesey

- First edition (UK)
- Author: Peter Lovesey
- Genre: Mystery fiction, Crime
- Published: 1991
- Publisher: Scribners (UK); Soho Crime (US)
- Pages: 336
- Awards: Anthony Award for Best Novel (1992)
- ISBN: 978-1-569-47209-5
- Website: The Last Detective

The Last Detective is a book written by Peter Lovesey and published by Soho Crime in 1991, which later went on to win the Anthony Award for Best Novel in 1992.
