= Death in Little Tokyo =

1996 book written by Dale Furutani

- First edition
- Author: Dale Furutani
- Genre: Mystery fiction
- Published: 1996
- Publisher: St. Martin's Press
- Pages: 224
- Awards: Anthony Award for Best First Novel (1997); Macavity Award for Best First Mystery Novel (1997)
- ISBN: 978-0-312-96323-1
- Website: Death in Little Tokyo

Death in Little Tokyo is a 1996 novel by Dale Furutani, published by St. Martin's Press on October 15, 1996. It later went on to win the Anthony Award for Best First Novel and the Macavity Award for Best First Mystery Novel in 1997.
