= Sean Chercover =

Canadian-American author (b. 1967)

- Born: 1967 (age 58–59)
- Education: Columbia College Chicago (BA, 1991)
- Writing career
- Notable awards: Shamus Award for Best First Novel (2008); Crime Writers' Association Short Story Dagger (2009); Anthony Award for Best Short Story (2009); Dilys Award (2009)

Sean Chercover (born 1967) is a Canadian-American author of mystery novels. His debut novel, Big City, Bad Blood (2007) won the 2008 Shamus Award for Best First Novel, while his sophomore novel, Trigger City (2008), won the 2009 Dilys Award.

== Biography ==
Chercover was born in 1967 to a Canadian father and American mother, granting him dual citizenship in both countries.

He received a Bachelor of Arts from Columbia College Chicago in 1991, after which he became a private investigator, working in Chicago and New Orleans. He has also worked "as a journalist, private investigator in New Orleans, video editor, scuba diver, nightclub magician, encyclopedia salesman, waiter, car-jockey, and truck driver".

Chercover lives in Toronto with his wife and child.

== Awards ==
Awards for Chercover's writing
Year	Title	Awards		Result	Ref.
2008	Big City, Bad Blood	Anthony Awards	First Novel	Finalist	
2008	Big City, Bad Blood	Arthur Ellis Award	First Novel	Finalist	
2008	Big City, Bad Blood	Barry Award	First Novel	Finalist	
2008	Big City, Bad Blood	International Thriller Writers Awards	First Novel	Finalist	
2008	Big City, Bad Blood	Shamus Award	First Novel	Winner	
2009	"One Serving of Bad Luck" in Killer Year	CWA Daggers	Short Story Dagger	Winner	
2009	"A Sleep Not Unlike Death" in Hardcore Hardboiled	Anthony Awards	Short Story	Winner	
2009	"A Sleep Not Unlike Death" in Hardcore Hardboiled	Edgar Awards	Short Story	Finalist	
2009	"A Sleep Not Unlike Death" in Hardcore Hardboiled	Macavity Awards	Short Story	Finalist	
2009	Trigger City	Anthony Awards	Novel	Finalist	
2009	Trigger City	Barry Award	Novel	Finalist	
2009	Trigger City	Crimespree Award for Favorite Book	—	Winner	
2009	Trigger City	Dilys Award	—	Winner	
2009	Trigger City	Macavity Awards	Novel	Finalist	
2013	Trinity Game	Anthony Awards	Novel	Finalist	
2013	Trinity Game	Arthur Ellis Award	Novel	Finalist	
2013	Trinity Game	International Thriller Writers Awards	Novel	Finalist	

== Publications ==
=== Anthology contributions ===
- Child, Lee, ed. (2007). "One Serving of Bad Luck". Killer Year: Stories to Die For... from the Hottest New Crime Writers. Macmillan. ISBN 9780312374709.

=== Daniel Byrne books ===
1. The Trinity Game. Thomas & Mercer. 2012. ISBN 9781612183503.
2. The Devil's Game. Thomas & Mercer. 2015. ISBN 9781503944572.
3. The Savior's Game. Thomas & Mercer. 2017. ISBN 9781477848791.

=== Ray Dudgeon books ===
1. Big City, Bad Blood. William Morrow. 2007. ISBN 9780061128677.
  - One Serving of Bad Luck. StoryFront. 2014. ISBN 9781477877852.
2. Trigger City. William Morrow. 2008. ISBN 9780061128691.

=== Standalone novellas ===
- Maybe Someday. Shift Lock Incorporated. 2012. ISBN 9780987777232.
- A Sleep Not Unlike Death. Shift Lock Incorporated. 2012. ISBN 9780987777218.
- Cussler, Clive, ed. (2014). A Calculated Risk. StoryFront. ISBN 9781477877845.
- The Non Compos Mentis Blues. StoryFront. 2014. ISBN 9781477877869.

=== Short story collections ===
- Eight Lies (About the Truth): A Collection of Short Stories. Shift Lock Incorporated. 2012. ISBN 9780987777201.
