= Allen J. Hubin =

American historian of crime fiction

- Born: March 5, 1936 (age 89); Crosby, Minnesota
- Occupation(s): Literary critic, encyclopedist, anthologist, bibliographer
- Notable work: The Bibliography of Crime Fiction, 1749–1975

Allen J. Hubin (born March 5, 1936, in Crosby, Minnesota) is an American historian of crime fiction, a literary critic and bibliographer of crime fiction.

== Biography ==
Hubin studied at Wheaton College and the University of Minnesota where he graduated in 1961.

A passionate collector of detective literature, Hubin founded the first American magazine devoted to the genre, The Armchair Detective, in 1967. The following year, he succeeded the late Anthony Boucher as author of the column "Criminals at Large", which appeared weekly in The New York Times Book Review. He worked there until 1971 and by 1972 was reviewer for the Star Tribune.

Hubin's personal library of crime novels was of assistance to Ordean Hagen in assembling the first bibliography of English-language crime fiction, Who Done It?, in 1969. Hubin wrote the introduction.

For several years, he collected the best short stories of the year in anthologies published under the title Best Detective Stories of the Year.

His best-known work is the production of The Bibliography of Crime Fiction, 1749–1975, published in 1979 by University Extension, University of California, San Diego in cooperation with Publisher's Inc., Del Mar, California, and revised and re-released as Crime Fiction, 1749–1980: A Comprehensive Bibliography. The bibliography lists all publications in the genre in English. Updates incorporating places, films, screenwriters and directors were made in the 1981–1985 Supplement to Crime Fiction, 1749–1980: A Comprehensive Bibliography and published by Garland in 1988 before Crime Fiction II: A Comprehensive Bibliography, 1749–1990 came out in 1994 in two volumes.

== Bibliography ==
- Best of the Best Detective Stories: 25th Anniversary Collection (1971)
- The Bibliography of Crime Fiction, 1749–1975 (1979)
- The Armchair Detective (1981)
- Crime Fiction, 1749–1980: A Comprehensive Bibliography (1983)
- The Armchair Detective: The First Ten Years (1986)
- 1981–1985 Supplement to Crime Fiction (1988)
- Crime Fiction II: A Comprehensive Bibliography, 1749–1990 (1994)
