= Dale Furutani =

American novelist

- Born: December 1, 1946 (age 79); Hilo, Hawaii
- Education: California State University, Long Beach; University of California, Los Angeles (MBA)
- Occupation: Novelist
- Writing career
- Genre: Mystery
- Website: dalefurutani.com

Dale Furutani (born December 1, 1946, in Hilo, Hawaii) is the first Asian American to win major mystery writing awards. He has won the Anthony Award and the Macavity Award and has been nominated for the Agatha Award. His book, The Toyotomi Blades, was selected as the best mystery of 1997 by the Internet Critics Group. He has been called "the best known of Japanese American writers".

Furutani's family came from Yamaguchi Prefecture in Japan to Hawaii in 1896. He was raised in San Pedro, California, where he attended school. He has a degree in creative writing from California State University, Long Beach, and an MBA in Marketing from UCLA. In addition to his writing career, he has held positions as Parts Marketing Manager for Yamaha Motorcycles, Director of Information Systems for Nissan USA, and CIO of Edmunds.com.

He has written mysteries set in modern Los Angeles and Tokyo as well as a mystery trilogy set in 1603 Japan. He has received a starred review from Publishers Weekly and have been on the Mystery Writers of America national bestseller list, the Los Angeles Times Bestseller List for all fiction, and numerous local mystery bestseller lists. He has been invited to speak at the U. S. Library of Congress several times as both a mystery writer and an Asian American writer. He has also been invited to speak at numerous writer's and mystery conventions.

== Personal life ==
Furutani lives near Seattle, Washington, but spends considerable time in Japan. He has lived in Japan for up to three years at a time.

== Books ==
- Death in Little Tokyo, 1996. ISBN 0312145802
- Toyotomi Blades, 1997. ISBN 0312170505
- Death at the Crossroads, 1998. ISBN 068815817X
- Jade Palace Vendetta, 1999. ISBN 0688158188
- Kill the Shogun, 2000. ISBN 0688158196
- The Curious Adventures of Sherlock Holmes in Japan, 2011. ISBN 146802714X
- The ronin returns. A Matsuyama Kaze mistery, 2021
