= Barbara Seranella =

American author

Barbara Seranella (April 30, 1956 – January 21, 2007) was an American author.

== Early life ==
Seranella was born in Santa Monica, California and then grew up in Pacific Palisades. She left what could have been an idyllic childhood to run away at 13 to seek adventure. She hitchhiked to San Francisco and joined a hippie commune. While there she learned auto mechanics on the street (she liked to hang out with guys who had cars).

Seranella married Walter Haring in spring of 1982. He was the father of Michera Nicole Colella (DOB March 4, 1982). Seranella raised Michera as her own, often picking up the slack where Michera's biological mother's addiction paired with Walt's psychological instability left Seranella to pick up the pieces. Not wanting to create a wedge between two sisters being raised by a single mother with two different fathers, Seranella made the decision to take in Maryann Colella as well and raise her as her own too, just to avoid the confusion of separating the two girls.

In the worst of the girls' mother's addiction, Seranella would come to bring clean pillowcases and basic food supplies even years after her divorce from Michera's biological father.

== Books ==
- No Human Involved (1997)
- No Offense Intended (1999)
- Unwanted Company (2000)
- Unfinished Business (2001)
- No Man Standing (2002)
- Unpaid Dues (2003)
- Unwilling Accomplice (2004)
- An Unacceptable Death (2005)
- Deadman's Switch (2007)

== Death ==
She had homes in La Quinta and Laguna Beach, California. Seranella died January 21, 2007, in Cleveland Clinic in Cleveland, Ohio. She was waiting for a liver transplant to cure her liver disease.
