= Lori Rader-Day =

American writer

- at St Louis County Library Clark Family Branch (photo by Lucas Peterson)
- Website: https://loriraderday.com/

Lori Rader-Day is an American author of mystery, crime, and suspense novels. She has won three Anthony Awards (2015, 2018, 2019), a Simon & Schuster Mary Higgins Clark Award (2016), and an Agatha Award for Best Historical Novel (2021).

== Personal life and education ==
Rader-Day was born in Thorntown, Indiana and currently lives in Chicago.

She received a Bachelor of Science degree from Ball State University, Master of Arts degree in creative nonfiction from Ball State University and a Master of Fine Arts degree in creative writing from Roosevelt University.

== Career ==
From 2019 to 2020, Rader-Day served as the national president for Sisters in Crime. Since 2017, she has served as the co-chair of the Midwest Mystery Conference.

Rader-Day also teaches creative writing for Northwestern University’s School of Professional Studies. She previously taught at Ball State University, Roosevelt University, and Yale University.

== Awards and honors ==
Awards for Rader-Day's writing
Year	Title	Award	Result	Ref.
2015	The Black Hour	Anthony Award for Best First Novel	Winner	
2015	The Black Hour	Left Coast Crime's Rosebud Award	Nominee	
2015	The Black Hour	Simon & Schuster Mary Higgins Clark Award	Nominee	
2015	The Black Hour	Macavity Award for Best First Novel	Nominee	
2015	The Black Hour	Barry Award for Best Paperback Original	Nominee	
2016	Little Pretty Things	Simon & Schuster Mary Higgins Clark Award	Winner	
2016	Little Pretty Things	Anthony Award for Best Paperback Original	Nominee	
2017		The Eugene & Mary Glick Indiana Authors Awards - Regional Author Award	Winner	
2018	The Day I Died	Anthony Award for Best Paperback Original	Winner	
2018	The Day I Died	Barry Award for Best Paperback Original	Nominee	
2018	The Day I Died	ITW Thriller Award for Best Paperback Original	Nominee	
2018	The Day I Died	Simon & Schuster Mary Higgins Clark Award	Nominee	
2019	Under a Dark Sky	Anthony Award for Best Best Paperback Original	Winner	
2019	Under a Dark Sky	Edgar Allan Poe Award for Best Paperback Original	Nominee	
2019	Under a Dark Sky	Lefty Award for Best Mystery	Nominee	
2021	The Lucky One	Agatha Award for Best Contemporary Novel	Nominee	
2021	The Lucky One	Anthony Award for Best Paperback /E-book/ Audiobook Original Novel	Nominee	
2021	The Lucky One	Simon & Schuster Mary Higgins Clark Award	Nominee	
2022	Death at Greenway	Sue Feder Memorial Award (Macavity Award for Best Historical Novel)	Nominee	
2022	Death at Greenway	Bruce Alexander Memorial Award (Lefty Award for Best Historical Novel)	Nominee	
2022	Death at Greenway	Agatha Award for Best Historical Novel	Winner	
2024	The Death of Us	The Eugene & Mary Glick Indiana Authors Award	Nominee	

== Publications ==
- The Black Hour (2014)
- Little Pretty Things (2015)
- The Day I Died (2017)
- Under a Dark Sky (2018)
- The Lucky One (2020)
- Death at Greenway (2021)
- The Death of Us (2023)
- Wreck Your Heart (2026)
