= Mercy Falls (novel) =

2005 novel by William Kent Krueger

- First edition
- Author: William Kent Krueger
- Genre: Mystery fiction, Thriller
- Published: August 2005
- Publisher: Atria Books
- Pages: 434
- Awards: Anthony Award for Best Novel (2006)
- ISBN: 978-0-743-44589-4
- Website: Mercy Falls

Mercy Falls is a book written by William Kent Krueger and published by Atria Books in August 2005, which later went on to win the Anthony Award for Best Novel in 2006.
