= Mystery Readers International =

Mystery Readers International is a fan/reader organization open to all readers, fans, critics, editors, publishers, and writers of Mystery fiction. It was founded by Janet A. Rudolph in Berkeley, California.

It publishes the Mystery Readers Journal quarterly.

It presents the Macavity Awards annually in several categories, including: Best Mystery Novel, Best First Mystery Novel, Best Bio/Critical Mystery Work, Best Mystery Short Story. The Macavity is named for T.S. Eliot's "mystery cat", from his Old Possum's Book of Cats. The first awards were issued in 1987.
