= Edgar Allan Poe Award for Best Young Adult Novel =

Mystery genre writing prize

The Edgar Allan Poe Awards (popularly called the Edgars), named after Edgar Allan Poe, are presented every year by the Mystery Writers of America. They remain the most prestigious awards in the entire mystery genre. The award for Best Young Adult Mystery was established in 1989 as part of the Edgar Awards and recognizes works written for ages twelve to eighteen, and grades eight through twelve. Prior to the establishment of this award, the Mystery Writers of America awarded a special Edgar to Katherine Paterson for The Master Puppeteer in 1977.

== Winners ==
=== 1989-1999 ===
Year	Author	Title	Result	Ref.
1989	Sonia Levitin	Incident at Loring Groves	Winner	
1990	Alane Ferguson	Show Me the Evidence	Winner	
1991	Chap Reaver	Mote	Winner	
1992	Theodore Taylor	The Weirdo	Winner	
1993	Chap Reaver	A Little Bit Dead	Winner	
1994	Joan Lowery Nixon	The Name of the Game Was Murder	Winner	
1995	Nancy Springer	Toughing It	Winner	
1996	Rob MacGregor	Prophecy Rock	Winner	
1997	Willo Davis Roberts	Twisted Summer	Winner	
1998	Will Hobbs	Ghost Canoe	Winner	
1999	Nancy Werlin	The Killer's Cousin	Winner	

=== 2000s ===
Year	Author	Title	Result	Ref.
2000	Vivian Vande Velde	Never Trust a Dead Man	Winner	
2001	Elaine M. Alphin	Counterfeit Son	Winner	
2002	Tim Wynne-Jones	The Boy in the Burning House	Winner	
2003	Daniel Parker	The Wessex Papers	Winner	
2004	Graham McNamee	Acceleration	Winner	
2005	Dorothy Hoobler and Thomas Hoobler	In Darkness, Death	Winner	
2006	John Feinstein	Last Shot	Winner	
2007	Robin Merrow MacCready	Buried	Winner	
2008	Tedd Arnold	Rat Life	Winner	
2009	John Green	Paper Towns	Winner	

=== 2010s ===
Year	Author	Title	Result	Ref.
2010	Peter Abrahams	Reality Check	Winner	
2011	Charlie Price	The Interrogation of Gabriel James	Winner	
2012	Dandi Daley Mackall	The Silence of Murder	Winner	
2012	Harlan Coben	Shelter	Shortlist	
2012	Maureen Johnson	The Name of the Star	Shortlist	
2012	Kathryn Miller Haines	The Girl is Murder	Shortlist	
2012	Todd Strasser	Kill You Last	Shortlist	
2013	Elizabeth Wein	Code Name Verity	Winner	
2014	Annabel Pitcher	Ketchup Clouds	Winner	
2014	Julie Berry	All the Truth That's In Me	Shortlist	
2014	Tom McNeal	Far Far Away	Shortlist	
2014	Terra Elan McVoy	Criminal	Shortlist	
2014	Kirsten Miller	How to Lead a Life of Crime	Shortlist	
2015	James Klise	The Art of Secrets	Winner	
2015	Paolo Bacigalupi	The Doubt Factory	Shortlist	
2015	Elle Cosimano	Nearly Gone	Shortlist	
2015	Lamar Giles	Fake ID	Shortlist	
2015	Blake Nelson	The Prince of Venice Beach	Shortlist	
2016	Mindy McGinnis	A Madness So Discreet	Winner	
2016	Lamar Giles	Endangered	Shortlist	
2016	Melinda Salisbury	The Sin Eater's Daughter	Shortlist	
2016	Nova Ren Suma	The Walls Around Us	Shortlist	
2016	Henry Turner	Ask the Dark	Shortlist	
2017	Monica Hesse	Girl in the Blue Coat	Winner	
2017	Brent Hartinger	Three Truths and a Lie	Shortlist	
2017	April Henry	The Girl I Used to Be	Shortlist	
2017	Justine Larbalestier	My Sister Rosa	Shortlist	
2017	Billy Taylor	Thieving Weasels	Shortlist	
2018	Jason Reynolds	Long Way Down	Winner	
2018	Scott Bergstrom	The Cruelty	Shortlist	
2018	Gillian French	Grit	Shortlist	
2018	Jason Rekulak	The Impossible Fortress	Shortlist	
2018	Angie Thomas	The Hate U Give	Shortlist	
2019	Courtney Summers	Sadie	Winner	
2019	Erin Bowman	Contagion	Shortlist	
2019	Sasha Dawn	Blink	Shortlist	
2019	Will Hill	After the Fire	Shortlist	
2019	Nova Ren Suma	A Room Away From the Wolves	Shortlist	

=== 2020s ===
2020s Best Young Adult winners and shortlists
Year	Author	Title	Result	Ref.
2020	Naomi Kritzer	Catfishing on CatNet	Winner	
2020	Adriana Mather	Killing November	Shortlist	
2020	Randy Ribay	Patron Saints of Nothing	Shortlist	
2020	Kristen Simmons	The Deceivers	Shortlist	
2020	Leah Thomas	Wild and Crooked	Shortlist	
2021	Katie Alender	The Companion	Winner	
2021	Jennifer Lynn Barnes	The Inheritance Games	Shortlist	
2021	Monica Hesse	They Went Left	Shortlist	
2021	June Hur	Silence of Bones	Shortlist	
2021	Karen M. McManus	The Cousins	Shortlist	
2022	Angeline Boulley	Firekeeper's Daughter	Winner	
2022	Faridah Àbíké-Íyímídé	Ace of Spades	Shortlist	
2022	Pamela N. Harris	When You Look Like Us	Shortlist	
2022	June Hur	The Forest of Stolen Girls	Shortlist	
2022	Tess Sharpe	The Girls I've Been	Shortlist	
2023	June Hur	The Red Palace	Winner	
2023	Alexa Donne	Pretty Dead Queens	Shortlist	
2023	Eva V. Gibson	Frightmares	Shortlist	
2023	Juliana Goodman	The Black Girls Left Standing	Shortlist	
2023	Vincent Ralph	Lock the Doors	Shortlist	
2024	April Henry	Girl Forgotten	Winner	
2024	Matthew J. Kirby	Star Splitter	Shortlist	
2024	Cameron Kelly Rosenblum	The Sharp Edge of Silence	Shortlist	
2024	Yvonne Woon	My Flawless Life	Shortlist	
2024	Laura Zimmermann	Just Do This One Thing for Me	Shortlist	
2025	Natalie D. Richards	49 Miles Alone	Winner	
2025	K. A. Cobell	Looking for Smoke	Shortlist	
2025	Alexa Donne	The Bitter End	Shortlist	
2025	June Hur	A Crane Among Wolves	Shortlist	
2025	Maureen Johnson	Death at Morning House	Shortlist	
2026	Libba Bray	Under the Same Stars	Winner	
2026	Ravena Guron	Catch Your Death	Shortlist	
2026	Cindy R. X. He	This is Where We Die	Shortlist	
2026	Tiffany D. Jackson	The Scammer	Shortlist	
2026	Jay Martel	Codebreaker	Shortlist	
