= Bouchercon XLVII =

2016 mystery and detective fiction convention

- "Blood on the Bayou"
- Date: September 15, 2016
- Location: New Orleans, LA
- Country: USA
- Hosted by: Connie Perry and Heather Graham

Bouchercon is an annual convention of creators and devotees of mystery and detective fiction. It is named in honour of writer, reviewer, and editor Anthony Boucher; also the inspiration for the Anthony Awards, which have been issued at the convention since 1986. This page details Bouchercon XLVII and the 2016 Anthony Awards ceremony.

== Bouchercon ==
The convention was held at New Orleans, LA from 15 to 18 September 2016. The event was chaired by Connie Perry and Heather Graham.

=== Special guests ===
- Lifetime Achievement: David Morrell
- American Guests of Honor: Harlan Coben
- Bouchercon Kids Guest of Honor: R. L. Stine
- International Rising Star Guest of Honor: Craig Robertson
- Toastmasters: Harley Jane Kozak and Alexandra Sokoloff
- Local Legend: Julie Smith
- Fan Guests of Honor: Jon and Ruth Jordan
- The David Thompson Memorial Special Service Award: Otto Penzler

== Anthony Awards ==
The following list details the awards distributed at the 2016 annual Anthony Awards ceremony.

=== Best Novel ===
Winner:

- Chris Holm, The Killing Kind

Shortlist:

- Matt Coyle, Night Tremors
- Catriona McPherson, The Child Garden
- Louise Penny, The Nature of the Beast
- Hank Phillippi Ryan, What You See

=== Best First Novel ===
Winner:

- Glen Erik Hamilton, Past Crimes

Shortlist:

- Patricia Abbott, Concrete Angel
- Rob Hart, New Yorked
- Brian Panowich, Bull Mountain
- Art Taylor, On the Road with Del & Louise

=== Best Paperback Original ===
Winner:

- Lou Berney, The Long and Faraway Gone

Shortlist:

- Adrian McKinty, Gun Street Girl
- Lori Rader-Day, Little Pretty Things
- Josh Stallings, Young Americans
- James W. Ziskin, Stone Cold Dead

=== Best Critical Non-fiction Work ===
Winner:

- Val McDermid, Forensics: What Bugs, Burns, Prints, DNA, and More Tell Us About Crime

Shortlist:

- Martin Edwards, The Golden Age of Murder: The Mystery of the Writers Who Invented the Modern Detective Story
- Suzanne Marrs & Tom Nolan, Meanwhile There Are Letters: The Correspondence of Eudora Welty and Ross Macdonald
- Nathan Ward, The Lost Detective: Becoming Dashiell Hammett
- Kate White, The Mystery Writers of America Cookbook: Wickedly Good Meals and Desserts to Die For

=== Best Short Story ===
Winner:

- Megan Abbott, “The Little Men: A Bibliomystery”

Shortlist:

- Hilary Davidson, “The Siege” from Ellery Queen Mystery Magazine, Dec 2015
- Brace Godfrey/Johnny Shaw, “Feliz Navidead” from Thuglit Presents: Cruel Yule
- Erin Mitchell, “Old Hands” from Dark City Lights
- Travis Richardson, “Quack and Dwight” from Jewish Noir
- Holly West, “Don't Fear the Ripper” from Protectors 2: Heroes

=== Best Anthology or Collection ===
Winner:

- Art Taylor, Murder Under the Oaks: Bouchercon Anthology 2015

Shortlist:

- Christopher Irvin, Safe Inside the Violence
- Thomas Pluck, Protectors 2: Heroes-Stories to Benefit PROTECT
- Todd Robinson, Thuglit Presents: Cruel Yule: Holiday Tales of Crime for People on the Naughty List
- Kenneth Wishnia, Jewish Noir: Contemporary Tales of Crime and Other Dark Deeds

=== Best Young Adult Novel ===
Winner:

- Joelle Charbonneau, Need

Shortlist:

- Owen Matthews, How to Win at High School
- Mindy McGinnis, A Madness So Discreet
- Melinda Salisbury, The Sin Eater’s Daughter
- B.K. Stevens, Fighting Chance
- Henry Turner, Ask the Dark

=== Best Crime Fiction Audio-book ===
Winner:

- Robert Bathurst (narrator), The Nature of the Beast by Louise Penny

Shortlist:

- Assaf Cohen (narrator), Dark Waters by Chris Goff
- Clare Corbett, Louise Brealey & India Fisher (narrators), The Girl on the Train by Paula Hawkins
- Christina Cox (narrator), Causing Chaos by Deborah J. Ledford
- Em Eldridge (narrator), Young Americans by Josh Stallings
