= Capstick =

Capstick may refer to:

- Capstick (surname)
- .470 Capstick, a rifle cartridge
- Capstick, Nova Scotia, a community in Nova Scotia, Canada
