= Alphin =

Alphin is a surname. Notable people with the surname include:

- Arthur Alphin (born 1948), United States Army officer and military historian
- Elaine M. Alphin (1955–2014), American writer
- Gerald Alphin (born 1964), American football player
- Nick Alphin, American sound engineer
