= Copestake =

Copestake is an English surname. Notable people with the surname include:

- Ann Copestake, British computational linguist
- Joe Copestake (1859–?), English footballer
- Levi Copestake (1886–1968), English footballer
- Oliver Copestake (1921–1953), English footballer

== See also ==
- Capstick (surname)
- Copestake Peak, a mountain of South Georgia
