= This Is Not a Test =

This Is Not a Test may refer to:

- This Is Not a Test (1962 film), a nuclear-war film directed by Fredric Gadette
- This Is Not a Test (2008 film), a comedy/drama film starring Hill Harper
- This Is Not a Test (2025 film), a zombie horror film
- This Is Not a Test!, a 2003 album by Missy Elliott
- This Is Not a Test (album), a 2015 album by tobyMac
- "This is Not a Test" (Kyle XY), a season-one episode of science-fiction television series Kyle XY
- "This Is Not a Test", a song by Bikini Kill from their 1991 album Revolution Girl Style Now!
- "This Is Not a Test", a song by Zooey Deschanel from the She & Him album Volume One
- This Is Not a Test (novel), 2012 novel by Courtney Summers
