= Kelly Jensen =

American writer, editor, and activist

- Education: University of Texas at Austin
- Occupations: Writer, editor, and activist
- Employer: Book Riot
- Website: kellybjensen.com

Kelly Jensen is an American writer, editor, and activist. She has been an editor at the literary website Book Riot since 2013, where she writes about books, book bans, and censorship. She has edited three anthologies on topics including feminism, mental health, and the human body.

== Education ==
Jensen earned an undergraduate degree in English, Psychology, and Writing from Cornell College in 2007. As an undergraduate, she interned at the college library, where she worked on a project about book bans. She earned her Master of Science in Information Systems from University of Texas at Austin in 2008.

== Career ==
Jensen started her career working as a teen, youth, and adult librarian in public libraries in northern Illinois and southern Wisconsin. While working as a librarian in 2009, she and a graduate school classmate began a book blog called Stacked. She later began writing a newsletter called Well Sourced.

=== Book Riot ===
Jensen joined the literary website Book Riot in 2013. In 2015, after Courtney Summers' young adult fiction novel Some Girls Are was challenged by a parent at West Ashley High School in Charleston, South Carolina, Jensen worked with a local public librarian, Andria Amaral, to organize donations of copies of the books to ensure access to any student who wished to read it. They ultimately collected more than 1,000 copies of the book. That year, Jensen and Amaral were named "Free Speech Heroes" by the National Coalition Against Censorship.

In July 2021, Jensen began writing a regular "Censorship News" column for Book Riot, tracking the increase in book banning in the United States. Publishers Weekly described her as "one of the most important voices chronicling [the] movement to ban books, her column effectively creating a historical record as it unfolds". She has also worked with Chicago libraries to train staff on how to respond to book bans.

Publishers Weekly named Jensen in their "People of the Year" list in 2022 for her anti-censorship work. In August 2023, the American Association of School Librarians formally commended Jensen's censorship column in Book Riot. Library Journal listed Jensen on their 2024 "Movers & Shakers" list in the "Ban Battlers" category.

=== Anthologies ===
In 2017, Jensen compiled an intersectional feminist anthology for young adults titled Here We Are, featuring writing from Michaela DePrince, Amandla Stenberg, Nova Ren Suma, Roxane Gay, and 40 others. Teen Vogue wrote, "Here We Are not only presents an inclusive and hopeful vision for the future of feminism, it also boldly and proudly passes the torch to the next generation of leaders."

In 2018, Jensen published (Don't) Call Me Crazy, an anthology of writing about mental health. The anthology was included in The Washington Post's "Best Children's Books of 2018" list, and was named an Honor Book by the Schneider Family Book Award.

Jensen's 2020 anthology, Body Talk, discusses body-related topics including sexuality, gender identity, disability, and weight. The book was banned in school districts in several states, including Tennessee, Missouri, New Hampshire, and Florida.

== Personal life ==
Jensen lives in Woodstock, Illinois.

== Works ==
=== Books ===
- It Happens: A Guide to Contemporary Realistic Fiction for the YA Reader (2014)

=== Anthologies ===
- Here We Are: 44 Voices Write, Draw and Speak About Feminism for the Real World (2017)
- (Don't) Call Me Crazy: 33 Voices Explore Our Radical Anatomy (2018)
- Body Talk: 37 Voices Explore Our Radical Anatomy (2020)
