= Holland Hall (Tulsa, Oklahoma) =

Private school in Tulsa, Oklahoma, US

Location
- 5666 East 81st Street; Tulsa, Oklahoma 74137; United States; 36°02′38″N 95°54′52″W

Information
- School type: Private PreK-12
- Motto: Honor Loyalty Courtesy
- Religious affiliation: Episcopal
- Established: 1922; 104 years ago
- Founder: James Alexander Veasey
- Head of school: J.P. Culley
- Gender: Coeducational
  - Grade 12: 86
- Student to teacher ratio: 10:1
- Campus size: 162 acres
- Colors: Red, Black and White
- Athletics conference: Oklahoma Secondary School Activities Association (OSSAA)
- Mascot: Dutch the Lion
- Nickname: Dutch
- Team name: Dutch
- Rival: Cascia Hall Preparatory School
- Accreditation: Independent Schools Association of the Southwest (ISAS)

Holland Hall (or Holland Hall School), in Tulsa, Oklahoma, United States, is affiliated with the Episcopal Diocese of Oklahoma and the Episcopal Church. The school has an approximate student-to-faculty ratio of 10:1, and approximately 1,000 students. (1,034 in 2021).

== History ==
Founded in 1922 by James Alexander Veasey, a University of Michigan graduate and lawyer formerly employed by the Dawes Commission, the school is named to honor the first headmistress, Winnifred Shureman, who was of Dutch descent. The school opened its first classes on September 21, 1922.

=== The first home ===
Holland Hall first moved into a new building in 1923, just south of downtown Tulsa, at 1850 South Boulder. Financing was arranged by a group of prominent Tulsa businessmen, including Waite Phillips and William Skelly. The building contained only nine classrooms. The school outgrew this facility by 1932, when it moved to a new location. (Note: The building was later occupied for a number of years by radio station KTUL. It still stands near Boulder Park and has been listed on the National Register of Historic Places.) By 1930, the school had 60 students and 8 teachers.

=== Present home ===
The campus is 162 acres (0.66 km^{2}) in the southern part of Tulsa. The move to 81st Street began with the Upper Division in 1970. The Primary Division moved in 1976, and the Middle School made the transition in 1982. The 81st Street facility has since added the Walter Arts Center (1992), the Outdoor Sports Complex, including the Charles H. Brown Football Field (1995), the Duenner Family Science, Math, and Technology Center (2000), and Mary K. Chapman Primary School (2009). The football field was renamed Hardesty Field in 2012, when the facade was remodeled and artificial turf was installed. Each of the three divisions has its own library. In 2018, the A.R. and Marylouise Tandy Dining and Wellness Center was completed, creating a state-of-the-art workout facility for various sports, and bringing Middle School and Upper School dining operations under one roof.

Although the school was intended to be coeducational from the time of its founding, within a few years it became girls-only at the Upper Level (high school age). In 1959, the school became affiliated with the Episcopal church. In the same year, it started a major campaign to attract boys to the upper classes. This included starting an energetic athletic program for boys.

The school enrolls approximately 1,000 students each year.

The school's "4 A’s" philosophy values academics, athletics, arts, and atmosphere.

Graduation requirements include English, 4 credits; Foreign Language, 3 credits; Mathematics, 3 credits; Science, 3 credits; Social Studies, 3 credits; Religious Studies, .5 credit; Fine Arts, 1 credit; Athletics, 3.5 credits; Additional non-departmental requirements include: Wellness (Ninth and Twelfth grades) - one semester class dealing with social and emotional health; Junior Seminar - one semester class dealing with college selection and application process; A 40-hour senior internship/shadowing experience; A minimum of 21 credits is necessary for graduation.

Holland Hall offers multiple foreign language possibilities. Beginning in primary school, students learn Spanish. In sixth grade, students take a language of their choice, either French, Chinese, or Spanish. Latin in the middle school was removed after the 2017–2018 school year. Students who need extra enrichment take LAS, Language Arts Strategies, to help with study skills in place of one year of language in middle school. In upper school, students choose between French, Spanish, Latin, and Chinese. Exchange trips and class trips are offered.

Holland Hall is accredited by the Independent Schools Association of the Southwest (ISAS), is recognized by the Oklahoma State Regents for Higher Education, is a member of the National Association of Independent Schools, the National Association of Episcopal Schools, National Association for College Admission Counselors, the Great Plains Association for College Admission Counseling, the College Board, the Education Conservancy and, since 1968, the Cum Laude Society.

Holland Hall has been recognized by the Oklahoma State Regents for Higher Education for superior college preparation.

Holland Hall is one of only three Oklahoma educational institutions to belong to the Center for Academic Integrity. Holland Hall is one of four independent schools to participate in the College Work Readiness Assessment (CWRA) project. The scores of Seniors in the Class of 2007 were comparable to the top 25% of college freshmen who took the exam at the end of their first year of college.

Middle and Upper school schedules are based on a six-day cycle: A through F. Each day is divided into eighteen twenty-two-minute mods, unless on Wednesday, when school starts an hour later, when it is 18 minute mods. Classes are generally two or three mods long. Each class meets a set number of days per cycle. Freshman Wellness (Upper School), for example, meets two days per cycle, while an English class would meet five of the six. Most of the primary classes (English, math, science, history, foreign language) meet five times per cycle.

== Arts ==
The Walter Arts Center (WAC) at Holland Hall School is a multi-venue facility used by both the school and the community at large. The Branch Theatre is named in honor of a former headmaster and has a proscenium-thrust stage with seating for over 1200, and a full suspended fly-gallery. The WAC is home to a large studio theater (the Newman "Black Box"), an art gallery, a black-and-white photo lab, a digital imaging studio, a ceramics workshop, a dance studio, an orchestra/band rehearsal hall, a choir room, and a painting studio.

Arts are emphasized from an early age at Holland Hall, where children in grade school engage in performance based activities. Beginning in the Middle School, students audition for the annual Middle School student/faculty production. While such productions have traditionally consisted of musicals, recent selections have included Shakespeare and other dramas.

In the Upper School, students participate in arts programs to satisfy graduation requirements, though many choose to continue their involvement in the arts long after this has been fulfilled. Disciplines include orchestra, choir, jazz band, modern dance, and visual arts.

== Athletics ==
Holland Hall School belongs to the Independent Schools Association of the Southwest and the National Association of Independent Schools. As of April 15, 2015, the school received provisional membership in the Oklahoma Secondary School Activities Association (OSSAA). The athletic teams, known as "The Dutch", have competed in the Southwest Preparatory Conference (SPC) in 12 sports since the SPC was founded in 1967. Beginning in 2016–17, most teams (except field hockey) began competing in the Oklahoma Secondary School Activities Association. Beginning in grade seven, students have a sports requirement rather than a physical education requirement. The Athletic Director of the school is Steve Heldebrand, who came to the school in 2006.

=== Soccer ===
The boys' soccer team won the 2008 SPC Championship with a 5–3 win over St. Mark's School of Texas. The girls were 2nd place in Division II. The boys' soccer team also won the 2009 SPC Championship with a 2–0 win over John Cooper School. They finished the season 21-0-1 and were ranked #8 in the nation in the ESPN RISE national winter soccer rankings; ESPN RISE also named coach Richard Hart as to its first team All-America squad.

The boys' soccer team also won the 2011 SPC Championship in a penalty shootout against St. Mark's. They finished the season 18-0-1.

=== Football ===
Beginning with the 2016/2017 school year, The Dutch transitioned to the OSSAA at the 2A divisional level. The team has found success in 2A, having qualified for the divisional playoffs every year. The 2017 team completed a 12–1 season, losing in the quarterfinal playoff round to Davis, 28–27, in overtime. The 2018 team finished with a 9–3 record, losing to Washington in the divisional playoff. The Dutch have won the 3A state championship in 2020 and 2021.

Prior to entry in the OSSAA in 2016, Holland Hall played in five SPC Division I Championship games, including winning the 2005 championship 24–10 over St. Marks School of Texas. This was the conclusion of a 10–0 season, including regular season victories over Cascia Hall and Casady. Their rival in the Southwest Preparatory Conference was the St. Mark's School of Texas Lions, which had beaten Holland Hall to win the SPC Division I football championship several times.

=== Golf ===
The boys' golf team won three consecutive championships in 2003, 2004, and 2005. The girls' team won their first title in 2005.

== Notable alumni ==
- Leslie Berlin, author of The Man Behind the Microchip: Robert Noyce and the Invention of Silicon Valley
- Max Burnett, TV and film writer/producer
- Heather Langenkamp, actress
- Tim Blake Nelson, actor
- Meaghan Oppenheimer, screenwriter
- Andy Skib, musician
- Steve Sparks, Major League Baseball pitcher
- Neal Tiemann, musician
- Micah Fitzerman-Blue, screenwriter
- Jennifer Lynn Barnes, author of The Inheritance Games
