= Corteon Moore =

Canadian actor

- Born: 1998 or 1999 (age 27–28); Winnipeg, Manitoba, Canada
- Education: Wexford Collegiate School for the Arts
- Occupation: Actor
- Years active: 2017–present
- Television: FROM

Corteon Moore (born 1998 or 1999) is a Canadian actor, known for his roles in the horror series From (2022–present) and the zombie film This Is Not a Test (2025).

== Early life and education ==
Born in Winnipeg, Moore grew up in Toronto, where he attended the Wexford Collegiate School for the Arts and the LB Acting Studio. In Toronto, Moore founded a movie festival at the Paradise Theatre with the aim of promoting the works of young and developing filmmakers. The opening event took place on February 11, 2023, with the screening of the 2002 crime film City of God, which Moore chose to show how the film characters face adversity in a place designed against them.

== Career ==
After turning 18, Moore moved out of his parents' home and lived alone in an apartment in Toronto's West End. He worked as a bartender and took interest in the Black power movement and Black pride. He later moved to the United States, settling in Greenpoint, Brooklyn, in New York City. Moore joined the cast of From in 2022 and, in 2025, he took over two prominent roles in his career: the American comedy television series Overcompensating written by Benito Skinner, and the zombie horror film This Is Not a Test, an adaptation from a 2012 novel by Canadian writer Courtney Summers, where he starred as a main role character along with actors Olivia Holt, Froy Gutierrez, Carson MacCormac, and Luke Macfarlane.

== Personal life ==
An avid amateur cyclist, Moore splits his time between New York and his native Canada.

== Filmography ==
=== Film ===
Year	Work	Role	Ref.
2020	Two Deaths of Henry Baker	Brumby	
2022	Terror Train	Mo	
2024	Guess Who	Michael Gosse	
2025	Abraham's Boys	Eddie	
2025	This Is Not a Test	Cary	
2026	The God of Frogs	Brendan	

=== Television ===
Year	Work	Role	Ref.
2017	Backstage	Matteo	
2018	Impulse	Marcus Kennedy	
2019	Creeped Out	Older Carlos	
2019	The Ninth	Chester "Chip" Hudson	
2020	Utopia Falls	Kris 12	
2021	Slasher	Jayden	
2021	Private Eyes	Lachlan	
2022–present	From	Ellis	
2025	Overcompensating	Gabe	

=== Web series ===
Year	Work	Role	Ref.
2017	Spiral	Davis	
