= Raised by Wolves =

Raised by Wolves may refer to:

== Books ==
- Raised by Wolves (book series), a young adult fantasy novel series by Jennifer Lynn Barnes

== Podcasts ==
- Were You Raised By Wolves?, a weekly podcast about etiquette and manners

== Music ==
- "Raised by Wolves" (song), a song by Falling in Reverse
- Raised by Wolves (EP), a 2005 EP by Voxtrot
- Raised by Wolves, a 2005 album by Fitzgerald
- "Raised by Wolves", a song by U2 on their 2014 album Songs of Innocence

== Television ==
- Raised by Wolves (British TV series), a 2013 British television series written by Caitlin Moran
- Raised by Wolves (American TV series), a 2020 American scifi drama television series
  - "Raised by Wolves" (episode), the first episode of the first season of Raised by Wolves

== See also ==
- Feral child, a human child who has grown up isolated from human contact, sometimes with wolves
- Romulus and Remus, the origin myth of the city of Rome depicting twin brothers raised by wolves
- The Jungle Book, a collection of stories about a boy raised by wolves in the Indian jungle
