= EveryLibrary =

American library advocacy non-profit

- Founded: 2012
- Type: 501(c)(4)
- Tax ID no.: 46-1534149
- Purpose: Library advocacy
- Headquarters: Riverside, Illinois
- Region served: United States
- Key people: John Chrastka (founder and executive director)
- Revenue: $403,951 (2022)
- Website: www.everylibrary.org

EveryLibrary is an American non-profit advocacy organization supporting public and school libraries and librarians.

EveryLibrary consists of the EveryLibrary 501(c)(4) organization and its companion organization, the EveryLibrary Institute 501(c)(3) organization.

== History ==
EveryLibrary was founded by John Chrastka in 2012, and he remains the organization's executive director. The group is the only political action committee focused on supporting libraries. Operating nationally, EveryLibrary is based in Riverside, Illinois.

EveryLibrary has focused their advocacy on topics including supporting funding for school librarians, and opposing book bans and censorship. The group maintains lists of "Legislation of Concern", where they identify state legislation that they believe would be harmful to libraries and librarians, or the freedom to read and access information.

In 2023, the EveryLibrary Institute and Book Riot issued a survey, and subsequent EveryLibrary Institute-authored report, to understand parents' opinions on book bans and the trustworthiness of libraries.

In 2023, EveryLibrary and the EveryLibrary Institute launched Fight for the First, which provides resources for communities to act in defense of their first amendment rights.

In 2025, EveryLibrary, in collaboration with other advocacy groups, fought against library censorship in Alabama, Colorado, Connecticut, Delaware, and Rhode Island, as well as Trump administration censorship of the Smithsonian.

== See also ==
- Book banning in the United States (2021–present)
- Public library advocacy
