= The Red Palace =

2022 novel by June Hur

- Author: June Hur
- Genre: Historical mystery
- Publisher: Feiwel & Friends
- Publication date: 2022
- ISBN: 978-1250800558

The Red Palace (Korean: 붉은 궁전) is a historical mystery novel published in 2022 by June Hur.

It won the 2023 Edgar Allan Poe Award for Best Young Adult Novel.

== Plot ==
The novel is set in 1758 Joseon during the reign of King Yeongjo, a period characterized by political instability and tension between the King and Crown Prince Sado. Baek-hyun, an illegitimate daughter of a high-ranking official, works diligently as a palace nurse (uinyeo) to earn respect and escape her low societal status.

The main conflict begins when four women, including commoners and students at Hyeminseo (the public clinic), are brutally murdered in a single night. Rumors quickly spread that Crown Prince Sado is the killer, as he secretly left the palace without permission on the night of the incident. To protect the Prince, palace officials try to cover up his absence, but suspicion deepens when Hyun's beloved mentor, Uinyeo In-young, is arrested and framed for the murders.

Determined to clear her mentor's name and discover the truth, Hyun launches her own investigation. She forms an alliance with Seo Eor-jin, a brilliant and righteous young police inspector (jongsa-gwan) who is also investigating the case. As they search for clues, Hyun and Eor-jin uncover a web of political corruption, royal secrets, and dangerous power struggles between the political factions of the court.

As Hyun digs deeper, she discovers a mirroring connection between her own life and that of Crown Prince Sado, as both suffer from a lack of validation from their strict, emotionally distant fathers. In the climax, the true killer is revealed to be Hyun's colleague, In-young, who committed the murders as a form of personal, vigilante revenge for her parents' past wrongful deaths. In-young justifies her crimes as righteous retribution, forcing Hyun to confront the boundaries of justice and morality. With the conspiracy exposed, Sado's name is cleared of the specific crime, and Hyun successfully protects those she cares about while finding her own worth.
