= Every Other Day =

2011 young adult novel by Jennifer Lynn Barnes

- Cover of Every Body Looking
- Author: Jennifer Lynn Barnes
- Language: English
- Publisher: Egmont Books
- Publication date: December 27, 2011
- Media type: Print (hardcover, paperback)

Every Other Day is a young adult novel by Jennifer Lynn Barnes, published December 27, 2011 by Egmont Books.

== Reception ==
Every Other Day was generally well-received by critics.

Kirkus Reviews noted that the "story adopts a fairly standard mad-scientist premise but ends up coming across just as much a paranormal adventure" and concluded the book included "[s]ome good thrills" because "the main focus remains on suspense, well delivered."

Publishers Weekly noted that the book "balances confident world-building, action, and strong character development." Further, they appreciated that "all of the conflicts come to a head in an extended but gripping climax," saying, "Fans of adult-oriented urban fantasy should enjoy this as much as teens looking for a contemporary Buffy."

The Young Adult Library Services Association selected the book for its annual list of Best Fiction for Young Adults in 2013. It also received the Romantic Times Reviewers' Choice Award for Best Young Adult Urban Fantasy/Paranormal in 2012.
