= Peter Hathaway Capstick =

American hunter and author

- Born: Peter Hathaway Capstick; January 11, 1940; New Jersey, United States
- Died: March 13, 1996 (aged 56); Pretoria, South Africa
- Occupations: Professional hunter, writer
- Spouse: Fiona Claire Capstick

Peter Hathaway Capstick (1940–1996) was an American hunter and author. He was born in New Jersey and educated at the University of Virginia although he was not a graduate. Capstick walked away from a successful Wall Street career shortly before his thirtieth birthday to become a professional hunter. His hunting career began in Central and South America and culminated with hunts in Africa for which he is best known. Capstick spent much of his life in Africa, a land he called his "source of inspiration". A chain smoker and heavy drinker, he died at age 56 from complications following heart surgery.

== Biography ==
After a short career as a Wall Street stockbroker, Capstick headed to Latin America, where he traveled widely while hunting, fishing, and mastering the Spanish language. A few years later he returned to New York, where he founded a business arranging professionally guided hunting trips. Shortly thereafter, he took a position as Hunting and Fishing Director at Winchester Adventures of New York, a subsidiary of the famous gun manufacturer. In that capacity, he made his first trip to Africa in 1968. Subsequently, he worked as a professional hunter and game ranger in Zambia, Botswana, and Rhodesia.

Capstick started writing about his adventures in the late 1960s and published numerous articles in various sporting magazines. In 1977, he published his first book, Death in the Long Grass, which became a commercial success and established his reputation as an author of true adventure stories. Capstick is frequently compared to Ernest Hemingway and Robert Ruark in discussions of influential African hunting authors.

== Death ==
In early 1996, Capstick was a keynote speaker at the annual Safari Club International convention in Reno, Nevada, when he collapsed in his hotel room and was diagnosed with exhaustion. He was immediately flown back to his adopted country of South Africa and underwent heart bypass surgery in a Pretoria hospital. He died just before midnight on March 13 of complications from surgery.

After a small private ceremony, his ashes were scattered over the Chobe River in northeastern Botswana.

== Legacy ==
The .470 Capstick rifle cartridge, developed by A-Square's Colonel Arthur B. Alphin in 1990, bears his name. Additionally, his legacy is saluted by The Dallas Safari Club's annual Peter Hathaway Capstick Hunting Heritage Award for the promotion of responsible hunting and wildlife conservation.

== Bibliography ==
- A Man Called Lion
- The African Adventurers: A Return To Silent Places
- Death in a Lonely Land
- Death in the Dark Continent
- Death in the Long Grass
- Death in the Silent Places
- The Last Ivory Hunter
- Last Horizons
- Maneaters
- Peter Capstick's Africa: A Return To The Long Grass
- Sands of Silence
- Safari: the Last Adventure
- Warrior: the Legend of Colonel Richard Meinertzhagen

== Filmography ==
Capstick published a series of hunting videos over the years.

- Capstick - Botswana Safari
- Capstick - Hunting the White Rhino
- Capstick - Hunting the African Elephant
- Capstick - Hunting the African Lion
- Capstick - Hunting the Cape Buffalo
- Capstick's Last Safari

== See also ==
- List of famous big game hunters
