= .470 Capstick =

Rifle cartridge

- Type: Rifle
- Place of origin: United States

Production history
- Designer: LTC. Arthur B. Alphin
- Designed: 1990
- Manufacturer: A-Square

Specifications
- Parent case: .375 H&H Magnum
- Case type: Belted, straight
- Bullet diameter: .475 in (12.1 mm)
- Neck diameter: .499 in (12.7 mm)
- Base diameter: .513 in (13.0 mm)
- Rim diameter: .532 in (13.5 mm)
- Case length: 2.85 in (72 mm)
- Overall length: 3.65 in (93 mm)
- Rifling twist: 10
- Primer type: Large rifle

Ballistic performance
Bullet mass/type	Velocity	Energy
500 gr (32 g) Solid	2,400 ft/s (730 m/s)	6,394 ft⋅lbf (8,669 J)
500 gr (32 g) Woodleigh Soft	2,376 ft/s (724 m/s)	6,266 ft⋅lbf (8,496 J)
500 gr (32 g) GS Custom Flat Nose Solid	2,342 ft/s (714 m/s)	6,088 ft⋅lbf (8,254 J)
500 gr (32 g) Cast Lead	1,130 ft/s (340 m/s)	1,417 ft⋅lbf (1,921 J)
400 gr (26 g) Speer Flat	2,484 ft/s (757 m/s)	5,479 ft⋅lbf (7,429 J)
- Test barrel length: 26 in Source: Cartridges of the World

The .470 Capstick is a rifle cartridge created by Col. Arthur B Alphin from A-Square in 1990, named after writer and hunter Peter Hathaway Capstick. It is based on a .375 H&H Magnum case blown out and necked to accept a .475 inch (12 mm) bullet. With 500 grain (32 g) bullets, it can achieve 2400 feet per second (730 m/s) muzzle velocity from a 26" barrel.

== Overview ==
Although it is not very flat shooting because of slow velocities, it is flat enough for use out to 250 yards (230 m). It transmits an extreme amount of power at over 6,000 ft·lbf (8,000 J) and is designed for use on dangerous game out to 200 yards (180 m). Like other large cartridges, the high energy performance is accompanied by a large amount of recoil.

The Capstick is very similar in dimension to the .470 Ackley, but where the Ackley uses a 600-grain (39 g) bullet, the Capstick uses a lighter 500-grain (32 g) bullet for a better trajectory.

== The cartridge ==
The .470 Capstick is a belted magnum with the same rim and belt size as a .375 H&H. The case has a length of 2.800 inches (71.1 mm), and the overall cartridge length is 3.65 inches (93 mm). A cartridge drawing is shown below for dimensions.

The .470 Capstick will fit in the same length action as the .375 H&H Magnum and .458 Lott. Actually the .458 Lott is a good measuring stick for the .470 Capstick. The Capstick has a bullet that has 7% more cross sectional area than the .458 Lott, which, in theory, would result in more shock transfer to game and a larger wound channel.. As for powder capacity and velocity, they are similar, with the .470 Capstick having a slight edge in powder capacity and therefore a slight edge in theoretical velocity. However, for field use the .470 Capstick and .458 Lott should have identical performance because the differences between them are rather small.

That being said, the differences in field results between the .458 Winchester Magnum and the .470 Nitro Express should be nonexistent, because both push a 500-grain (32 g) bullet at 2,150 ft/s (660 m/s) But some people have noted an observable difference in the way shot game behaves with those two cartridges, possibly due to the greater cross sectional area of the .474-inch (12.0 mm) bullet. If desired, the .470 Capstick can be used to create a ballistic twin to the .470 Nitro Express, pushing a 500-grain (32 g) bullet at 2,150 ft/s (660 m/s) while generating low pressure.

For those who remember the .475 Ackley, it is similar to the .470 Capstick, except that the Capstick has a ghost shoulder which allows the cartridge to achieve excellent accuracy. Use of a ghost shoulder, rather than a continuous taper on the case wall, helps the cartridge to line up concentrically with the bore axis, contributing to accuracy.

Although it is possible to use 600-grain (39 g) bullets in the .470 Capstick cartridge, the powder capacity is not sufficient to push 600 grains (39 g) at anything near 2,300 ft/s (700 m/s) without high pressure, so this is not the best bullet weight for the Capstick. 500-grain (32 g) bullets seem to be the best all-around compromise. With full power loads, recoil is significant but not difficult to control or become accustomed to. Recoil from the cast lead bullet load shown below is almost nonexistent. For plinking or light game hunting, 400-grain (26 g) pistol bullets are a candidate, but they generate almost as much recoil as 500-grain (32 g) bullets. The advantage of 400-grain (26 g) bullets is that they are inexpensive and will open up quickly on light game. In my rifle they also tend to hit at least 6 inches (150 mm) higher than the 500-grain (32 g) bullets, creating an inconvenience for the hunter who wishes to use both bullets on the same hunting excursion.

== The rifles ==
Currently factory rifles in .470 Capstick are available from A-Square, from the Winchester Custom Shop and from Fuchs Fine Guns. However, that short list should not disappoint the reader because there are many options for building a nice custom rifle in .470 Capstick. Any action that can handle the .375 H&H Magnum is a suitable candidate.

The easiest conversion is a CZ550 that came from the factory in .375 H&H Magnum, .458 Winchester Magnum or .458 Lott. All that has to be done is to replace the barrel with another in .470 Capstick. Barrels are available from Lothar-Walther and Pac-Nor. A 2nd recoil lug must be added to the underside of the barrel and inletted into the forearm of the stock. The 2nd recoil lug will spread recoil that the stock is exposed to, across a wider surface area to avoid splitting the stock. Glass or steel bedding is recommended. Some minor polishing or adjusting of the ramp and rails may be needed, and then the rifle is ready to shoot. The advantage of the CZ550 conversion is that they typically hold 5 rounds in the magazine box plus one in the chamber, and very little work is usually needed to get them to feed.

A Winchester Model 70 Classic (claw extractor) can also easily be converted to .470 Capstick. In addition to the steps above, the magazine box spring must also be replaced with one that has a traditional Z-shape instead of the curly-Q style that the factory provides. The Winchester conversion may only hold 2 cartridges in the magazine box, unless you purchase an extra deep magazine box and bottom metal from Sunny Hill, Williams Firearms, Jim Wisner or Ted Blackburn. Use of an extra deep magazine box necessitates replacement of the stock with another stock having greater depth of wood. Alternatively, it may be possible to fit 3 rounds in a model 70 conversion with the factory magazine box if the follower is replaced with one having a lower profile, or if the follower is milled to shorten it.

Another option is to rebuild a surplus military Mauser 98 action to be a .470 Capstick dangerous game rifle. This is a very involved project and includes replacing the magazine box/bottom metal, spring and follower and opening up the receiver to match it. Further, some machining of the new magazine box may be needed, since no one makes a magazine box expressly intended to hold 4 rounds of .470 Capstick. Proper feeding is not easy to accomplish and requires a big bore expert.

The stepped feed rails plus a modified feed ramp, achieve smooth feeding of flat nosed solid bullets in this rifle. Any of these routes can result in a very functional and very accurate dangerous game rifle. Frankly speaking, there are not a lot of gunsmiths who know how to get a big bore to feed properly, making the CZ550 conversion very attractive because there is so little to do.

== In the field ==
The .470 Capstick is designed for use as a dangerous game cartridge but it has proven very useful on light game as well. The key is to select a bullet suitable for the game. If a bullet designed for use on cape buffalo is used on whitetails, it undoubtedly will not expand. For light game, Hawk bullets which expand quickly or 400-grain (26 g) pistol bullets may be best. When the .470 Capstick is loaded with a 500-grain (32 g) bullet to a muzzle velocity of 2,300 ft/s (700 m/s) and sighted in 3 inches (76 mm) high at 100 yards (91 m), it is only about a foot low at 300 yards (270 m), giving it more effective range than many cartridges which are popular for deer and elk hunting.

Another consideration in choosing a bullet for hunting is the velocity window of the bullet. For example, the 500-grain (32 g) Woodleigh soft point is designed to expand at .470 Nitro Express velocities (2150 fps), and if pushed to the 2,400 ft/s (730 m/s) potential of the .470 Capstick, the Woodleigh will tend to expand very quickly and sacrifice penetration. The Woodleigh soft nose was designed to expand at the lower velocities of the .470 Nitro Express, and the fact that it held together at all in the .470 Capstick is testimony to the Woodleigh's toughness. Penetration was just over 3 feet (0.91 m).

== See also ==
- List of rifle cartridges
- 12 mm caliber
