= Lamar Giles =

American author

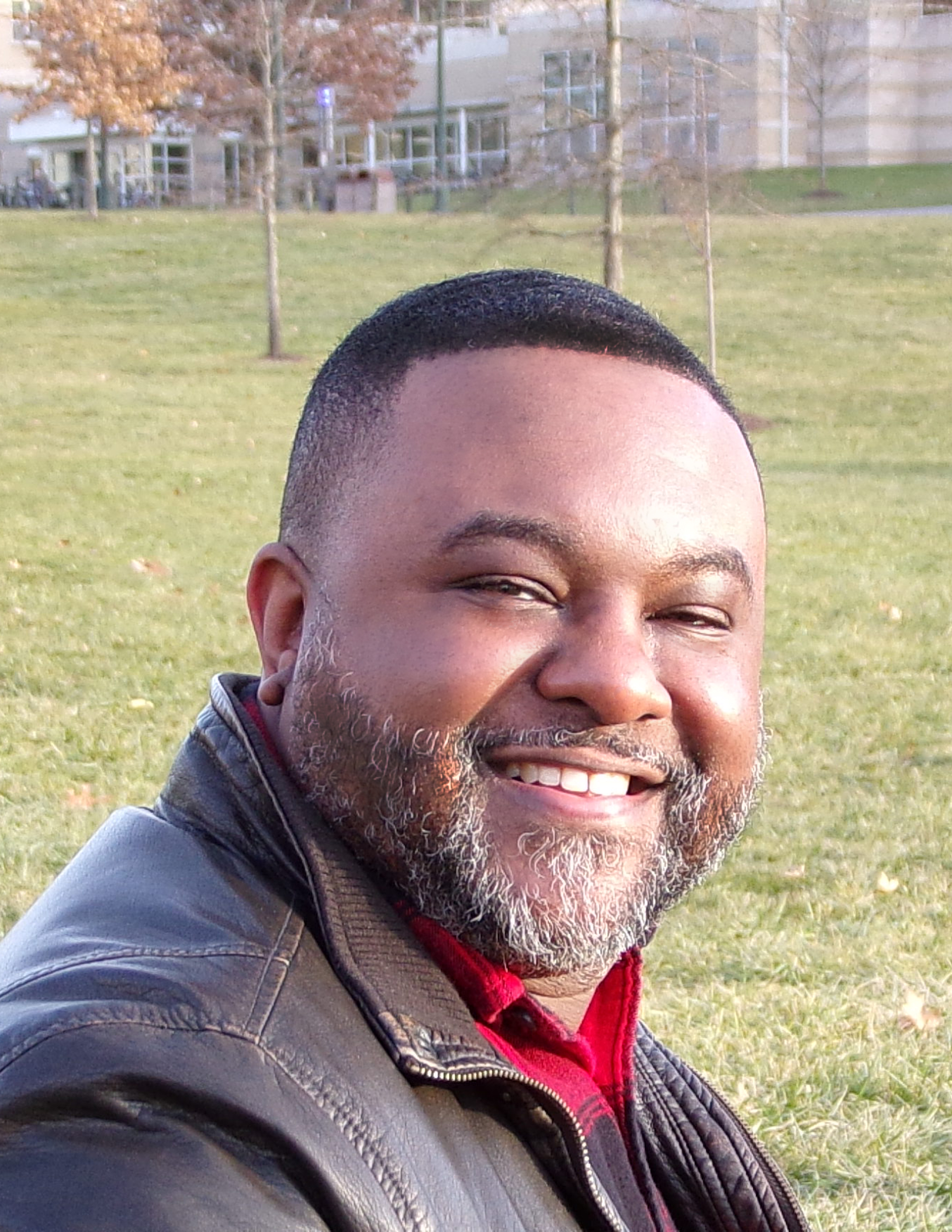
- Born: November 14, 1979 (age 46); Hopewell, Virginia, U.S.
- Education: B.S. in Communications, minor in English; M.F.A in English, Creative Writing
- Alma mater: Old Dominion University
- Writing career
- Years active: 2004–present
- Genre: Young Adult Fiction
- Notable works: Fake ID, Spin, The Last Last-Day-of-Summer, Not So Pure and Simple
- Website: lamargiles.com

Lamar Giles (born November 14, 1979) is an American author of young adult novels and short stories. He best known for his award-winning novels with his most popular being Fake ID, SPIN, Not So Pure and Simple, and The Legendary Alston Boys middle grade fantasy series. He is also one of the founding members of the American non-profit We Need Diverse Books.

== Personal life ==
Giles grew up next to an army base in Hopewell, Virginia. He wrote his first novel at 14 and graduated from Hopewell High School in 1997. Giles has a B.S. in communications with a Minor in English from Old Dominion University in Norfolk, Virginia. He started wanting to become a published writer after reading Stephen King's On Writing in college, and sold his first short story at age 21. He also independently published novels and short stories as L.R. Giles. Giles worked as a real estate agent for a while before being awarded a fellowship from the Virginia Commission of the Arts in 2006. He sold what would become his first novel, Fake ID, at 31 years old.

Giles is a founding member of the non-profit We Need Diverse Books, their former VP of Communications, and was on their 2017 advisory board. Giles was a judge for the 2018 National Book Awards and is a faculty member in the Spalding University MFA program. He was named the inaugural writer-in-residence of William & Mary Libraries in 2025.

He lives with his wife in Chesapeake, Virginia.

== Selected works ==
Giles' debut young adult novel, Fake ID, was published by HarperCollins in 2014. Fake ID is a thriller following an African-American teen moving to a new town under a fake identity because of his father's crimes and who gets entangled in solving the mysterious murder of his best friend. Giles cites Gerald Shur's non-fiction works and Casanegra by Steve Barnes as some of his inspirations for the novel.

His next novel, Endangered, about a vigilante teen whose undercover identity gets revealed to the world, was published by Harper Teen in 2015.

Giles is the editor of the anthology Fresh Ink, a collection of stories by authors Nicola Yoon, Malinda Lo, Melissa de la Cruz, Sara Farizan, Eric Gansworth, Walter Dean Myers, Daniel José Older, Jason Reynolds, Gene Luen Yang, Sharon G. Flake, Schuyler Bailar, and Aminah Mae Safi about marginalized experiences. It was published by Crown in 2018.

== Awards ==
Awards for Giles's writing
Year	Title	Award	Result	Ref.
2015	Fake ID	Edgar Allan Poe Award for Best Young Adult Novel	Finalist	
2015-2016	Fake ID	Georgia Peach Award	Nominee	
2015-2016	Fake ID	Virginia's Readers Choice Award	Winner	
2016	Endangered	Edgar Allan Poe Award for Best Young Adult Novel	Finalist	
2016-17	Fake ID	Louisiana Young Readers Choice Award	Nominee	
2017	Fake ID	Lincoln Award	Nominee	

== Bibliography ==
=== As Lamar Giles ===
==== Novels ====
- Fake ID (HarperCollins, 2014)
- Endangered (HarperTeen, 2015)
- Overturned (Scholastic, 2017)
- Spin (Scholastic, 2019)
- The Last Last-Day-of-Summer (Versify/HMH, 2019)
- Not So Pure and Simple (HarperTeen, 2020)
- The Last Mirror on the Left (Versify/HMH, 2020)
- The Last Chance for Logan County (Versify/HMH, 2021)
- The Getaway (Scholastic, 2022)
- Star Wars: Sanctuary (Penguin Random House, 2025)

==== Anthology contributions ====
- "The Historian, the Garrison, and the Cantankerous Cat Woman" in Three Sides of a Heart: Stories About Love Triangles, edited by Natalie C. Parker (HarperTeen, 2018)
- "Black. Nerd. Problems." in Black Enough, edited by Ibi Zoboi (Balzer + Bray, 2019)
- "The Oval Filter" in His Hideous Heart: 13 of Edgar Allan Poe's Most Unsettling Tales Reimagined, edited by Dahlia Adler (Flatiron Books, 2019)
- "Ellison's CORNucopia: A Logan County Story" in The Hero Next Door, edited by Olugbemisola Rhuday-Perkovich (Crown, 2019)
- "Surprise. Party." in Super Puzzletastic Mysteries, Edited by Chris Grabenstein (HarperCollins, 2020)
- "The Storms and Sunshine of My Life" in RECOGNIZE! An Anthology Honoring and Amplifying Black Life, edited by Wade Hudson & Cheryl Willis Hudson (Crown, 2021)
- “There’s Going to be a Fight in the Cafeteria on Friday and You Better Not Bring Batman” in Black Boy Joy, edited by Kwame Mbalia (Delacorte Press, 2021)
- "Love to Hate" in GENERATION WONDER: The New Age of Heroes edited by Barry Lyga, Illustrated by Colleen Doran (Amulet Books, 2022)

==== Anthologies edited ====
- Fresh Ink (Crown, 2018)

=== As L.R. Giles ===
==== Short stories ====
- in Dark Dreams: A Collection of Horror and Suspense by Black Writers, edited by Brandon Massey (Dafina, 2004)
- in Voices from the Other Side, edited by Brandon Massey (Dafina, 2004)
- in Whispers in the Night, edited by Brandon Massey (Dafina, 2007)
- "Live Again" (2010)
- "The Darkness Kept" (2010)
- "The Track" (2011)
- "The Shadow Gallery" (2011)
- "Lover's Spat" (2011)
- "Doc Damage's Very Bad Day" (2011)
- "Power and Purpose" (2011)
- "When Scary People Know Your Name" (2012)

==== Novels ====
- The Serpent and the Stallion, co-authored with Becky Rodgers Boyette (2011)
