= The Naturals (novel series) =

American novel series by Jennifer Lynn Barnes

- Covers from the four main novels.
- Author: Jennifer Lynn Barnes
- Cover artist: Abby Kuperstock
- Country: United States
- Language: English
- Genre: Young adult fiction Crime fiction Mystery; Romance
- Publisher: Hachette Books
- Published: November 5, 2013 - November 3, 2026
- Media type: Print
- No. of books: 6
- Website: Official website

The Naturals is a series of young adult novels by Jennifer Lynn Barnes. Beginning with a 2013 novel of the same name, the series follows the life of Cassie Hobbes, a 17-year-old girl who is contacted by the FBI to join a special program. The other members consist of Dean Redding, Lia Zhang, Michael Townsend, and Sloane Tavish. Cassie Hobbes' mother was murdered, and they never found the body. One day at a diner where Cassie works, a mysterious boy appears.

The initial novel was followed by Killer Instinct, published in 2014. The third novel, All In, came out in 2015, and the fourth novel, Bad Blood, was published in 2016. A novella, titled Twelve, was published in 2017. The fifth book, Dangerous Impulses, came out in 2026.

== Novels ==
There are five novels and one e-novella in The Naturals. They include, in this order, The Naturals, Killer Instinct, All In, Bad Blood, and Dangerous Impulses. There is also the e-novella Twelve.

== Partial Synopsis of The Naturals ==
The story follows Cassie Hobbes, a 17-year-old girl with extraordinary profiling abilities who is recruited into a special program called the Naturals made by the FBI. One day, while she is working at a diner, a boy (later revealed to be Michael Townsend) appears. When taking his order, Cassie asks the boy what eggs he would like. She is surprised when the boy tells her to guess. She proceeds to use her profiling skills to deduce his preferred egg style. The boy then finishes his food and leaves, and Cassie comes to clean the table. Cassie then finds a card from the FBI. She finds the name “Agent Briggs” written on the card and eventually goes to the FBI headquarters to meet him. There, she meets Michael again, before going to Agent Briggs. Agent Briggs tells her about a classified program, where teens with exceptional abilities will work for the FBI to solve cold cases. She accepts the offer after a while and moves to Quantico, Virginia to go live with her fellow naturals. There, we meet Agent Locke, who is a profiler like Cassie. After, we meet Lia Zhang (a human lie detector), Sloane Tavish (a statistician), Dean Redding (a profiler as well) and Michael Townsend (an emotion reader).

== Reception ==
Alex Winters of The State Journal-Register praised the series and said, "If you enjoy suspenseful crime thrillers and whodunnits with a dash of teen melodrama, then this is the book series for you." The New York Times best-selling author Ally Carter said the series was "a must-read for anyone who likes books about real teens who have no superpowers and yet aren’t quite typical either." Reviewing the first novel, Kirkus Reviews wrote:

This savvy thriller grabs readers right away. Cassie’s outsider feelings are convincing and give credence to her actions throughout the story. There is enough violence, grisly description, and plot surprises to keep crime-show devotees reading. Unanswered questions will have those readers on tenterhooks for the next in the series.

Also reviewing the first novel, Publishers Weekly lauded the writing by Jennifer Lynn Barnes, stating that "Barnes shows every card at just the right moment, catching readers off-guard at the final reveal. It’s a stay-up-late-to-finish kind of book, and it doesn’t disappoint."

Kristi Elle Jemtegaard, from Booklist, wrote in her review for the initial book that "Nevertheless, teens looking for a fast-paced heart-stopper may find the pace slow at first, but then the thrills and chills kick in—only to leave listeners hanging, as this is the initial volume of a projected series."

== Accolades ==
Accolades for The Naturals
Novel	Year	Award	Result	Ref.
The Naturals	2017	Lincoln Award	Nominee	
The Naturals	2017	Missouri Gateway Readers Award	Nominee	
The Naturals	2014	YALSA's Best Fiction for Young Adults	Selection	
