= Sadie (novel) =

2018 novel by Courtney Summers

- First edition
- Author: Courtney Summers
- Language: English
- Genre: Young adult novel, mystery fiction
- Publisher: Wednesday Books
- Publication date: September 4, 2018
- Media type: Print (hardcover, paperback)
- Pages: 308
- ISBN: 9781250105714

Sadie is a novel written by Courtney Summers. The book was released on September 4, 2018, and is told from two perspectives: some chapters offering Sadie's point of view and some chapters being styled as transcripts from a podcast called "The Girls" hosted by a man named West McCray. The release of the book was accompanied by the release of a mock true-crime podcast titled The Girls: Find Sadie which is available on Apple Podcasts and Stitcher. The audiobook was narrated by Dan Bittner, Rebecca Soler, and Gabra Zackman.

== Reception ==
Sadie became a New York Times bestseller on September 29, 2018, and is a Junior Library Guild book. The novel received starred reviews from Booklist, Kirkus Reviews, Publishers Weekly, and Shelf Awareness.

Explaining the book's structure, Booklist wrote, "Alternating between transcripts of the podcast and Sadie’s first-person account of her investigation, Summers’ novel is filled with her trademark biting commentary on sexual assault and the mistreatment of girls and women at the hands of predatory men." They concluded, "Though Sadie’s story is occasionally a bit overwrought, her hunt for Mattie’s killer is captivating, and Summers excels at slowly unspooling both Sadie’s and West’s investigations at a measured, tantalizing pace." Also discussing the book's format, Publishers Weekly wrote, "Initially distracting, the podcast becomes an effective way to build out backstory and let myriad characters have their say. The result is a taut, suspenseful book about abuse and power that feels personal, as if Summers ... can’t take one more dead or abused girl. Readers may well feel similarly." Kirkus called the novel "a riveting tour de force," and School Library Journal referred to it as "a heartrending must-have." Shelf Awareness wrote, "Haunting, captivating and full of surprising moments of beauty, Sadie leaves a mark on the reader and will open eyes to how very many stories begin with, end with or are wholly about 'a dead girl.'"

Quill & Quire highlighted how "Summers specializes in depicting the raw emotions of traumatized girls, drawing her reader deep into the characters’ anguished and often unhinged thoughts. ... It leaves you haunted by Sadie’s and Mattie’s tragic lives and mindful of all the real-life missing and murdered girls with similar stories. Most importantly it questions why society is simultaneously desensitized and addicted to these narratives and the ethics of making entertainment out of them."

Kirkus, NPR, and Publishers Weekly named Sadie one of the best novels of 2018. School Library Journal named the audiobook one of the top ten audiobooks of 2018.

Awards and honors for Sadie
Year	Award	Result	Ref.
2018	Booklist Audio Stars for Youth	Selection	
2018	Cybils Award for Young Adult Fiction	Winner	
2018	Goodreads Choice Award for Young Adult Fiction	Nominee	
2019	Amazing Audiobooks for Young Adults	Top 10	
2019	Audie Award for Young Adult Title	Finalist	
2019	Edgar Allan Poe Award for Best Young Adult Novel	Winner	
2019	John Spray Mystery Award	Winner	
2019	Odyssey Award	Winner	
2019	Outstanding Books for the College Bound in Literature and Language Arts	Selection	
2019	Quick Picks for Reluctant Young Adult Readers	Top 10	
2020	White Pine Award	Winner	
