= Debutantes (novel series) =

Young adult mystery series by Jennifer Lynn Barnes

- Little White Lies (2018); Deadly Little Scandals (2019)
- Author: Jennifer Lynn Barnes
- Country: United States
- Language: English
- Genre: Young adult fiction, mystery fiction
- Publisher: Freeform; Little, Brown Books for Young Readers
- Media type: Print, ebook
- No. of books: 2

Debutantes is a young adult mystery novel series by Jennifer Lynn Barnes. The series consist of two novels: Little White Lies (2018) and Deadly Little Scandals (2019).

== Little White Lies ==
Little White Lies was published November 6, 2018 by Freeform. The book received positive reviews from Publishers Weekly, Booklist, and Kirkus Reviews.

== Deadly Little Scandals ==
Deadly Little Scandals was published November 5, 2019 by Little, Brown Books for Young Readers. The book received positive reviews from Booklist and Kirkus Reviews.
