= Book Riot =

Literary website

- Website type: Literature
- Available in: English
- Headquarters: {{{location_country}}}
- Owner: Riot New Media Company
- Creators: Jeff O'Neal and Clinton Kabler
- Website: bookriot.com
- Launched: 2011; 15 years ago

Book Riot is an independent literary website founded in 2011. The site publishes a range of book-related articles, book reviews, newsletters, and podcasts. The site is operated by Riot New Media Company, which was co-founded by Jeff O'Neal and Clinton Kabler.

== Content ==
Book Riot content includes news articles, book reviews, and book lists.

Regular columns on Book Riot include Kelly Jensen's "Censorship News", which has chronicled book banning in the United States since 2021. Book Riot has also collaborated with the non-profit EveryLibrary Institute to research public perception of book banning and trust in public libraries.

== Podcasts ==
Book Riot podcasts include Book Riot: The Podcast, hosted by O'Neal and chief of staff Rebecca Joines Schinsky, and All the Books, hosted by Liberty Hardy.

== See also ==
- Literary Hub
