= Capstick (surname) =

Capstick is an English surname, it may refer to:

- John H. Capstick (1856–1918), American Republican Party politician
- John Walton Capstick (1838–1937), English Bursar of Trinity College, Cambridge
- Peter Hathaway Capstick (1940–1996), American hunter and author
- Tony Capstick (1944–2003), British comedian, actor, musician and broadcaster

== See also ==
- Copestake
