= June Hur =

Korean-Canadian author (born 1989)

- Born: Hur Joo-eun; March 14, 1989 (age 37); South Korea
- Education: University of Toronto
- Years active: 2020–present
- Notable work: The Red Palace
- Website: junehur.com

June Hur (Korean: 허주은; born March 14, 1989) is a Korean-Canadian author who is best known for her historical young adult novels set during Korea's Joseon period. Her first novel, The Silence of Bones, was published by Feiwel & Friends in April 2020.

Her novels have been nominated for the Edgar Allan Poe Award for Best Young Adult Novel four times, winning once, for The Red Palace (2022).

== Personal life ==
Hur was born in South Korea and moved to the United States and later Canada at age three. She later returned to South Korea for high school. She is a graduate of the University of Toronto, where she studied History and Literature, and currently resides in Toronto with her husband and children. She is Christian.

== Bibliography ==
- The Silence of Bones (2020)
- The Forest of Stolen Girls (2021)
- The Red Palace (2022)
- A Crane Among Wolves (2024)
- Behind Five Willows (2026)

== Awards ==
Work	Year	Award	Category	Result	Ref.
The Silence of Bones	2020	Freeman Book Award	Young Adult / High School Literature	Honor	
The Silence of Bones	2021	Edgar Allan Poe Award	Best Young Adult Novel	Finalist	
The Silence of Bones	2021	Amy Mathers Teen Book Award		Finalist	
The Forest of Stolen Girls	2021	Freeman Book Award	Young Adult / High School Literature	Of Note	
The Forest of Stolen Girls	2022	Edgar Allan Poe Award	Best Young Adult Novel	Finalist	
The Forest of Stolen Girls	2022	White Pine Award		Nominated	
The Red Palace	2022	Junior Library Guild	Mystery / Adventure	Selection	
The Red Palace	2022	Freeman Book Award	Young Adult / High School Literature	Honor	
The Red Palace	2022	The Globe 100		Finalist	
The Red Palace	2023	Edgar Allan Poe Award	Best Young Adult Novel	Won	
The Red Palace	2023	Amy Mathers Teen Book Award		Finalist	
A Crane Among Wolves	2024	Freeman Book Award	Young Adult / High School Literature	Honor	
A Crane Among Wolves	2024	Governor General's Literary Award	Young People's Literature – Text	Finalist	
A Crane Among Wolves	2024	Goodreads Choice Award	Young Adult Fiction	Nominated	
A Crane Among Wolves	2025	Edgar Allan Poe Award	Best Young Adult Novel	Finalist	
A Crane Among Wolves	2025	Walter Dean Myers Award		Honor	
