= The Fixer (book series) =

Young adult mystery series by Jennifer Lynn Barnes

The Fixer is a young adult mystery novel series by Jennifer Lynn Barnes, published by Bloomsbury Children's Books. The series consists of two books: The Fixer (2015) and The Long Game (2016).

== The Fixer ==
The Fixer was published July 7, 2015. The book received positive reviews from School Library Journal and Booklist, as well as a mixed review from Kirkus.

In 2018, the book was nominated for the South Carolina Book Award for Young Adult and the Missouri Truman Readers Award.

== Plot ==
A girl named Tess Kendrick talks back to her teacher for picking on another student. After being sent to the guidance counselor, she argues back until the counselor mentions her grandfather. She agrees to behave more and heads home.

A couple of days later, Tess is at her grandfather's ranch. Ivy, her sister, shows up after three years of leaving Tess. After a conversation with their grandfather, who suffers from Alzheimer's, Ivy decides to take her grandfather to a treatment facility and take Tess with her to Washington, D.C..

Making it to D.C., Tess starts her first day at Hardwicke, a prestigious school. Getting a tour from Vivvie, she finds out her sister is called a "fixer," who fixes problems for certain people in power. She then finds a girl in the bathroom crying. Tess hears that the girl was being bullied by a group of guys for inappropriate pictures, so she goes and deletes the photos from the guy's phone.

The next school day, Emilia asks Tess to work for her, since word from yesterday's fix got around the school. Tess refuses the offers of money and favors. For the rest of the day, she continuously gets people asking to fix problems for them, but she refuses.

Walking outside to eat lunch, Tess and Vivvie see a boy standing close to the edge of the roof. Tess goes up to stop whatever he is doing. After a crowd forms, the boy, called Asher, finally heads down. Tess realizes that this gives everyone else the impression that she had taken on Emilia's case.

Tess meets with Asher and Henry during his grandfather's funeral. Henry makes it clear he doesn't want her or her sister here. She then heads to Vivvie's house, due to her absence this past week. When she sees Vivvie, she can tell that her father has been hitting her. Vivvie also tells her that she thinks her father killed Henry's grandfather. She had heard him practicing his speech the morning of, before Henry's grandfather died. To help Vivvie, Tess lets her "hire" her to find evidence that her father did this. Asher, who was waiting outside, hears this but promises not to tell his best friend Henry until they get solid evidence.

Their first attempt to get evidence was trying the burner phone. After having Emilia fix it and promising her a favor, Tess calls the two phone numbers. The first one rings out. The second is greeted by a man who promises the money once he gets his nomination. To find out whose voice that was, Tess starts investigating who could become a part of the Supreme Court with the now open spot. When she found the voice that matched, she and Vivvie went to Ivy. Ivy was disappointed that they didn't come to her sooner, and told them both not to dig themselves deeper into this.

After Tess gets herself suspended from school, Ivy takes her home. Once there, William Keyes and the First Lady come out to talk. Tess finds out from William that Vivvie's father killed himself. After arguing with Ivy, Tess runs away. She is then called by an unknown number, who happened to be Asher. He then slips up and accidentally tells Henry that his grandfather was killed. To give him the full context, Tess asks him to pick her up. Henry then agrees to continue to find out anything about the other phone number.

Later, Henry finds out that his grandfather was at a fundraiser the night before. Thinking that someone poisoned him then, they look to the four-hundred attendees who were there. The next day, an article was published that included the person who was involved in Henry's grandfather's murder, Pierce, stating that he was a high candidate for the Supreme Court. Henry has figured out a plan to try to figure it out, which was to talk to the reporter who made the article.

Tess attends a party to try and help Henry with the investigation, but ends up running into her sister. Due to her not staying home, Ivy and Adam make her go somewhere else where she would be safe. Ivy then tells Tess that she wasn't her sister, she was her mother. Tess gets on the plane and heads to Boston, where her grandfather is. She spends time with her grandfather and Bodie, who was sent to watch her. On her way to bring her grandfather's clothes to him, she gets kidnapped. Once she awoke, she could see him, Damien Kostas, the secret service agent that protected the president. He wanted something that Ivy could give him. Once Ivy was able to get there, she offered a trade, herself for Tess. To get what Kostas wanted, she would need to be the one in danger. He agrees, and lets Tess go.

Once Tess wakes up, she finds herself back in D.C.. She borrows a phone to call Vivvie, who then has her aunt call Adam. Once at Adam's house, he tells her that Ivy knew it was a secret service member they were looking for. He also tells her that Kostas wants his son to be pardoned from his crime. They talk to the president, but he will not give in to what Kostas wants.

To figure out a way to give Kostas the pardon, Tess goes to William Keyes. They find out that Tess's father is Williams other son, Tommy, who passed away during service. William is willing to cooperate due to her being his granddaughter, but for a price.

While watching the news with Henry, Asher, and Vivvie, they see Ivy is freed and able to go. William then texts Tess that it is done. Ivy and Tess have a heartfelt moment, and try to become better for the other. After a week of school, Tess gets told she has to do her part of the deal. She will have to become William's heir, and change her full name to Tess Kendrick Keyes, as well as visit him every week.

== Characters ==
Tess Kendrick

The protagonist of the novel. Moved to Montana at the age of 4, then moved to Washington with her sister at the age of 18.

Ivy Kendrick

One of the main characters. In the beginning, she is mentioned as Tess' older sister. Cares for her sister, but is very secretive due to her job

Grandfather

The grandfather of Tess and Ivy. He suffers from Alzheimer's. Originally under Tess's care, he is put in a treatment facility to help take care of him in Boston.

Bodie

Described with "a hint of stubble," and having visible muscles. Ivy's chauffeur and bodyguard.

Adam Keyes

Described as "perfect posture," poker face, and six feet tall. Ivy's best friend.

Vivvie Bharani

One of the main characters. She is described with wavy black hair, dark brown skin, and a round face. Tess's best friend.

Maya Rojas

Captain of three sport teams as a junior.

Di

Nicknamed DI from diplomatic immunity due to the hard pronunciation of her real name. She has white blonde hair, and is from Iceland.

Emilia Rhodes

One of the main characters. She has strawberry-blonde hair and green-blue eyes.

Henry

One of the main characters. Gets involved after hearing Asher say something he wasn't supposed to.

Asher Rhodes

One of the main characters. Emilia's twin brother. Goes with Tess on their investigations.

William Keyes

Father to Adam. Ivy used to work for him, until he did something to someone she cared about. Tess's Grandfather.

Georgia Nolan

First Lady of the House. Familial to Ivy and Tess.

Damien Kostas

Secret service agent. Ends up being the one who kidnaps Tess to get someone a pardon.

== The Long Game ==
The Long Game was published June 7, 2016. The book received a positive review from Booklist, as well as a mixed review from Kirkus.
