= This Is Not a Test (2025 film) =

American zombie horror film

- Theatrical release poster
- Directed by: Adam MacDonald
- Screenplay by: Adam MacDonald
- Based on: This Is Not a Test by Courtney Summers
- Produced by: Cybill Lui; Adam MacDonald
- Starring: Olivia Holt; Froy Gutierrez
- Cinematography: Christian Bielz
- Edited by: Pamela Bayne
- Music by: Lee Malia
- Production companies: Anova Pictures; North Avenue Pictures; WorldOne Entertainment
- Distributed by: Independent Film Company; Shudder (United States); Blue Fox Entertainment (Canada)
- Release dates: October 17, 2025 (Brooklyn Horror Film Festival); February 20, 2026 (United States); February 27, 2026 (Canada)
- Running time: 103 minutes
- Countries: Canada; United States
- Language: English
- Box office: $213,951

This Is Not a Test is a 2025 apocalyptic horror-thriller film directed, written and produced by Adam MacDonald, starring Olivia Holt and Froy Gutierrez. It is an adaptation of the 2012 novel by Courtney Summers. The film was released in the United States on February 20, 2026, by Independent Film Company and Shudder.

== Plot ==
In December 1998, Sloane Price reads her suicide note in her bathtub when her abusive father calls her for breakfast. A frantic woman screams for help at the door as zombies overrun the neighborhood. One of them breaks through the living room window and bites Sloane's father before he kills it with a shard of glass. Shocked, Sloane flees the house, abandoning her infected father. On the streets, Sloane escapes a zombie by climbing into a neighbor's backyard, where she joins two high school classmates, Rhys Moreno and Cary Chen, in their search for sanctuary. They soon encounter classmates Grace and Trace Casper and their protective mother, who argues with Chen over safety measures. That night, the group sleeps together in an upstairs room of a house. Sloane remembers her older sister Lily, who once gifted her with a birthday letter in a yellow envelope, which Sloane tucked into the glove compartment of the family car to read later. Their father's abuse eventually drove Lily away.

The group escapes from the house after a zombie breaks in and attracts more. They flee to the local high school, where Mrs. Casper sacrifices herself to save the teens. Inside the building, Cary kills a zombified Principal Lively, and the group barricades themselves inside. In the gym, Trace angrily confronts Cary, blaming him for his mother's death, and they briefly fight. While waiting for rescue, the teens discover their English teacher, Mr. Baxter, sleeping in a closet with a gun, which the boys take for themselves. When Baxter awakes and is given food by the teens, they notice his unusual behavior and discover a bite wound on his arm. Despite his denial, they force him outside, but Baxter bites Cary before being ejected. As a precaution, Cary is isolated in the nurse's office.

Patrolling the school, Sloane finds a severely injured Baxter in a hallway. As Grace approaches, the now-zombified Baxter attacks. Trace fires Baxter's gun to stop him, but accidentally shoots Grace, who dies in Trace's arms. Trace blames Sloane and attacks her before Cary and Rhys restrain him. Later, Sloane visits Trace as he stays by Grace's body. Sloane apologizes and says she would have done the same for Lily. Trace gains Sloane's forgiveness before shooting himself in the head. Deciding they cannot remain in the school, Sloane, Rhys, and Cary head out to get a car and drive to a safe location broadcast on the radio. In one of the town's homes, Cary volunteers to distract the zombies outside while the others escape. He runs into the street and disappears down the road as zombies pursue him.

Sloane and Rhys return to her home, where they find an infected Lily in the basement; Sloane kills her with a crowbar to the head. Her father's body lies nearby, implying he had attacked and infected Lily. The pair takes the family car and prepares to drive to the safe area. As Rhys finishes details with the car, Sloane takes the yellow envelope from the glove compartment and reads Lily's warm words for her. When Rhys starts the engine, Sloane discards her suicide note, and they depart together.

== Cast ==
- Olivia Holt as Sloane Price
- Froy Gutierrez as Rhys Moreno
- Carson MacCormac as Trace Casper, Grace's twin brother
- Corteon Moore as Carson ''Cary'' Chen
- Chloe Avakian as Grace Casper, Trace's twin sister
- Joelle Farrow as Lily Price, Sloane's older sister
- Luke Macfarlane as Mr. Baxter
- Krista Bridges as Mrs. Casper (uncredited)
- Jeff Roop as Sloane's and Lily's father (uncredited)

== Production ==
The film is from Anova Pictures in association with North Avenue Pictures and WorldOne Entertainment. It is directed by Adam MacDonald who is also a producer alongside Cybill Lui. It is adapted from the 2012 young adult novel by Courtney Summers.

The cast is led by Olivia Holt, Froy Gutierrez, and Luke MacFarlane, as well as Corteon Moore, Chloe Avakian and Carson MacCormac.

Principal photography took place in February 2025 in Hamilton, Ontario, Canada.

== Release ==
The film premiered at the 2025 Toronto After Dark Film Festival. The film was released in the United States on February 20, 2026, by Independent Film Company and Shudder, and was released in Canada a week later by Blue Fox Entertainment.

== Critical reception ==
On the review aggregator website Rotten Tomatoes, 42% of 38 critics' reviews are positive, with an average rating of 5.3/10. The website's consensus reads: "Weighed down by weak characters and technical shortcomings, This Is Not a Test is a thin, frustrating zombie film with not much to say." Metacritic, which uses a weighted average, assigned the film a score of 36 out of 100, based on five critics, indicating "generally unfavorable" reviews.

Ross McIndoe of Slant Magazine gave the film a score of 1/4, writing, "The film brings the undead to life, so to speak, with some solid make-up work, and the story is filled with imaginatively gory bits of action. Unfortunately, it has a much harder time trying to bring its non-zombie characters to life." RogerEbert.com's Simon Abrams wrote, "What's mostly lacking is a matter of character-enhancing detail, the kind that would better integrate the movie's high-concept thrills with its heartstring-tugging melodrama. Soapy's not bad, but This is Not a Test lacks the sensationalism or sensitivity to make it more than a wan misfire", and gave it a score of 2/4. Rue Morgue's Michael Gingold said, "What it needed, at this point in its particular genre, was either a more adventurous approach to the material or a deeper, fresher dig into the psyches of its young people forced to grow up fast."

Jeffrey M. Anderson of Common Sense Media gave the film a score of 3/5, writing, "It's only a so-so zombie flick, but this horror thriller is still a pretty good YA movie, character-focused and in tune with the teens' troubles, frustrations, cares, and concerns." Andrew Parker of The GATE gave it 6/10, calling it "a meat and potatoes kind of horror movie with just enough of a powerful hook to keep things interesting."
