= The Art of Secrets =

Book by James Klise

- First edition
- Author: James Klise
- Genre: Realistic fiction, Mystery
- Published: 2014
- Publisher: Algonquin Young Readers
- Pages: 272
- Awards: Edgar Award for Best Young Adult (2015)
- ISBN: 978-1-616-20195-1
- Website: The Art of Secrets

The Art of Secrets is a book by James Klise and published by Algonquin Young Readers on 22 April 2014. It won the Edgar Award for Best Young Adult in 2015. It was also nominated for the Dorothy Canfield Fisher Children's Book Award in 2016.
