= The Interrogation of Gabriel James =

Mystery novel by Charlie Price

First edition (publ. Farrar, Straus and Giroux)

The Interrogation of Gabriel James is a mystery novel by American author Charlie Price. It centers on the interrogation of high school student Gabriel James after several crimes have been committed.

The story is told in first person and information is unveiled through Gabriel's answers to the detective's questions, often through flashbacks. The book won several awards, including the 2010 and 2011 Edgar Award for best young adult fiction.

== Plot summary ==
The story opens in Billings, Montana where high school sophomore Gabriel James is interrogated by two policemen concerning two murders that he apparently knows about. The officer leading the interview is a suspicious yet sympathetic woman, and the second officer is a rude and quick to judge man whose attention to the interrogation seems to shift drastically from extreme interest to seeming apathetic. Their differences in style leads to several exchanges between them throughout the book. As the interrogation starts, Gabriel introduces his ex-girlfriend Anita and goes on to tell how he and Anita were forced to break up after her parents became aware of a camping trip the two took alone weeks before. This is the first of many problems Gabriel has girls and gives the reader the impression of a confused teenage boy.

As the police continue to ask questions, they are introduced to Danny Two Bull and learn about a string of pet murders that have been occurring since the arrival of Danny. After transferring from a Native American reservation, Danny Two Bull joins Gabriel's high school cross country team. Though Danny is very reserved, he makes it known that he is there to prove that a Native American can outrun any white man. The pet murders are thought to be a threat towards Danny after he opens his locker to find a dead dog inside. As the pet murders continue, Gabriel gradually becomes more curious as to the people behind them and, in hopes of getting some information, asks a local homeless man named Durmond Williams if he has heard or seen anything. Durmond informs Gabriel of a pair suspicious teenage twin boys with a yellow truck who have just recently arrived in town.

After being denied a date by a shy seemingly sheltered classmate named Raelene, Gabriel becomes obsessed with the uncovering reason behind the rejection. Several attempts to talk to Raelene push her away even more and this only fuels Gabriel's interest. The book takes a slightly creepy turn that leaves the reader with an uneasy feeling. As Gabriel's week prolongs the thought of Raelene turns into an obsession and he goes to her house late one night. While snooping around the secluded farm house he looks through a window to see Raelene naked in an aprin watching TV with her father and brother, each of them naked as well. Gabriel races away with more questions than he came with fueling this obsession even more.

By now the story is coming together as flyers are being left around campus with a manifesto being signed by a one “Doc. Death MDD.” After seeing Raelene's brother with the twins in the yellow truck and the release of the flyers, Gabriel begins to suspect the three of them for the recent events. Determined to get more clues he proceeds to return to the secluded farm house one night. As he approaches the house he is attacked by a goose which in turn alarms the rather old father. Armed with a shot gun the man yells for Gabriel as he struggles with the steps. This gives time to retreat to his car all the while attempting to fight off the goose. Not being able to get to his car fast enough he runs straight into the twins and Raelene's brother. He is assaulted, immobilized and is forced to listen to the gang decide his destiny.

After debating whether to kill or seriously damage him they decide to bring him into the house and let their father decide. When he gets inside he is forced into a chair, surrounded by the gang and the father begins to question his son about Gabriel. After discovering he is a classmate of Raelene's he sends one of the twins to move his car out of sight leaving one twin with a shotgun, Raelene's brother and the old father. During a discussion Gabriel manages to get a hold of the shotgun, and miraculously escape. The interrogation comes to an end and the officers release Gabriel. Feeling much of the weight lift from his shoulders he was left with the thought of the future and what legal matters still remained.
