= This Is Not a Test (novel) =

2012 novel by Courtney Summers

- First edition
- Author: Courtney Summers
- Cover artist: Design by Lisa Marie Pompilio, Photograph by Vladimir Piskunov/Getty Images
- Language: English
- Series: This Is Not a Test
- Genre: Survival Horror
- Publisher: St. Martin's Press, Bindery Books
- Publication date: June 19, 2012
- Publication place: Canada
- Media type: Print (paperback), ebook
- Pages: 336 pp (first edition)
- ISBN: 9780312656744
- Followed by: Please Remain Calm (This Is Not a Test #2)

This Is Not a Test is a novel written by Canadian author Courtney Summers. It was first published on June 19, 2012 by St. Martin's Press. Summers reacquired the publishing rights in 2024 and a revised and expanded definitive edition of the novel, including the sequel novella, Please Remain Calm was republished January 13th, 2026 by Bindery Books.

The novel takes place in a fictional Canadian town called Cortege, during the beginning of a zombie apocalypse. This Is Not a Test follows Sloane Price, a suicidal and abused teen girl as she faces the mental torments of her abusive father and being abandoned by her elder sister all the while reluctantly surviving alongside five other damaged teenagers. In 2013, it made the Inky Awards Shortlist and was a nominee for Silver Inky. In 2014, it was an Ontario Library Association Forest of Reading White Pine Honour Book.

== Summary ==
Barricaded in Cortege High with five other teens while zombies try to get in, Sloane Price observes her fellow captives become more unpredictable and violent as time passes. However, they each have much more reason to live than she has.

== Characters ==
- Sloane Price – the main protagonist of the novel. She and her sister, Lily Price, were subject of their father's abuse from a young age, presumably after their mother's death. She alongside five other teenagers are barricaded in their high school, Cortege High once the apocalypse breaks. During their time sheltered at Cortege High, Sloane develops a friendship of sorts with Cary Chen and Grace Casper, as well as a sexual relationship with Rhys Moreno.
- Rhys Moreno – the narrator of the sequel novella, the main romantic interest of Sloane. Rhys is a high school senior whose locker was diagonal from Sloane's at Cortege High. According to Sloane, he was frequently surrounded by girls and smoked cigarettes frequently. He is one of the six students who shelter there after the events at the beginning of the apocalypse. Throughout the novel, he is close with Cary Chen, and often chooses his side over Trace Casper's, with whom he develops an antagonism.
- Trace Casper – the twin brother of Grace Casper. Trace is very close with his twin sister, Grace, and loved his parents. He develops an enmity with Cary Chen, blaming him for letting his parents run into an alley swarmed with the infected. He quarrels often with many of the characters and is distrustful of everyone, especially Nick Baxter and Cary.
- Grace Casper – the twin sister of Trace Casper. She was part of Cortege High's student council, and was very popular. She has a good relationship with her family, and had many friends. After the death of their parents, she also blames Cary, but later begins to let it go. During her time sheltering at Cortege High, she eventually hooks up with Cary, and develops a friendship of sorts with Sloane. Grace is a very kind and compassionate person, being the only one who actively tries to comfort Harrison, and is continually kind and diplomatic. Sloane describes her as pretty and genuine.
- Cary Chen – acts as the group leader. He sold pot to Lily Price, and was generally uncaring in his academic studies. Cary takes on the role as leader for the six teenagers, and is highly responsible for their arrival at Cortege High. Cary has an enmity with Trace Casper throughout the book, due to the events which lead to Trace and Grace's parents' deaths. Although at first Grace agrees with her brother, she begins to forgive him and they share a sexual encounter.
- Harrison – the youngest of the group. Many call him a cry-baby or a wimp, and he is very unhelpful and naive. Only Grace and eventually Trace show him compassion, and he is generally seen as a nuisance. He realises that he has not done anything with his life, and believes his existence to be unimportant.

== Themes ==
Themes explored in This Is Not a Test involve depression, survival, betrayal, and death. Although its premise primarily revolves around a zombie apocalypse, this is only a framing device used to explore themes of humanity’s perseverance and the long-lasting emotional damages inflicted by familial abuse. Instead of action, This Is Not a Test explores the boundaries of the human mind, as well as humanity’s innate desperation and reluctance to survive.

== Reception ==
Publishers Weekly stated that Summers' book is "The Breakfast Club meets George Romero..." and listing it as one of its week of June 17, 2012 picks. It was also one of Kirkus' New & Notable Books for Teens for June 2012. In 2013, it was among the Silver Inky Shortlist, ALA/YALSA Top Ten Quick Pick for Reluctant Readers, and ALA/YALSA Best Fiction for Young Adults. The next year, it was a 2014 OLA White Pine Honour Book

== Republication ==
In 2024, Summers reacquired the publishing rights to This is Not a Test. A new edition of the book, This is Not a Test: The Definitive Edition with Please Remain Calm was released by The Inky Phoenix imprint of Bindery Books on January 13th, 2026. This edition features revised and expanded text.

== Film adaptation ==
Filming on a film adaption took place in 2025 in Ontario, Canada with a cast led by Olivia Holt, Froy Gutierrez, Corteon Moore, and Luke MacFarlane.
