= Dorothy and Thomas Hoobler =

Dorothy Hoobler and Thomas Hoobler were co-authors of more than 100 books. They were best known for their American Family Album series published by Oxford University Press. They also wrote Are You Prepared for the Storm of Love Making? Letters of Love and Lust from the White House published by Simon & Schuster in 2024.

Thomas Hoobler (June 12, 1942 – February 22, 2025) was a graduate of the University of Notre Dame, where he studied English, and attended the Iowa Writers' Workshop. His wife Dorothy Hoobler survives him.
