= The Walls Around Us =

2015 young adult novel by Nova Ren Suma

- Author: Nova Ren Suma
- Language: English
- Genre: Young adult fiction
- Published: 2015
- Publisher: Algonquin Books
- Publication place: United States
- Media type: Print (hardback, paperback), e-book, audiobook
- ISBN: 1616203722

The Walls Around Us is a 2015 young adult novel by Nova Ren Suma, which became the number one best selling for 2015 according to The New York Times. First published in March 2015 through Algonquin Young Readers, it centers on three young women, two of whom are held in a prison accused of separate murders, and a third that is tied to both accused murderers. A paperback edition of the book was released in March, 2016.

== Synopsis ==
The book is told through the alternating viewpoints of the ballerina Violet and Amber, who is accused of murdering her stepfather. While both viewpoints are interwoven, Amber's viewpoint takes place before Violet's.

=== Amber (past) ===
Amber has been sent to the juvenile detention center for supposedly murdering her stepfather. On one evening several girls attempt to flee the prison, during which time Amber has a paranormal experience, through which she meets Violet. Despite having the opportunity to flee, Amber chooses to remain at the prison but is put in solitary confinement after she accidentally assaults a guard.

Soon after Orianna, who is accused of having murdered two of her fellow ballerinas, arrives at the prison and is assigned to Amber's room. Amber recognizes that Orianna is a genuinely good person, unlike most of the girls in the prison. Orianna draws a picture of Violet and Amber recognizes her, but tells Orianna that she doesn't know how. Amber meets with legal professionals to possibly reduce her sentence, which is set well into adulthood.

At some point prior to the present day all of the girls from the prison, including Amber and Orianna, are killed.

=== Violet (present) ===
Violet, a fellow ballerina, has been accepted to Juilliard to study ballet. After her final performance she receives a bouquet of bloody flowers, which rattles her. She decides to go visit the prison with her friend Sarabeth, Orianna's boyfriend Miles, and her boyfriend Tommy. Miles takes this opportunity to lock Violet in Orianna's old cell, as he believes that Violet was the true murderer. During this time she sees Amber's ghost, which frightens her into fleeing the prison.

Violet is later visited by Orianna's ghost, who asks for an apology that Violet does not give. Violet describes the night of the murders of the two ballerinas, and it is revealed that Violet was the killer. She fell unconscious after the murders, but upon awakening blames Orianna for them. At the prison, in current time, the ghost of Orianna has dug a hole in the ground. Violet dies, and she falls into it.

It is eventually revealed that Amber poisoned the girls' peas and that the murdered prisoners can return to the living world if somebody dies, claiming their guilt. Violet's death claims Orianna's guilt, and Orianna comes back to life, going on to live as Violet was planning to.

== Background ==
Suma began writing The Walls Around Us after reaching a period of self-doubt where she questioned "everything about my writing and my career as a YA author and feeling unsteady about what to do next". While writing the book she wrote the viewpoints of Violet and Amber separately, finishing one point first and then returning to write second point of view, after which she spliced the two stories into one book. Suma did not want to create likeable characters, instead considering less likeable ones to be more interesting. For the book Suma drew upon her past experiences studying dance at small-town dance schools.

== Reception ==
Critical reception for The Walls Around Us has been positive. The New York Times gave a favorable review for The Walls Around Us, which they felt was "intricately plotted" and contained "evocative language". The Chicago Tribune also praised the book, writing "Nova Ren Suma's prose hums with such power and fury that when the explosions do happen, they seem unavoidable. Even if readers puzzle a bit over the plot specifics, they will find much here that is satisfying, disturbing and hard to forget."
