= Levi Copestake =

English footballer

Personal information
- Date of birth: 1886
- Place of birth: Kiveton Park, England
- Date of death: 1968 (aged 81–82)
- Position: Outside left

Youth career
- 1903–1905: Kiveton Park

Senior career*
Years	Team	Apps	(Gls)
1905–1906	Worksop		
1905–1906	Blackpool	19	(1)
1907	Bristol City	2	(1)
- Exeter City
1910–1912	Bristol City	41	(5)
- * Club domestic league appearances and goals

Levi Copestake was an English professional footballer. An outside left, he played in the Football League for Blackpool and Bristol City.
