= Kathryn Miller Haines =

American novelist and actor

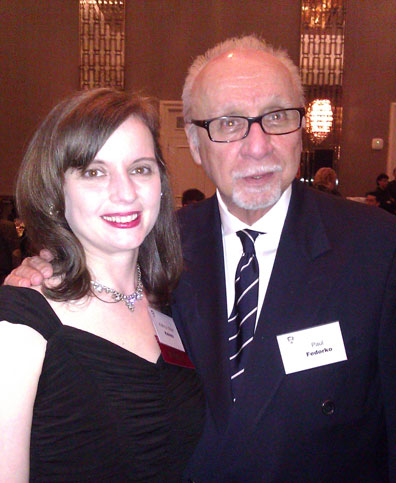
- Haines at the Edgar Awards, 2012
- Education: University of Pittsburgh
- Occupations: Novelist; actor
- Website: www.kathrynmillerhaines.com

Kathryn Miller Haines is an American novelist and actor, known for her Rosie Winter series of mystery novels. Haines moved to Pittsburgh in 1994, where she attended the University of Pittsburgh for her Master's degree. She has served as the associate director of the Center for American Music at the University of Pittsburgh and, in 2012, was nominated for an Edgar Award for her book The Girl Is Murder.

== Bibliography ==
=== Rosie Winter ===
1. The War Against Miss Winter (2007)
2. The Winter of Her Discontent (2008)
3. Winter in June (2009)
4. When Winter Returns (2010)

=== The Girl is Murder ===
1. The Girl is Murder (2011)
2. The Girl is Trouble (2012)

=== Stand Alone ===
1. The Girl from Yesterday (2017)

=== Plays ===
- Sibling Rivalry (2013)
