= Counterfeit Son =

2000 novel by Elaine Marie Alphin

- Author: Elaine Marie Alphin
- Publication date: 2000

Counterfeit Son is a 2000 novel by Elaine Marie Alphin and was written for young adults. It received a 2001 Edgar Award from the Mystery Writers of America for Best Young Adult Mystery. It is a psychological thriller.

== Plot ==
Cameron Miller is 14. He has been physically and sexually abused by his father all his life. His "Pop", Hank, is a serial killer who preys on young boys, murdering more than 20 over the years. Hank kept newspaper cuttings of each of the boys in a filing cabinet in the cellar where he locked Cameron while he tortured and killed the boys. Cameron studied the cuttings and dreams of being one particular boy whose parents have sailboats on a lake. When "Pop" dies in a gunfight with police, Cameron takes on the identity of this boy, Neil Lacey, a victim who was abducted and murdered six years earlier.

The Lacey parents accept "Neil" into their home with few questions, but he lives in fear that he will make a serious mistake through not knowing Neil's likes and dislikes and that dental records and suspicious Detective Simmons will expose him. His eight-year-old brother Stevie is put out by his return and his younger sister Diana is convinced he's not Neil, but much prefers him to her memories of her real brother. Alphin describes the years of sexual and physical abuse that Cameron endured at the hands of his father, but never in graphic detail. Cameron is always expecting punishment from his new "parents", yet finds kindness and love instead.

When Cougar, "Pop's" former accomplice newly freed from prison, finds Cameron and threatens him with exposure, Cameron tries to tell his "father" the truth. In the novel's climax, Stevie is kidnapped and Cameron risks everything to save him.
