= Raised by Wolves (book series) =

Young adult fantasy novel series by Jennifer Lynn Barnes

Raised by Wolves is a young adult fantasy novel series by Jennifer Lynn Barnes, published by EgmontUSA. The series consists of four books: Raised by Wolves (2010), Sweet Sixteen (2015), Trial by Fire (2011), and Take by Storm (2012).

== Raised by Wolves ==
Raised by Wolves was published June 8, 2010.

The book received a positive review from Booklist and a mixed review from Kirkus.

In 2010, Raise by Wolves was nominated for the Romantic Times Reviewers' Choice Award for Best Young Adult Paranormal/Fantasy Novel.

== Sweet Sixteen ==
Sweet Sixteen is a short story that takes place in the timeline between Raised by Wolves and Trial by Fire. It was published June 12, 2015.

== Trial by Fire ==
Trial by Fire was published June 14, 2011.

== Taken by Storm ==
Taken by Storm was published May 22, 2012.
