= Elaine M. Alphin =

American novelist (1955–2014)

- Born: Elaine Marie Bonilla; October 30, 1955 San Francisco, California, U.S.
- Died: August 19, 2014 (aged 58) Glenrock, Wyoming, U.S.
- Occupation: Author
- Notable awards: Edgar Allan Poe Award for Best Young Adult Novel (2001)
- Spouse: Arthur B. Alphin (m. 1982)

Elaine Marie Alphin (née Bonilla; October 30, 1955 – August 19, 2014) was an American author of more than thirty books for children and young adults.

Although she specialized in fiction, she has published many non-fiction titles, including biographies of Davy Crockett, Louis Pasteur, Dwight Eisenhower, and John Paul Jones, which she co-wrote with her husband Arthur Alphin (as part of Lerner Publishing's History Maker Biographies series). She was noted for writing historical fiction and psychological thrillers. Several of her novels dealt with controversial topics such as serial killers, pedophiles, child abuse, homosexuality, murder, and suicide.

Alphin was a subject of the Contemporary Authors series, a collection of biographies published by Thomson Gale in 2007.

== Last years ==
In August 2011, Alphin suffered a stroke. Her last book was An Unspeakable Crime: The Prosecution and Persecution of Leo Frank (2010). She died at her home in Glenrock, Wyoming on August 19, 2014, aged 58. She was interred at Sunset Hills Cemetery in Bozeman, Montana.

== Themes ==
=== Ghosts ===
Several of Alphin's novels are ghost stories. Two, Ghost Cadet and Ghost Soldier, deal with ghosts of child-soldiers from the American Civil War who require help from present-day children to achieve their final rest. Ghost Cadet has been Alphin's most successful book to date, going through several editions in both hardback and paperback. The book's popularity with young readers prompted her publishers to ask for a companion novel – Ghost Soldier. In Tournament of Time, one of her early novels, an American school girl living in England befriends the ghosts of two medieval princes, allegedly murdered by Richard III in the Tower of London, and battles the 500-year-old ghost of their murderer. The story has been much praised for its historical accuracy and attention to detail, as well as its thrilling denouement.

=== Child abuse ===
Child abuse and its aftermath is a major theme of Counterfeit Son. It also features prominently in Picture Perfect and, to a lesser extent, The Perfect Shot.

== Books ==
- The Ghost Cadet, Henry Holt (New York, NY), 1991.
- The Proving Ground, Henry Holt (New York, NY), 1992.
- 101 Bible Puzzles, Standard, 1993.
- Tournament of Time, Bluegrass Books, 1994.
- Rainy Day/Sunny Day/Any Day Activities, Concordia (St. Louis, MO), 1994.
- A Bear for Miguel, pictures by Joan Sandin, HarperCollins (New York, NY), 1996.
- Counterfeit Son, Harcourt (San Diego, CA), 2000.
- Creating Characters Kids Will Love, Writer's Digest Books (Cincinnati, OH), 2000.
- Ghost Soldier, Henry Holt (New York, NY), 2001.
- Around the World in 1500, Benchmark Books (New York, NY), 2001.
- Simon Says, Harcourt (San Diego, CA), 2002.
- Germ Hunter: A Story about Louis Pasteur, Carolrhoda Books (Minneapolis, MN), 2002.
- Picture Perfect, Carolrhoda Books (Minneapolis, MN), 2003.
- Davy Crockett, Lerner (Minneapolis, MN), 2003.
- Dwight D. Eisenhower, Lerner (Minneapolis, MN), 2004. (With husband, Arthur B. Alphin)
- Dinosaur Hunter, HarperCollins (New York, NY), 2004.
- The Perfect Shot, Carolrhoda Books (Minneapolis, MN), 2005
- An Unspeakable Crime: The Prosecution and Persecution of Leo Frank (2010).

== Awards ==
Alphin's novels have been placed on many state-sponsored reading lists, as well as receiving nominations for various writing awards. In 2001 her novel Counterfeit Son won the Edgar Award for Best Young Adult Novel. Other major awards include:

- 2011 Carter G. Woodson Book Award for An Unspeakable Crime: The Prosecution and Persecution of Leo Frank
- 2006 Foreword Book of the Year Gold Medal for Young Adult Fiction for The Perfect Shot
- 2006 Bank Street College Teen Selection for The Perfect Shot
- 2005 VOYA Top Shelf Fiction Award for The Perfect Shot
- 2004 Bank Street College Children's Selection for I Have Not Yet Begun To Fight
- 2004 Young Hoosier Book Award for Ghost Soldier
- 2003 New Jersey Library Association Pick of the Decade Selection for A Bear for Miguel
- 2003 Edgar Allan Poe Nomination for Best Juvenile Mystery for Ghost Soldier
- 2003 Bank Street College Children's Selection for Germ Hunter
- 2003 VOYA Top Shelf Fiction Award for Picture Perfect
- 2003 Oppenheim Toy Portfolio Gold Award for "Dinosaur Hunter"
- 2002 Society of Midland Authors Children's Fiction Award for Ghost Soldier
- 2001 Edgar Award for Counterfeit Son
- 2000 Indianapolis Christian University International Washington Irving Literary Award for Outstanding Lifetime Achievement in Writing
- 1995 Virginia State Reading Association Award for Ghost Cadet
