= Copestake Peak =

Mountain in South Georgia

Copestake Peak (54°15′S 36°46′W) is a peak rising to 655 metres (2,150 ft) on the south side of Neumayer Glacier, South Georgia. It was named by the UK Antarctic Place-Names Committee for Paul Goodall-Copestake, who was British Antarctic Survey biological assistant at Grytviken, 1980–82, and Station Commander at Bird Island, 1982–83.
