= Kate White (writer) =

American journalist

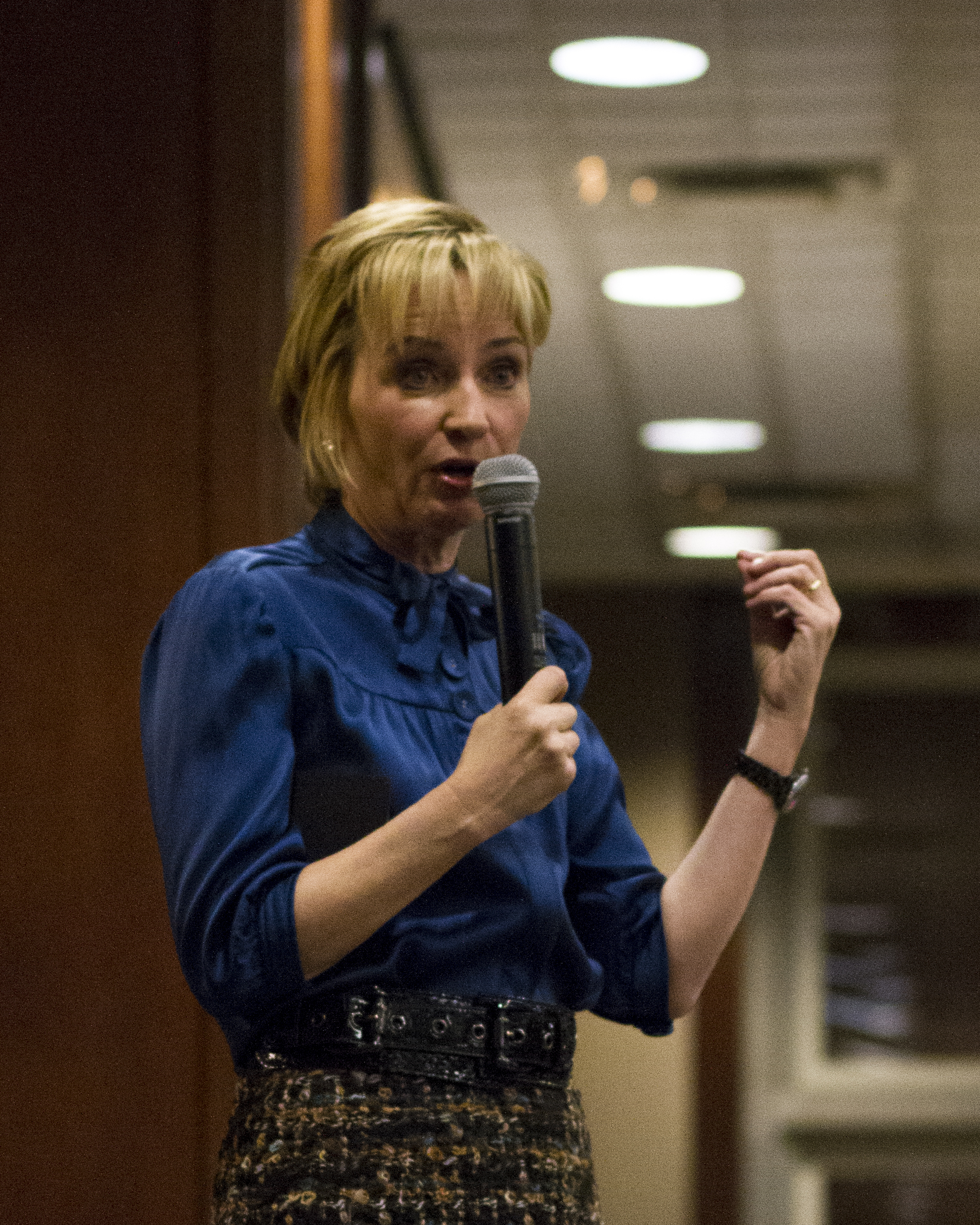
- Kate White speaks at the University of Missouri in March 2014.
- Born: Glens Falls, New York, U.S.
- Education: Union College (BA)
- Occupations: Writer, public speaker
- Known for: Author, former editor-in-chief of Cosmopolitan
- Children: 2

Kate White is an American author, former magazine editor, and speaker. From 1998 to 2012, she served as the editor-in-chief of Cosmopolitan and left to concentrate full time on writing suspense fiction. She is the New York TImes Bestselling author of nineteen novels: eight books in the Bailey Weggins mystery series, including Such a Perfect Wife (May 2019), which was nominated for an International Thriller Writer’s Award, and eleven stand-alone psychological thrillers, including, most recently, I Came Back for You (March 2026). White has also written five non-fiction books with business advice for women, including The Gutsy Girl Handbook: Your Manifesto for Success, based on her groundbreaking bestseller Why Good Girls Don’t Get Ahead but Gutsy Girls Do, and I Shouldn't Be Telling You This: How to Ask for the Money, Snag the Promotion, and Create the Career You Deserve. Her books have appeared on the New York Times, Wall Street Journal, and USA Today best seller lists and have been published in thirteen countries. She is also the editor of The Mystery Writers of America Cookbook (March 2015). In June 2022 White was awarded an honorary doctorate of letters by Union College.

== Early life and education ==
White was born in Glens Falls, New York and attended Union College in Schenectady, New York. She graduated in 1972 with a BA in English. In June 2022 she gave the commencement address at Union and was named an honorary doctor of letters by the college.

== Career in magazine industry ==
White began her career in the magazine industry after winning Glamour's “Top Ten College Women” contest, for which she appeared on the cover and received a position as an editorial assistant at the magazine. During her time at Glamour, White worked her way up to become a feature writer and columnist. She went on to hold positions at other national magazines, including Mademoiselle, before becoming editor-in-chief of Child. White later served as editor-in-chief for Working Woman, McCall's, and Redbook, which she headed from 1994 to 1998.

=== Cosmopolitan ===
In 1998, White was appointed editor-in-chief of Cosmopolitan magazine. During her 14-year tenure, White increased Cosmopolitan's monthly circulation by more than 700,000 readers, with the magazine's circulation peaking at over three million readers in 2012. In September 2012, White announced her intention to leave her position at Cosmopolitan before the end of the year in order to focus on her work as an author and speaker.

== Writing career ==
=== Fiction ===
As of 2002, White has published eight mystery novels with the lead protagonist Bailey Weggins, a New York City true crime writer. The first book in the series, If Looks Could Kill (2002), was chosen by Kelly Ripa for her book club and reached number 10 on the New York Times Best Seller list. Entertainment Weekly reviewed the book positively and described it as "[w]inningly salacious." The latest Bailey Weggins mystery is titled Such a Perfect Wife (May 2019). Publishers Weekly called it “highly entertaining". It was nominated for an International Thriller Writers Award.

In addition to the Bailey Weggins mysteries, White has written eleven stand-alone psychological thrillers: Hush (2010); The Sixes (2011); Eyes on You (2014); The Wrong Man (2015); The Secrets You Keep (2017); Have You Seen Me? (2020); The Fiancée (2021); The Second Husband (2022); Between Two Strangers (2023); The Last Time She Saw Him (2024); I Came Back For You (2026).

=== Non-fiction ===
White has also written five non-fiction books with career advice for women in business: including: Why Good Girls Don't Get Ahead... But Gutsy Girls Do: Nine Secrets Every Career Woman Must Know (1995), 9 Secrets of Women Who Get Everything They Want (1998), and I Shouldn't Be Telling You This: How to Ask for the Money, Snag the Promotion, and Create the Career You Deserve (2012).

== Personal life ==
White is married to former news anchorman Brad Holbrook, with whom she has two children.

== Bibliography ==
=== Bailey Weggins mysteries ===
1. If Looks Could Kill (2002) Warner Books, ISBN 0446530239
2. A Body to Die For (2003) Warner Books, ISBN 978-0446531481
3. ‘Til Death Do Us Part (2004) Warner Books, ISBN 978-0446531757
4. Over Her Dead Body (2005) Grand Central Publishing, ISBN 978-0446531764
5. Lethally Blond (2007) Warner Books, ISBN 978-0446577953
6. So Pretty It Hurts (2012) Harper, ISBN 978-0061576607
7. Even If It Kills Her (2017) Harper
8. Such a Perfect Wife (2019) Harper, ISBN 978-0062747495

=== Other fiction ===
- Hush (2010) Harper, ISBN 978-0061576614
- The Sixes (2011) Harper, ISBN 978-0061576621
- Eyes on You (2014) Harper, ISBN 978-0061576638
- The Wrong Man (2015) Harper, ISBN 978-0062350664
- The Secrets You Keep (2017) Harper, ISBN 978-0062448866
- Have You Seen Me? (2020) Harper, ISBN 978-0062972088
- The Fiancée (2021) Harper, ISBN 978-0062945419
- The Second Husband (2022) Harper, ISBN 978-0062945457
- Between Two Strangers (2023) Harper, ISBN 978-0063247369
- The Last Time She Saw Him (2024) Harper, ISBN 9780063247390
- I Came Back For You (2026) Thomas & Mercer, ISBN 978-1-6625-3399-0

=== Non-fiction ===
- Why Good Girls Don't Get Ahead... But Gutsy Girls Do: Nine Secrets Every Career Woman Must Know (1995) Grand Central Publishing, ISBN 978-0446518277
- 9 Secrets of Women Who Get Everything They Want (1998) Crown Archetype, ISBN 978-0312017972
- You on Top: Smart, Sexy Skills Every Woman Needs to Set the World on Fire (2007) Grand Central Publishing, ISBN 978-0446695527
- I Shouldn't Be Telling You This: How Ask for the Money, Snag the Promotion, and Create the Career You Deserve) (2012) HarperBusiness, ISBN 978-0062122124
- The Gutsy Girl Handbook: Your Manifesto for Success (2019) Grand Central Publishing, ISBN 978-1538711576
