= The Silence of Murder =

2011 book by Dandi Daley Mackall

- First edition
- Author: Dandi Daley Mackall
- Genre: Realistic fiction, Young adult, Crime fiction
- Published: 2011
- Publisher: Knopf Doubleday Publishing Group
- Pages: 336
- Awards: Edgar Award for Best Young Adult (2012)
- ISBN: 978-0-375-86896-2
- Website: The Silence of Murder

The Silence of Murder is a mystery novel for teen readers written by American author Dandi Daley Mackall and published by Knopf Doubleday Publishing Group on October 11, 2011. The book won the Edgar Award for Best Young Adult in 2012.

The story centers on the murder of John Johnson, a beloved small-town high school teacher and baseball coach. The only suspect is Jeremy Long, a student at the school who has been voluntarily mute for almost a decade. Jeremy's younger sister Hope believes her brother is not responsible for the crime, and sets out to prove his innocence and find the true killer.
