= Capstick, Nova Scotia =

Community in Nova Scotia, Canada

Coordinates: 46°59′46″N 60°30′44″W

Capstick in Nova Scotia

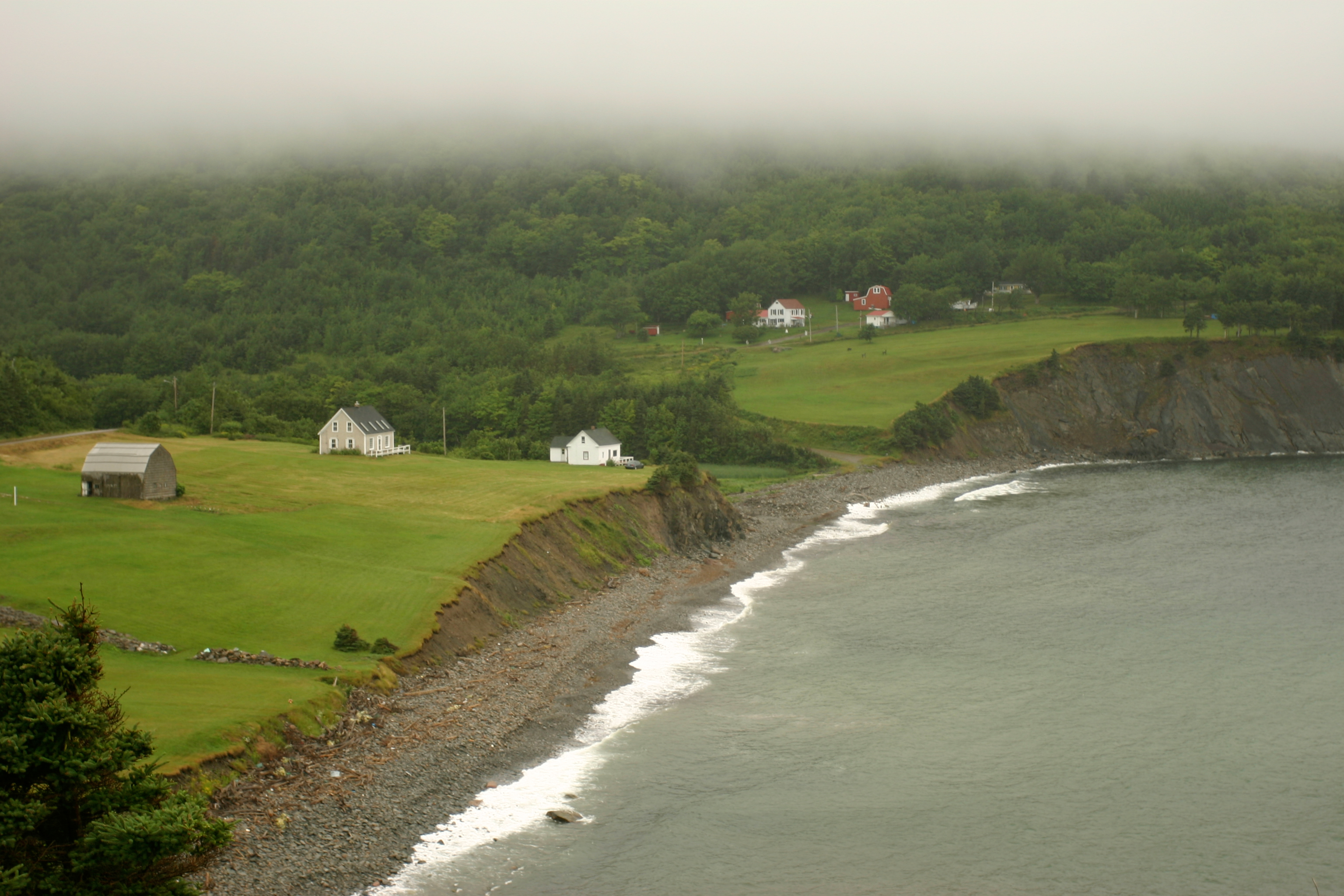
Capstick, Nova Scotia

Capstick is a community in the Canadian province of Nova Scotia, located in Victoria County on Cape Breton Island. One of the first settlers there was William Capstick, who obtained a land grant in the area in 1843.
