= Dandi Daley Mackall =

American writer

- Occupation: Author
- Website: www.dandibooks.com

Dandi Daley Mackall is an American author with around 500 of her works published for adults and children. Some of her works are the Winnie the Horse Gentler series and the Flipside Stories, The Silence of Murder, and With Love, Wherever You Are, a novel based on the stories and letters of her parents, Army doctor and Army nurse in World War II, as well as many others. She collaborated with Sigmund Brouwer and Melody Carlson to take part in creating the Degrees of Guilt series and then with Jeff Nesbit and Melody Carlson in the Degrees of Betrayal series. Other animal series include Backyard Horses, Starlight Animal Rescue, Bob the Horse, and I Can Read series. Her bestselling devotional books include Three Wise Women: 40 Devotions Celebrating Advent with Mary, Elizabeth, and Anna and Women Who Followed Jesus: 40 Devotions on the Journey to Easter.

== Biography ==
Mackall started her writing career when at ten years of age she entered and won her first writing contest in 1959. Her paper was titled "Why I Want to be Batboy for the Kansas City A's". Since then, she has published over 450 books for adults, teens, and children. She now lives with her husband, Joe, in Ohio. They have three children: Jen, Katy, and Dan. Mackall continues to appear on radio broadcasts, and has made several appearances on TV as well.

The Silence of Murder won the Edgar Award for Best Young Adult Mystery of 2012. Larger-Than-Life Lara was a finalist for the William Allen White Award, Kentucky Bluegrass Award, and the Delaware Diamond. Ms. Mackall won the Distinguished Alumni Award from the University of Missouri and the Helen Keating Ott Award for Distinguished Contribution to Children's Literature. Her novel, My Boyfriends' Dogs, was turned into a Hallmark movie and became the most-watched original Hallmark movie of 2014.

== Bibliography ==
=== Children's books ===
1. A Girl Named Dan
2. Rudy Rides the Rails
3. The Legend of Ohio
4. Dandelion Rhymes
5. Seeing Stars
6. In the Beginning
7. Who's a Goblin?
8. Are We There Yet?
9. Silent Dreams
10. First Day
11. Made For A Purpose
12. Off To Plymouth Rock!
13. Journey, Easter Journey!
14. I'm Not Afraid Series
15. A Friend From Galilee
16. This is the Lunch that Jesus Served
17. My Favorite Verses Series
18. Must Be Halloween
19. Easter is for Me
20. Who'll Light the Chanukah Candles?
21. Joseph King of Dreams Christmas Picture Books
22. The Shepherd's Christmas Story

=== Teen's books ===
1. Crazy In Love
2. Larger Than-Life Lara
3. Eva Underground
4. Our Marriage
5. Love Rules
6. Maggie's Story
7. Winnie the Horse Gentler Series
8. Horsefeathers!
9. Starlight Animal Rescue
10. Blog On!
11. Sierra's Story: Degrees of Betrayal
12. Kyra's Story: Degrees of Guilt
13. Career Skills Series
14. Horse Files
15. My Boyfriend's Dogs
16. Backyard Horses
17. The Silence of Murder

The Secrets of Tree Taylor

=== Adult's books ===
With Love, Wherever You Are, a Novel Maggie Love Rules

1. Kindred Sisters
2. Kids Say The Best Things About Life
3. Kids Say The Best Things About God
4. Kids Are Still Saying the Darndest Things
5. Kids Say the Greatest Things about God
6. Kids Say the Cutest Things About Moms
7. Kids Say the Cutest Things About Dads
8. Why I Believe in God
9. What Children Know About Angels
10. When the Answer Is No
11. Just One of Me
12. The Blessing Is in the Doing
13. Kids' Rules for Life
14. 101 Ways to Talk to God
15. God Created Me!
16. Three Wise Women: 40 Devotions Celebrating Advent with Mary, Elizabeth, and Anna
17. Women Who Followed Jesus: 40 Devotions on the Journey to Easter

== Publishers ==
- Prentice-Hall
- Simon & Schuster
- Dutton/Penguin-Putnam
- HarperCollins
- Harcourt
- Random House/WaterBrook
- DreamWorks
- Tyndale House
- Tommy Nelson
- Standard Publishing
- Jossey-Bass
- Broadman
- Shaw
- Concordia Publishing House
- William B. Eerdmans Publishing Company
- Honor Books
- Augsburg-Fortress
- Mc-Graw-Hill/Children's Specialty
- Landoll's
- Prima/St. Martin's
- Ferguson
- John Wiley & Sons
- Sourcebooks
- Disney
- Warner Brothers
- Hanna Barbera
