= A Madness So Discreet =

Award winning young adult novel

- First edition
- Author: Mindy McGinnis
- Genre: Historical fiction, Young adult, Mystery
- Published: 2015
- Publisher: Katherine Tegen Books
- Pages: 376
- Awards: Edgar Award for Best Young Adult (2016)
- ISBN: 978-0-062-32086-5
- Website: A Madness So Discreet

A Madness So Discreet is a mystery novel written by Mindy McGinnis, published by Katherine Tegen Books (a subsidiary of HarperCollins) on 6 October 2016. It won the Edgar Award for Best Young Adult in 2016.

Set in Boston, and later Ohio, the novel is told from the point of view of Grace Mae, a young woman from a prominent family forced into an insane asylum to cover up her out of wedlock pregnancy. After befriending a fellow inmate who notices the sharpness of her mind Grace manages to escape and moves to Ohio where she takes up a life solving crime.

== Plot ==
Grace Mae, a young woman from a prominent Boston family, has been sent to reside in the Wayburne Lunatic Asylum of Boston for the length of her illegitimate pregnancy. Despite not talking she is deemed one of the more gentle patients until she stabs a doctor who had been touching her. As a punishment Grace is wrapped in steaming hot sheets which cause her to miscarry and afterwards she is sent to the basement with the worst of the patients. While there she meets Dr. Thornhollow, a man who performs lobotomies, and begs him to perform one on her so that she can forget her time in the asylum and that her pregnancy was caused by her father raping her. Thornhollow declines, but fakes a lobotomy after recognizing her observation skills are assets in his hobby of offender profiling murderers. The asylum to fake Grace's death in order to protect themselves from the wrath of her father.

Thornhollow takes Grace to a more progressive asylum in Ohio where Grace continues to play the part of a mute. At the asylum Grace befriends two fellow patients, Nelly, an Irish born working girl suffering from late stage syphilis, and Lizzie, who seems normal aside from the fact that she speaks to String, an imaginary creature who sits on her shoulder and seems able to read people's inner thoughts and predict the future. Grace also begins to enjoy her work with Thornhollow and the two eventually discover that there is a serial killer on the loose who appears to be raping and murdering women. Thornhollow suspects that the man is a doctor who is unable to sustain an erection and has difficulty with women. Thornhollow and Grace begin to look for a doctor but find no one who fits their description. The case grows cold through a lack of murders and through Grace's disinterest after Nelly commits suicide.

Grace's interest in the case is renewed after she realizes that Thornhollow is an only son under pressure to conceive heirs and begins to wonder if their murderer is not under the same pressure. By complete coincidence Grace sneaks into town to buy perfume for Lizzie only to meet Mr. Beaton, a chemist who fits every clue they have for their suspected killer. Grace tells Thornhollow who agrees Beaton is likely their killer but warns Grace that the police will not believe them. Unwilling to let another woman be victimized Grace returns to collect her perfume, offering Beaton the perfect opportunity to kill her, only to murder him. Thornhollow immediately realizes Grace is the murderer when called to the body but does not reveal her involvement to the police.

Since her escape, Grace had written to her younger sister Alice pretending to be a fairy. In one of the letters she receives in return she realizes her father has begun grooming her sister. Desperate to protect Alice she begs Thornhollow to help her frame her father for Beaton's murders, and also enlists Lizzie to help her.

Grace's father, Senator Mae, is forced to stand trial where numerous women testify that he raped them. Among them is Lizzie, who claims that Mae raped her during his visit to the Ohio asylum and also threatened to murder her. Lizzie testifies using intimate knowledge given to her by Grace. Thornhollow also testifies under his capacity as an expert in phrenology. At the last minute however Thornhollow suggests that Mae is insane, saving his life but condemning him to an insane asylum. Grace visits her father before he is sentenced but while he threatens her she tells him that no one will believe she is alive as he has now been deemed criminally insane.

Grace returns to the institution and learns that her sister is under the care of her loving aunt. She and Thornhollow continue to investigate murders.

== Reviews ==
"A dark study of the effects of power in the wrong hands, buoyed by a tenacious heroine and her colorful companions." -Kirkus Reviews

"Though told from Grace’s perspective, the story gives insight into many characters, leaving none of them wholly good or wholly evil. While some of the time shifts are rather abrupt and a few plot twists could use fleshing out, overall, this frank historical thriller features flawed, yet sympathetic, characters and a unique setting." — Snow Wildsmith

“A bountiful buffet of twisted, dark intrigue. While others are writing about relatively ‘normal’ heroes and heroines, McGinnis takes the less-traveled route to bring us a heroine damaged physically and mentally, and to the far reaches of her soul. McGinnis can surely tell a story.” -USA Today
