= The Inheritance Games =

Young adult novel series by Jennifer Lynn Barnes

- The Inheritance Games (2020); The Hawthorne Legacy (2021); The Final Gambit (2022); Games Untold ( 2024 )
- Author: Jennifer Lynn Barnes
- Country: United States
- Language: English
- Publisher: Little, Brown Books for Young Readers
- Published: September 1, 2020 – present
- No. of books: 3

The Inheritance Games is a young adult novel series by author Jennifer Lynn Barnes, published by Little, Brown Books for Young Readers. The series focuses on a teenaged girl, Avery Kylie Grambs, and the Hawthorne family. It currently consists of three main books: The Inheritance Games (2020), The Hawthorne Legacy (2021), The Final Gambit (2022). Also connected to the series are a standalone book that follows the events of the main series, The Brothers Hawthorne (2023), and a short story and novella collection, Games Untold: An Inheritance Games Collection (2024). A spinoff series, The Grandest Game, currently features two books: The Grandest Game (2024) and Glorious Rivals (2025).

In The Inheritance Games, it is revealed that Avery has been chosen to inherit the fortune of deceased billionaire Tobias Hawthorne, whom she has never met or heard of. The series follows her efforts, along with those of the Hawthorne family, to uncover the truth of her inheritance.

== The Inheritance Games ==
The Inheritance Games was published on September 1, 2020. It was a New York Times and IndieBound best seller.

The book received starred reviews from Publishers Weekly and Kirkus Reviews, as well as positive reviews from Booklist and School Library Journal and a mixed review from the Bulletin of the Center for Children's Books.

In 2021, the book won the Teen Buckeye Book Award and was nominated for the Edgar Award for Young Adult, the Goodreads Choice Award for Young Adult, and YALSA's Teen's Top Ten. It was also selected for YALSA's Quick Picks for Reluctant Young Adult Readers and Best Fiction for Young Adults and Kirkus Reviews' Best Books of 2020.

== The Hawthorne Legacy ==
The Hawthorne Legacy was published on September 7, 2021. The Hawthorne Legacy follows the events of "The Inheritance Games" where Avery Kylie Grambs must find the assumed dead Tobias Hawthorne The Second; Tobias Hawthorne's son. In the meantime Avery has to figure out who her allies are, and who is against her.

The book received positive reviews from Kirkus Reviews and School Library Journal.

In 2021, it was a finalist for a Goodreads Choice Award for Young Adult Fiction.

== The Final Gambit ==
The Final Gambit was published on August 30, 2022.

== The Brothers Hawthorne ==
The Brothers Hawthorne was published on August 29, 2023.

== Games Untold: An Inheritance Games Collection ==
Games Untold: An Inheritance Games Collection was published on November 12, 2024.

== Accolades ==
Accolades for The Inheritance Games series
Book	Year	Award	Result	Ref.
The Inheritance Games	2021	Edgar Award for Young Adult	Nominee	
The Inheritance Games	2021	Teen Buckeye Book Award	Winner	
The Inheritance Games	2021	YALSA's Teens' Top Ten	Nominee	
The Inheritance Games	2021	YALSA's Quick Picks for Reluctant Young Adult Readers	Selection	
The Inheritance Games	2021	YALSA's Best Fiction for Young Adults	Selection	
The Inheritance Games	2020	Goodreads Choice Award for Young Adult Fiction	Nominee	
The Inheritance Games	2020	Kirkus Reviews' Best Books of 2020	Selection	
The Hawthorne Legacy	2021	Goodreads Choice Award for Young Adult Fiction	Nominee	
