= Mindy McGinnis =

American writer

- Education: Otterbein University
- Occupation: Writer of young adult fiction
- Known for: A Madness So Discreet

Mindy McGinnis is an American writer of young adult fiction. Her most notable works include Be Not Far from Me (2020), Heroine (2019), The Female of the Species (2016), and A Madness So Discreet (2015).

== Personal life ==
Mindy McGinnis grew up in Ohio, a ninth-generation farmer.

She attended Otterbein University, where she studied English literature and religion, and graduated with a bachelor of arts degree.

For a time, McGinnis worked as a school librarian. She now lives in her hometown and provides her services to financially disadvantaged school districts and communities.

== Selected texts ==
=== Be Not Far from Me ===
Be Not Far from Me was published March 3, 2020 by Katherine Tegen Books. The book received starred reviews from Booklist, Voice of Youth Advocates (VOYA), School Library Journal, Kirkus, and Publishers Weekly, as well as the following accolades:

- Teen Buckeye Book Award Nominee (2021)
- American Library Association's (ALA) Top Ten Quick Picks for Reluctant Young Adult Readers (2021)
- ALA's Top Ten Best Fiction for Young Adults (2021)
- ALA's Amazing Audiobooks for Young Adults (2021)

=== Heroine ===
Heroine was published March 12, 2019 by Katherine Tegen Books. The book received starred reviews from Kirkus, School Library Journal, Voice of Youth Advocates (VOYA), Publishers Weekly, and Booklist, as well as the following accolades:

- Lincoln Award Nominee (2021)
- American Library Association's (ALA) Amazing Audiobooks for Young Adults Top Ten (2020)
- ALA's Top Ten Quick Picks for Reluctant Young Adult Readers (2020)
- ALA's Top Ten Best Fiction for Young Adults (2020)

=== The Female of the Species ===
The Female of the Species was published September 20, 2016 by Katherine Tegen Books. The book received starred reviews from Kirkus, Voice of Youth Advocates (VOYA), School Library Journal, and Booklist, as well as the following accolades:

- Lincoln Award Nominee (2020)
- American Library Association's Top Ten Best Fiction for Young Adults (2017)
- Goodreads Choice Award Nominee for Young Adult Fiction (2016)

=== A Madness So Discreet ===
A Madness So Discreet was published October 6, 2015 by Katherine Tegen Books and has received the following accolades:

- Edgar Award for Best Young Adult (2016)
- Missouri Gateway Readers Award Nominee (2017)
