= Jennifer Lynn Barnes =

American author

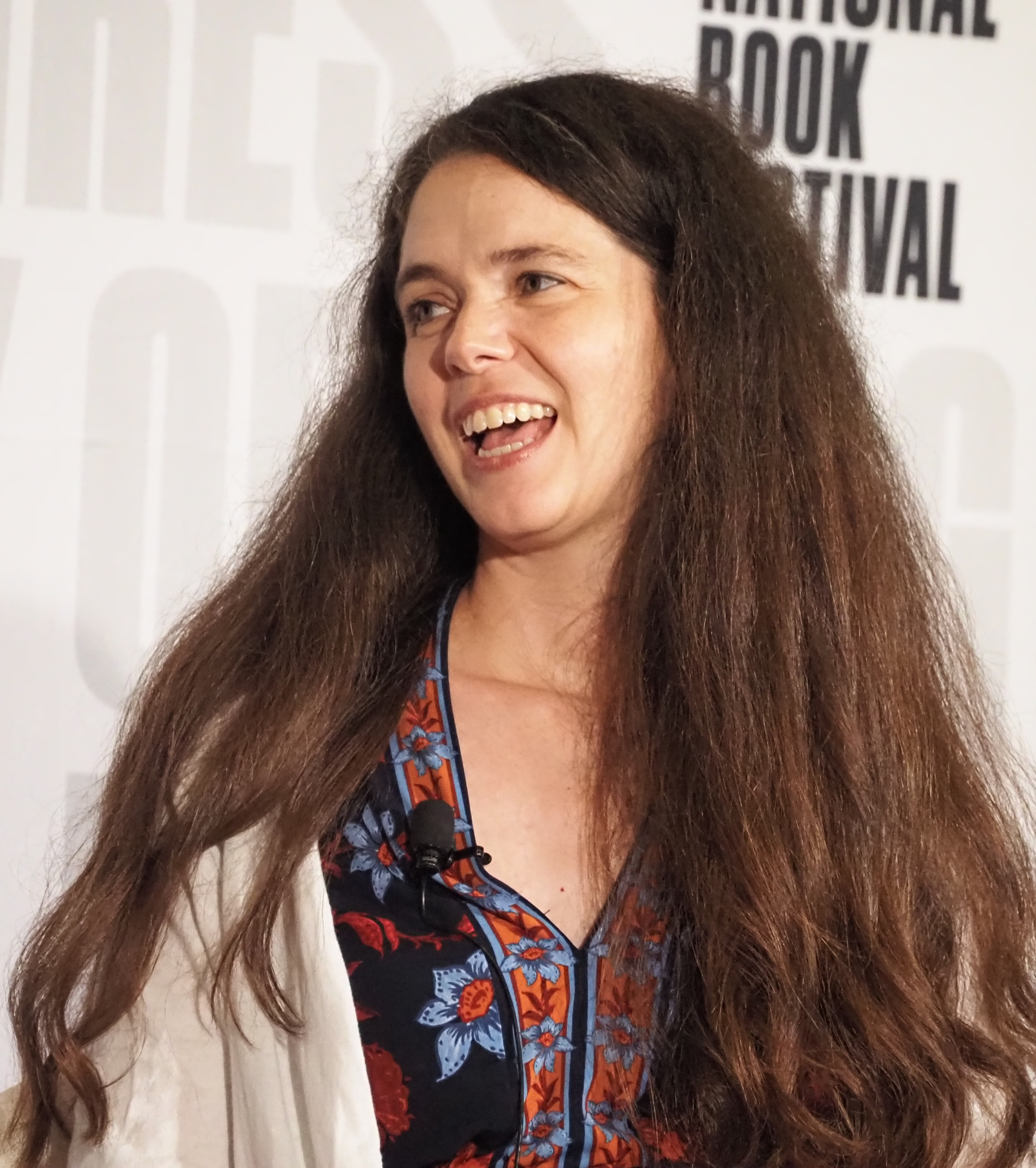
- Born: October 19, 1984 (age 42); Tulsa, Oklahoma, U.S.
- Education: Yale University (PhD)
- Occupations: Writer, author
- Years active: 2012–present
- Notable work: The Inheritance Games
- Children: 3
- Website: jenniferlynnbarnes.com

== Personal life ==
Jennifer "Jen" Lynn Barnes was born on October 19, 1984, in Tulsa, Oklahoma.

She graduated from high school in 2002, then attended Yale University, where she studied cognitive science. She graduated with a bachelor's degree from the university in 2006 and a Ph.D. in 2012.

She is married and has three sons.

== Career ==
Barnes wrote her first novel at age nineteen and sold five books while completing university.

After receiving her Ph.D. from Yale University, she conducted autism research at the University of Cambridge. She now serves as an associate professor of both psychology and professional writing at the University of Oklahoma. In 2019, she received the university's Robert Glenn Rapp Foundation Presidential Professorship. Much of her research career has focused on different aspects of human attraction to and connection with fiction. Recently, she has also been studying the psychology of fandom.

== Book series ==
=== The Inheritance Games (2020–2022) ===
The Inheritance Games is a young adult novel series, published by Little, Brown Books for Young Readers. The series currently consists of nine books: The Inheritance Games (2020), The Hawthorne Legacy (2021), The Final Gambit (2022), The Brothers Hawthorne (2023), The Grandest Game (2024), Games Untold (2024), Glorious Rivals (2025), The Same Backward As Forward (2025) and Gilded Blade (2026). It was on the New York Times and IndieBound best seller. It was nominated for the Edgar Award for Young Adult, the Goodreads Choice Award for Young Adult, and YALSA's Teen's Top Ten, and was selected for YALSA's Quick Picks for Reluctant Young Adult Readers and Best Fiction for Young Adults and Kirkus Reviews' Best Books of 2020.

Barnes wrote this series applying the psychological principle of gossip theory, the idea that fiction can fulfill a need to engage in gossip. Using what she has learned about gossip theory helped her construct a series that would hook readers completely.

The Hawthorne Legacy was a finalist for a Goodreads Choice Award for Young Adult Fiction.

The Final Gambit won the 2022 Goodreads Choice Awards for Best Young Adult Fiction.

=== The Inheritance Games Spin-offs ===
The Brothers Hawthorne, a spin-off book portrayed after the events of The Inheritance Games released on August 29, 2023. The Brothers Hawthorne was a nominee for the Goodreads Choice Awards for Best Young Adult Fiction in 2023.

The Grandest Game is the first book in a new spin-off series from The Inheritance Games, released on July 30, 2024.

Glorious Rivals is the second book in the spin-off series from The Inheritance Games, which was released on July 29, 2025.

=== Debutantes (2018–2019) ===
Debutantes is a young adult mystery novel series published by Freeform. The series consists of two books: Little White Lies (2018) and Deadly Little Scandals (2019).

=== The Fixer (2015–2016) ===
The Fixer is a young adult mystery novel series published by Bloomsbury Children's Books. The series consists of two books: The Fixer (2015) and The Long Game (2016).

The first book in the series, The Fixer, was nominated for the South Carolina Book Award for Young Adult (2018) and the Missouri Truman Readers Award (2018).

=== The Naturals (2013–2026) ===
The Naturals is a young adult novel series published by Disney-Hyperion. The series consists of six books: The Naturals (2013), Killer Instinct (2014), All In (2015), Bad Blood (2016), Twelve the novella (2017), Dangerous Impulses (2026).

The first book in the series, The Naturals, was nominated for the Lincoln Award and the Missouri Gateway Readers Award in 2018 and was a YALSA Best Fiction for Young Adults selection in 2014.

== Publications ==
- The Inheritance Games
  - The Inheritance Games (2020)
  - The Hawthorne Legacy (2021)
  - The Final Gambit (2022)
  - The Brothers Hawthorne (2023)
  - Games Untold (2024)
- The Grandest Game (2024)
  - Glorious Rivals (2025)
  - The Gilded Blade(2026)
- The Same Backward as Forward (2026)
- Debutantes
  - Little White Lies (2018)
  - Deadly Little Scandals (2019)
- The Naturals
  - The Naturals (2013)
  - Killer Instinct (2014)
  - All In (2015)
  - Bad Blood (2016)
  - Twelve (2017)

Dangerous Impulses(2026)

- The Fixer
  - The Fixer (The Ruling Class) (2015)
  - The Long Game (Lessons in Power) (2016)
- Raised by Wolves
  - Raised by Wolves (2010)
  - Sweet Sixteen (2015)
  - Trial by Fire (2011)
  - Taken by Storm (2012)
- The Squad
  - Perfect Cover (2008)
  - Killer Spirit (2008)
- Tattoo
  - Tattoo (2007)
  - Fate (2009)
- Golden
  - Golden (2006)
  - Platinum (2007)
- Standalone novels
  - The Lovely and the Lost (2019)
  - Nobody / At First Sight (2013)
  - Every Other Day (2011)
