= Nova Ren Suma =

American novelist

- Nova Ren Suma
- Born: Queens, New York, US
- Education: Antioch College (BA); Columbia University (MFA)
- Occupation: Novelist
- Writing career
- Period: 2009 - present
- Genre: Young adult fiction
- Notable work: The Walls Around Us
- Website: novaren.com

Nova Ren Suma is an American #1 New York Times best selling author of young adult novels. Her best-known work is The Walls Around Us. Her novels have twice been finalists for the Edgar Award for Best Young Adult from Mystery Writers of America.

== Personal life ==
Suma was born in Queens, New York, and grew up in the Hudson Valley. She lived in Saugerties, New York, until she was five and moved to Pennington, New Jersey, after her parents' divorce. She spent her teen years living in Woodstock, New York, where she frequented the Ashokan Reservoir, which became the setting for her novel Imaginary Girls. Suma studied ballet from six to sixteen, which served as inspiration for her novel The Walls Around Us.

== Career ==
She cites discovering the works of Margaret Atwood when she was twelve years old as her reason for wanting to become a writer. The first fiction she ever wrote were poems and short stories, which piqued her interest to study writing. After Suma received her self-designed BA in journalism, creative writing and photography from Antioch College, she moved to New York City for graduate school at age 22, inspired by her mother's stories of her own experience in the city. She stayed in New York City and obtained an MFA in fiction from Columbia University.

She wrote two adult novels before discovering the possibility of writing young adult novels, through her day job out at HarperCollins Children's Books. She cites Laura Kasischke, Laura Ruby, Rita Williams-Garcia, Bennett Madison, and Francesca Lia Block as authors whose works deeply inspired her to write young adult novels herself. Other of her past jobs include being an assistant editor at Marvel Comics and an editorial & production associate at Raw Books.

She has been awarded residencies at the MacDowell Colony, Yaddo, and the Millay Colony for the Arts. She was awarded an NEA fellowship for a residency at the Hambidge Center for Arts & Sciences.

Her novel The Walls Around Us was a finalist for an Edgar Award for Best Young Adult in 2016. Her novel A Room Away from the Wolves was a finalist for the same award in 2019.

She teaches at Vermont College of Fine Arts, in the Writing for Children & Young Adults low-residency MFA program, and at the University of Pennsylvania.

In November 2017, she and fellow author Emily X.R. Pan founded Foreshadow: A Serial Anthology via the crowdfunding platform Indiegogo, as an online venue for established authors to publish short stories alongside new voices.

== Bibliography ==
=== Books ===
- Wake the Wild Creatures, Little, Brown Books for Young Readers (2025)
- A Room Away From the Wolves, Algonquin Young Readers (2018)
- The Walls Around Us, Algonquin Young Readers (2015)
- 17 & Gone, Dutton Books (2013)
- Fade Out, Simon Pulse (2012)
- Imaginary Girls, Dutton Books (2011)
- Dani Noir, Simon & Schuster/Aladdin (2009)

=== Short stories ===
- "Mars, New York", Gulf Coast (2001)
- "Hanami", Orchid (2002)
- "Ghost Story", New York Stories (2003)
- "Last Resort", Small Spiral Notebook (volume 3, issue 2 2006)
- "No Vacancy", LIT Magazine (issue 11 2006)
- "Some Kind of Happy Life", The Portland Review (spring 2007)
- "The Birds of Azalea Street", Slasher Girls & Monster Boys, Penguin (2015)
- "The One Who Stayed" in Toil & Trouble: 15 Tales of Women & Witchcraft, edited by Jessica Spotswood and Tess Sharpe (Harlequin Teen) (2018)
- "Twelve Frames", It's a Whole Spiel: Love, Latkes, & Other Jewish Stories, Knopf (2019)

=== Essays ===
- "Reading Worthy Women", Here We Are: Feminism for the Real World, Algonquin Young Readers (2017)
- "Reimagining Disappeared Worlds: Nova Ren Suma on the Allure of Writing Lost Places", Literary Hub (2025)
- "Outlaw Women in Fiction", CrimeReads (2025)

== Awards and nominations ==
Year	Award	Work	Category	Result	Ref
2015	Cybils Award	The Walls Around Us	Young Adult Fiction	Won	
2016	Edgar Award	The Walls Around Us	Best Young Adult Novel	Nominated (Finalist)	
2019	Edgar Award	A Room Away from the Wolves	Best Young Adult Novel	Nominated (Finalist)	
