= Arthur Alphin =

American historian

- Born: Arthur Brent Alphin; September 5, 1948
- Died: January 8, 2026 (aged 77)
- Resting place: Sunset Hills Cemetery, Bozeman, MT
- Education: United States Military Academy (BS) Rice University (MA)
- Occupation: former United States Army officer
- Known for: Founder and owner of A-Square
- Spouse: Elaine Marie Alphin
- Website: https://arthuralphin.com/

Lieutenant Colonel Arthur Brent Alphin (September 5, 1948 – January 8, 2026) was a United States Army officer and military historian.

He was the founder and owner of A-Square, manufacturer of American hunting rifles. He taught military history at West Point. After his retirement, he co-authored several books with his wife and children's author Elaine Marie Alphin.

He also assisted ghostwriter Lisa Harkrader in writing Animorphs #51: The Absolute, by providing her with information about tanks and reading over the book to check for errors.

== Works ==
- The warrior heritage: a study of Rhodesia. Rice University. 1980.
- Elaine Marie Alphin; Arthur B. Alphin (2004). I have not yet begun to fight: a story about John Paul Jones. Illustrated Paul Casale. Millbrook Press. ISBN 978-1-57505-601-2.
- Elaine Marie Alphin; Arthur B. Alphin (2004). Dwight D. Eisenhower. Lerner Publications. ISBN 978-0-8225-1544-9. "Arthur Alphin."
