= Courtney Summers =

Canadian young adult fiction author

- Born: 1986 (age 39–40); Belleville, Ontario
- Citizenship: Canada
- Occupation: Novelist
- Writing career
- Period: 2009 – present
- Genres: Young adult, Fiction
- Notable works: Cracked Up to Be (2008); This is Not a Test]] (2012); All the Rage (2015); Sadie (2018)
- Website: courtneysummers.ca

Courtney Summers (born 1986 in Belleville, Ontario, Canada) is a Canadian writer of young adult fiction. Her most famous known works are Cracked Up to Be (2008), This Is Not a Test (2012) and All the Rage (2015).

== Career ==
Her first novel, Cracked Up to Be, was published in December 2008 and was the 2009 Cybils Award winner for YA Fiction. Her sophomore novel, Some Girls Are, was published in January 2010. It received reviews from Kirkus Reviews, Publishers Weekly, and School Library Journal, and was a 2010 Goodreads Choice Awards nominee in the YA Fiction category.

Her third novel, Fall for Anything, was published in December 2010 and received starred reviews from Kirkus Reviews and Booklist.

This Is Not a Test was published June 2012 and is set during a zombie apocalypse. Prior to its release, all of Summers' novels were contemporary and realistic. This Is Not a Test received a starred review from Publishers Weekly.

Summers' fifth novel, All the Rage, was her hardcover debut and published in April 2015. It received reviews from Kirkus Reviews, Publishers Weekly and School Library Journal. It was also named a Spring 2015 Junior Library Guild Selection. Her novel Sadie tells the story of a teenager named Sadie Hunter whose little sister Mattie was murdered. Sadie seeks revenge against the man she believes killed Mattie. The book was released on September 4, 2018, and is told from two perspectives: some chapters offering Sadie's point of view and some chapters being styled as transcripts from a podcast called "The Girls" hosted by a man named West McCray. The release of the book was accompanied by the release of a mock true-crime podcast titled The Girls: Find Sadie which is available on Apple Podcasts and Stitcher. Sadie became a New York Times bestseller on September 29, 2018, and has been awarded the 2019 Edgar Award for Best Young Adult literature from the Mystery Writers of America. Sadie also won the 2019 Odyssey Award from the American Library Association and was a Bank Street Children's Book Committee's Best Book of the Year in 2019.

Summers has also contributed short stories to the anthologies Defy the Dark and Violent Ends.

== Works ==
=== Books ===
- —— (2008). Cracked Up to Be. St. Martin's Press. ISBN 9780312383695.
- —— (2010). Some Girls Are. St. Martin's Press. ISBN 9780312573805.
- —— (2011). Fall for Anything. St. Martin's Press. ISBN 9780312656737.
- —— (2012). This Is Not a Test. St. Martin's Press. ISBN 9780312656744.
- —— (2013). What Goes Around. St. Martin's Press. ISBN 9781250038449.
- —— (2015). Please Remain Calm. St. Martin's Press. ISBN 9781466875906.
- All the Rage, St. Martin's Press (2015) (ISBN 9781250021915)
- Sadie, St. Martin's Press (2018) (ISBN 9781250105714)
- The Project, St. Martin's Press (2021) (ISBN 9781250105738)
- I'm the Girl, Wednesday Books (2022) (ISBN 9781250808363)

=== Short stories ===
- "Sleepstalk", Defy the Dark edited by Saundra Mitchell
- "The Likability Rule", Violent Ends edited by Shaun Hutchinson (2015)

=== Essays ===
- "Here We Are: Feminism for the Real World", Here We Are: Feminism for the Real World from Algonquin BFYR, January 2017

== Awards and nominations ==
Year	Work	Award	Category	Result	Ref
2009	Cracked Up to Be	Cybils Award	Young Adult Fiction	Won	
2009	Cracked Up to Be	OLA Forest of Reading Awards	White Pine Award (YA Fiction)	Nominated	
2010	Some Girls Are	OLA Forest of Reading Awards	White Pine Award (YA Fiction)	Nominated (Honor)	
2010	Some Girls Are	Goodreads Choice Award	Young Adult Fiction	Nominated	
2014	This Is Not a Test	OLA Forest of Reading Awards	White Pine Award (Fiction)	Nominated (Honor)	
2019	Sadie	Audie Award	Audio Book (Young Adult)	Won	
2019	Sadie	Cybils Award	Young Adult Fiction	Won	
2019	Sadie	Odyssey Award	Audio Book (Children or Young Adult)	Won	
2019	Sadie	Edgar Award	Young Adult Novel	Won	
2020	Sadie	White Pine Award	Fiction	Won	
