= Edgar Allan Poe Award for Best Paperback Original =

Annual literary award

The Edgar Allan Poe Award for Best Paperback or eBook Original was a category of the Edgar Awards established in 1970.

The award honors the best mystery book that is initially printed as a paperback or eBook without a hardcover edition. EBooks must be published by a reputable publisher, as determined by the Mystery Writers of America. American authors' debut novels are not eligible for the award, though they are eligible for the Edgar Allan Poe Award for Best First Novel.

The Edgar Allan Poe Award for Best Paperback Original winners are listed below.

== Winners ==
=== 1970s ===
1970s Best Paperback Original winners
Year	Author	Title	Result	Ref.
1970	Scott C. S. Stone	The Dragon's Eye	Winner	
1970	Alan Caillou	Assault on Ming	Shortlist	
1970	Elsie Cromwell	The Governess	Shortlist	
1970	Michael Kurland	A Plague of Spies	Shortlist	
1970	Richard Stark	The Sour Lemon Score	Shortlist	
1971	Dan J. Marlowe	Flashpoint	Winner	
1971	Jack Ehrlich	The Drowning	Shortlist	
1971	Matt Gattzden	O.D. at Sweet Claude’s	Shortlist	
1971	Ron Goulart	After Things Fell Apart	Shortlist	
1971	John Lange	Grave Descend	Shortlist	
1971	Peter McCurtin	Mafioso	Shortlist	
1972	Frank McAuliffe	For Murder I Charge More	Winner	
1972	Philip Atlee	The White Wolverine Contract	Shortlist	
1972	William F. Nolan	Space for Hire	Shortlist	
1972	Alicen White	Nor Spell, Nor Charm	Shortlist	
1972	Charles Williams	And the Deep Blue Sea	Shortlist	
1973	Richard Wormser	The Invader	Winner	
1973	Daniel Banko	Not Dead Yet	Shortlist	
1973	Richard Neely	The Smith Conspiracy	Shortlist	
1973	Charles Runyon	Power Kill	Shortlist	
1974	Will Perry	Death of an Informer	Winner	
1974	Clive Cussler	The Mediterranean Caper	Shortlist	
1974	Leo P. Kelley	Deadlocked!	Shortlist	
1974	Dinah Palmtag	Starling Street	Shortlist	
1974	Roger L. Simon	The Big Fix	Shortlist	
1975	Roy Winsor	The Corpse That Walked	Winner	
1975	Richard Forrest	Who Killed Mr. Garland’s Mistress?	Shortlist	
1975	R. R. Irvine	Jump Cut	Shortlist	
1975	Curtis Stevens	The Gravy Train Hit	Shortlist	
1975	Don Tracy	Flats Fixed-Among Other Things	Shortlist	
1976	John R. Feegel	Autopsy	Winner	
1976	Milt Machlin and Robin Moore	The Set-Up	Shortlist	
1976	Jacqueline Park	Charlie’s Back in Town	Shortlist	
1976	Simon Quinn	The Midas Coffin	Shortlist	
1976	David Vowell	The Assassinator	Shortlist	
1977	Gregory Mcdonald	Confess, Fletch	Winner	
1977	Daniel da Cruz	The Captive City	Shortlist	
1977	Kenn Davis and John Stanley	The Dark Side	Shortlist	
1977	Donald Hamilton	The Retaliators	Shortlist	
1977	R. R. Irvine	Freeze Frame	Shortlist	
1978	Mike Jahn	The Quark Maneuver	Winner	
1978	Lawrence Block	Time to Murder and Create	Shortlist	
1978	Donald Hamilton	The Terrorizers	Shortlist	
1978	Marc Olden	They’ve Killed Anna	Shortlist	
1979	Frank Bandy	Deceit and Deadly Lies	Winner	
1979	David Anthony	Stud Game	Shortlist	
1979	Elmore Leonard	The Switch	Shortlist	
1979	Phillip Margolin	Heartstone	Shortlist	
1979	Graham Masterton	Charnel House	Shortlist	

=== 1980s ===
1980s Best Paperback Original winners
Year	Author	Title	Result	Ref.
1980	William L. DeAndrea	The Hog Murders	Winner	
1980	Sean Flannery	The Kremlin Conspiracy	Shortlist	
1980	David Heller	Vortex	Shortlist	
1980	Glenn Kezer	The Queen Is Dead	Shortlist	
1980	Michael Kurland	The Infernal Device	Shortlist	
1981	Bill Granger	Public Murders	Winner	
1981	Thomas H. Cook	Blood Innocents	Shortlist	
1981	John Dunning	Looking for Ginger North	Shortlist	
1981	Murray Sinclair	Tough Luck, L.A.	Shortlist	
1982	L. A. Morse	The Old Dick	Winner	
1982	John Dunning	Deadline	Shortlist	
1982	Patricia MacDonald	The Unforgiven	Shortlist	
1982	Andrew Neiderman	Pin	Shortlist	
1982	Ray Obstfeld	Dead Heat	Shortlist	
1983	Teri White	Triangle	Winner	
1983	Ralph Burrows	Vital Signs	Shortlist	
1983	James Ellroy	Clandestine	Shortlist	
1983	Jack Lynch	The Missing and the Dead	Shortlist	
1984	Margaret Tracy	Mrs. White	Winner	
1984	Sean Flannery	False Prophets	Shortlist	
1984	Richard Harper	The Kill Factor	Shortlist	
1984	Warren Murphy	Trace	Shortlist	
1984	Eric Sauter	Hunter	Shortlist	
1985	Molly Cochran and Warren Murphy	Grandmaster	Winner	
1985	Eric Blau	The Keys to Billy Tillio	Shortlist	
1985	Roland Cutler	The Seventh Sacrament	Shortlist	
1985	Kenn Davis	Words Can Kill	Shortlist	
1985	Stuart M. Kaminsky	Black Knight in Red Square	Shortlist	
1986	Warren Murphy	Pigs Get Fat	Winner	
1986	Earl Emerson	Poverty Bay	Shortlist	
1986	Sean Flannery	Broken Idols	Shortlist	
1986	Philip Ross	Blue Heron	Shortlist	
1986	Conall Ryan	Black Gravity	Shortlist	
1987	Robert Wright Campbell	The Junkyard Dog	Winner	
1987	Lilian Jackson Braun	The Cat Who Saw Red	Shortlist	
1987	R. D. Brown	Hazzard	Shortlist	
1987	Nick Christian	Ronin	Shortlist	
1987	Kate Green	Shattered Moon	Shortlist	
1988	Sharyn McCrumb	Bimbos of the Death Sun	Winner	
1988	Robert Crais	The Monkey's Raincoat	Shortlist	
1988	Walter Dillon	Deadly Intrusion	Shortlist	
1988	James N. Frey	The Long Way to Die	Shortlist	
1988	Gabrielle Kraft	Bullshot	Shortlist	
1989	Timothy Findley	The Telling of Lies	Winner	
1989	Fredrick D. Huebner	Judgment by Fire	Shortlist	
1989	Lia Matera	A Radical Departure	Shortlist	
1989	Keith Peterson	The Trapdoor	Shortlist	
1989	Ted Thackrey, Jr.	Preacher	Shortlist	

=== 1990s ===
1990s Best Paperback Original winners
Year	Author	Title	Result	Ref.
1990	Keith Peterson	The Rain	Winner	
1990	Jeffery Deaver	Manhattan Is My Beat	Shortlist	
1990	Eugene Izzi	King of the Hustlers	Shortlist	
1990	Randy Russell	Hot Wire	Shortlist	
1990	Deborah Valentine	A Collector of Photographs	Shortlist	
1991	David Handler	The Man Who Would Be F. Scott Fitzgerald	Winner	
1991	L. L Enger	Comeback	Shortlist	
1991	Jane Haddam	Not a Creature Was Stirring	Shortlist	
1991	B. J. Oliphant	Dead in the Scrub	Shortlist	
1991	John Maddox Roberts	SPQR I: The King’s Gambit	Shortlist	
1992	Thomas Adcock	Dark Maze	Winner	
1992	P. M. Carlson	Murder in the Dog Days	Shortlist	
1992	Ed Naha	Cracking Up	Shortlist	
1992	Christopher Newman	Midtown North	Shortlist	
1992	Deborah Valentine	Fine Distinctions	Shortlist	
1993	Dana Stabenow	A Cold Day for Murder	Winner	
1993	Lee Harris	The Good Friday Murder	Shortlist	
1993	Gini Hartzmark	Principal Defense	Shortlist	
1993	William Jefferies	Shallow Graves	Shortlist	
1993	Billie Sue Mosiman	Night Cruise	Shortlist	
1994	Steven Womack	Dead Folk's Blues	Winner	
1994	Margaret Frazer	The Servant’s Tale	Shortlist	
1994	Eugene Izzi	Tony’s Justice	Shortlist	
1994	Thomas A. Roberts	Beyond Saru	Shortlist	
1994	Lisa Scottoline	Everywhere That Mary Went	Shortlist	
1995	Lisa Scottoline	Final Appeal	Winner	
1995	Milton Bass	The Broken-Hearted Detective	Shortlist	
1995	Dean Feldmeyer	Viper Quarry	Shortlist	
1995	Walter Sorrells	Power of Attorney	Shortlist	
1995	Chassie West	Sunrise	Shortlist	
1996	William Heffernan	Tarnished Blue	Winner	
1996	Harlan Coben	Deal Breaker	Shortlist	
1996	Kirk Mitchell	High Desert Malice	Shortlist	
1996	Gloria White	Charged With Guilt	Shortlist	
1996	R. D. Wingfield	Hard Frost	Shortlist	
1997	Harlan Coben	Fade Away	Winner	
1997	Joan M. Drury	Silent Words	Shortlist	
1997	Teri Holbrook	The Grass Widow	Shortlist	
1997	Susan Wade	Walking Rain	Shortlist	
1997	R. D. Zimmerman	Tribe	Shortlist	
1998	Laura Lippman	Charm City	Winner	
1998	Susan Rogers Cooper	Home Again, Home Again	Shortlist	
1998	Margaret Frazer	The Prioress’ Tale	Shortlist	
1998	Stuart M. Kaminsky	Tarnished Icons	Shortlist	
1998	Gloria White	Sunset and Santiago	Shortlist	
1999	Rick Riordan	The Widower's Two-Step	Winner	
1999	Ruth Birmingham	Atlanta Graves	Shortlist	
1999	Laura Lippman	Butchers Hill	Shortlist	
1999	Sujata Massey	Zen Attitude	Shortlist	
1999	Steven Womack	Murder Manual	Shortlist	

=== 2000s ===
2000s Best Paperback Original winners
Year	Author	Title	Result	Ref.
2000	Ruth Birmingham	Fulton County Blues	Winner	
2000	Tony Dunbar	Lucky Man	Shortlist	
2000	Mark Graham	The Resurrectionist	Shortlist	
2000	José Latour	Outcast	Shortlist	
2000	Laura Lippman	In Big Trouble	Shortlist	
2001	Mark Graham	The Black Maria	Winner	
2001	Victoria Thompson	Murder on St. Mark’s Place	Shortlist	
2001	Chassie West	Killing Kin	Shortlist	
2001	Eric Wright	The Kidnapping of Rosie Dawn	Shortlist	
2001	Sally Wright	Pursuit and Persuasion	Shortlist	
2002	Daniel Chavarria	Adios Muchachos	Winner	
2002	Jeffery Deaver	Hell’s Kitchen	Shortlist	
2002	Teri Holbrook	The Mother Tongue	Shortlist	
2002	P. J. Parrish	Dead of Winter	Shortlist	
2002	Martin J. Smith	Straw Men	Shortlist	
2003	T. J. MacGregor	Out of Sight	Winner	
2003	Jeff Abbott	Black Jack Point	Shortlist	
2003	John Lutz	The Night Watcher	Shortlist	
2003	Graham Masterton	Trauma	Shortlist	
2003	Anna Salter	Prison Blues	Shortlist	
2004	Sylvia Maultash Warsh	Find Me Again	Winner	
2004	Jeff Abbott	Cut and Run	Shortlist	
2004	Joel Goldman	The Last Witness	Shortlist	
2004	Christopher Hyde	Wisdom of the Bones	Shortlist	
2004	Nina Revoyr	Southland	Shortlist	
2005	Domenic Stansberry	The Confession	Winner	
2005	Larry Beinhart	The Librarian	Shortlist	
2005	Thomas H. Cook	Into the Web	Shortlist	
2005	Ron Faust	Dead Men Rise Up Never	Shortlist	
2005	Chris Haslam	Twelve-Step Fandango	Shortlist	
2006	Jeffrey Ford	Girl in the Glass	Winner	
2006	Anne Argula	Homicide My Own	Shortlist	
2006	Reed Farrel Coleman	The James Deans	Shortlist	
2006	Allan Guthrie	Kiss Her Goodbye	Shortlist	
2006	Charlie Huston	Six Bad Things	Shortlist	
2007	Naomi Hirahara	Snakeskin Shamisen	Winner	
2007	Massimo Carlotto	The Goodbye Kiss	Shortlist	
2007	Brian Evenson	The Open Curtain	Shortlist	
2007	Paul Levine	The Deep Blue Alibi	Shortlist	
2007	Patrick Neate	City of Tiny Lights	Shortlist	
2008	Megan Abbott	Queenpin	Winner	
2008	David Corbett	Blood of Paradise	Shortlist	
2008	Vicki Hendricks	Cruel Poetry	Shortlist	
2008	Russell Hill	Robbie’s Wife	Shortlist	
2008	Kevin Wignall	Who Is Conrad Hirst?	Shortlist	
2009	Meg Gardiner	China Lake	Winner	
2009	Alex Carr	The Prince of Bagram Prison	Shortlist	
2009	Christa Faust	Money Shot	Shortlist	
2009	Ed Gaffney	Enemy Combatant	Shortlist	
2009	Tom Piccirilli	The Cold Spot	Shortlist	

=== 2010s ===
2010s Best Paperback Original winners
Year	Author	Title	Result	Ref.
2010	Marc Strange	Body Blows	Winner	
2010	Megan Abbott	Bury Me Deep	Shortlist	
2010	Robert Arellano	Havana Lunar	Shortlist	
2010	Russell Hill	The Lord God Bird	Shortlist	
2010	L. C. Tyler	The Herring Seller’s Apprentice	Shortlist	
2011	Robert Goddard	Long Time Coming	Winner	
2011	Catherine O'Flynn	The News Where You Are	Shortlist	
2011	Duane Swierczynski	Expiration Date	Shortlist	
2011	Frank Tallis	Vienna Secrets	Shortlist	
2011	L. C. Tyler	Ten Little Herrings	Shortlist	
2012	Robert Jackson Bennett	The Company Man	Winner	
2012	Lucretia Grindle	The Faces of Angels	Shortlist	
2012	Russell Hill	The Dog Sox	Shortlist	
2012	Michael Stanley	Death of the Mantis	Shortlist	
2012	Frank Tallis	Vienna Twilight	Shortlist	
2013	Ben H. Winters	The Last Policeman	Winner	
2013	Isaac Adamson	Complication	Shortlist	
2013	Lou Berney	Whiplash River	Shortlist	
2013	Alan Glynn	Bloodland	Shortlist	
2013	Malla Nunn	Blessed Are the Dead	Shortlist	
2014	Alex Marwood	The Wicked Girls	Winner	
2014	Lisa Ballantyne	The Guilty One	Shortlist	
2014	E. R. Brown	Almost Criminal	Shortlist	
2014	Paul Cleave	Joe Victim	Shortlist	
2014	Stephen King	Joyland	Shortlist	
2014	Marcus Sakey	Brilliance	Shortlist	
2015	Chris Abani	The Secret History of Las Vegas	Winner	
2015	Alison Gaylin	Stay With Me	Shortlist	
2015	William Lashner	The Barkeep	Shortlist	
2015	Catriona McPherson	The Day She Died	Shortlist	
2015	Lisa Turner	The Gone Dead Train	Shortlist	
2015	Ben H. Winters	World of Trouble	Shortlist	
2016	Lou Berney	The Long and Faraway Gone	Winner	
2016	Malcolm MacKay	The Necessary Death of Lewis Winter	Shortlist	
2016	Gilly Macmillan	What She Knew	Shortlist	
2016	Gordon McAlpine	Woman with a Blue Pencil	Shortlist	
2016	Adrian McKinty	Gun Street Girl	Shortlist	
2016	Jane Shemilt	The Daughter	Shortlist	
2017	Adrian McKinty	Rain Dogs	Winner	
2017	Patricia Abbott	Shot in Detroit	Shortlist	
2017	Tyler Dilts	Come Twilight	Shortlist	
2017	Robert Dugoni	The 7th Canon	Shortlist	
2017	Robin Yocum	A Brilliant Death	Shortlist	
2017	James W. Ziskin	Heart of Stone	Shortlist	
2018	Anna Mazzola	The Unseeing	Winner	
2018	Rhys Bowen	In Farleigh Field	Shortlist	
2018	Ron Corbett	Ragged Lake	Shortlist	
2018	Andrew Mayne	Black Fall	Shortlist	
2018	Kanae Minato	Penance	Shortlist	
2018	Jock Serong	The Rules of Backyard Cricket	Shortlist	
2019	Alison Gaylin	If I Die Tonight	Winner	
2019	Naomi Hirahara	Hiroshima Boy	Shortlist	
2019	Lori Rader-Day	Under a Dark Sky	Shortlist	
2019	Leila Slimani	The Perfect Nanny	Shortlist	
2019	Lisa Unger	Under My Skin	Shortlist	

=== 2020s ===
2020s Best Paperback Original winners
Year	Author	Title	Result	Ref.
2020	Adam O'Fallon Price	The Hotel Neversink	Winner	
2020	Susan Alice Bickford	Dread of Winter	Shortlist	
2020	William Lashner	Freedom Road	Shortlist	
2020	Jonathan Moore	Blood Relations	Shortlist	
2020	Alan Parks	February’s Son	Shortlist	
2020	Lisa Sandlin	The Bird Boys	Shortlist	
2021	Alyssa Cole	When No One Is Watching	Winner	
2021	Brian Freeman	The Deep, Deep Snow	Shortlist	
2021	Jess Lourey	Unspeakable Things	Shortlist	
2021	Jessica Moor	The Keeper	Shortlist	
2021	Khurrum Rahman	East of Hounslow	Shortlist	
2022	Alan Parks	Bobby March Will Live Forever	Winner	
2022	David Bell	Kill all Your Darlings	Shortlist	
2022	C.J. Cooke	The Lighthouse Witches	Shortlist	
2022	Daryl Gregory	The Album of Dr. Moreau	Shortlist	
2022	C.S. O'Cinneide	Starr Sign	Shortlist	
2022	Laura Purcell	The Shape of Darkness	Shortlist	
2023	Joe Hart	Or Else	Winner	
2023	Max Allan Collins	Quarry’s Blood	Shortlist	
2023	Seraphina Nova Glass	On a Quiet Street	Shortlist	
2023	Carol Lawrence	Cleopatra’s Dagger	Shortlist	
2023	A.R. Torre	A Familiar Stranger	Shortlist	
2024	Jesse Q. Sutanto	Vera Wong’s Unsolicited Advice for Murderers	Winner	
2024	A.F. Carter	Boomtown	Shortlist	
2024	Tracy Clark	Hide	Shortlist	
2024	Jess Lourey	The Taken Ones	Shortlist	
2024	Scott Von Doviak	Lowdown Road	Shortlist	
2025	Kimberly Belle	The Paris Widow	Winner	
2025	Seraphina Nova Glass	The Vacancy in Room 10	Shortlist	
2025	Bonnie Kistler	Shell Games	Shortlist	
2025	Isabella Maldonado	A Forgotten Kill	Shortlist	
2025	Alexis Stefanovich-Thomson	The Road to Heaven	Shortlist	
2026	Vikki Wakefield	The Backwater	Winner	
2026	Sacha Bronwasser	Listen	Shortlist	
2026	Holly Kennedy	The Sideways Life of Denny Voss	Shortlist	
2026	Matthew Spencer	Broke Road	Shortlist	
2026	Abbi Waxman	One Death at a Time	Shortlist	
