= Chris Abani bibliography =

The bibliography of Chris Abani lists works by Nigerian author Chris Abani.

== Novellas ==
- Masters of the Board (1984). Enugu: Delta publishers
- Sirocco (1987). Nigeria: Swan publishers
- GraceLand (February 15, 2004). New York: Farrar, Straus & Giroux ISBN 9780374165895
- Becoming Abigail (2006). New York: Akashic Books ISBN 9781888451948
- Song for Night (2007). New York: Akashic Books ISBN 9781933354316
- The Virgin of Flames (2007). New York: Penguin ISBN 9780143038771
- The Secret History of Las Vegas (2014). New York: Penguin ISBN 9780143124955

== Memoir ==
- The Face: Cartography of the Void (2013). New York: Restless Books ISBN 9781632060143

== Short story collection ==
- Lagos Noir (June 5, 2018). Brooklyn, US: Akashic Books ISBN 9781617755231

== Poetry collections ==
- Kalakuta Republic (2000). London: Saqi Books
- Daphne's Lot (2003). Los Angeles: Red Hen Press
- Dog Woman (2004). Los Angeles: Red Hen Press
- Hands Washing Water (2006). Port Townsend: Copper Canyon Press
- Sanctificum (2010). Port Townsend: Copper Canyon Press
- There Are No Names for Red (2010). Los Angeles: Red Hen Press
- Feed Me the Sun: Collected Long Poems (2010). Leeds: Peepal Tree Press
- Smoking the Bible (May 17, 2022). Port Townsend: Copper Canyon Press ISBN 9781619322547

== Plays ==
- Room at the Top (1985 TV play). Nigeria: Imo State Broadcasting Station
- Song of a Broken Flute (1990 performance play). Nigeria: Imo State University (directed by Abani)
- The Poet, The Soldier, The Lover and The Paper-Kite Maker (2003 performance play). Los Angeles, USA: The Actors' Gang (directed by Abani and Antonia Carneval).

== Screenplays ==
- Fela! (2010). Nigeria: Focus Features and Film 4
- The Last King of the Jews (2014)
- Death and the King's Horseman (2016)

== Articles and essays ==
- "The Lion" (1978). Owerri, Nigeria: Statesman Newspaper
- "Jazz Petals" in Burning Words, Flaming Images: Poems and Short Stories by Writers of African Descent (1996) by Kadija Sesay. London: SAKS Publications, pp. 22-27.
- "Becoming Abigail" in IC3: The Penguin Book of New Black Writing in Britain (2000) by Courttia Newland and Kadija Sesay. London: Hamish Hamilton, pp. 247-253.
- "Such Sweet Thunder" (2002). StoryQuarterly
- "Weeping Madonna" (2003). StoryQuarterly, pp. 56-62.
- "Blooding" (2003). StoryQuarterly, pp. 164-169.
- "It Wasn't Lemonade" (2005). Mosaic, pp. 70-72.
- "A Conversation over Tea" in Stumbling and Raging: More Politically Inspired Fiction (2005) by Stephen Elliott and Greg Larson. San Francisco, US: MacAdam/Cage, pp. 105-106.
- "Albino Crow" in Prose Fiction and Non-Fiction Prose (2007), pp. 721-729. Also published in Best African American Fiction 2009 (2009) by Gerald Early and E. Lynn Harris. New York: Bantam Books, pp. 8-20.
- "Three Letters, One Song & A Refrain" (2008). Daedalus, pp. 87-91.
- "From Four Movements" (2011). Callaloo, pp. 682-697.
- "Killer Ape" in Lagos Noir (2018) by Chris Abani. New York: Akashic Books, pp. 201-217.
- "All Shook Up" (2003). Savoy
- "Mapping Obscurity: Excavating Meaning Base Materials and the African Literary Tradition" (2003). International Journal of Ethiopian Studies, pp. 121-132.
- "Resisting the Anomie: Exile and the Romantic Self" in Creativity in Exile (2004) by Mike Hanne. Amsterdam and New York: Rodopi, pp. 21-30.
- "The Lottery" (1 February 2004). The New York Times, p. 74. Also published in Patterns for A Purpose: A Rhetorical Reader (2010) by Barbara Fine Clouse. New York: McGraw Hill Education
- "Language Portrait" in Now Write!: Fiction Writing Exercises from Today's Best Writers and Teachers (2006) by Sherry Ellis. New York: Penguin, pp. 105-106.
- "Abigail and My Becoming" (19 April 2006). Truthdig
- "Of Ancestors and Progeny: Moments in Nigerian Literature" (2006). Black Issues, pp. 24-25.
- "Lagos: A Pilgrimage in 13 Nations" (2007). Farafina
- "A Good African" (2008). PEN America
- "American Empire: A Libretto in Eight Movements" in How They See Us: Meditations on America (2008) by James Atlas. New York: Atlas and Co Publishers, pp. 175-185.
- "This Red String Is For You Mama" in I Live Here (2008) by Mia Kirshner, J.B. MacKinnon, Michael Simons and Paul Shoebridge. New York: Pantheon Books
- "Love Letter" (2008). PEN America, pp. 33-34.
- "What Men Aren't Telling Us" (2008). O: The Oprah Magazine
- "Coming to America: A Remix" (2008). Tarpaulin Sky. Also published in Experiences of Freedom in Postcolonial Literatures and Cultures (2011) by Annalisa Oboe and Shaul Bassi. Abingdon and New York: Routledge, pp. 117-121.
- "When we cannot look away" (18 October 2008). Age, p. 16.
- "Omar Sharif Comes to Nollywood: A Storyboard in 10 Frames" in Nollywood (2009) by Pieter Hugo, Zina Saro-Wiwa and Stacy Hardy. Munich, Germany: Prestel Verlag, pp. 7-16.
- "Lagos: A Pilgrimage in Notations" in African Cities Reader I: Pan-African Practices (2010) by Ntone Edjabe and Edgar Pietersepp. Cape Town, South Africa: African Centre for Cities & Chimurenga, pp. 1-8.
- "Another Country" in Bound to Last: 30 Writers on Their Most Cherished Book (2010) by Sean Manning. Cambridge, MA: Da Capo Press, pp. 192-199.
- "For Chris Akunda" (3 July 2010). Pilgrimages. Also published in Essay on oil in the Niger Delta (2011) by Marie Claire, p. 74.
- "Las Vegas: The Last African City" in African Cities Reader II: Mobilities & Fixtures (2011) by Ntone Edjabe and Edgar Pieterse. Cape Town, South Africa: African Centre for Cities & Chimurenga, pp. 89-91.
- "Humanity's willing curator" (7 October 2011). Mail & Guardian
- "Chinua Achebe: My Complicated Literary Father" (25 March 2013). Wall Street Journal
- "Our Living Ancestor: Chris Abani Remembers Chinua Achebe" (26 March 2013). Daily Beast
- "Painting a Body of Loss and Love in the Proximity of an Aesthetic" (25 November 2013). The Millions
- "A Young Seminarian Found Comfort In Giovanni's Melancholy" (28 December 2013). NPR Books
- "Sin City On-Screen: Sexy and Shocking Scenes Set in Las Vegas" (31 January 2014). Bookish. Also published in Text in Africa Junctions: Capturing The City (2015) by Lard Buurman. Berlin: Hatje Cantz.
- "Ghosting, Invisibility and the Erasure of Particular Bodies: A Spell" (29 June 2015). Four Way Review
- "The Graceful Walk" in The Routledge Companion to Literature and Human Rights (2016) by Sophia A. McClennen and Alexandra Schultheis Moore. Abingdon: Routledge, pp. 499-506.
