= List of Hindu temples in Guwahati =

There are many Hindu temples in Guwahati, which is why it is also known as the "city of temples". Notable temples include:-

Name	Locality	Presiding deity	Image
Basistha Temple	Basistha	Shiva	
Dirgheshwari Temple	Amingaon	Durga	
Doul Govinda Temple	Rajaduar	Krishna	
Kamakhya Temple	Kamakhya	Goddess Kamakhya	
Lankeshwar Temple	Lankeshwar	Shiva	
Rudreswar Temple	Mani Karneswar	Shiva	
Sukreswar Temple	Pan Bazaar	Shiva	
Ugro Tara Temple	Latasil	Goddess Tara	
Umananda Temple	Peacock island	Shiva	
Shree Shyam Mandir, Guwahati	A.T. Road, Chatribari	Khatushyam	
Navagraha Temple	Chitrasal Hill, Silpukhuri	Nine planet	

== See also ==
- List of temples in Bhubaneswar
