= Alan Parkes =

Alan Parkes may refer to:

- Alan Parkes (footballer) (1929–2013), English footballer
- Sir Alan Sterling Parkes (1900–1990), English reproductive biologist

== See also ==
- Sir Alan Parks (1920–1982), British colorectal surgeon
- Alan Parks (writer) (born 1963), Scottish crime writer
