= Alison Drake =

Alison Drake may refer to:

- Alison Drake, pseudonym used by writer T. J. MacGregor
- Alison Drake (diver), English diver
