= Maha Mrityunjay Temple =

Hindu temple in Nagaon, Assam, India

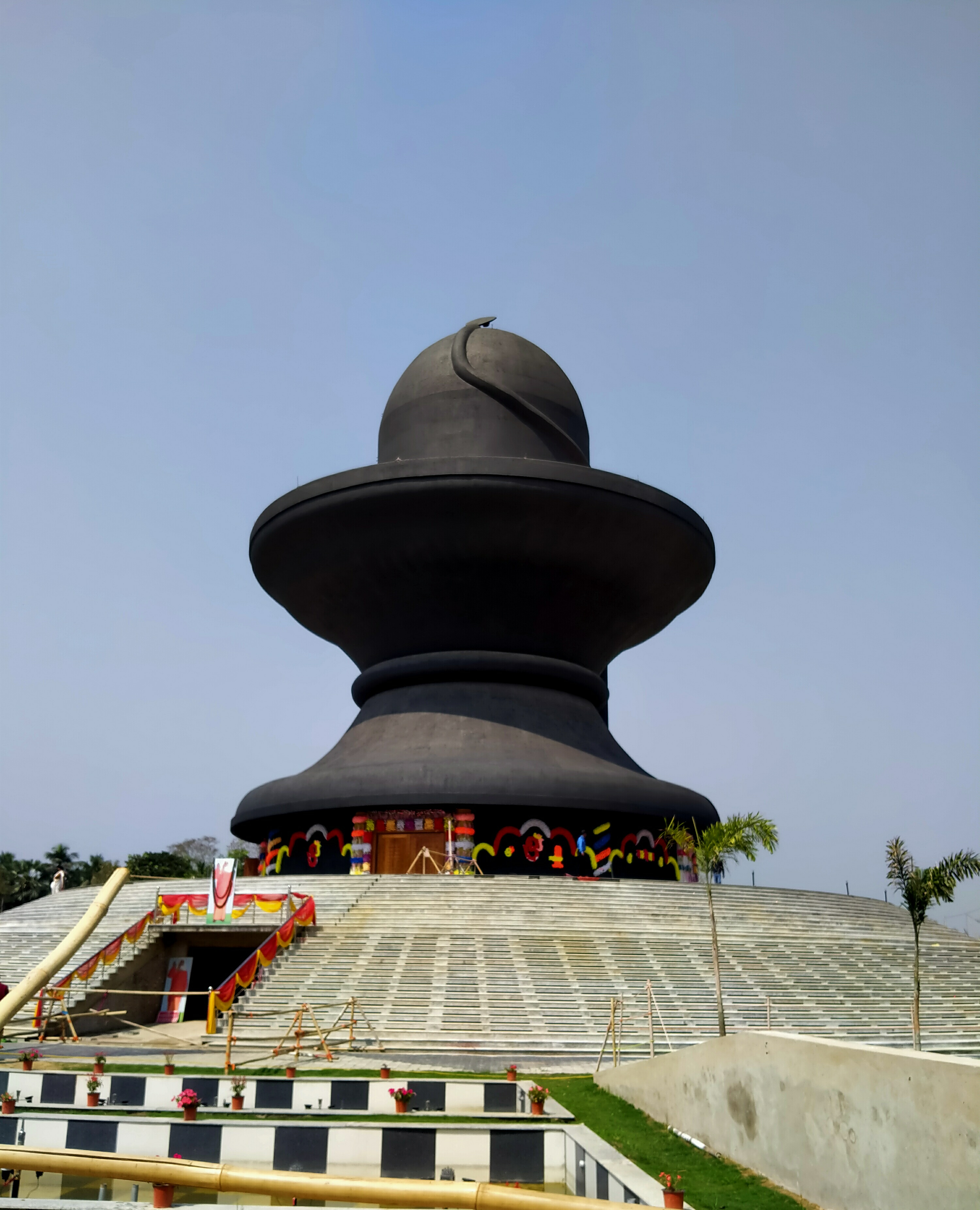
- Mahamrityunjay Temple in Nagaon, Assam, India

- Location in Assam Maha Mrityunjay Temple (India)

Religion
- Affiliation: Hinduism
- District: Nagaon
- Deity: Shiva

Location
- Location: Nagaon
- State: Assam
- Country: India
- Coordinates: 26°20′35″N 92°46′34″E

Architecture
- Completed: February 2021

Maha Mrityunjay Temple is a Hindu Temple dedicated to Hindu God Shiva, situated in Nagaon, Assam, India. This Temple is special in its architectural sense as it is built in a form a Shivling. It is the World's largest Shivalinga, at the height of 126 foot. This feature is made it unique and very attractive for the devotees.

== History ==
Construction of temple was initiated in 2003 by Acharya Bhrigu Giri Maharaj, this place is where he used to meditate and is the location where Guru Shukracharya performed Mahāmrityunjaya Mantra. Basis of this thought Acharya Bhrigu Giri Maharajas had chosen this place for temple construction (Pran Pratishta). The initial planning for the construction started in the year 2003 but after several attempts by other architects and engineers, the final engineering and design work was carried by Er. Narayan Sharma. The temple is also very significant due to reflection of mastery in engineering.

== Inauguration and Pran Pratishta Mahotsav ==
The Temple Inauguration was done by Pran Pratishta Mahotsav, worship (Puja) was started on 22 Feb and ended on 25 Feb 2021, As special guest the Union Home Minister Mr. Amit Shah, Minister of Health and Education in Assam Dr. Himanta Biswa Sarma and Ex. Chief Minister of Assam Mr. Sarbananda Sonowal had participated the puja and Yagna of Maha Mrityunjay Temple. 108 Yagna Kundas was established for the Yagna and around 250 priests came from Tamil Nadu to perform the Pran Pratishta Yagna. After completion of Pran Pratishta Yagna the Temple was opened for devotees from 26 Feb 2021.

== Location ==
Maha Mrityunjay Temple is situated in Bherbheri Gaon, Barhampur, Puranigudam Nagaon, Assam around 120 km far from heart city of Assam Guwahati.

== Earthquake effects ==
A massive earthquake reported on 28 April 2021 in Assam and NE Region measured 6.7 on the Richter scale. Due to that jolt a minor crack was observed in the upper part of 126 feet of temple which can be termed as ornamental damage and no structural damage has occurred.

== See also ==
- Sukreswar Temple
- Kamakhya Temple
