= Abani (name) =

Abani is both a given name and a surname. Notable people with the name include:

- Abani Chakraborty (1941–?), Indian poet
- Abani Mohan Joardar (died 2020), Indian politician
- Abani Mukherji (1891–1937), Indian communist
- Abani Roy (1939–2021), Indian politician
- Chris Abani (born 1966), Nigerian-American author
