= Abani =

Abani may refer to:

- Abani (name)
- Abani Bari Achho, Bengali poem
- A tribe of the Achagua people
