= C.S. O'Cinneide =

Canadian author

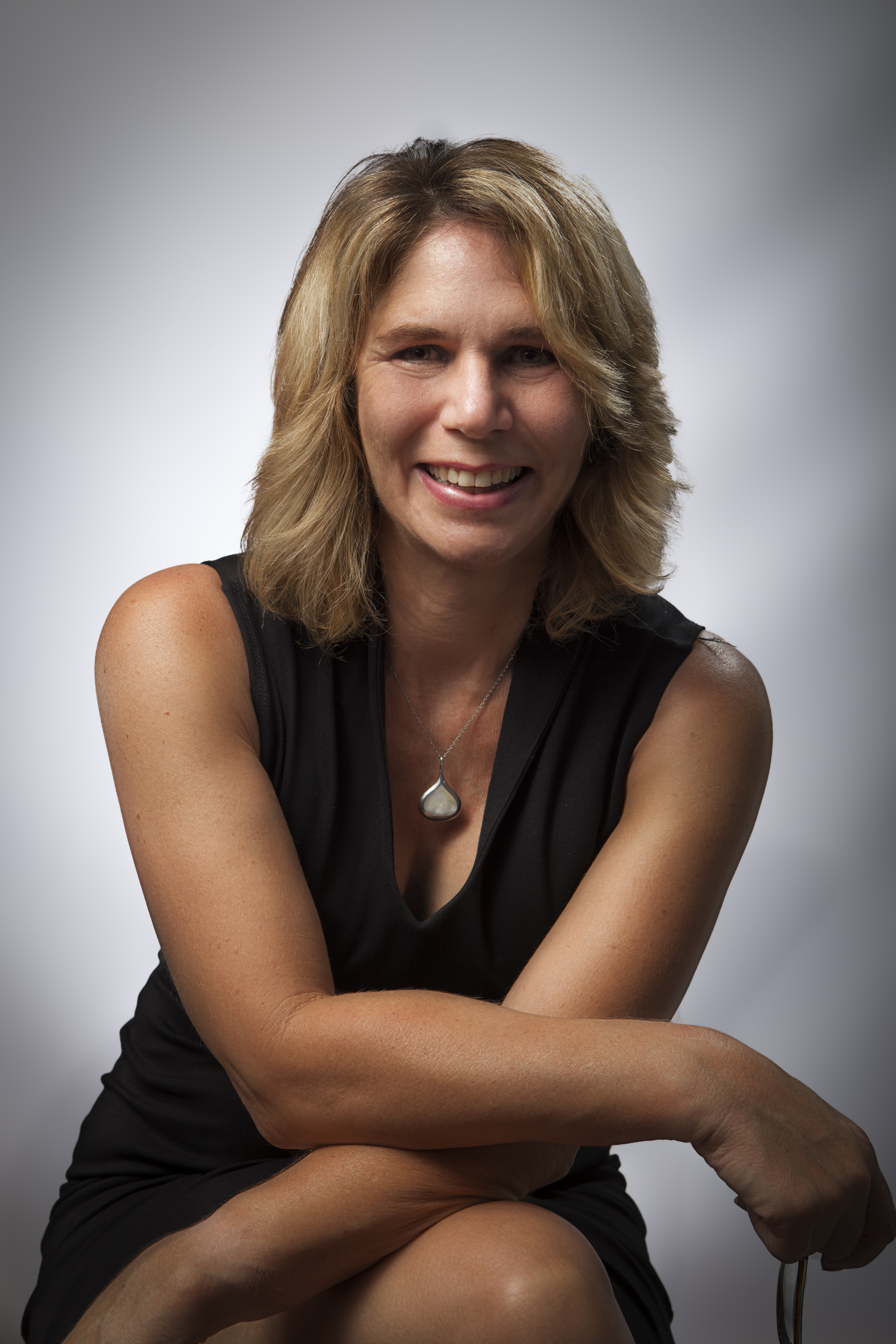
- C.S. O'Cinneide
- Born: Toronto, Ontario, Canada
- Occupation: Writer
- Writing career
- Pen name: C.S. O'Cinneide
- Genre: fiction
- Notable work: Petra's Ghost
- Website: shekillslit.com

C.S. O'Cinneide is a Canadian writer of crime fiction and literary horror, as well as the writer of a blog featuring women authors. Her debut novel, Petra's Ghost, was a semi-finalist in the Goodreads Choice Awards for 2019. Her second novel in the Candace Starr Crime series, Starr Sign, was nominated for an Edgar Award for Best Paperback Original by the Mystery Writers of America in 2022.

== Education ==
C.S. O’Cinneide was born in Toronto, Ontario and attended high schools both in Canada and the United States. She studied at the University of Toronto in the 1990s while a single parent of two children, graduating With Distinction in Sociology.

After working as an IT analyst for decades, in 2015 O’Cinneide walked the Camino de Santiago, a 500-mile pilgrimage in northern Spain. This experience, as well as the disappearance of a female pilgrim at the time, inspired her first novel, Petra's Ghost.

== Writing career ==
C.S. O’Cinneide's debut novel, Petra's Ghost was promoted as literary fiction despite appearing on multiple horror genre book lists, possibly due to a haunting that takes place as part of the story. The novel was named one of the “summer's best horror books” by the Toronto Star where it was noted for "Structuring a novel around a traditional Christian pilgrimage" despite "the overwhelmingly secular, even atheist tone of our times." Petra's Ghost was nominated for the Goodreads Choice Award for Horror in 2019.

The Starr Sting Scale, published in February 2020, was O’Cinneide's first book in a series, "that could have been written in 1940" if not for the female protagonist, a "functioning alcoholic" and former hitwoman named Candace Starr. The second book in the series, Starr Sign, was nominated in 2022 by the Mystery Writers of America for a prestigious Edgar Award in the category of Best Paperback Original. Starr Sign was the only novel written by a Canadian to be nominated in the adult fiction category in that year.

In the fall of 2022, O'Cinneide will publish her fourth novel, a domestic noir titled Eve's Rib.

Since 2018, the author has hosted the crime fiction book blog, She Kills Lit, where she showcases women writers in the thriller and noir fiction genres. She has interviewed such authors as C.J. Tudor, Denise Mina and C.J.Cooke.

== Bibliography ==
=== Novels ===
- Petra's Ghost, (2019, Dundurn Press)
- The Starr Sting Scale (2020, Dundurn Press)
- Starr Sign (2021, Dundurn Press)
- Eve's Rib (Fall 2022, Dundurn Press)

=== Short stories ===
- "Family Role Play " (2015, Seal Press)
- "Copper" (2016, Minola Review)
- "Picture This" (2016, Cantina Publishing)
- "Bad Habits" (2016, Mantid)
- "Tattler Lake Tales" (2017, CSFTS)
- "Cool Customer" (2022, Cold Canadian Crime, CWC)
