= Rajaduar =

- Village
- Location in Assam, India Rajaduar (India)
- Coordinates: 26.201873°N 91.728579°E
- Country: India
- State: Assam
- Region: Western Assam
- District: Kamrup Rural district

Government
  - Body: Gram panchayat
- Elevation: 42 m (138 ft)

Languages
  - Official: Assamese
- Time zone: UTC+5:30 (IST)
- Telephone code: 0361
- Vehicle registration: AS-25-XXXX
- Website: kamrup.nic.in

Rajaduar is a village in North Guwahati.

== Place of interest ==
The Doul Govinda Temple is located here. Chandra Bharati hills, near the Doul Govinda Temple, was the abode of medieval litterateur Chandra Bharati.

== See also ==
- Guwakuchi
