= Woman with a Blue Pencil =

2015 novel by Gordon McAlpine

Woman with a Blue Pencil is a 2015 metafictional mystery novel by Gordon McAlpine. It was first published by Prometheus Books, via their Seventh Street imprint.

== Synopsis ==
On December 6, 1941, Sam Sumida is a Japanese-American academic in Los Angeles, whose hunt for the murderer of his wife is disrupted when he finds himself six weeks in the future, in a world where no one remembers he ever existed... because, in the aftermath of the attack on Pearl Harbor, the novel whose protagonist he was has been rewritten.

Elsewhere, Maxine Wakefield is an editor of mystery novels, writing letters to Takumi Sato — one of her authors, who is now in a Japanese internment camp — in which she explains that American readers will no longer accept the notion of a Japanese hero pursuing a white criminal, and coaxes Sato into rewriting his novel so that it is about Jimmy Park, a Korean-American private detective hunting Japanese spies.

== Reception ==
The novel was a finalist for the 2016 Edgar Allan Poe Award for Best Paperback Original.

In a starred review, Publishers Weekly praised McAlpine for his "masterly critique" of the mystery genre, and emphasized that the novel "works both as a conventional mystery story and as a deconstruction of the genre's ideology", such that regardless of whether readers follow Sam or Jimmy, "the parallel stories pack a brutal punch." The Historical Novel Society called it "superb" and "highly recommended".

Paste noted that the excerpts from The Revised [the novel featuring Sam] and The Orchid and the Secret Agent [the novel featuring Jimmy] show that both are "fast-paced, rip-roaring reads", and lauded McAlpine for the "sequencing of excerpts and letters", such that when "an excerpt from The Orchid and the Secret Agent (...) contains a particularly heavy-handed bit of patriotic grandstanding or xenophobic bile, or a dropped-in detail that seems ridiculously out of place," it is followed immediately by "the missive from the editor that mandated its inclusion."

The Los Angeles Review of Books found it to be a "thrill to read", and an "ingeniously structured metafictional noir of surprising depth" which "critiqu[es] the art and artifice of writing, editing, and publishing", and observed that the three narratives affect each other, with "the Orchid" (the "dragon lady caricature" who commands the "network of Japanese assassins" that Jimmy must infiltrate) being recognizably based on Sam's murdered wife, and Sam's former home being filled with photos of Jimmy.
