= Smoking the Bible =

2022 poetry collection by Chris Abani

- First edition cover
- Author: Chris Abani
- Publisher: Copper Canyon Press
- Publication date: May 2022
- ISBN: 978-1-556-59628-5

Smoking the Bible is a 2022 poetry collection by Chris Abani.

In a review for Harvard Review, Rhony Bhopla wrote that Smoking the Bible "stands out with its emphasis on the importance of ancestral language and ritual practices, reminding readers that the joy of reading poetry is first and foremost the experience of language". The book was longlisted for the PEN/Voelcker Award for Poetry.
