= Walter Sorrells =

American author of mystery and suspense novels

- Born: 1962 (age 63–64); Nashville, Tennessee, U.S.
- Education: Haverford College
- Spouse: Patti Sorrells
- Children: a
- Writing career
- Pen name: Lynn Ambercrombie, Ruth Birmingham
- Notable awards: Edgar Allan Poe Award for Best Paperback Original
- Website: www.waltersorrells.com

Walter Sorrells is an American author of mystery and suspense novels for adults and teens, who also writes under the pseudonyms Lynn Abercrombie and Ruth Birmingham. He also hand-forges swords and knives in the Japanese style.

Sorrells has written many novels, including Fake I.D., named one of the ten Best Mysteries by Booklist magazine in 2005 and several novels based-on the television series Flight 29 Down.

His novel Fulton County Blues, as Ruth Birmingham, won the 2000 Edgar Allan Poe Award for Best Paperback Original.

== Personal life ==
Sorrells was born in 1962 in Nashville, Tennessee. He graduated from Haverford College in 1985, where he majored in history.

He is married to Patti Sorrells, and the couple have a son, Jake. They live in Atlanta.

Sorrells holds a third-degree black belt in Japanese Shito-ryu karate and has studied Brazilian jiujitsu, aikido, and Tai Chi. He has also studied Okinawan kobudō, the weapon systems of Okinawan martial arts, as well as the Japanese sword arts of Iaido and Shinkendo.

Additionally, Sorrells is a competitive pistol shooter.

== Career ==
Sorrells began writing novels in his mid-twenties and published his first novel, Power of Attorney, in 1994.

Aside from writing, Sorrells handcrafts elaborate knives and swords. He began "making blades as research for a character: “The novel died, but the pursuit lived,” he stated.

== Awards and honors ==
Year	Title	Award	Result	Ref.
1995	Power of Attorney	Edgar Allan Poe Award for Best Paperback Original	Finalist	
1999	Atlanta Graves	Edgar Allan Poe Award for Best Paperback Original	Finalist	
2000	Fulton County Blues	Edgar Allan Poe Award for Best Paperback Original	Winner	
2000	Fulton County Blues	Shamus Award for Best Original PI Paperback	Nominee	

== Publications ==
=== Cold Case Thriller series (as Lynn Abercrombie) ===
- The Body Box (2005)
- Blind Fear (2006)

=== Flight 29 Down series (as Walter Sorrells) ===
- Ten Rules adaptation, created by D.J. MacHale and Stan Rogow (2006)
- Static adaptation, created by D.J. MacHale and Stan Rogow (2006)
- Scratch adaptation, created by D.J. MacHale and Stan Rogow (2006)
- On Fire adaptation, created by D.J. MacHale and Stan Rogow (2007)
- Survival adaptation, created by D.J. MacHale and Stan Rogow (2007)

=== Pendragon: Before the War series (as Walter Sorrells) ===
- The Travelers: Book Two (2009)
- The Travelers: Book Three, with D. J. MacHale (2009)

=== Hunted series (as Walter Sorrells) ===
- Fake ID (2005)
- Club Dread (2006)
- Whiteout (2009)

=== Standalone novels (as Walter Sorrells) ===
- Power of Attorney (1994)
- Cry for Justice (1996)
- Will to Murder (1996)
- The Silent Room (2006)
- First Shot (2007)
- Erratum (2008)

=== Sunny Childs Mystery series (as Ruth Birmingham) ===
- Atlanta Graves (1998)
- Fulton County Blues (1999)
- Sweet Georgia (2000)
- Blue Plate Special (2001)
- Cold Trail (2002)
- Feet of Clay (2006)
