= Hell's Kitchen (novel) =

2001 novel by Jeffery Deaver

- First edition (publ. Pocket Books)
- Author: Jeffery Deaver
- Publisher: Pocket Books
- Publication date: February 1, 2001
- ISBN: 9780671047511

Hell's Kitchen is a 2001 novel by American author Jeffery Deaver. It is the third novel that follows location scout John Pellam.

The novel was shortlisted for the 2002 Edgar Allan Poe Award for Best Paperback Original.

== Plot summary ==
The book follows Pellam as he tries to prove the innocence of an old woman, Ettie, whom he had interviewed for a documentary on the area of New York City referred to as Hell's Kitchen. When Ettie's apartment catches fire, she is blamed for the crime and jailed. Pellam believes she is innocent and is determined to prove it and set her free. Along the way he meets several characters who try to interrupt his search as it uncovers many underlying crimes of different people. All the while, the real arsonist, a man named Sonny, has been continuing to burn buildings and chase Pellam.

Towards the end of the book, Sonny finally confronts Pellam, attempting to kill him (and Sonny himself in the process). However, just when it appears Pellam is about to die, two friends he has made along his investigation come to his aid and save him from Sonny. Pellam gathers the evidence needed to prove Ettie innocent and she is set free.
