= Abani Chakraborty =

Indian poet

Abani Chakravarty
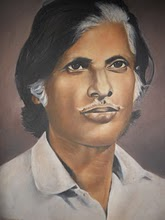
- Portrait of Poet Abani Chakravarty made by Shubhakar Laskar
- Born: 3 January 1941
- Disappeared: 12 November 1994 (aged 53); Gauhati
- Status: Missing for 31 years, 9 months and 17 days

Abani Chakravarty was an Indian humanitarian poet of the late twentieth century Assamese literature. Apart from original poetry his works included two novelettes and translations of the third-world poetry.

== Early life ==
Chakravarty was born in Nalbari subdivision (now Nalbari district) of Undivided Kamrup district of Assam, India on 3 January 1941 to a Brahmin family. Abani started contributing to the Assamese literature prolifically in the 1960s and continued to do so until the 1990s. He was influential in the world of Assamese poetry and literature before he disappeared on a cold Saturday evening on 12 November 1994 from his Kharguli residence in Guwahati.

== Works ==
Chakravarty published a number of books including poetry anthologies, translations and two novelettes. He published his poems in most of the major Assamese newspapers and magazines. His books were primarily published by publishers based in Assam apart from his own publication Kabita Prakashan(কবিতা প্ৰকাশন).

Abani was the joint editor for the Assamese magazine Antaranga(অন্তৰংগ) (meaning "The Intimate", six-monthly, 1969), Asomiya Kabita(অসমীয়া কবিতা) ("The Assamese Poetry", monthly, 1970) and the editor of Chirantan(চিৰন্তন) ("The Eternal", three-monthly, 1972). Pratibadar Kantha(প্ৰতিবাদৰ কন্ঠ) ("The Voice of Rebellion", recorded in 1985), a cassette of recitation of his poems, was the first ever cassette of recitation of Assamese poetry. His anthologies are Deha Romeromai Mor(দেহা ৰমেৰমাই মোৰ) (1970), Slogan(শ্লোগান)(1980), Kabikantha(কবিকন্ঠ) (1987), autobiographical novelette Sankardev Uddyan, Si aru Apurba(শংকৰদেৱ উদ্যান, সি আৰু অপূৰ্ব) (1990), edited anthologies Britta Bhangar Samay (বৃত্ত ভঙাৰ সময়)(1972), Ai Samay(এই সময়) (1972), Parashu Goswamir Kabita (1989)(পৰশু গোস্বামীৰ কবিতা) and Amulya Baruar Jeevan aru Kabita(অমূল্য বৰুৱাৰ জীৱন আৰু কবিতা) (1990).

The books that were jointly edited, translated and compiled are Mao Tse Tungar Kabita (মাও চে টু্ঙৰ কবিতা)(1979), Tung Pi Ur Kabita (টুং পি উৰ কবিতা)(1979), Ho Tsi Minar Kabita(হো চি মিনৰ কবিতা) (1979), Krishnanga Kabir Kabita(কৃষ্ণাংগ কবিৰ কবিতা) (1982), Faiz Ahmad Faizar Kabita(ফয়্জ আহমদ ফয়্জৰ কবিতা) (1985) and Musa Jalilar Kabita(মুছা জালিলৰ কবিতা) (1987).

== Books about Abani Chakravarty ==
Since Abani's disappearance, several books have been published about him. These include: Abani Chakravartir Nirbachita Kabita(অৱনী চক্ৰৱৰ্তীৰ নিৰ্বাচিত কবিতা) (published by Puthi Niketan in 1996), Abani Chakravartir Swa Nirbachita Kabita Sankalan (অৱনী চক্ৰৱৰ্তীৰ স্ব নিৰ্বাচিত কবিতা সংকলন)(published by Friends Publication in 2004), Abani Chakravarty: Smriti aru Sristi(অৱনী চক্ৰৱৰ্তী: স্মৃতি আৰু সৃষ্টি) (published by Kabita Prakashan in 2009) and Swapno Ke Saath Ek Din Thitholi (सपनो के साथ एक दिन ठिठोली) (A Hindi translation of a few selected poems of Abani Chakravarty by Dinkar Kumar, published by Kabita Prakashan in 2010). A special edition of the Hindi magazine Ulupi focused on Chakravarty came out in 2004.

== Website on Abani Chakravarty ==
A website on Poet Abani Chakravarty https://poetabani.com was launched on 3 January 2018 by the poet's family. It was inaugurated by Sahitya Akademy awardee poet Gyan Pujari at Gahpur, Assam.

== See also ==
- List of people who disappeared mysteriously (2000–present)
