= Chandra Bharati hills =

Hills in North Guwahati, India

Chandra Bharati hills are a series of hills located in North Guwahati.

== Etymology ==
These hills are an abode of medieval litterateur Chandra Bharati after which it was named.

== Place of interest ==
The Doul Govinda Temple located on its foothills is a major tourist place.

== See also ==
- Bhattadeva
