= To the River =

2024 crime novel by Australian author Vikki Wakefield

- Author: Vikki Wakefield
- Language: English
- Genre: Crime novel
- Publisher: Text Publishing
- Publication date: 27 February 2024
- Publication place: Australia
- Media type: Print
- Pages: 400
- Awards: 2025 Davitt Award, Best Adult Crime Novel, winner; 2026 Edgar Allan Poe Award for Best Paperback Original, winner
- ISBN: 9781915798312

To the River is a 2024 crime novel by Australian author Vikki Wakefield. It was originally published in Australia by Text Publishing, followed by No Exit Press in the UK, and Poisoned Pen Press in the US under the title The Backwater.

It was the winner of the Best Adult Novel Davitt Award in 2025.

== Synopsis ==
Sabine Kelly's mother and sister were killed in a caravan fire when she was just 17. Sabine was arrested for their murders, plus the seven others that died in the blaze, but she escaped custody and has been on the run for 12 years.

Journalist Rachel has been made redundant from her job, is in the middle of a divorce and has always been fascinated by the caravan fire. She tracks down Sabine and the two work to tell the true story of the fire, each for their own ends.

== Critical reception ==
On the Books+Publishing website reviewer Brenton Cullen wrote: "Mixing in psychological warfare between two incredibly cataclysmic main characters, this is an action-packed, exciting, yet often thoughtful book."

Karen Chisholm, for AustCrimeFiction, called the novel an "interesting combination of a psychological thriller, with a couple of flawed, but engaging and very sympathetic central female characters".

== Awards ==
- 2025 Davitt Award, Readers Choice, winner
- 2026 Edgar Allan Poe Award for Best Paperback Original, winner

== See also ==
- 2024 in Australian literature
