= Shree Shyam Mandir, Guwahati =

- The presiding deity at the temple

- Location within Guwahati Shree Shyam Mandir, Guwahati (Assam) Shree Shyam Mandir, Guwahati (India)

Religion
- Affiliation: Hinduism
- District: Kamrup Metropolitan
- Deity: Khatushyamji or Shyam baba
- Festivals: Kartik Shukla Ekadashi, Falgun Shukla Ekadashi, 14 April (Inauguration Day)

Location
- Location: Guwahati
- State: Assam
- Country: India
- Interactive map of Shree Shyam Mandir, Guwahati
- Coordinates: 26.17904°N 91.74361°E

Architecture
- Architect: Shri Santosh Ji Banka
- Type: Mandir architecture
- Creator: Acharya Mahant Shri Pandit Gopal Sharma (Head Priest)
- Completed: 14 April 2016; 10 years ago

Shree Shyam Mandir, Guwahati is a temple located in Chatribari, one of the main trade hubs in the Indian city of Guwahati. It has His Supremacy, Shri Khatushyamji or Shyam baba as the presiding deity and many sub-temples dedicated to other deities viz. Shri Ganeshji, Biyala's sati dadi or Bajawa ki sati dadi, Shri Bajrang Bali, Shri Shiva Parivar, Shri Lakshmi Mata, Shri Rani Sati Dadiji, and Shri Santoshi Maa. The temple is visited by hundreds of Shyam Bhakts daily, especially during Aartis and a larger number on Ekadashis and a still larger number on the Shukla paksha Ekadashis of the Kartik, Falgun and Margshirsh months of the Hindu lunar calendar.

== Brief history ==
The work on the gifted land in Chatribari for building the temple started in the later part of 2009. The temple was built by Shri Pandit Gopal Sharma with the help and support of Shyam Bhakts in Guwahati.

== Inauguration ceremony ==
The inauguration ceremony was a seven-day long observance from 8 to 14 April 2016, which included havans, Kalash yatras, and abhisheks. People of all ages and religion were a part of the function. The neighbourhood of Chatribari and its neighbouring areas were spruced up with lamps and decoratives. The entire Guwahati city was in a festive mood during the period of inauguration of the temple.

== Other deities ==
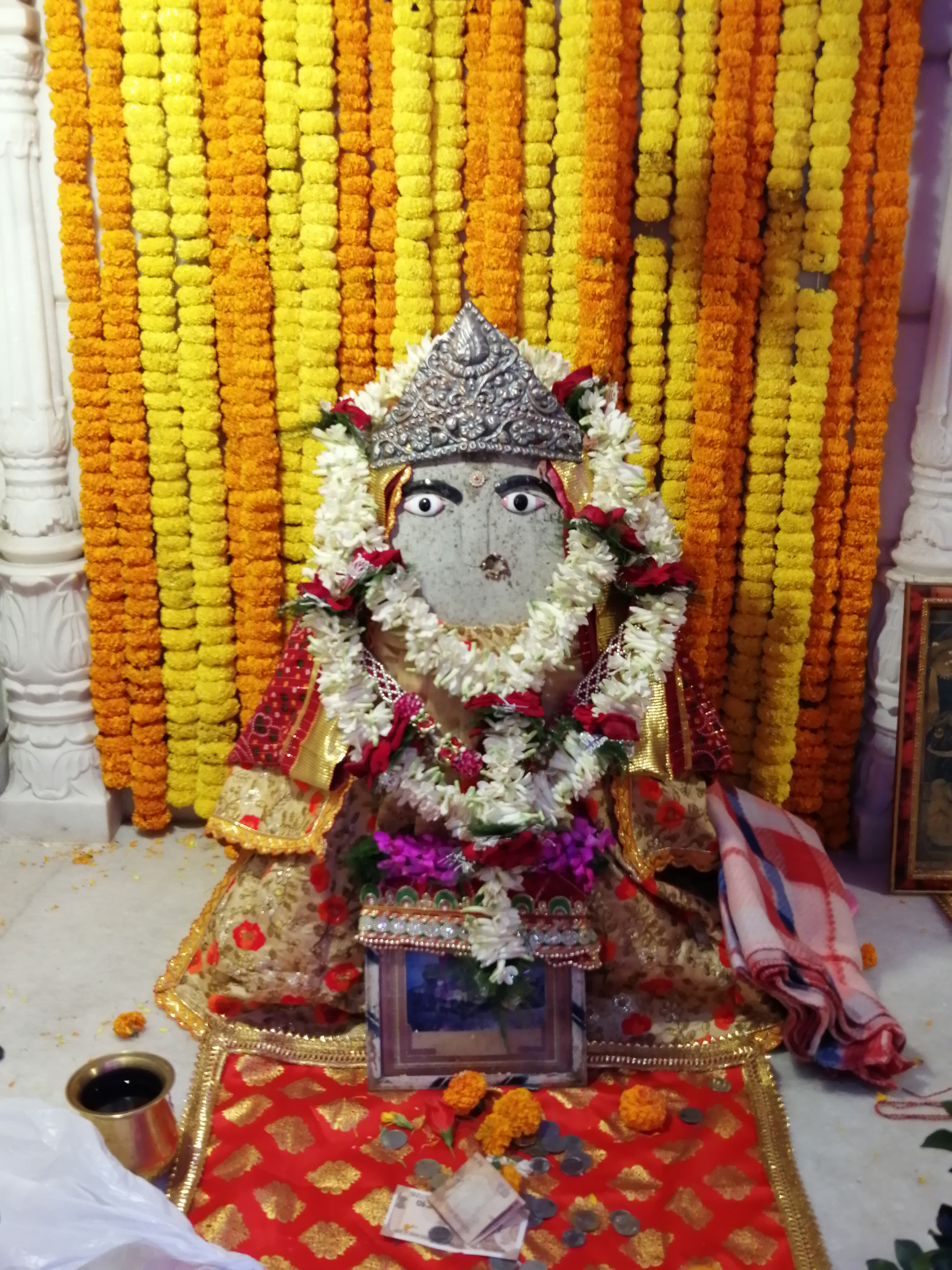
Bajawa's sati dadi

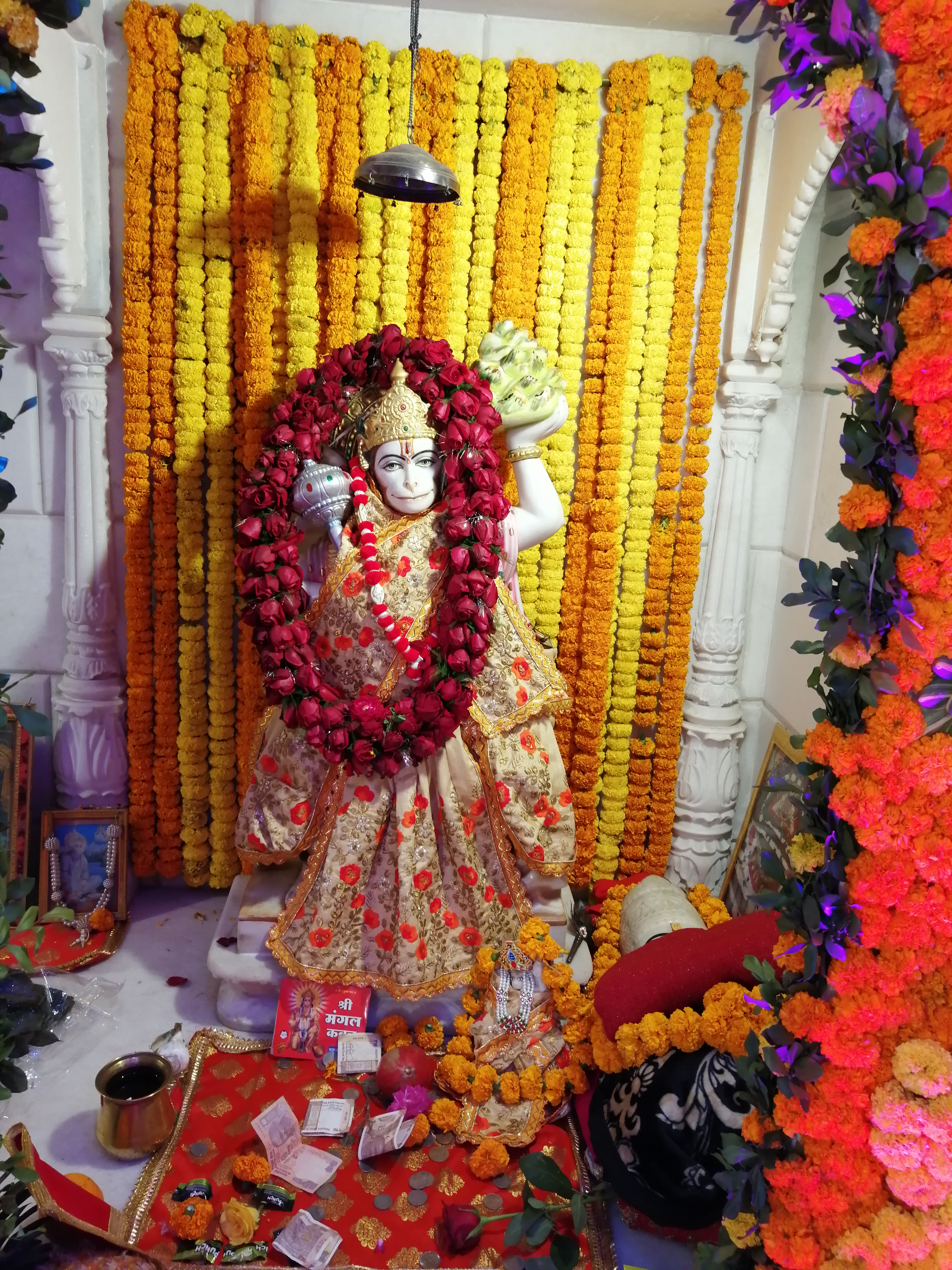
Shri Hanumanji

Shri Shiv Parivar

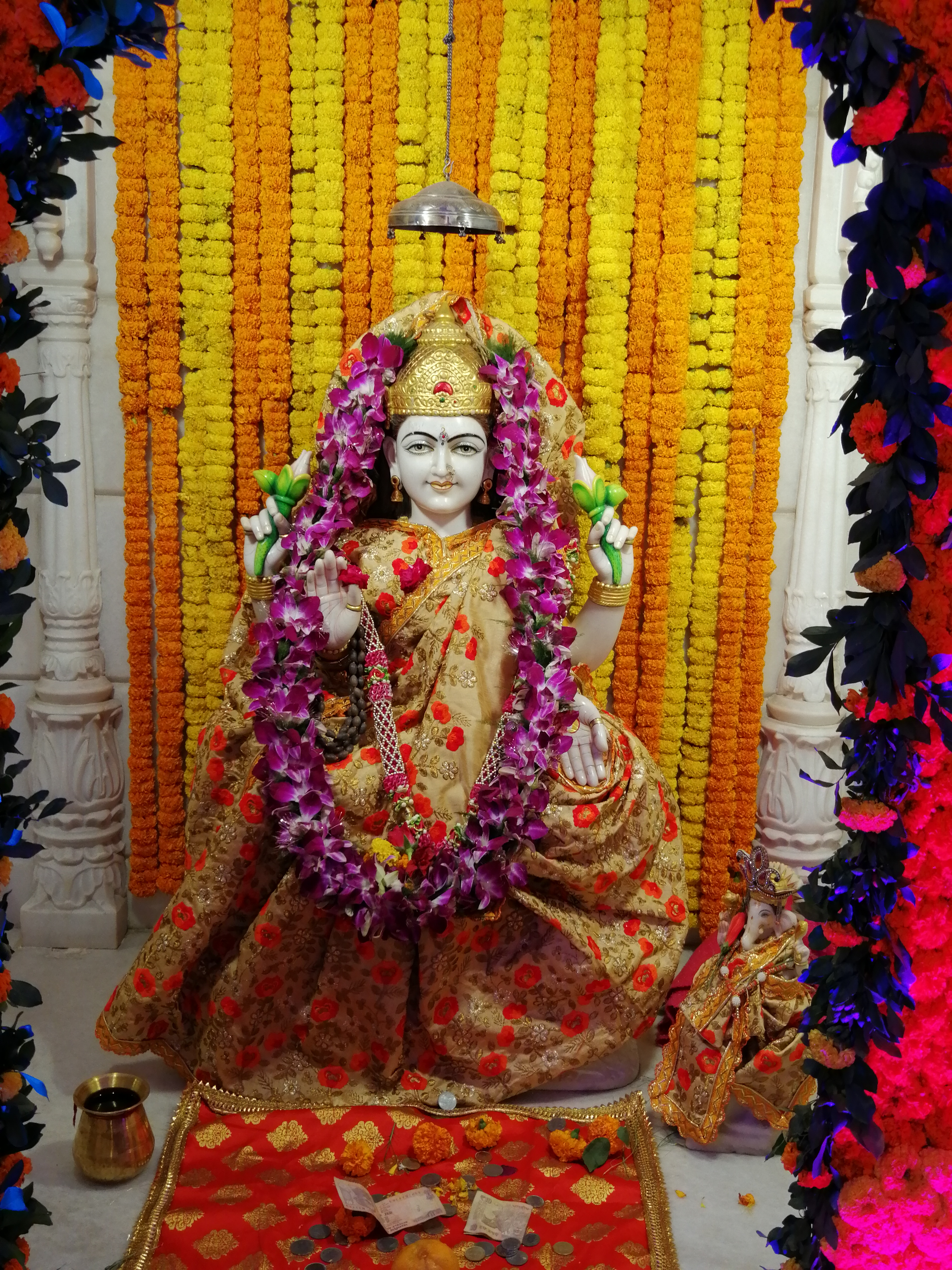
Lakshmi Maa

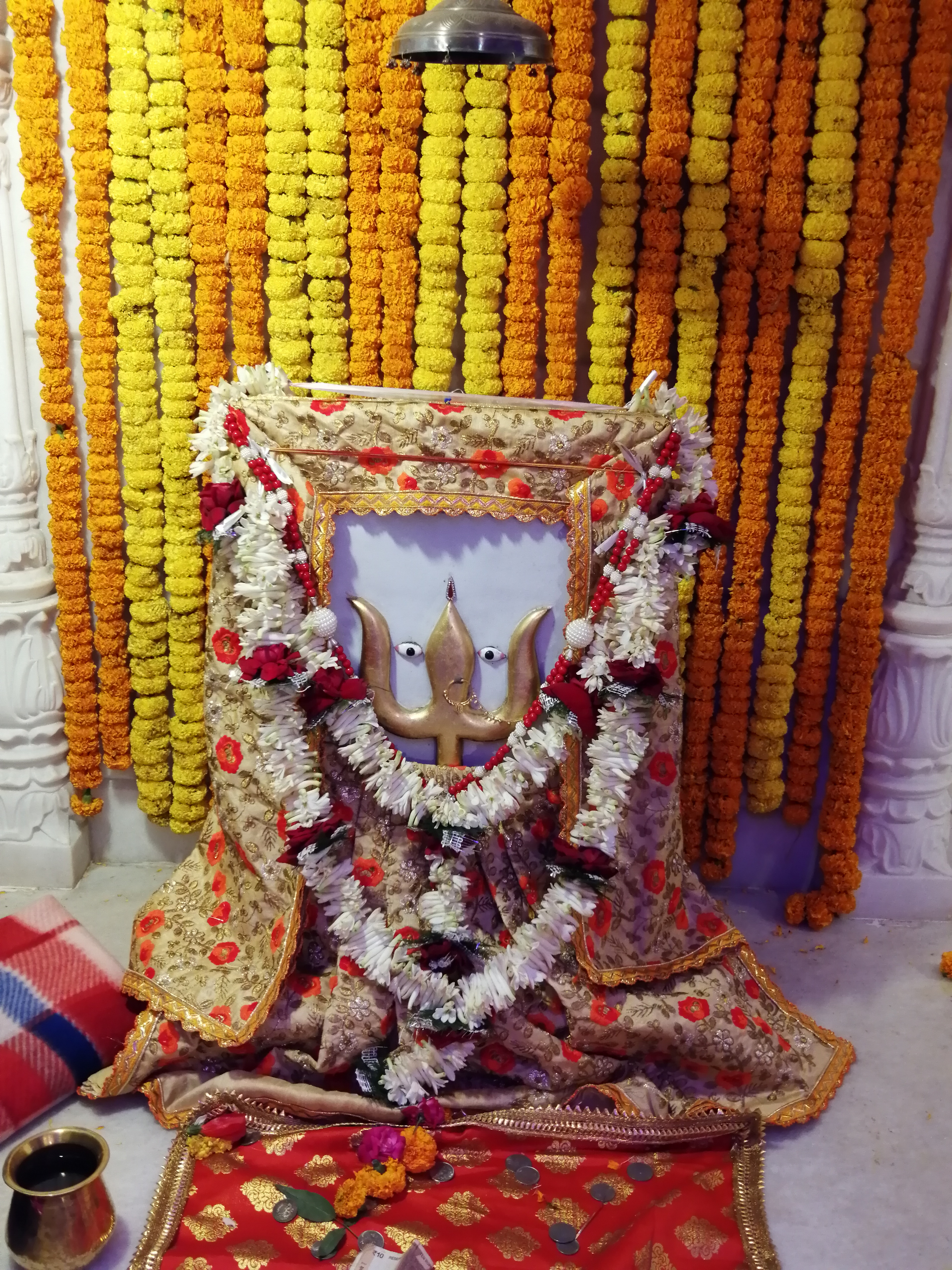
Rani Sati Dadi

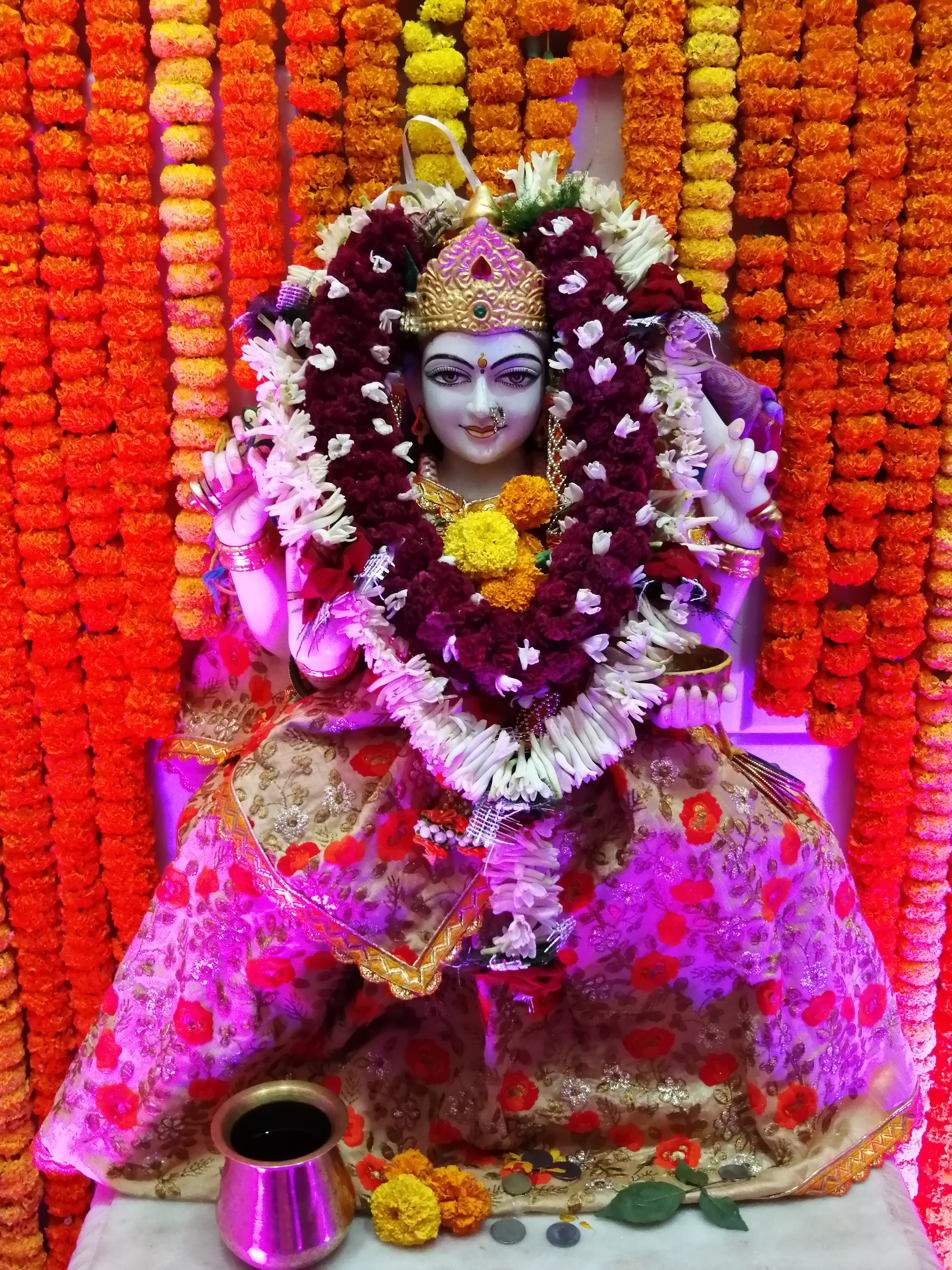
Santoshi Mata

== Temple timings ==
The temple remains open from 6:00 a.m. to 1:00 p.m. and 3:45 pm to 10:00 p.m.

Aarti timings
Aartis	Summers	Winters
Mangla Aarti	6:15 a.m.	6:40 a.m.
Shringar Aarti	7:30 a.m.	8:00 a.m.
Bhog Aarti	12:15 p.m.	12:00 noon
Sandhya Aarti	7:30 p.m.	7:00 p.m.
Shayan Aarti	9:30 p.m.	9:00 p.m.
