= The Midas Coffin =

1975 novel by Martin Cruz Smith

First edition (publ. Dell Books)

The Midas Coffin is a novel by Martin Cruz Smith published under the pseudonym Simon Quinn in 1975. It was fifth of six installments in a series titled The Inquisitor. The entire series was published inside a two-year span between 1974 and 1975. The novel's protagonist is a former CIA agent named Francis Xavier Killy who has become a lay brother in the Militia Christi. The novel follows Killy as he tries to track down a killer among a group of fanatics while trying to handle a train heist orchestrated by a former colleague. It was nominated by the Mystery Writers of America for an Edgar Award in the category of Best Paperback Original Novel, Smith's third Edgar nomination.

== Plot ==
A suicide bomber named Ivan Bolotny attempts to destroy Lenin's Mausoleum but ends up killing himself in a locked room. Shortly thereafter, his brother is murdered, and a bishop named Nescou goes missing. The Militia Christi is tasked by the Catholic Church with solving the crime due to potential church member involvement, and their lay brother Francis Killey is sent to Switzerland to track down Nescou. While there, Killey encounters Carlin, a former colleague of the British Secret Service, who has partnered with a Russian massage therapist named Marya. It is revealed that Marya, Nescou, and the Bolotny brothers were members of a fanatical anti-sex sect called Skoptsy. Carlin, not part of the sect, tells Killey he left the Secret Service after inheriting money and stealing a titaniumpatent. His company went bankrupt, prompting him to plan a train heist with Killey's help. Killey informs his superior, Cella, who approves the plan. The heist involves breaking into a stationary Russian train to steal gold bullion and replace it with gold-plated lead. Despite success, the Skoptsy ambush Killey. Nescou tries to kill Killey but fails. Killey reports to Cella and is sent to Russia to find Nescou and the gold in Sochi. While in a mud bath, Killey discovers the gold is hidden under the baths. Nescou attempts to drown Killey, but Killey submerges him first. Killey returns to Switzerland, expecting Carlin, who intends to dilute the gold's quality. Killey tracks Carlin to a smelting plant. They confront each other, revealing Carlin's ignorance of the ambush. Killey mentions the grandson of the man whose patent Carlin stole seeks revenge. The man enters and shoots Carlin. Killey returns to Rome, meets his former girlfriend, and tells his partner Mario he plans to ensure her happiness and rescue her if needed.
