= GraceLand =

2004 novel by Chris Abani

- First edition hardcover
- Author: Chris Abani
- Language: English
- Publisher: Farrar, Straus and Giroux
- Publication date: February 15, 2004
- Publication place: Nigeria
- Media type: Print (Hardcover and Paperback)
- Pages: 336 pp
- ISBN: 0-374-16589-0
- Followed by: The Secret History of Las Vegas

GraceLand is a 2004 novel by Chris Abani, which tells the story of a teenager named Elvis, who is trying to get out of the ghettos of Lagos, Nigeria. Chris Abani depicts the poverty and violence in Lagos and how it affects the everyday lives of Elvis and his family. Having emigrated from Nigeria himself as a result of the Biafran War, Abani's novel touches on many issues relevant to corruption, poverty, and violence within the country. Elvis's story also touches on issues related to globalization, and how Nigeria's impoverished communities are affected by this phenomenon. The main focus of this story is on Elvis and how he survives in the often harsh environment that is Nigeria's largest city; Elvis himself is a complex and sympathetic character who clearly cares for his family despite a turbulent upbringing. However, this is complicated by the numerous illegal and morally questionable jobs he takes part in with his friend Redemption.

== Plot summary ==
Set in the Nigerian city of Lagos, GraceLand is the story of a teenage boy named Elvis Oke, who is trying to escape the poverty of his community. Starting out as an Elvis Presley impersonator, he takes on a wide variety of jobs, many of which place him in criminal situations.

The novel jumps between two settings, the village of Afikpo from 1972 until 1981, and Lagos from 1983 and onward. This allows readers to observe the shifting nature of Elvis' family dynamic, which changes drastically after the death of his mother and his subsequent move to Lagos. The complexities of maintaining familial and cultural ties in a modernizing society is brought up as well, which is mirrored in the dramatic fragmentation of Elvis' family as the novel progresses.

In Lagos, Elvis is torn between the influences of two characters: his friend Redemption, and the self-proclaimed King of Beggars. Many of the illegal ventures that Elvis partakes in are due to Redemption's influence, and these escapades often lead to conflict with a man known as the Colonel, a prominent and corrupt member of a brutal military regime. The King of Beggars, on the other hand, attempts to direct Elvis to a different path. His presence throughout the novel serves as a crude, and often ignored, moral compass.

Towards the end of the novel, the story briefly diverts its attention from Elvis to take on a slightly larger scope. It depicts the struggle of Elvis's community in resisting the demolition of its home. Elvis’ father and the King of Beggars both play prominent roles in leading the community in protests against the corrupt government's crackdown on the impoverished residents of the slum.

== Characters ==
Since the novel frequently alternates between the present of 1983 in Lagos, and during the past of Afikpo from 1972 until 1981, it is important to separate both time periods.

Present: Lagos 1983 :

- Elvis: Elvis is an avid dancer and an Elvis impersonator. Not having completed school, he attempts to survive in the chaotic Lagos by making a living for himself. Inexperienced and naive, he meets all kinds of individuals in Lagos, who greatly influence his actions throughout the novel.
- Sunday: Elvis’ father. Fallen from grace and broken hearted, he spends most of his time drinking. He used to be severe on Elvis when he was young, causing Elvis to lose all respect for his father. He barely cares about his new wife, Elvis' stepmother
- Comfort: Elvis’ stepmother. She dislikes Elvis but is loyal to his father despite his faults.
- Tunji, Akin and Tope: Comfort's children. They regard Elvis with respect.
- Redemption: Ill-behaved, roguish friend of Elvis. He take Elvis under his wing and teaches him how to survive and adapt to a criminal lifestyle. Redemption is an expert at making connections with the people who will serve his purposes; he is not afraid of committing illegal actions to make ends meet.
- King of Beggars: One eyed beggar that Elvis meets on the streets of Lagos. He has a dark past and tries to give season and warn Elvis of the dangers of Lagos and frequenting shady characters.
- The Colonel: In charge of the security at Lagos. He is corrupt, impulsive and extremely violent. He does not hesitate to abuse his powers in his notoriously horrible fashion for monetary gain.

Past, Afikpo 1972 until 1981:

- Joseph: Elvis’ Uncle, wealthy and crooked.
- Beatrice: Elvis’ mother, afflicted with breast cancer from which she dies.
- Innocence: Elvis's eldest cousin, child soldier. He takes part in a crooked scheme with uncle Joseph.
- Oye : Elvis’ grandmother, Beatrice's mother. She support Beatrice through her sickness and tries to comfort Elvis.
- Felicia: Elvis’ aunt. She shares a wicked past with Elvis, and helps him to cope with the death of his mother.
- Efua: Elvis’ cousin. They both share intimate and painful memories. Felicia speculates that Efua followed Elvis to Lagos.
- Confusion : town jock, who Elvis regarded highly given the fact that he had the courage to do what he loved as a living.

== Themes ==
=== Globalization ===
GraceLand addresses the topic of globalization in a number of ways throughout the novel. Largely set in Lagos, Nigeria between the 1970s and 1980s, the story takes place at time where modernization and western culture conflict with traditional modes of thought. The novel can often be seen as critical of the foreign influences that operate within Nigeria. The western influences in GraceLand often work in exploitative manners, such as American cigarette companies distributing their products to children in movie theaters. The description of how the World Bank takes advantage of the Nigerian people under humanitarian pretenses is also a clear indictment of globalization. However, it is necessary to observe that global influences also have positive implications in certain areas of the book. For example, it is only the presence of foreign journalists that prevent the Colonel from massacring the protesters at the end of the novel.

=== Poverty ===
The novel traces the trajectory taken by Elvis in an attempt to make a living in a slum in Lagos. Elvis' story shows how difficult making a living can be in impoverished societies, particularly in cases where the regime is a brutal military dictatorship. Elvis goes through a number of jobs, which grow increasingly desperate as the novel progresses. After failing to succeed as a street performer, Elvis goes from being a laborer, to a male escort, to an unwitting human trafficker, and finally to working as a caretaker of young beggars and living on the street. In addition to this, the events at the novel's conclusion expose the problems that arise when members of a community with no economic resources and nowhere to go are forced out of their homes. The reader sees how the demolition of one slum in an attempt to attack all the "centers of poverty and crime." in Lagos simply results in the expansion of another, with no attention given to the underlying issues of poverty that cause these slums and high crime rates.

=== Criminality ===
A large part of the novel is concerned with the concept of criminality. This includes murder, corruption, rape, drug smuggling, human trafficking, child prostitution, torture, and theft. Elvis's role in many of the aforementioned criminal acts brings to light the questions of culpability and innocence. Elvis continues to participate in shady activities with his friend Redemption's encouragement, which culminates in his involvement in a heinous human trafficking venture. The theme of criminality, which is also addressed through a number of other characters, is useful in discussing the justifications of crime. For Elvis, his criminal activities are motivated by his desire to lift himself out of poverty. Sunday's role in having his nephew Godfrey killed off on the other hand, raises the question of how honor killings can still function in a modern society.

== Critical reception ==
GraceLand has been well received in the Western literary world. When asked for a book recommendation for The Today Show's January selection, writer Walter Mosley recommended GraceLand. Both authors were featured in a discussion on the show, which helped it gain additional renown.

Publishers Weekly highlighted its two-fold ability to tell the story of Elvis, and the larger issues of poverty and globalization: "Relating how an innocent child grows into a hardened young man, the novel also gives a glimpse into a world foreign to most readers-a brutal Third World country permeated by the excesses and wonders of American popular culture…The book is most powerful when it refrains from polemic and didacticism and simply follows its protagonist on his daily journey through the violent, harsh Nigerian landscape."

An equally positive review came from Booklist, which congratulated Abani by stating: "The novel offers a vibrant picture of an alien yet somehow parallel culture, and while the plot runs off the rails from time to time, the mix of surrealistic horror and cross-cultural humor is irresistible. Abani is a first novelist with a very bright future."

However, other reviews, such as Kirkus Reviews, had a slightly more critical view on the novel, stating: "Unfortunately, the factual background is superior to the author's fictional gifts; the grim story of the Oke family arouses our pity but fails to evoke a more active empathy that would enable readers to see their own yearnings and failures in the rather schematic characters. Worth reading for its searing depiction of modern Africa, but Abani is no Chinua Achebe."

Sophie Harrison from The New York Times Book Review also had some complaints. She heavily criticizes the novel's seemingly extraneous cultural material as chapter headings and the Nigerian recipes scattered throughout. She also comments that "...the horrors of [Elvis' life] are never really assimilated into the book's imaginative structure, and the author's interest in showing us his little-written-about world pulls GraceLand persistently in the direction of nonfiction." Like most other reviewers, however, she ends on an overall positive note, calling it "awkward and original but ultimately worthwhile."

GraceLand has won a host of awards, including the 2005 Hemingway Foundation/PEN Award and Hurston/Wright Legacy Award, was the Silver Medalist for the California Book Award, was a finalist for the Los Angeles Times Book Prize and Commonwealth Writers Prize, and was shortlisted for the International Dublin Literary Award.
