= Song for Night =

2007 novella by Chris Abani

- Author: Chris Abani
- Publisher: Akashic Books
- Publication date: September 1, 2007
- ISBN: 978-1933354316

Song for Night is a 2007 novella by Nigerian-born American author Chris Abani.

== Reception and recognition ==
In a review by Africa in Words, Alexandra Schultheis Moore relays the novella's protagonist to Uzodinma Iweala's Beasts of No Nation, and wrote that the book "offers a compelling story as well as an extended, poignant meditation on representing African child soldiers and the atrocities they both commit and experience, particularly for an international audience". Micol J. Zhai, reviewing for The Wellesley News wrote, "Chris Abani’s novella [Song for Night] is a harrowingly beautiful recount of war from a decidedly unlucky child soldier named My Luck".

Song for Night was a 2008 recipient of the PEN Open Book Award.
