= Doul Govinda Temple =

Hindu temple in India

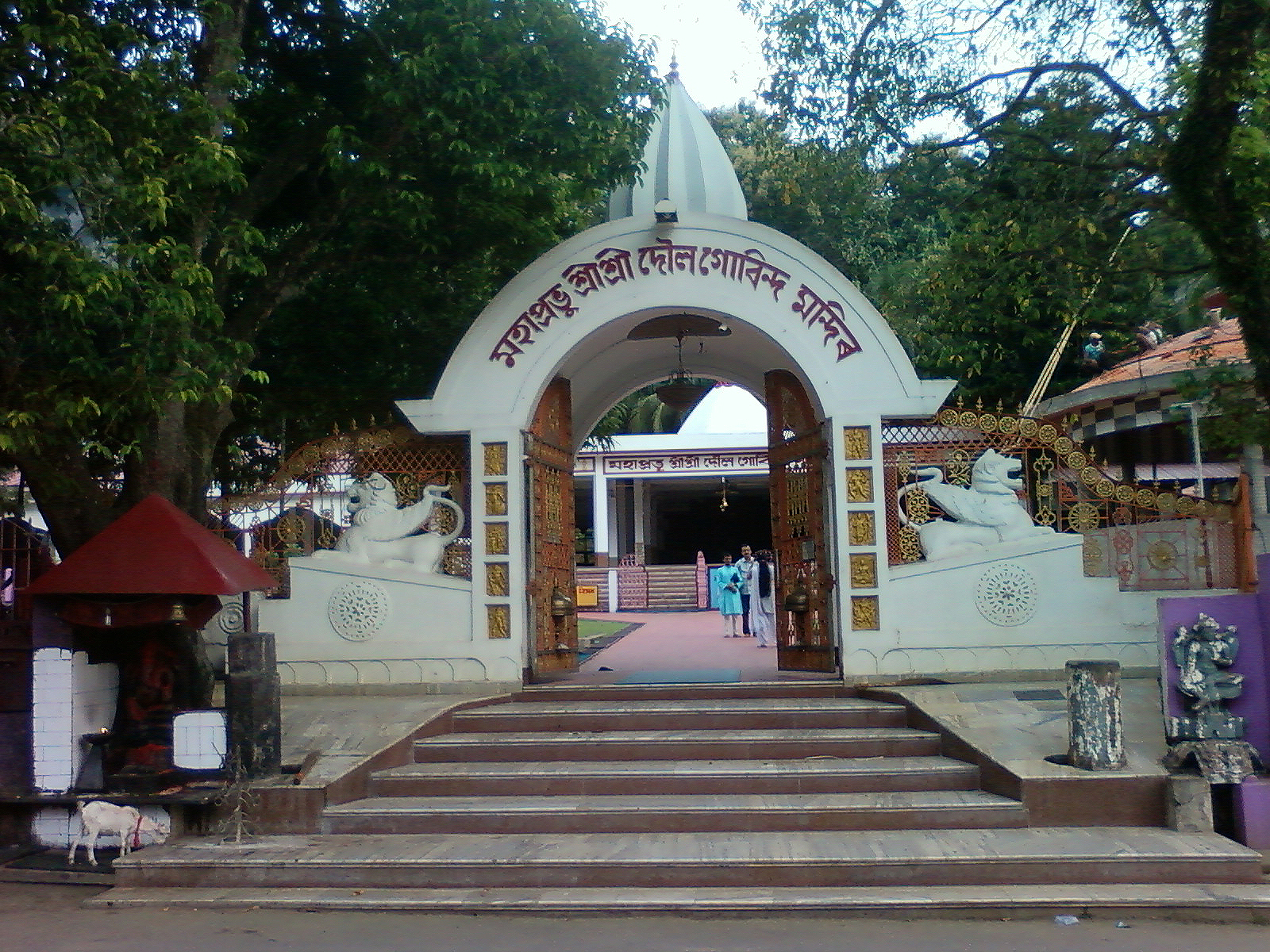

Religion
- Affiliation: Hinduism
- District: Kamrup
- Deity: Lord Krishna
- Festival: Holi

Location
- Location: North Guwahati
- State: Assam
- Country: India
- Interactive map of Doul Govinda Temple
- Coordinates: 26.206774°N 91.741706°E

Doul Govinda Temple (Pron: ˈdaʊl/ˈdu:l/ˈdəʊl gə(ʊ)ˈvɪndə) is one of the important temples of Kamrup, Assam, India. It is situated on the northern banks, on the foothills of Chandra Bharati hill at Rajaduar, North Guwahati. The temple is mainly devoted to Lord Krishna. Besides, there is an Namghar along with the temple within the same premises. The temple is open and accessible all the year round, but one can enjoy the thrill of a river cruise as well as walking on white sands of the beaches of Brahmaputra, from the month of November to April.

== History ==
Several stories exist regarding this deity and how 'He' was brought here by late Ganga Ram Barooah from a place called Sandhyasar near Nalbari. The first structure of Doul Govinda Temple was erected more than one hundred and fifty years ago but it was again renovated in 1966.

== Importance ==
The temple is known for its Holi celebrations in the month of February–March. Holi is observed by the local people for five days with various programmes and about five thousand pilgrims are always assembled at the temple premises during this time. Special Ferry service is available to the temple from Guwahati to Rajaduar at this time.

Daily activities of the Doul Govinda Temple start early, with the opening of the doors at seven in the morning. The priest bathes the idol and then performs the Archana. The worshipers start coming in from an hour after this, which continues till the end of the day. In between that, the temple remains closed during the afternoon. In the evening the Arati is performed by singing devotional songs or 'Kirtaan'. Prasada followed by Bhoga is distributed among the devotees in open hall, during afternoon hours daily. A good number of devotees contribute to the temple Management to offer Bhoga and Thagi (Sarai) on their behalf with or without craving. Such devotees get some amount of Bhoga for taking home from the counter.

== Transport ==
Generally Ferries as well as Steamers are available from Fancy Bazaar Ferry Ghat to Rajaduar, which is the easiest and fastest means, to reach the temple. After landing on Rajaduar, It is a five-minute walk to reach the Temple. Trekkers are available from Kharguli, as well as from Adabari and Jalukbari.
