= Alan Parkes (footballer) =

English footballer (1929–2013)

Personal information
- Full name: Alan Parkes
- Date of birth: 12 January 1929
- Place of birth: Hartlepool, County Durham, England
- Date of death: 14 April 2013 (aged 84)
- Place of death: Stockton-on-Tees, England
- Position: Centre forward

Youth career
- Sunderland

Senior career*
Years	Team	Apps	(Gls)
	Sunderland	0	(0)
194?–1949	Murton Colliery Welfare		
1949–195?	Charlton Athletic	0	(0)
1950–195?	Tonbridge		
1955	Darlington	1	(0)
- * Club domestic league appearances and goals

Alan Parkes (12 January 1929 – 14 April 2013) was an English footballer who played as a centre forward in the Football League for Darlington and in non-league football for Murton Colliery Welfare and Tonbridge. He was on the books of Sunderland and Charlton Athletic without representing them in League football.

== Life and career ==
Parkes was born in Hartlepool, County Durham, where he attended the Technical Day School. He began his football career with Sunderland, but never progressed past the junior teams, despite the view of the pseudonymous "Argus" in the Sunderland Echo that "from what I have seen of him I would prefer him to at least two of the players I have seen leading both the Reserves and the A team in the past 12 months".

He moved on to North Eastern League club Murton Colliery Welfare, from where he was transferred to First Division club Charlton Athletic in September 1949 for a £1,000 fee, "easily a record in the history of the Murton C.W. club". He scored 49 goals in his first season for Charlton's reserve and A teams, and was allowed to join Southern League club Tonbridge under a "gentleman's agreement" between the two clubs. He made an impressive debut in the FA Cup win against Gravesend & Northfleet: "though he did not score himself his astute handling of the Gravesend defence and his distribution of the ball had much to do with the Tonbridge superiority". A few days later – he was on National Service at the time – he was the only non-league player to be selected for the Army XI to play the Civil Service.

Parkes never appeared for Charlton in a league match, and returned to the north-east of England where he signed for Darlington. On 26 March 1955, at the age of 26, he made his Football League debut, in a 3–0 defeat away to Bradford City in the Third Division North. It was his only league appearance.

Parkes died in Stockton, County Durham, in 2013 at the age of 80.
