= Vikki Wakefield =

Australian novelist (born 1970)

- Born: 1970 (age 55–56)
- Occupation: Novelist
- Writing career
- Notable awards: 2020 Children's Book of the Year Award: Older Readers; 2025 Davitt Award, Best Adult Crime Novel

Vikki Wakefield (born 1970) is an Australian author of adult and young adult fiction.

== Early life ==
Vikki Wakefield was born in 1970.

== Career ==
After a career working in banking, journalism, and graphic design, Wakefield studied at TAFE and began writing.

Her first book, All I Ever Wanted, was published in 2011. It won the inaugural Adelaide Festival Award for Literature for Young Adult Fiction in 2012 and was shortlisted for the Victorian Premier's Prize for Writing for Young Adults in the same year. Two years later her second book, Friday Brown, won the same prize. It was also shortlisted for the 2013 Prime Minister’s Literary Award for young adult fiction.

In 2016 her third book, Inbetween Days, was an honour book in the Children's Book of the Year Award: Older Readers.

Wakefield's fourth book, Ballad for a Mad Girl, won the 2018 Davitt Award for best young adult novel and was shortlisted for other awards.

This Is How We Change the Ending, her fifth novel, won the 2020 Children's Book of the Year Award: Older Readers. It was shortlisted for the 2020 Victorian Premier's Prize for Writing for Young Adults, the 2020 Queensland Literary Awards' Young Adult Book Award, and the Young Adult Fiction Award in the 2022 Adelaide Festival Awards for Literature. This is How We Change the Ending was also longlisted for the 2020 Stella Prize.

To the River is a psychological thriller for adult readers, published in 2024. It won the 2025 Davitt Award for Best Adult Crime Novel.

== Works ==
- All I Ever Wanted, Text Publishing, 2011, ISBN 9781921758300
- Friday Brown, Text Publishing, 2012, ISBN 9781921921469
- Inbetween Days, Text Publishing, 2015, ISBN 9781922182364
- Ballad for a Mad Girl, Text Publishing, 2017, ISBN 9781925355291
- This is How We Change the Ending, Text Publishing, 2019, ISBN 9781922268136
- After You Were Gone, Text Publishing, 2022, ISBN 9781922458001
- To the River, Text Publishing, 2024, ISBN 9781915798312
