= Becoming Abigail =

2006 novel by Chris Abani

- Author: Chris Abani
- Language: English
- Genre: Fiction
- Publisher: Akashic Books
- Publication date: 3 January 2006
- Publication place: Nigeria
- Pages: 120
- ISBN: 978-1-936070-20-6
- Preceded by: The Secret History of Las Vegas

Becoming Abigail is a 2006 novella, published by Akashic Books. Written by Nigerian writer Chris Abani.

== Plot ==
Becoming Abigail shares the story of Abigail, a young Nigerian girl whose mother died at childbirth. Her father commits suicide after raising her up. She travels to London with Peter where she finds out that she is alone and that she does not exist.

== Reception and recognition ==
- A New York Times Editor's Choice.
- A Chicago Reader Critic's Choice.
- A selection of the Essence Magazine Book Club.
- A selection of the Black Expressions Book Club on National Public Radio.
- A New York Public Library Books For Teens Selection.
- Finalist, PEN/Beyond Margins Award.
