= Eugene Izzi =

American novelist

Eugene Izzi (March 23, 1953 – December 7, 1996) was an American crime writer.

Izzi, a lifelong resident of Chicago, set most of his work in that city. He wrote in the classic hard-boiled style made famous by Mickey Spillane and Dashiell Hammett. Despite moderate popularity, he is best known for the unusual circumstances surrounding his death.

== Background ==
Although few details are known of Izzi's early life, most accounts describe a trouble-prone youth. Izzi himself dropped out of high school and enlisted in the army. During his military service, Izzi completed his high school equivalency degree. Upon his return to Chicago, Izzi began an ordinary blue-collar life, working at the steel mills on Chicago's south side. Although married with children, Izzi began to drink heavily and acquired his own criminal record. In 1991, Izzi appeared at Barbara's Book Store in Oak Park, Illinois promoting his book "Prowlers". At this book signing, he talked about how he came to writing. After he and his wife had separated due to his depression and hard drinking, he began a swift decline, but he always carried with him his portable typewriter. He reached bottom when he was sleeping in the back room of a barber shop in exchange for cleaning up and helping around the shop. One night he reread what he had been writing over the past months and realized his stories were all self-pitying parodies of his own recent life: a misunderstood man wrongfully rebuffed by the woman he loved. He knew that if he wanted to be a writer, he had to break away from self-pity. He began writing stories about the people of steel mill neighborhoods on the Southeast side of Chicago where he grew up and toiled. He had found his path as a writer. He began to pull his life together and reconciled with his wife.

== Writing career ==
Izzi began his career as a form of personal therapy, writing during periodic layoffs from the steel mills. His hard work allowed him to repair his relationship with his wife, and quit drinking. After several years of steady rejection, St. Martin's Press published The Take in 1987. Bad Guys followed in 1988 and The Eighth Victim in the same year.

As his book sales increased and the positive reviews continued, Izzi landed a lucrative deal with Bantam Books to publish Tribal Secrets. Bantam provided a substantial advance, expecting the title to rank Izzi alongside contemporaries like Elmore Leonard, Tony Hillerman, Sara Paretsky, and Ed McBain.

Reviews of Tribal Secrets were poor, as were sales. Bantam quickly remaindered the title, angering Izzi, who believed the publisher failed to properly market and support his work. The dispute between author and publisher became contentious, eventually resulting in an unusual agreement. Izzi would be allowed to keep his advance, but was forbidden to publish under his own name for the next three years.

Izzi adopted the pseudonym Nick Gaitano and published three novels under that name.

His most successful title was The Criminalist, published posthumously in 1998.

== Suspicious death ==
On December 7, 1996, Izzi was found hanged, his body dangling outside the 14th-story window of his writing office in downtown Chicago. When his body was discovered, Izzi was wearing a bulletproof vest. In his pockets, investigators found brass knuckles, a can of "disabling spray" (likely mace or pepper spray), and a computer disc containing an unfinished manuscript.

Although officially ruled to be suicide and his family having accepted the coroner's verdict, the strange manner of Izzi's death and unusual items found with his body have led to numerous conspiracy theories. Among these were claims that Izzi had infiltrated a white supremacist group and was planning to detail their activities in a future book. In addition, the bizarre scene is said to resemble one portrayed in the unfinished manuscript.

== Bibliography ==
All United States publication dates are per Library Of Congress catalog.

=== Written as Eugene Izzi ===
- The Take (1987)
- Bad Guys (1988)
- The Eighth Victim (1988)
- The Booster (1989)
- King Of The Hustlers (1989)
- The Prime Roll (1990)
- Invasions (1990)
- Prowlers (1991)
- Tribal Secrets (1992)
- Tony's Justice (1993)
- Bulletin from the Streets (1995, UK only; no American edition)
- Players (1996, UK only; no American edition)
- A Matter Of Honor (1997)
- The Criminalist (1998)
- Safe Harbor (1999)

=== Written as Nick Gaitano ===
- Special Victims (1994)
- Mr. X (1995)
- Jaded (1996) (Spent Force in the UK edition)
