= Susan Rogers Cooper =

American writer

- Born: 1947 (age 78–79)
- Occupation: Novelist
- Writing career
- Genre: Cozy mystery

Susan Rogers Cooper (April 6, 1947 - April 3, 2024) was an American mystery novelist from Austin, Texas. Her works place her in the mystery cosy category.

== Selected works ==
The Milt Kovak Mysteries

- The Man In The Green Chevy (1988 St. Martins Press HC; 1991 Worldwide PB)
- Houston In The Rearview Mirror (1990 St. Martins Press HC; 1992 Worldwide PB)
- Other People's Houses (1990 St. Martins Press HC; 1993 Worldwide PB)
- Chasing Away The Devil (1991 St. Martins Press HC; 1993 Worldwide PB)
- Dead Moon On The Rise (1994 St. Martins Press HC)
- Doctors and Lawyers and Such (1995 St. Martins Press HC)
- Lying Wonders (2003 St. Martins Press HC; 2004 Worldwide PB)
- Vegas Nerve (2007 St. Martins Press HC)
- Shotgun Wedding (2008 Severn House HC; TPB)
- Rude Awakening (2009 Severn House HC; TPB)
- Husbands & Wives (2011 Severn House HC)
- Dark Waters (2013 Severn House HC)
- Countdown (2014 Severn House HC)
- Best Served Cold (2016 Severn House HC)

The E.J. Pugh Mysteries

- One, Two, What Did Daddy Do? (1992 St. Martins Press HC; 1996 Avon PB)
- Hickory Dickory Stalk (1996 Avon PB)
- Home Again, Home Again (1997 Avon PB)
- There Was A Little Girl (1998 Avon PB)
- A Crooked Little House (1999 Avon PB; 1999 Book Of The Month Club HC)
- Not In My Backyard (1999 Avon PB)
- Don't Drink The Water (2000 Avon PB)
- Romanced To Death (2008 Severn House HC; TPB)
- Full Circle (2010 Severn House HC; TPB)
- Dead Weight (2012 Severn House HC)
- Gone In A Flash (2013 Severn House HC)
- Dead To The World (2014 Severn House HC)
- Student Body (2017 Severn House HC)

The Kimmey Kruse Mysteries

- Funny As A Dead Comic (1993 St. Martins Press HC)
- Funny As A Dead relative (1994 St. Martins Press HC)

Kimmey also appears in two short stories

- "Barbecued Bimbo" from Malice Domestic 5 (1996 Pocket Books PB)
- "Ghost Busted" from Murder They Wrote II (1998 Berkeley PB)

A stand-alone short story titled "Family Tradition" appears in Vengeance is Hers (1997 Signet PB)
