= Sanctificum =

2010 poetry book by Chris Abani

Sanctificum is a 2010 poetry book by Chris Abani. It was a finalist for the 2024 Neustadt International Prize for Literature.
