= L. C. Tyler =

British writer of comic crime fiction (born 1951)

L. C. (Len) Tyler (born 1951) is a British writer of comic crime fiction. His Elsie and Ethelred mysteries feature Ethelred Tressider, a crime writer, and Elsie Thirkettle, his literary agent. He also writes a second series based on the lawyer John Grey and set in Restoration England.

== Biography ==
Born 1951, Tyler was raised in Southend-on-Sea, Essex and studied geography at Jesus College, Oxford University (matriculating in 1971), before going on to study systems analysis at City University in London. He worked for the British Council in Malaysia, Sudan, Thailand and Denmark, before becoming Chief Executive of the Royal College of Paediatrics and Child Health, then a full-time writer. Tyler's 2007 novel The Herring Seller's Apprentice was nominated for an Edgar Award for "Best Paperback Original". In 2015 LC Tyler was elected Chair of the Crime Writers' Association. He is a member of the Detection Club.

Tyler won the Goldsboro Last Laugh Award both in 2010, for The Herring in the Library, and in 2015, for Crooked Herring. The Herring Seller’s Apprentice and Ten Little Herrings were nominated for Edgar Allan Poe Awards. His short story The Trials of Margaret won the CWA Short Story Dagger in 2017.
