= James N. Frey =

American novelist

James N. Frey (born March 15, 1943, in Syracuse, New York) is an American writer and creative writing teacher. Frey has written both fiction and non-fiction and is known for his book called How to Write a Damn Good Novel. He has written novels, plays, and several guides on writing. In addition to being an author, he is a lecturer at schools and conferences. Frey was selected Honored Teacher of the Year in 1994 for his novel writing classes at the University of California, Berkeley. Currently, Frey lives in Berkeley, California.

== Bibliography ==
=== Fiction ===
- The Last Patriot (1984)
- The Armageddon Game (1985)
- The Elixir (1986)
- Long Way to Die (1987), Edgar Award Nominee
- U.S.S.A. (1987)
- Killing in Dreamland (1988)
- Circle of Death (1988)
- Came a Dead Cat (1991)
- Winter of the Wolves (1992), Literary Guild Selection

=== Non-fiction: books about writing ===
- How to Write a Damn Good Novel (1987)
- How to Write a Damn Good Novel, II (1994)
- The Key: How to Write Damn Good Fiction Using the Power of Myth (2000)
- How to Write a Damn Good Mystery (2004)
- How to Write a Damn Good Thriller (2010)
