= The Secret History of Las Vegas =

2014 crime novel by Chris Abani

- First edition
- Author: Chris Abani
- Genre: Mystery, Suspense, Thriller, Literary fiction
- Published: 2014
- Publisher: Penguin Books
- Publication place: Nigeria
- Pages: 336
- Awards: Edgar Award for Best Paperback Original (2015)
- ISBN: 978-0-143-12495-5
- Preceded by: GraceLand
- Followed by: Becoming Abigail
- Website: The Secret History of Las Vegas

The Secret History of Las Vegas is a 2014 crime novel written by Nigerian American writer Chris Abani. and published by Penguin Books on 7 January 2014 which later went on to win the Edgar Award for Best Paperback Original in 2015.
