= T. J. MacGregor =

American writer (born 1947)

- Born: June 7, 1947 (age 79); Caracas, Venezuela
- Occupation: Novelist
- Spouse: Rob MacGregor
- Writing career
- Pen name: Trish MacGregor, Trish Janeshutz, Alison Drake
- Period: 1985–present
- Genres: Thriller, suspense, paranormal
- Website: www.themysticalunderground.com

Patricia Janeshutz MacGregor (born June 7, 1947) writes most of her award-winning mysteries under the pen name of T.J. MacGregor. As Alison Drake, she wrote five novels and as Trish Janeshutz she wrote two. As Trish J MacGregor, she wrote the trilogy The Hungry Ghosts. As Trish MacGregor, she has written dozens nonfiction books that reflect her interests - synchronicity, precognition, astrology, the tarot, dreams, and yoga. In 2003, with the death of renowned astrologer Sydney Omarr, MacGregor took over the writing of his astrology books, several of which are co authored with husband, Rob MacGregor.

== Biography ==
Born and raised in Caracas, Venezuela, T. J. MacGregor is bilingual and feels a deep kinship with South America. She has a B.A. in Spanish, and a Master's in Library and Information Science. Before she sold her first novel in 1984, her jobs were all over the map. She taught English to Cuban refugees, Spanish to hormonal teenagers, was a social worker, and a librarian and Spanish teacher in a correctional facility for youthful offenders. Her best job was leading travel writing trips with her husband, writer and novelist Rob MacGregor, to the Peruvian Amazon. She lives in South Florida with her husband, their teenage daughter, and a menagerie of pets.

T.J. has written 42 novels, which include three different series – the Quin St. James/Mike McCleary and the Tango Key series, a trilogy, The Hungry Ghosts, as well as a number of stand-alone thrillers including Out of Sight, which won the Edgar Allan Poe Award for Best Paperback Original of 2002. Her most recent novel is U R Mine (2016).

Trish and husband, Rob, co author the synchrosecret blog that consists of over 3000 posts that explores their perspective on what synchronicity isn't and is:

- "Synchronicity isn’t the voice of a god or a devil or an inner twin. It is non-exclusive. It belongs to everyone. Anyone, from any walk of life, can experience it, learn from it, and enrich their lives."
- "Synchronicity is the coming together of inner and outer events in a way that is meaningful to the observer and which cannot be explained by cause and effect. Or: meaningful coincidence.

== Bibliography ==
=== As T.J. MacGregor ===
The Quin St. James/Mike McCleary series

- Dark Fields – 1986 – Ballantine Books – ISBN 978-0-345-33756-6
- Kill Flash – 1987 – Ballantine Books – ISBN 978-0-345-33754-2
- Death Sweet – 1988 – Ballantine Books – ISBN 978-0-345-33753-5
- On Ice – 1989 – Ballantine Books – ISBN 978-0-345-35045-9
- Kin Dread – 1990 – Ballantine Books – ISBN 978-0-345-35766-3
- Death Flats – 1991 – Ballantine Books – ISBN 978-0-345-35768-7
- Spree – 1992 – Ballantine Books – ISBN 978-0-345-37346-5
- Storm Surge – 1993 – Hyperion – ISBN 978-1-56282-789-2
- Blue Pearl – 1994 – Hyperion – ISBN 978-0-7868-6061-6
- Mistress of the Bones – 1995 – Hyperion – ISBN 978-0-7868-6106-4

The Tango Key Series

- Hanged Man – 1999 – P Mass Paper – ISBN 978-0-7860-0646-5
- Black Water – 2003 – Pinnacle – ISBN 978-0-7860-1557-3
- Total Silence – 2004 – Pinnacle – ISBN 978-0-7860-1558-0
- Category Five – 2005 – Pinnacle – ISBN 978-0-7860-1680-8
- Cold as Death – 2006 – Pinnacle – ISBN 978-0-7860-1681-5

Stand-Alone Thrillers

- The Seventh Sense – 2000 – Pinnacle – ISBN 978-0-7860-1083-7
- Vanished – 2001- Kensington Books – ISBN 978-0-7860-1162-9
- The Other Extreme – 2001 – Pinnacle – ISBN 978-0-7860-1322-7
- Out of Sight – 2002 – Pinnacle – ISBN 978-0-7860-1323-4
- Kill Time – 2007 – Pinnacle – ISBN 978-0-7860-1832-1
- Running Time - 2008 - Pinnacle - ISBN 978-0-7860-1833-8

=== As Trish Janeshutz ===
- In Shadow – 1985 – Random House – ISBN 978-0-345-32469-6
- Hidden Lake – 1987 – Random House – ISBN 978-0-345-33383-4
- The Making of Miami Vice, c-author Rob MacGregor – 1986 – Random House – ISBN 978-0-345-33669-9

=== As Alison Drake ===
- Tango Key – 1988 – Random House – ISBN 978-0-345-34774-9
- Fevered – 1988 – Random House – ISBN 978-0-345-34775-6
- Black Moon – 1989 – Random House – ISBN 978-0-345-35780-9
- High Strangeness – 1992 – Random House – ISBN 978-0-345-35779-3
- Lagoon (horror) – 1990 – Ballantine Books – ISBN 978-0-345-35778-6

=== As Trish MacGregor ===
- The Everything Astrology Book – 1998 – Adams Media – ISBN 978-1-58062-062-8
- Your Cosmic Kids: Using Astrology to Understand Your Children – 1999 – Hampton Roads Publishing – ISBN 978-1-57174-127-1
- Your Intuitive Moon: Using Lunar Signs & Cycles to Enhance Your Intuition – 2000 – NAL – ISBN 978-0-451-20201-7
- Creative Stars: Using Astrology to Tap Your Muse – 2002 – St. Martin's Griffin – ISBN 978-0-312-27505-1
- Your Story in the Stars – 2003 – St. Martin's Griffin – ISBN 978-0-312-29135-8
- Mars and Sex: The Secrets of Sexual Astrology – 2004 – Citadel Press – ISBN 978-0-8065-2529-7
- Soul Mate Astrology: How to Find and Keep Your Ideal Mate Through the Wisdom of the Stars – 2004 – Rockport Publishers – ISBN 978-1-59233-091-1
- The Everything Magic & Spells Book – 2000 – Adams Media – ISBN 978-1-58062-388-9
- The Everything Dreams Book, co-author Rob MacGregor – 1997 – Adams Media Corporation – ISBN 978-1-55850-806-4
- The Lotus & the Stars: The Way of Astro-Yoga, co-author Rob MacGregor – 2001 – McGraw Hill – ISBN 978-0-8092-9895-2
- Power Tarot, co-author Phyllis Vega – 1998 – Simon & Schuster – ISBN 978-0-684-84185-4
- Animal Totems, co-author Millie Gemondo – 2004 – Rockport Publishers – ISBN 978-1-59233-044-7
- Sydney Omarr's Spirit Guides – 2003 – Signet – ISBN 978-0-451-20965-8

=== As Trish J. MacGregor ===
==== The Hungry Ghosts ====
- Esperanza, Tor Books, 2011 ISBN 9780765326027
- Ghost Key, Tor Books, 2012 ISBN 9780765326034
- Apparition, Tor Books, 2013 ISBN 9780765326041

== Awards ==
Edgar Allan Poe Award for Best Paperback Original of 2002 for Out of Sight.
