= Carolyn Jess-Cooke =

Northern Irish poet (born 1978)

Carolyn Jess-Cooke (born 26 August 1978 in Belfast, Northern Ireland) is a poet and novelist from Belfast, Northern Ireland.

== Early life ==
Carolyn Jess-Cooke was born in Belfast, Northern Ireland in 1978. She was educated at The Queen's University of Belfast, where she received a BA (Hons), MA, and PhD by the age of 25. At 26 she took up a lectureship in film studies at the University of Sunderland, where she established herself as a film theorist, publishing numerous articles and books and receiving a reference in Who's Who in Research: Film. She took up a senior lectureship in Creative Writing at the University of Northumbria in 2009 but tendered her resignation to write full-time in January 2011, and is currently Reader in Creative Writing at the University of Glasgow. She has four children and lives outside Glasgow. Prominent themes in Jess-Cooke's work include trauma, motherhood, and feminism.

== Career ==
Jess-Cooke now publishes her fiction as CJ Cooke. She is the author of bestselling gothic novels, The Nesting (2020), which was published in 2021 in the UK and Commonwealth by HarperCollins, The Lighthouse Witches, which was nominated for ITW Thriller Awards and an Edgar Award from Mystery Writers of America, and optioned for a TV series by StudioCanal, and The Ghost Woods (2022), which was an Indigo Book of the Year 2022. Jess-Cooke regularly visits the place where she sets her books to carry out fieldwork and interviews.

Jess-Cooke's poetry has also appeared in Poetry Review, Poetry London, Poetry New Zealand, Poetry Ireland Review, The Wolf, Magma, Poetry Wales, The Lonely Poets' Guide to Belfast, Black Mountain Review, Ambit, Tower Poetry, The SHOp, and in a ribbon of steel that runs for half a mile throughout the Roseberry Park mental health hospital in Middlesbrough. Her debut poetry collection, Inroads, received an Eric Gregory Award, the Northern Promise Award, the Tyrone Guthrie Prize for Poetry, and was shortlisted for the New London Poetry Award in 2010.

In 2020, Jess-Cooke set up a virtual literary festival, The Stay-at-Home Literary Festival, which featured hundreds of writers, attracted audiences of over 15,000 and ran for two weeks throughout the pandemic.

Jess-Cooke is Reader in Creative Writing at the University of Glasgow where she leads research in the field of creative writing interventions for mental illness.

== Bibliography ==
Fiction

- 2011 The Guardian Angel's Journal (Little, Brown/Piatkus)
- 2012 The Boy Who Could See Demons (Little, Brown/Piatkus)
- 2017 I Know My Name (HarperCollins)
- 2019 The Blame Game (HarperCollins
- 2020 The Nesting (HarperCollins)
- 2021 The Lighthouse Witches (HarperCollins)
- 2022 The Ghost Woods (HarperCollins)
- 2023 A Haunting in the Arctic (HarperCollins)
- 2024 The Book of Witching (HarperCollins)
- 2025 The Last Witch (HarperCollins)

Poetry

- 2021 We Have To Leave The Earth (Siren)
- 2014 BOOM! (Seren)
- 2010 Inroads (Seren)

Non-Fiction

- 2007 Shakespeare on Film: Such Things As Dreams Are Made of (London: Wallflower)
- 2009 Apocalyptic Shakespeares (co-edited with M. Croteau) (McFarland)
- 2010 Film Sequels (Edinburgh University Press)
- 2010 Second Takes: Critical Approaches to the Film Sequel (co-edited with C. Verevis) (SUNY)
- 2014 Writing Motherhood (Siren)
