= Chatribari =

Locality in Assam, India

Coordinates: 26°14′N 91°7′E

Chatribari is a locality in north west of Guwahati. It is near Guwahati Railway Station.

== Health facilities ==
Chatribari hospital is located here.

== Education ==
There are various educational institutes located here such as Nichols English School and K.C Das Commerce college to name a few.

== See also ==
- Chandmari
- Bhangagarh
- Beltola
- Athgaon
- Assam Trunk Rd
