= Kharguli =

Coordinates: 26°19′N 91°7′E

Kharghuli is a locality in northern part of Guwahati, Assam, India. Situated on the south bank of the Brahmaputra river, it is a residential area, most of the parts of this locality has hilly terrain. The name Kharghuli is derived from the Assamese words ‘Khaarghar’ (armoury) and ‘ghuli’ (depression), referencing an armoury established by the Ahom kings in a natural depression along the riverbank.

== Transport ==
It is connected to rest of city with city buses and other modes of transportation. It is a pahar.

=== In the news ===
The area was affected by landslides in July 2026. In August 2021, a rave party was busted and drugs were recovered. Eightee were arrested.

== See also ==
- Jalukbari
- Pan Bazaar
