= Alan Parks (writer) =

Scottish crime writer (born 1963)

Alan Parks (born 1963) is a Scottish crime writer in the Tartan Noir genre. His fifth novel May God Forgive won the 2022 McIlvanney Prize as the best Scottish crime book of the year.

== Career ==
His novels, each including a month of the year in its title, are set in 1970s Glasgow and feature "rather bent copper" Harry McCoy. May God Forgive was shortlisted for the CWA Ian Fleming Steel Dagger.

In August 2025, Parks was a guest on the Off the Shelf Podcast as part of a feature on the McIlvanney Prize.

== Selected publications ==
- Bloody January (2017)
- February's Son (2019)
- Bobby March Will Live For Ever (2020)
- The April Dead (2021)
- May God Forgive (2022)
- To Die in June (2023)
