= Chris Abani =

Nigerian-born American author (born 1966)

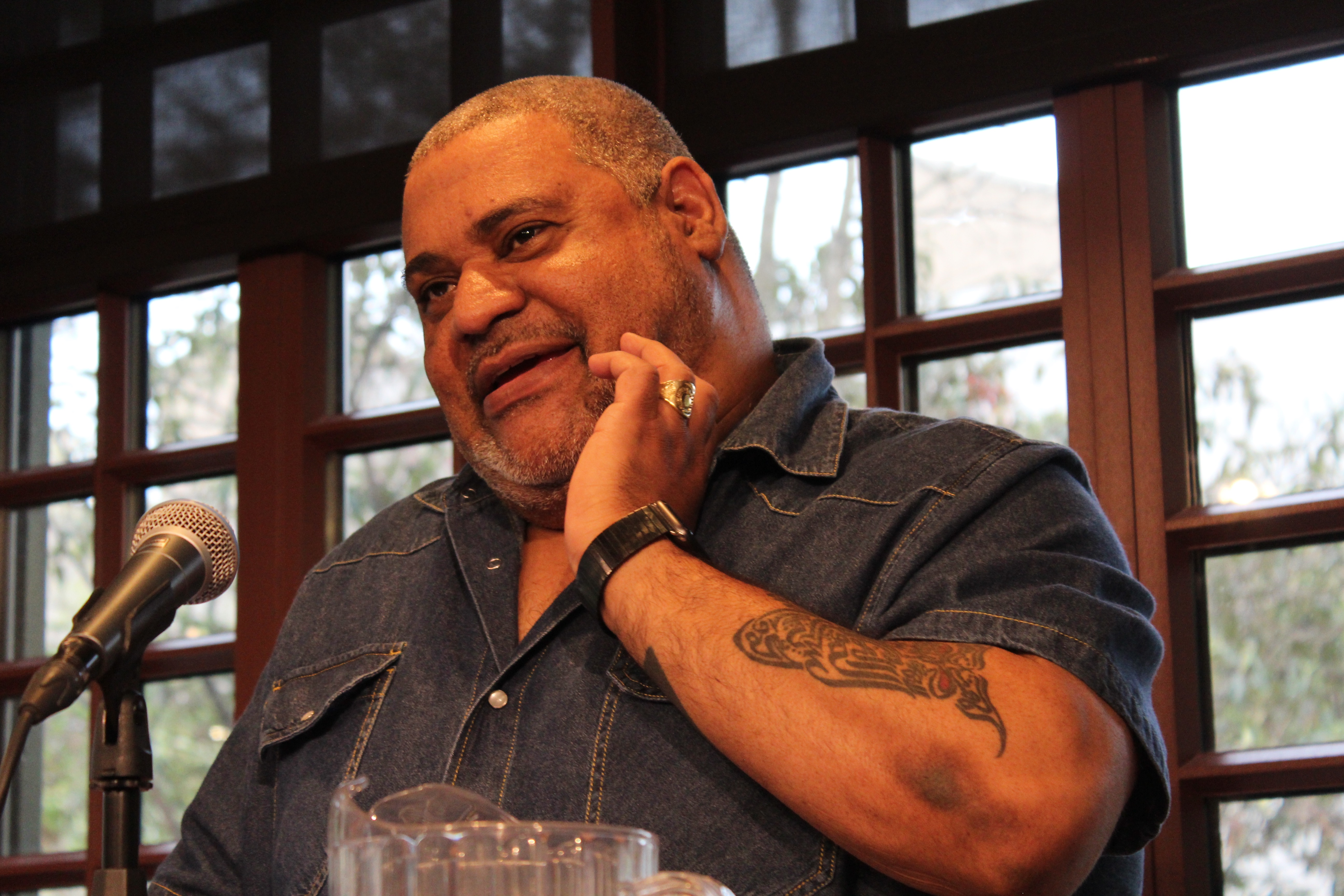
- Abani in 2019
- Born: Christopher Abani; 27 December 1966 (age 59); Afikpo, Ebonyi State, Nigeria
- Citizenship: Nigerian
- Education: Imo State University; Birkbeck College, University of London; University of Southern California
- Occupations: Author, poet, professor
- Notable work: GraceLand (2004); Becoming Abigail (2006); The Secret History of Las Vegas (2014)
- Website: www.chrisabani.com

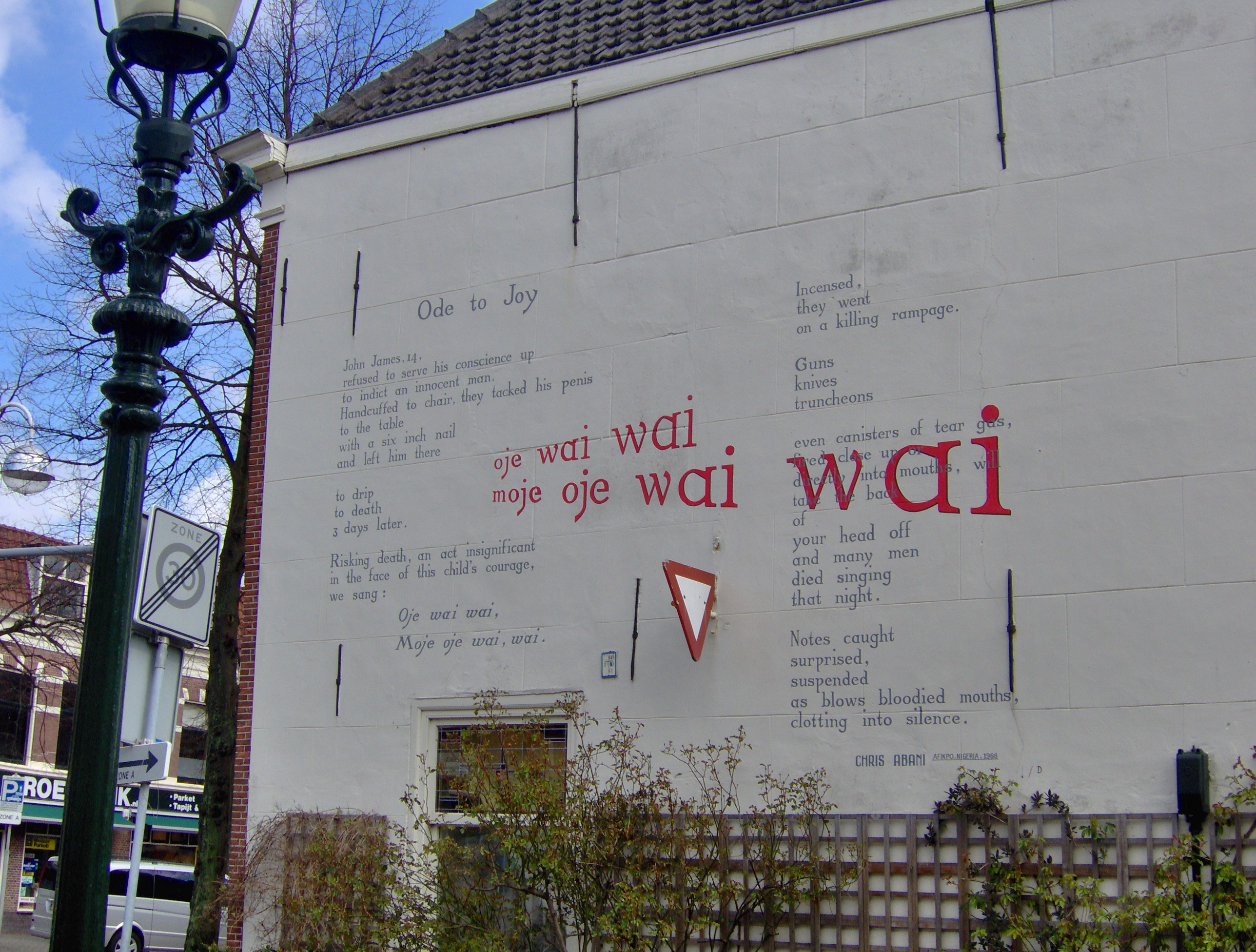
The poem "Ode to Joy" on a wall in the Dutch city of Leiden

Christopher Abani (born 27 December 1966) is a Nigerian American author. He says he is part of a new generation of Nigerian writers working to convey to an English-speaking audience the experience of those born and raised in "that troubled African nation".

== Biography ==
Abani was born in Afikpo, Ebonyi State, located in the southeastern region of Nigeria. His father was Igbo, while his mother was of English descent.

Abani published his first novel, Masters of the Board, in 1985 at the age of 16. It was a political thriller, the plot of which was an allegory based on a coup that was carried out in Nigeria just before it was written. He was imprisoned for six months on suspicion of an attempt to overthrow the government. He continued to write after his release from jail, but was imprisoned for one year after the publication of his 1987 novel Sirocco. During this time, he was held at the infamous Kiri Kiri prison, where he was tortured. After he was released from jail this time, he composed several anti-government plays that were performed on the street near government offices for two years. He was imprisoned a third time and was placed on death row. However, his friends had bribed government officials for his release in 1991, and immediately Abani, his mother, and his four siblings moved to the United Kingdom, living there until 1999. He then moved to the United States, where he now lives.

== Education and career ==
Abani holds a B.A. degree in English and Literary Studies from Imo State University, Nigeria; an M.A. in Gender and Culture from Birkbeck, University of London; an M.A. in English from the University of Southern California; and a Ph.D. in Creative Writing and Literature from the University of Southern California.

Abani has been awarded a PEN/Barbara Goldsmith Freedom to Write Award, the 2001 Prince Claus Awards, a Lannan Literary Fellowship, a California Book Award, a Hurston/Wright Legacy Award and the PEN/Hemingway Award. Selections of his poetry appear in the online journal Blackbird. From 2007 to 2012, he was Professor of Creative Writing at the University of California, Riverside.

He is currently the Director of the Program of African Studies at Northwestern University. He is also a Board of Trustees Professor of English there.

His book of poetry, Sanctificum (2010) which was published by Copper Canyon Press, is a sequence of linked poems, bringing together religious ritual, the Igbo language of his Nigerian homeland, and reggae rhythms in a postracial, liturgical love song.

Abani's foray into publishing has led to the formation of the Black Goat poetry series, which is an imprint of New York-based Akashic Books. Poets Kwame Dawes, Christina Garcia, Kate Durbin, Karen Harryman, Uche Nduka, Percival Everett, Khadijah Queen and Gabriela Jauregui have all been published by Black Goat.

Abani's crime novel The Secret History of Las Vegas won the Edgar Allan Poe Award for Best Paperback Original in 2015.

In the summer of 2016, a broad selection of his works was published in Israel by the small independent publishing house Ra'av under the title Shi'ur Geografia (Hebrew for "Geography Lesson"), edited by Noga Shevach and the poet Eran Tzelgov. The collection received great reviews and offered Hebrew readers a first encounter with the poetry of Abani.

== Writings ==
Novels

- Masters of the Board (Delta, 1985)
- GraceLand (FSG, 2004/Picador 2005)
- The Virgin of Flames (Penguin, 2007)
- The Secret History of Las Vegas (Penguin, 2014)

== Awards and honours ==
In 2001, Abani received a Middleton Fellowship from the University of Southern California. In 2003, he received the Lannan Foundation Literary Fellowship, as well as the Hellman/Hammet Grant from Human Rights Watch.

In 2006, Becoming Abigail was named an Editor's Choice book for The New York Times, and a Critic's Choice for Chicago Reader. It was also a book club selection for Essence Magazine and Black Expressions.

In 2007, The Virgin of Flames and Song for Night were Editor's Choice picks for The New York Times. The Virgin of Flames was also a Barnes & Noble Discovery Selection, and Becoming Abigail was a New York Libraries Books For Teens Selection.

In 2008, Abani received a Distinguished Humanist Award from the University of California, Riverside.

In 2009, Abani received a Guggenheim Fellowship in Fiction.

Awards for Abani's writing
Year	Title	Award	Result	Ref.
2001		PEN USA West Freedom-to-Write Award		
2001		Prince Claus Award for Literature & Culture		
2002		Imbongi Yesizwe Poetry International Award		
2005	"Blooding" in StoryQuarterly	Pushcart Prize	Nominee	
2005	GraceLand	PEN/Hemingway Award for Debut Novel	Winner	
2005	GraceLand	Hurston/Wright Legacy Award for Debut Novel	Winner	
2005	GraceLand	California Book Award for Fiction	Silver Medal	
2005	GraceLand	Los Angeles Times Book Prize for Fiction	Finalist	
2005	GraceLand	Commonwealth Writers Prize Best Books (Africa Region)	Finalist	
2006	"A Way To Turn This To Light"	Pushcart Prize for Poetry	Nominee	
2006	GraceLand	International Dublin Literary Award	Shortlist	
2007	Becoming Abigail	PEN/Beyond Margins Award	Finalist	
2007	Sanctificum	Pushcart Prize for Poetry	Nominee	
2008	Song For Night	PEN/Beyond Margins Award	Winner	
2008	The Virgin of Flames	Lamada Award	Nominee	
2009	Song For Night	St. Francis College Literary Prize	Shortlist	
2015	The Secret History of Las Vegas	Edgar Allan Poe Award for Best Paperback Original	Winner	

== See also ==
- List of people from Ebonyi State
- List of TED speakers
