= Sukreswar Temple =

Hindu temple in India

- Steps leading up to Sukreswar Temple

Religion
- Affiliation: Hinduism
- District: Kamrup
- Deity: Shiva

Location
- Location: Guwahati
- State: Assam
- Country: India
- Interactive map of Sukreswar Temple
- Coordinates: 26.1878049°N 91.7410059°E

Architecture
- Creator: Pramatta Singha
- Established: 1744; 282 years ago

The Sukreswar Temple (pronounced /ʃʊˈkreɪʃwər/ shuu-KRAY-shwər) is an important Shiva temple in the state of Assam in India. It has one of the largest Lingam of Lord Shiva. The temple is located on the Sukreswar or Itakhuli hill on the south bank of river Brahmaputra in the Panbazar locality of Guwahati city. Leading down from the temple compound is a long flight of steps to the river. Sitting on the steps of Sukreswar ghat one can enjoy the scenery of sun setting on the river, boats moving across the river, people performing puja in honour of their relatives who have left this world, children and older people bathing.

== History ==
It is believed to be constructed in 1744 by Ahom King Pramatta Singha (1744–1751). King Rajeswar Singha (1751–69) who also promoted cause of the Saiva cult made financial provisions for the Sukreswar Temple in 1759.

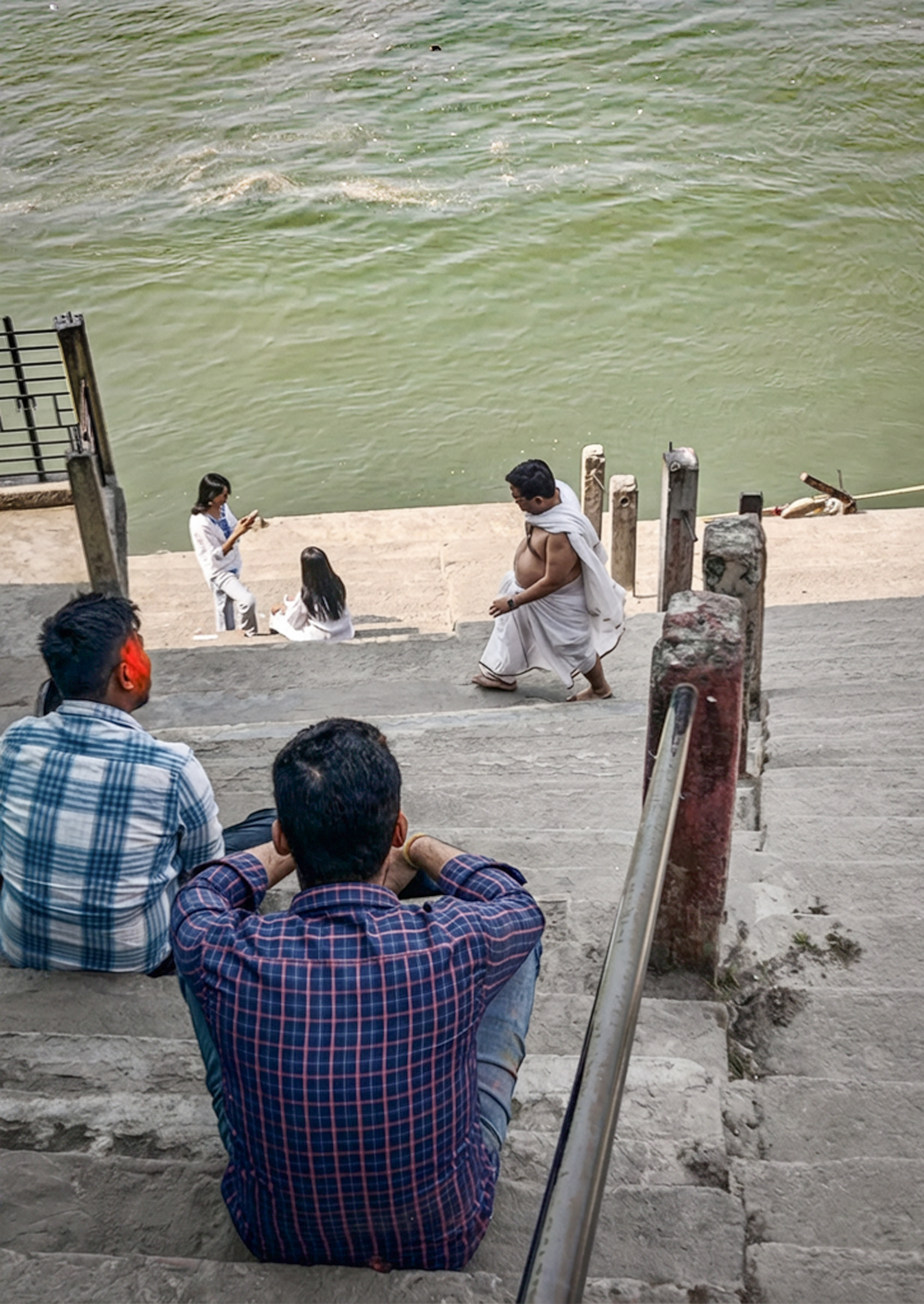
Sukreswar Temple Ghat, Guwahati, Assam
