= Anthony Award for Best Paperback Original =

Annual literary award

The Anthony Award for Best Paperback Original, established in 1986, is an annual award presented as part of the Anthony Awards on behalf of Mystery Writers of America.

== Recipients ==
Award winners and finalists
Year	Author	Title	Result	Ref.
1986	Nancy Pickard	Say No to Murder	Winner	
1986	Earl Emerson	Poverty Bay	Finalist	
1986	Kate Green	Shattered Moon	Finalist	
1986	P. M. Carlson	Murder is Academic	Finalist	
1986	Patrick A. Kelley	Sleightly Murder	Finalist	
1987	Robert Campbell	The Junkyard Dog	Winner	
1987	J. A. Jance	Trial by Fury	Finalist	
1987	Lilian Jackson Braun	The Cat Who Saw Red	Finalist	
1987	Rob Kantner	The Back-Door Man	Finalist	
1987	Warren Murphy	Too Old a Cat	Finalist	
1988	Robert Crais	The Monkey's Raincoat	Winner	
1988	Carolyn G. Hart	Death on Demand	Finalist	
1988	Conrad Haynes	Bishop’s Gambit, Declined	Finalist	
1988	Lia Matera	Where Lawyers Fear To Tread	Finalist	
1988	Lilian Jackson Braun	The Cat Who Played Brahms	Finalist	
1988	Sharyn McCrumb	Bimbos of the Death Sun	Finalist	
1989	Carolyn G. Hart	Something Wicked	Winner	
1989	D. R. Meredith	Murder by Impulse	Finalist	
1989	David Handler	The Man Who Died Laughing	Finalist	
1989	Lia Matera	A Radical Departure	Finalist	
1989	Marilyn Wallace	Primary Target	Finalist	
1989	Michael Avallone	High Noon at Midnight	Finalist	
1989	P. M. Carlson	Murder Unrenovated	Finalist	
1989	Sharyn McCrumb	Paying the Piper	Finalist	
1990	Carolyn G. Hart	Honeymoon with Murder	Winner	
1990	D. R. Meredith	Murder by Deception	Finalist	
1990	Deborah Valentine	A Collector of Photographs	Finalist	
1990	Keith Peterson	Rough Justice	Finalist	
1990	Malacai Black	On My Honor	Finalist	
1991	James McCahery	Grave Undertaking	Winner	
1991	Rochelle Krich	Where’s Mommy Now?	Winner	
1991	B. J. Oliphant	Dead in the Scrub	Finalist	
1991	Jane Haddam	Not a Creature Was Stirring	Finalist	
1991	Marilyn Wallace (editor)	Sisters in Crime 2	Finalist	
1996	Harlan Coben	Deal Breaker	Winner	
1996	Eileen Dreyer	Bad Medicine	Finalist	
1996	Gloria White	Charged with Guilt	Finalist	
1996	R. D. Zimmerman	Closet	Finalist	
1996	Teri Holbrook	A Far and Deadly Cry	Finalist	
1997	Terris McMahan Grimes	Somebody Else’s Child	Winner	
1997	Harlan Coben	Fade Away	Finalist	
1997	Steven Womack	Chain of Fools	Finalist	
1997	Susan Wade	Walking Rain	Finalist	
1997	Teri Holbrook	The Grass Widow	Finalist	
1998	Rick Riordan	Big Red Tequila	Winner	
1998	K. J. A. Wishnia	23 Shades of Black	Finalist	
1998	Laura Lippman	Charm City	Finalist	
1998	Martin J. Smith	Time Release	Finalist	
1998	Sujata Massey	The Salaryman’s Wife	Finalist	
1999	Laura Lippman	Butchers Hill	Winner	
1999	Caroline Roe	Remedy for Treason	Finalist	
1999	Rick Riordan	The Widower’s Two Step	Finalist	
1999	Steven Womack	Murder Manual	Finalist	
1999	Sujata Massey	Zen Attitude	Finalist	
2000	Laura Lippman	In Big Trouble	Winner	
2000	Anthony P. Dunbar	Lucky Man	Finalist	
2000	Caroline Roe	Antidote for Avarice	Finalist	
2000	José Latour	Outcast	Finalist	
2000	Robin Burcell	Every Move She Makes	Finalist	
2001	Kate Grilley	Death Dances to a Reggae Beat	Winner	
2001	Chassie West	Killing Kin	Finalist	
2001	Daniel Stashower	The Floating Lady Murder	Finalist	
2001	Eric Wright	The Kidnapping of Rosie Dawn	Finalist	
2001	Katy Munger	Bad to the Bone	Finalist	
2001	Laura Wilson	A Little Death	Finalist	
2002	Charlaine Harris	Dead Until Dark	Winner	
2002	Daniel Stashower	The Houdini Specter	Finalist	
2002	Jeff Abbott	A Kiss Gone Bad	Finalist	
2002	Jerrilyn Farmer	Dim Sum Dead	Finalist	
2002	P. J. Parrish	Dead of Winter	Finalist	
2003	Robin Burcell	Fatal Truth	Winner	
2003	Andy Straka	A Killing Sky	Finalist	
2003	Jeff Abbott	Black Jack Point	Finalist	
2003	P. J. Parrish	Paint It Black	Finalist	
2003	Roberta Isleib	Six Strokes Under	Finalist	
2004	Robin Burcell	Deadly Legacy	Winner	
2004	Elaine Flinn	Dealing in Murder	Finalist	
2004	Jason Starr	Tough Luck	Finalist	
2004	P. J. Parrish	Thicker Than Water	Finalist	
2004	Sylvia Maultash Warsh	Find Me Again	Finalist	
2005	Jason Starr	Twisted City	Winner	
2005	M. J. Rose	The Halo Effect	Finalist	
2005	Roberta Isleib	Putt to Death	Finalist	
2005	Robin Burcell	Cold Case	Finalist	
2005	Susan McBride	Blue Blood	Finalist	
2006	Reed Farrel Coleman	The James Deans	Winner	
2006	Allan Guthrie	Kiss Her Goodbye	Finalist	
2006	Charlie Huston	Six Bad Things	Finalist	
2006	P. J. Parrish	A Killing Rain	Finalist	
2006	Susan McBride	The Good Girl’s Guide to Murder	Finalist	
2007	Dana Cameron	Ashes and Bones	Winner	
2007	Charlie Huston	A Dangerous Man	Finalist	
2007	Naomi Hirahara	Snakeskin Shamisen	Finalist	
2007	Robert Fate	Baby Shark	Finalist	
2007	Sean Doolittle	The Cleanup	Finalist	
2007	Troy Cook	47 Rules of Highly Effective Bank Robbers	Finalist	
2007	Victor Gischler	Shotgun Opera	Finalist	
2008	P. J. Parrish	A Thousand Bones	Winner	
2008	David Corbett	Blood of Paradise	Finalist	
2008	Ken Bruen and Jason Starr	Slide	Finalist	
2008	Megan Abbott	Queenpin	Finalist	
2008	Robert Fate	Baby Shark’s Beaumont Blues	Finalist	
2009	Julie Hyzy	State of the Onion	Winner	
2009	Christa Faust	Money Shot	Finalist	
2009	Max Allan Collins	The First Quarry	Finalist	
2009	P. J. Parrish	South of Hell	Finalist	
2009	Vicki Lane	In a Dark Season	Finalist	
2010	Bryan Gruley	Starvation Lake	Winner	
2010	G. M. Malliet	Death and the Lit Chick	Finalist	
2010	Hank Phillippi Ryan	Air Time	Finalist	
2010	Ken Bruen and Reed Farrel Coleman	Tower	Finalist	
2010	Max Allan Collins	Quarry in the Middle	Finalist	
2010	Megan Abbott	Bury Me Deep	Finalist	
2011	Duane Swierczynski	Expiration Date	Winner	
2011	Hank Phillippi Ryan	Drive Time	Finalist	
2011	Bryan Gruley	The Hanging Tree	Finalist	
2011	Frank Tallis	Vienna Secrets	Finalist	
2011	Robert Goddard	Long Time Coming	Finalist	
2012	Julie Hyzy	Buffalo West Wing	Winner	
2012	Christa Faust	Choke Hold	Finalist	
2012	Duane Swierczynski	Fun & Games	Finalist	
2012	Frank Tallis	Vienna Twilight	Finalist	
2012	Michael Stanley	The Death of the Mantis	Finalist	
2012	Robert Jackson Bennett	The Company Man	Finalist	
2013	Johnny Shaw	Big Maria	Winner	
2013	Alison Gaylin	And She Was	Finalist	
2013	Joelle Charbonneau	Murder for Choir	Finalist	
2013	Lou Berney	Whiplash River	Finalist	
2013	Malla Nunn	Blessed Are the Dead	Finalist	
2014	Catriona McPherson	As She Left It	Winner	
2014	Alex Marwood	The Wicked Girls	Finalist	
2014	Chris F. Holm	The Big Reap	Finalist	
2014	Darrell James	Purgatory Key	Finalist	
2014	Stephen King	Joyland	Finalist	
2015	Catriona McPherson	The Day She Died	Winner	
2015	Alex Marwood	The Killer Next Door	Finalist	
2015	Alison Gaylin	Stay With Me	Finalist	
2015	Ben H. Winters	World of Trouble	Finalist	
2015	James W. Ziskin	No Stone Unturned	Finalist	
2016	Lou Berney	The Long and Faraway Gone	Winner	
2016	Adrian McKinty	Gun Street Girl	Finalist	
2016	James W. Ziskin	Stone Cold Dead	Finalist	
2016	Josh Stallings	Young Americans	Finalist	
2016	Lori Rader-Day	Little Pretty Things	Finalist	
2017	James W. Ziskin	Heart of Stone	Winner	
2017	Adrian McKinty	Rain Dogs	Finalist	
2017	Eric Beetner	Leadfoot	Finalist	
2017	Jay Stringer	How To Kill Friends and Implicate People	Finalist	
2017	Jess Lourey	Salem’s Cipher	Finalist	
2017	Patricia Abbott	Shot in Detroit	Finalist	
2018	Lori Rader-Day	The Day I Died	Winner	
2018	Eryk Pruitt	What We Reckon	Finalist	
2018	James W. Ziskin	Cast the First Stone	Finalist	
2018	Nadine Nettmann	Uncorking a Lie	Finalist	
2018	Thomas Pluck	Bad Boy Boogie	Finalist	
2019	Lori Rader-Day	Under a Dark Sky	Winner	
2019	Alison Gaylin	If I Die Tonight	Finalist	
2019	James W. Ziskin	A Stone’s Throw	Finalist	
2019	Kellye Garrett	Hollywood Ending	Finalist	
2019	Naomi Hirahara	Hiroshima Boy	Finalist	
2020	Gigi Pandian	The Alchemist’s Illusion	Winner	
2020	Catriona McPherson	Scot & Soda	Finalist	
2020	E. A. Aymar	The Unrepentant	Finalist	
2020	Gabriel Valjan	The Company Files: 2. The Naming Game	Finalist	
2020	L. A. Chandlar	The Pearl Dagger	Finalist	
2020	Susanna Calkins	Murder Knocks Twice	Finalist	
2020	Wendall Thomas	Drowned Under	Finalist	
2021	Jess Lourey	Unspeakable Things	Winner	
2021	Alyssa Cole	When No One Is Watching	Finalist	
2021	Gabriel Valjan	Dirty Old Town	Finalist	
2021	Lori Rader-Day	The Lucky One	Finalist	
2021	Susanna Calkins	The Fate of a Flapper	Finalist	
2022	Jess Lourey	Bloodline	Winner	
2022	Cheryl A. Head	Warn Me When It’s Time	Finalist	
2022	Greg Herren	Bury Me In Shadows	Finalist	
2022	Tara Laskowski	The Mother Next Door	Finalist	
2022	Tori Eldridge	The Ninja Betrayed	Finalist	
2023	Jess Lourey	The Quarry Girls	Winner	
2023	Gabriel Valjan	Hush Hush	Finalist	
2023	James L’Etoile	Dead Drop	Finalist	
2023	Kelly J. Ford	Real Bad Things	Finalist	
2023	Sandra SG Wong	In the Dark We Forget	Finalist	
