= Bouchercon XLIII =

2012 mystery and detective fiction convention

- "Crime fiction rocks!"
- Date: October 14, 2012
- Location: Cleveland, Ohio
- Country: USA
- Hosted by: Marjory Mogg
- Website: http://www.bcon2012.com

Bouchercon is an annual convention of creators and devotees of mystery and detective fiction. It is named in honour of writer, reviewer, and editor Anthony Boucher; also the inspiration for the Anthony Awards, which have been issued at the convention since 1986. This page details Bouchercon XLIII and the 27th Anthony Awards ceremony.

== Bouchercon ==
The convention was held in the Renaissance Cleveland Hotel of Cleveland, Ohio, on October 4, 2012; running until the 7th. The event was chaired by readers advisory librarian Marjory Mogg.

== Anthony Awards ==
The following list details the awards distributed at the twenty-fifth annual Anthony Awards ceremony.

=== Novel award ===
Winner:

- Louise Penny, A Trick of the Light

Shortlist:

- Megan Abbott, The End of Everything
- Reed Farrel Coleman, Hurt Machine
- Michael Connelly, The Drop
- Julia Spencer-Fleming, One Was a Soldier

=== First novel award ===
Winner:

- Sara J. Henry, Learning to Swim

Shortlist:

- Darrell James, Nazareth Child
- Rochelle Staab, Who Do, Voodoo?
- Taylor Stevens, The Informationist
- Steve Ulfelder, Purgatory Chasm
- S.J. Watson, Before I Go to Sleep

=== Paperback original award ===
Winner:

- Julie Hyzy, Buffalo West Wing

Shortlist:

- Robert Jackson Bennett, The Company Man
- Christa Faust, Choke Hold
- Michael Stanley, Death of the Mantis
- Duane Swierczynski, Fun & Games
- Frank Tallis, Vienna Twilight

=== Short story award ===
Winner:

- Dana Cameron, "Disarming" from Ellery Queen's Mystery Magazine, June 2011

Shortlist:

- Ace Atkins, "The Case of Death and Honey", from A Study In Sherlock
- Daryl Wood Gerber, "Palace on the Lake", from Fish Tales: The Guppy Anthology
- Barb Goffman, "Truth and Consequences", from Mystery Times Ten
- Roberta Isleib, "The Itinerary", from MWA Presents The Rich and The Dead
- Twist Phelan, "Happine$$", from MWA Presents The Rich and The Dead

=== Critical / Non-fiction award ===
Winner:

- Charlaine Harris, The Sookie Stackhouse Companion

Shortlist:

- Leslie Budewitz, Books, Crooks and Counselors: How to Write Accurately About Criminal Law and Courtroom Procedure
- John Curran, Agatha Christie: Murder in the Making: More Stories and Secrets from Her Notebooks
- Michael Dirda, On Conan Doyle; or, The Whole Art of Storytelling
- Philippa Gates, Detecting Women: Gender and the Hollywood Detective Film
