= Anthony Award for Best Short Story =

Annual literary award

The Anthony Award for Best Short Story, established in 1986, is an annual award presented as part of the Anthony Awards on behalf of Mystery Writers of America.

== Recipients ==
Award winners and finalists
Year	Author	Title	Publication	Result	Ref.
1986	Linda Barnes	“Lucky Penny”	New Black Mask #3	Winner	
1986	John Lutz	“Ride the Lightning”	Alfred Hitchcock Mystery Magazine	Finalist	
1986	Loren D. Estleman	“Eight Mile and Dequindre”	Alfred Hitchcock Mystery Magazine	Finalist	
1986	Peter Lovesey	“Vandals”	Ellery Queen's Mystery Magazine	Finalist	
1986	Ruth Rendell	“The Convolvulus Clock”	Ellery Queen's Mystery Magazine	Finalist	
1987	Sue Grafton	“The Parker Shotgun”	Mean Streets	Winner	
1987	Clark Howard	“Scalplock”	Ellery Queen's Mystery Magazine	Finalist	
1987	Wayne D. Dundee	“Body Count”	Mean Streets	Finalist	
1988	Robert Barnard	“Breakfast Television”	Ellery Queen's Mystery Magazine	Winner	
1988	Ed Gorman	“Turn Away”	Black Lizard Anthology of Crime Fiction	Finalist	
1988	Harlan Ellison	“Soft Monkey”	Mystery Scene Reader #1	Finalist	
1988	Joyce Harrington	“The Au Pair Girl”	Matter of Crime #1	Finalist	
1988	Max Allan Collins	“Scrap”	Black Lizard Anthology of Crime Fiction	Finalist	
1990	Nancy Pickard	“Afraid All the Time”	Sisters in Crime	Winner	
1990	Sharyn McCrumb	“A Wee Doch and Doris”	Mistletoe Mysteries	Finalist	
1990	Shelley Singer	“A Terrible Thing”	Sisters in Crime	Finalist	
1990	Susan Dunlap	“No Safety”	Sisters in Crime	Finalist	
1991	Susan Dunlap	“The Celestial Buffet”	Sisters in Crime 2	Winner	
1991	Marilyn Wallace	“A Tale of Two Pretties”	Sisters in Crime 3	Finalist	
1991	Sarah Shankman	“Say You're Sorry”	Sisters in Crime 3	Finalist	
1991	Sharyn McCrumb	“Remains to Be Seen”	Mummy Stories	Finalist	
1991	Sharyn McCrumb	“The Luncheon”	Sisters in Crime 2	Finalist	
1992	Liza Cody	“Lucky Dip”	A Woman’s Eye	Winner	
1992	Linda Grant	“Last Rites”	Sisters in Crime 4	Finalist	
1992	Margaret Maron	“Deborah's Judgment”	A Woman’s Eye	Finalist	
1992	Maxine O'Callahan	“Wolf Winter”	Sisters in Crime 4	Finalist	
1992	Peter Lovesey	“The Crime of Miss Oyster Brown”	Ellery Queen's Mystery Magazine	Finalist	
1992	Wendy Hornsby	“Nine Sons”	Sisters in Crime 4	Finalist	
1993	Diane Mott Davidson	“Cold Turkey”	Sisters in Crime 5	Winner	
1993	Doug Allyn	“Candles in the Rain”	Ellery Queen's Mystery Magazine	Finalist	
1993	Edward D. Hoch	“The Summer of our Discontent”	Ellery Queen's Mystery Magazine	Finalist	
1993	Gabrielle Kraft	“One Hit Wonder”	Sisters in Crime 5	Finalist	
1993	Rochelle Krich	“A Golden Opportunity”	Sisters in Crime 5	Finalist	
1994	Susan Dunlap	“Checkout”	Malice Domestic 2	Winner	
1994	K. K. Beck	“A Romance in the Rockies”	Malice Domestic 2	Finalist	
1994	M. D. Lake	“Kim's Game”	Malice Domestic 2	Finalist	
1994	Robert Lopresti	“Crow's Feat”	Constable New Crimes 2	Finalist	
1995	Sharyn McCrumb	“The Monster of Glarnis”	Royal Crimes	Winner	
1995	Ed Gorman	“One of Those Days, One of Those Nights”	Crime Yellow	Finalist	
1995	Ian Rankin	“A Deep Hole”	London Noir	Finalist	
1995	Robert Barnard	“The Gentleman in the Lake”	Ellery Queen's Mystery Magazine	Finalist	
1996	Gar Anthony Haywood	“And Pray Nobody Sees You”	Spooks, Spies & Private Eyes	Winner	
1996	Bill Crider	“How I Found a Cat, Lost True Love, and Broke the Bank at Monte Carlo”	Cat Crimes Takes a Vacation	Finalist	
1996	Elizabeth Daniels Squire	“The Dog Who Remembered too Much”	Malice Domestic 4	Finalist	
1996	Jean B. Cooper	“The Judge’s Boy”	Ellery Queen's Mystery Magazine	Finalist	
1996	K. K. Beck	“Rule of Law”	Malice Domestic 4	Finalist	
1997	Carolyn Wheat	“Accidents Will Happen”	Malice Domestic 5	Winner	
1997	Brendan DuBois	“The Dark Snow”	Playboy	Finalist	
1997	Eve K. Sandstrom	“Bugged”	Malice Domestic 5	Finalist	
1997	Janet LaPierre	“Luminarias Make it Christmas-y”	Ellery Queen's Mystery Magazine	Finalist	
1998	Edward D. Hoch	“One Bag of Coconuts”	Ellery Queen's Mystery Magazine	Winner	
1998	Jan Grape	“A Front-Row Seat”	Vengeance Is Hers	Winner	
1998	James DeFilippi	“A Fog of Many Colors”	New Mystery	Finalist	
1998	James Dorr	“Paperboxing Art”	New Mystery	Finalist	
1998	Simon Brett	“Ways to Kill a Cat”	Malice Domestic 6	Finalist	
1999	Barbara D'Amato Chittenden	“Of Course You Know that Chocolate Is a Vegetable?”	Ellery Queen's Mystery Magazine	Winner	
1999	Harlan Coben	“A Simple Philosophy”	Malice Domestic 7	Finalist	
1999	Jan Burke	“Two Bits”	Ellery Queen's Mystery Magazine	Finalist	
1999	Peter Robinson	“The Two Ladies of Rose Cottage”	Malice Domestic 7	Finalist	
1999	Rick Riordan	“A Small Silver Gun”	MSCMM	Finalist	
2000	Margaret Chittenden	“Noir Lite”	Ellery Queen's Mystery Magazine	Winner	
2000	Barry Baldwin	“A Bit of a Treat”	Alfred Hitchcock Mystery Magazine	Finalist	
2000	Bill and Judy Crider	“At The Hop”	Till Death Do Us Part	Finalist	
2000	Jeffery Deaver	“Triangle”	Ellery Queen's Mystery Magazine	Finalist	
2000	Laurie R. King	“Paleta Man”	Irreconcilable Differences	Finalist	
2001	Edward D. Hoch	“The Problem of the Potting Shed”	Ellery Queen's Mystery Magazine	Winner	
2001	Donald Olson	“Don't Go Upstaris”	Ellery Queen's Mystery Magazine	Finalist	
2001	Peter Robinson	“Missing in Action”	Ellery Queen's Mystery Magazine	Finalist	
2001	Rhys Bowen	“The Seal of the Confessional”	Unholy Orders	Finalist	
2001	Rochelle Krich	“Widow's Peak”	Unholy Orders	Finalist	
2002	Bill and Judy Crider	“Chocolate Moose”	Death Dines at 8:30	Winner	
2002	Margaret Maron	“Virgo in Sapphires”	Ellery Queen's Mystery Magazine	Finalist	
2002	Rochelle Krich	“Bitter Waters”	Criminal Kabbalah	Finalist	
2002	S. J. Rozan	“Double-Crossing Delancy”	Mystery Street	Finalist	
2002	Ted Hertel, Jr.	“My Bonnie Lies...”	Mammoth Book of Legal Thrillers	Finalist	
2003	Marcia Talley	“Too Many Cooks”	Much Ado About Murder	Winner	
2003	Bob Truluck	“A Man Called Ready”	Measures of Poison	Finalist	
2003	Clark Howard	“To Live and Die in Midland, Texas”	Ellery Queen's Mystery Magazine	Finalist	
2003	Lauren Haney	“Murder In The Land Of Wawat”	The Mammoth Book Of Egyptian Whodunnits	Finalist	
2003	Toni Kelner	“Bible Belt”	Ellery Queen's Mystery Magazine	Finalist	
2004	Rhys Bowen	“Doppelganger”	Blood On Their Hands	Winner	
2004	Eddie Muller	“Wanda Wilcox Is Trapped”	Plots With Guns	Finalist	
2004	Elaine Viets	“Red Meat”	Blood On Their Hands	Finalist	
2004	Jack Bludis	“Munchies”	Hardbroiled	Finalist	
2004	Sandy Balzo	“The Grass Is Always Greener”	Ellery Queen's Mystery Magazine	Finalist	
2005	Elaine Viets	“Wedding Knife”	Chesapeake Crimes	Winner	
2005	Arthur Nersesian	“Hunter Trapper”	Brooklyn Noir	Finalist	
2005	Rhys Bowen	“Voodoo”	Alfred Hitchcock Mystery Magazine	Finalist	
2005	Ted Hertel, Jr.	“It's Crackers to Slip a Rozzer the Dropsey in Snide”	Small Crimes	Finalist	
2005	Terence Faherty	“The Widow of Slane”	Ellery Queen's Mystery Magazine	Finalist	
2006	Barbara Seranella	“Misdirection”	Greatest Hits	Winner	
2006	Elaine Viets	“Killer Blonde”	Drop-Dead Blonde	Finalist	
2006	Libby Fischer Hellmann	“House Rules”	Murder in Vegas	Finalist	
2006	Marcia Talley	“Driven To Distraction”	Chesapeake Crimes I	Finalist	
2006	Nancy Pickard	“There Is No Crime On Easter Island”	Ellery Queen's Mystery Magazine	Finalist	
2007	Simon Wood	“My Father's Secret”	Crimespree Magazine	Winner	
2007	Bill Crider	“Cranked”	Damn Near Dead	Finalist	
2007	Dana Cameron	“The Lords of Misrule”	Sugarplums and Scandal	Finalist	
2007	Elaine Viets	“After the Fall”	Alfred Hitchcock Mystery Magazine	Finalist	
2007	Megan Abbott	“Policy”	Damn Near Dead	Finalist	
2007	Toni Kelner	“Sleeping with the Plush”	Alfred Hitchcock Mystery Magazine	Finalist	
2008	Laura Lippman	“Hardly Knew Her”	Dead Man's Hand	Winner	
2008	Daniel Woodrell	“Uncle”	A Hell of a Woman	Finalist	
2008	Rhys Bowen	“Please Watch Your Step”	The Strand Magazine	Finalist	
2008	Steve Hockensmith	“Dear Dr. Watson”	Ellery Queen's Mystery Magazine	Finalist	
2008	Toni L. P. Kelner	“How Stella Got her Grave Back”	Many Bloody Returns	Finalist	
2009	Sean Chercover	“A Sleep Not Unlike Death”	Hardcore Hardboiled	Winner	
2009	Dana Cameron	“The Night Things Changed”	Wolfsbane & Mistletoe	Finalist	
2009	Jane K. Cleland	“Killing Time”	Alfred Hitchcock Mystery Magazine	Finalist	
2009	Kristine Kathryn Rusch	“The Secret Lives of Cats”	Ellery Queen's Mystery Magazine	Finalist	
2009	Laura Lippman	“Scratch a Woman”	Hardly Knew Her	Finalist	
2009	Toni L. P. Kelner	“Skull and Cross Examination”	Ellery Queen's Mystery Magazine	Finalist	
2010	Hank Phillippi Ryan	“On the House”	Quarry: Crime Stories by New England Writers	Winner	
2010	Ace Atkins	“Last Fair Deal Gone Down”	Crossroad Blues	Finalist	
2010	Dana Cameron	“Femme Sole”	Boston Noir	Finalist	
2010	Dennis Lehane	“Animal Rescue”	Boston Noir	Finalist	
2010	Luis Alberto Urrea	“Amapola”	Phoenix Noir	Finalist	
2011	Dana Cameron	“Swing Shift”	by Moonlight	Winner	
2011	Chris Holm	“The Hitter”	Needle	Finalist	
2011	Doug Allyn	“Scent of Lilacs”	Ellery Queen's Mystery Magazine	Finalist	
2011	Mary Jane Maffini	“So Much in Common”	Ellery Queen's Mystery Magazine	Finalist	
2011	Patricia Morin	“Homeless”	Mystery Montage	Finalist	
2011	Simon Wood	“The Frame Maker”	The Back Alley	Finalist	
2012	Dana Cameron	“Disarming”	Ellery Queen's Mystery Magazine	Winner	
2012	Barb Goffman	“Truth and Consequences”	Mystery Times Ten	Finalist	
2012	Daryl Wood Gerber	“Palace by the Lake”	Fish Tales: The Guppy Anthology	Finalist	
2012	Neil Gaiman	“The Case of Death and Honey”	A Study in Sherlock	Finalist	
2012	Roberta Isleib	“The Itinerary”	MWA Presents The Rich and The Dead	Finalist	
2012	Twist Phelan	“Happine$$”	MWA Presents The Rich and The Dead	Finalist	
2013	Dana Cameron	“Mischief in Mesopotamia”	Ellery Queen's Mystery Magazine	Winner	
2013	Barb Goffman	“The Lord is My Shamus”	Crimes: This Job is Murder	Finalist	
2013	Karin Slaughter	“The Unremarkable Heart”	MWA Presents: Vengeance	Finalist	
2013	Shelia Connolly	“Kept in the Dark”	Best New England Crime Stories: Blood Moon	Finalist	
2013	Todd Robinson	“Peaches”	Grift	Finalist	
2014	John Connolly	“The Caxton Private Lending Library & Book Depository”	Blibiomysteries, The Mysterious Bookshop	Winner	
2014	Art Taylor	“The Care and Feeding of Houseplants”	Ellery Queen's Mystery Magazine	Finalist	
2014	Craig Faustus Buck	“Dead End”	Untreed Reads	Finalist	
2014	Denise Dietz	“Annie and the Grateful Dead”	The Sound and the Furry	Finalist	
2014	Travis Richardson	“Incident on the 405”	Malfeasance Occasional: Girl Trouble	Finalist	
2015	Art Taylor	“The Odds Are Against Us”	Ellery Queen's Mystery Magazine	Winner	
2015	Barb Goffman	“The Shadow Knows”	Chesapeake Crimes: Homicidal Holidays	Finalist	
2015	Craig Faustus Buck	“Honeymoon Sweet”	Murder at the Beach: The Bouchercon Anthology 2014	Finalist	
2015	John Shepphird	“Of Dogs & Deceit”	Alfred Hitchcock Mystery Magazine	Finalist	
2015	Paul D. Marks	“Howling at the Moon”	Ellery Queen's Mystery Magazine	Finalist	
2016	Megan Abbott	“The Little Men”	A Bibliomystery by MysteriousPress.com	Winner	
2016	Johnny Shaw	“Feliz Navidead”	Thuglit Presents: Cruel Yule: Holiday Tales of Crime for People on the Naughty List	Finalist	
2016	Erin Mitchell	“Old Hands”	Dark City Lights	Finalist	
2016	Hilary Davidson	“The Siege”	Ellery Queen's Mystery Magazine	Finalist	
2016	Holly West	“Don't Fear the Ripper”	Protectors 2: Heroes	Finalist	
2016	Travis Richardson	“Quack and Dwight”	Jewish Noir: Contemporary Tales of Crime and Other Dark Deeds	Finalist	
2017	Megan Abbott	“Oxford Girl”	Mississippi Noir	Winner	
2017	Art Taylor	“Parallel Play”	Chesapeake Crimes: Storm Warning	Finalist	
2017	Holly West	“Queen of the Dogs”	44 Caliber Funk: Tales of Crime, Soul and Payback	Finalist	
2017	Johnny Shaw	“Gary's Got A Boner”	Waiting To Be Forgotten: Stories of Crime and Heartbreak, Inspired by the Replacements	Finalist	
2017	Lawrence Block	“Autumn at the Automat”	In Sunlight or Shadow: Stories Inspired by the Paintings of Edward Hopper	Finalist	
2018	Hilary Davidson	“My Side of the Matter”	Killing Malmon	Winner	
2018	Art Taylor	“A Necessary Ingredient”	Killers of the Flower Moon: The Osage Murders and the Birth of the FBI	Finalist	
2018	Barb Goffman	“Whose Wine Is It Anyway”	50 Shades of Cabernet	Finalist	
2018	Debra Goldstein	“The Night They Burned Miss Dixie’s Place”	Alfred Hitchcock Mystery Magazine	Finalist	
2018	Jen Conley	“God's Gonna Cut You Down”	Just to Watch Them Die: Crime Fiction Inspired by the Songs of Johnny Cash	Finalist	
2018	Susanna Calkins	“The Trial of Madame Pelletier”	Charlaine Harris Presents Malice Domestic 12: Mystery Most Historical	Finalist	
2019	S. A. Cosby	“The Grass Beneath My Feet”	Tough Magazine	Winner	
2019	Art Taylor	“English 398: Fiction Workshop”	Ellery Queen's Mystery Magazine	Finalist	
2019	Barb Goffman	“Bug Appétit”	Ellery Queen's Mystery Magazine	Finalist	
2019	Greg Herren	“Cold Beer No Flies”	Florida Happens	Finalist	
2019	Holly West	“The Best Laid Plans”	Florida Happens	Finalist	
2020	Alex Segura	“The Red Zone”	Pa'que Tu Lo Sepas!: Stories to Benefit the People of Puerto Rico	Winner	
2020	Art Taylor	“Better Days”	Ellery Queen's Mystery Magazine	Finalist	
2020	Art Taylor	“Hard Return”	Crime Travel	Finalist	
2020	Hector Acosta	“Turistas”	Pa'que Tu Lo Sepas!: Stories to Benefit the People of Puerto Rico	Finalist	
2020	Hilary Davidson	“Unforgiven”	Murder-a-Go-Go's: Crime Fiction Inspired by the Music of the Go-Go's	Finalist	
2021	Alex Segura	“90 Miles”	Both Sides: Stories from the Border	Winner	
2021	Art Taylor	“The Boy Detective & The Summer of ’74”	Alfred Hitchcock Mystery Magazine	Finalist	
2021	Barb Goffman	“Dear Emily Etiquette”	Ellery Queen's Mystery Magazine	Finalist	
2021	Gabriel Valjan	“Elysian Fields”	California Schemin’: The 2020 Bouchercon Anthology	Finalist	
2021	James W. Ziskin	“The Twenty-Five Year Engagement”	In League with Sherlock Holmes	Finalist	
2022	S. A. Cosby	“Not My Cross to Bear”	Down & Out Books	Winner	
2022	E. A. Aymar	“The Search for Eric Garcia”		Finalist	
2022	Gabriel Valjan	“Burnt Ends”		Finalist	
2022	Gigi Pandian	“The Locked Room Library”	Ellery Queen's Mystery Magazine	Finalist	
2022	Richie Narvaez	“Doc's at Midnight”		Finalist	
2022	Tracy Clark	“Lucky Thirteen”	Midnight Hour	Finalist	
2022	V. M. Burns	“The Vermeer Conspiracy”	Midnight Hour	Finalist	
2023	Barb Goffman	“Beauty and the Beyotch”	Sherlock Holmes Mystery Magazine	Winner	
2023	Bruce Robert Coffin	“The Impediment”	Deadly Nightshade: Best New England Crime Stories 2022	Finalist	
2023	Curtis Ippolito	“The Estate Sale”	Vautrin Magazine	Finalist	
2023	E. A. Aymar	“Still Crazy After All These Years”	Paranoia Blues: Crime Fiction Inspired by the Songs of Paul Simon	Finalist	
2023	Gabriel Valjan	“C.O.D.”	Low Down Dirty Vote Volume 3: The Color of My Vote	Finalist	
