= Bouchercon XXXIV =

2003 mystery and detective fiction convention

- "Where the Odds Favor Mystery"
- Date: October 16, 2003
- Location: Las Vegas, Nevada
- Country: USA
- Hosted by: Deen Kogan

Bouchercon is an annual convention of creators and devotees of mystery and detective fiction. It is named in honour of writer, reviewer, and editor Anthony Boucher; also the inspiration for the Anthony Awards, which have been issued at the convention since 1986. This page details Bouchercon XXXIV and the 18th Anthony Awards ceremony.

== Bouchercon ==
The convention was held in Las Vegas, Nevada on October 16, 2003; running until the 19th. The event was chaired by Deen Kogan, founder of the Society Hill playhouse.

=== Special Guests ===
- American Guest of Honor — James Lee Burke
- International Guest of Honor — Ian Rankin
- Fan Guests of Honor — Ann and Jeff Smith
- Toastmaster — Lee Child
- Memorial Honoree — Hal Rice
- Contribution to the Field award — Janet Hutchings
- Exemplary Body of Work award — Ruth Rendell

== Anthony Awards ==
The following list details the awards distributed at the eighteenth annual Anthony Awards ceremony.

=== Novel award ===
Winner:

- Michael Connelly, City of Bones

Shortlist:

- Cara Black, Murder in the Sentier
- Steve Hamilton, North of Nowhere
- George Pelecanos, Hell to Pay
- S. J. Rozan, Winter and Night

=== First novel award ===
Winner:

- Julia Spencer-Fleming, In the Bleak Midwinter

Shortlist:

- David Corbett, The Devil's Redhead
- Libby Fischer Hellmann, An Eye for Murder
- Jonathon King, The Blue Edge of Midnight
- Eddie Muller, The Distance

=== Paperback original award ===
Winner:

- Robin Burcell, Fatal Truth

Shortlist:

- Jeff Abbott, Black Jack Point
- Roberta Isleib, Six Strokes Under
- P. J. Parrish, Paint it Black
- Andy Straka, A Killing Sky

=== Short story award ===
Winner:

- Marcia Talley, "Too Many Cooks", from Much Ado About Murder

Shortlist:

- Lauren Haney, "Murder in the Land of Wawat", from The Mammoth Book of Egyptian Whodunnits
- Clark Howard, "To Live and Die in Midland, Texas", from Ellery Queen's Mystery Magazine September / October 2002
- Toni Kelner, "Bible Belt", from Ellery Queen's Mystery Magazine June 2002
- Bob Truluck, "A Man Called Ready", from Measures of Poison

=== Critical / Non-fiction award ===
Winner:

- Jim Huang, They Died in vain: Overlooked, Underappreciated and Forgotten Mystery Novels

Shortlist:

- Mike Ashley, The Mammoth Encyclopedia of Modern Crime Fiction
- Jeffrey Marks, Intent To Sell: Marking the Genre Novel

=== Cover art award ===
Winner:

- Michael Kellner; for Dennis McMillan, Measures of Poison

Shortlist:

- Jennifer Harris & Melissa Farris; for Daniel Chavarria, The Eye of Cybele
- Cheryl L. Cipriani; for Cara Black, Murder in the Sentier
- Larry Rostant; for John Fusco, Paradise Salvage
- Paul Buckley; for Andrea Camilleri, The Terracotta Dog
