= Bouchercon XL =

2009 mystery and detective fiction convention

- "Elementary, My Dear Indy!"
- Date: October 15, 2009
- Location: Indianapolis, Indiana
- Country: USA
- Hosted by: Jim Huang, Mike Bursaw

Bouchercon is an annual convention of creators and devotees of mystery and detective fiction. It is named in honour of writer, reviewer, and editor Anthony Boucher, who is also the inspiration for the Anthony Awards, which have been issued at the convention since 1986. This page details Bouchercon XL and the 24th Anthony Awards ceremony.

== Bouchercon ==
The convention was held in Indianapolis, Indiana on October 15, 2009; running until the 18th. The event was chaired by critical / non-fiction writer and owner of The Mystery Company bookshop Jim Huang; and Mike Bursaw, owner of the Indianapolis Mystery Mike's bookshop.

=== Special Guests ===
- Lifetime Achievement award — Allen J. Hubin
- Guest of Honor — Michael Connelly
- Toastmaster — S. J. Rozan
- Honored Youth Author — Wendelin Van Draanen
- Fan Guest of Honor — Kathryn Kennison

== Anthony Awards ==
The following list details the awards distributed at the twenty-fourth annual Anthony Awards ceremony, located at the Hilbert Circle Theatre.

=== Novel award ===
Winner:

- Michael Connelly, The Brass Verdict

Shortlist:

- Sean Chercover, Trigger City
- William Kent Krueger, Red Knife
- Stieg Larsson, The Girl with the Dragon Tattoo
- Louise Penny, The Cruelest Month

=== First novel award ===
Winner:

- Stieg Larsson, The Girl with the Dragon Tattoo

Shortlist:

- Rosemary Harris, Pushing Up Daisies
- Julie Kramer, Stalking Susan
- G. M. Malliet, Death of a Cozy Writer
- Tom Rob Smith, Child 44

=== Paperback original award ===
Winner:

- Julie Hyzy, State of the Onion

Shortlist:

- Max Allan Collins, The First Quarry
- Christa Faust, Money Shot
- Vicki Lane, In a Dark Season
- P. J. Parrish, South of Hell

=== Short story award ===
Winner:

- Sean Chercover, "A Sleep Not Unlike Death", from Hardcore Hardboiled

Shortlist:

- Dana Cameron, "The Night Things Changed", from Wolfsbane and Mistletoe
- Jane K. Cleland, "Killing Time", from Alfred Hitchcock's Mystery Magazine November 2008
- Toni L. P. Kelner, "Skull and Cross-Examinations", from Ellery Queen's Mystery Magazine February 2008
- Laura Lippman, "Scratch a Woman", from Hardly Knew Her
- Kristine Kathryn Rusch, "The Secret Lives of Cats", from Ellery Queen's Mystery Magazine July 2008

=== Critical / Non-fiction award ===
Winner:

- Jeffrey Marks, Anthony Boucher: A Biobibliography

Shortlist:

- Frankie Y. Bailey, African American Mystery Writers: A Historical and Thematic Study
- Kathy Lynn Emerson, How to Write Killer Historical Mysteries
- Kate Summerscale, The Suspicions of Mr. Whicher: A Shocking Murder and the Undoing of a Great Victorian Detective

=== Young adult award ===
Winner:

- Chris Grabenstein, The Crossroads

Shortlist:

- John Green, Paper Towns
- Lauren Henderson, Kiss Me, Kill Me
- Trenton Lee Stewart, The Mysterious Benedict Society and the Perilous Journey
- Wendelin Van Draanen, Sammy Keyes and the Cold Hard Cash

=== Cover art award ===
Winner:

- Peter Mendelsund; for Stieg Larsson, The Girl with the Dragon Tattoo

Shortlist:

- David Rotstein; for Linda L. Richards, Death Was the Other Woman
- David Rotstein; for Elizabeth Zelvin, Death Will Get You Sober
- David Rotstein; for Louise Ure, The Fault Tree
- Steve Cooley; for Christa Faust, Money Shot

=== Special service award ===
Winner:

- Jon Jordan and Ruth Jordan, Crimespree Magazine

Shortlist:

- Ali Karim, Shots magazine
- David Montgomery
- Gary Warren Niebuhr
- Sarah Weinman
