= Time Release (novel) =

1997 crime novel by Martin J. Smith

- First edition
- Author: Martin J. Smith
- Language: English
- Genre: Novel
- Publisher: Berkeley Publishing Group
- Publication date: 1997
- Publication place: USA
- Media type: Print (Paperback)
- Pages: 344
- ISBN: 0-515-12028-6
- Followed by: Shadow Image

Time Release is a crime novel by the American writer Martin J. Smith (1956-) set in Pittsburgh, Pennsylvania.

It tells the story of a killer who used pain relief capsules, as well as other techniques, to set off a series of poisonings. It also focuses on repressed memories and if, when and how they will come out. The protagonist is psychologist and memory expert Jim Christensen who tries to solve the case.

Time Release was a finalist for the 1998 Anthony Award for Best Paperback Original.

== Reception ==
Calling the book "a good creepy debut thriller", Publishers Weekly said "Downing makes a fine tortured character though the equally traumatized Christensen isn't as likable and is also plagued by Smith's many meanderings into his personal life." The Missoula Independent's Christopher Weir wrote that "Smith's prose reveals an increasingly rare commodity in popular fiction: finesse. The plot is intricate, but never confusing."

== Sources ==
Contemporary Authors Online. The Gale Group, 2006. PEN (Permanent Entry Number): 0000132047.
