= Shadow Image =

1998 novel by Martin J. Smith

- First edition
- Author: Martin J. Smith
- Language: English
- Genre: Novel
- Publisher: Berkeley Publishing Group
- Publication date: 1998
- Publication place: USA
- Media type: Print (Paperback)
- Pages: 344
- ISBN: 0-515-12286-6
- Preceded by: Time Release (novel)
- Followed by: Straw Men (novel)

Shadow Image is a crime novel by the American writer Martin J. Smith (1956-) set in Pittsburgh, Pennsylvania.

It tells the story of psychologist Jim Christensen's work with Alzheimer's patients and his studies in repressed memory. Now, his most famous patient, the grand matriarch of a powerful political family, has injured herself in a fall. As Christensen studies his patient's art therapy paintings, he unveils a secret locked within the woman's mind that could destroy her family's political ambitions.

== Reception ==
Oline H. Cogdill of the South Florida Sun Sentinel called it a "worthy follow-up" to Time Release and opined that Smith "keeps the tension high and the characters realistic." Christopher Weir of the Missoula Independent wrote that the novel "cultivates a compassionate study in Alzheimer's while delivering a broad slap to the Camelot-style delusions that still maintain serious leverage at the American ballot box." Lev Raphael of the Detroit Free Press opined that while the protagonist's background and life "aren't quite believable", Smith "handles almost everything else defly" and is "especially convincing with the tragedy of losing someone to dementia and with showing the wildly distorting effects of the greed for power."

== Sources ==
Contemporary Authors Online. The Gale Group, 2006. PEN (Permanent Entry Number): 0000132047.
