= Josie Marcus =

Josie Marcus may refer to:

- Josephine Marcus, who later married Wyatt Earp
- Josie Marcus (Scandal), a fictional character on the U.S. TV series Scandal
- Josie Marcus, Mystery Shopper, a series of books by author Elaine Viets
