= Fear (Abbott novel) =

2006 thriller novel by Jeff Abbott

- First edition (publ. Dutton)
- Author: Jeff Abbott
- Genre: Thriller
- Publisher: Dutton
- Publication date: August 17, 2006
- ISBN: 978-0-525-94972-5

Fear is a 2006 thriller novel by American writer Jeff Abbott. Texas Monthly described the novel as a "pharmaco-thriller about a clandestine medical clinic".

== Plot ==
Miles Kendrick has post-traumatic stress disorder and is in a witness protection program. When his psychiatrist is targeted and killed he feels somehow responsible and sets about trying to find out why she was killed and avenge her death. A constant companion is his best friend whom he killed some time in the past.
