= Kathy Lynn Emerson =

American novelist

Kathy Lynn Emerson is an American writer of historical and mystery novels and non-fiction. She also uses the pseudonyms Kaitlyn Dunnett and Kate Emerson.

Emerson writes historical mysteries as Kathy Lynn Emerson, historical fiction set in royal courts as Kate Emerson, and contemporary mystery books as Kaitlyn Dunnett. Her book How to Write Killer Historical Mysteries was nominated for two industry awards and won the 2008 Agatha Award for Best Non-Fiction.

Emerson was born and grew up in New York state. After graduating from Bates College in Lewiston, Maine, she continued for graduate school at Old Dominion University in Norfolk, Virginia. She also taught at Tidewater Community College in Virginia Beach, Virginia. She now lives on a Christmas tree farm in Wilton, Maine, with her husband and three cats.

== Mysteries as Kaitlyn Dunnett ==
As Kaitlyn Dunnett, she writes the Liss MacCrimmon Mystery Series, published by Kensington Books. These are:

- Kilt Dead, novel originally published in 2007
- Scone Cold Dead, novel originally published in 2008
- A Wee Christmas Homicide, novel originally published in 2009
- The Corpse Wore Tartan, novel originally published in 2010
- Scotched, novel originally published in 2011
- Bagpipes, Brides, and Homicides, novel originally published in 2012
- Vampires, Bones, and Treacle Scones, novel originally published in 2013
- Ho-Ho-Homicide, novel originally published in 2014
- The Scottie Barked At Midnight, novel originally published in 2015

== Historical fiction as Kate Emerson ==
As Kate Emerson, she writes historical non-mystery fiction set in the 16th century. The Secrets of the Tudor Court series comprises:

- The Pleasure Palace, novel originally published in 2009
- Between Two Queens, novel originally published in 2010
- By Royal Decree, novel originally published in 2010
- At the King's Pleasure, novel originally published in 2012
- The King's Damsel, novel originally published in 2012

== Historical mysteries as Kathy Lynn Emerson ==
She writes historical mysteries as Kathy Lynn Emerson.

The Face Down Mysteries feature Susanna, Lady Appleton, a 16th-century gentlewoman, herbalist, and sleuth. In chronological order, they are:

- “The Body in the Dovecote” (1552), short story
- “Much Ado About Murder” (1556), short story
- Face Down in the Marrow-Bone Pie (1559), novel originally published in 1997
- “The Rubaiyat of Nicholas Baldwin” (1559), short story
- Face Down Upon an Herbal (1561), novel originally published in 1998
- “Lady Appleton and the London Man” (1562), short story
- Face Down Among the Winchester Geese (1563), novel originally published in 1999
- “Lady Appleton and the Cautionary Herbal” (1564), short story
- Face Down Beneath the Eleanor Cross (1565), novel originally published in 2000
- Face Down Under the Wych Elm (1567), novel originally published in 2000
- Face Down Before Rebel Hooves (1569), novel originally published in 2001
- “The Riddle of the Woolsack” (1569), short story
- Face Down Across the Western Sea (1571), novel originally published in 2002
- “Lady Appleton and the Cripplegate Chrisoms” (1572), short story
- “Lady Appleton and the Bristol Crystals” (1572), short story
- Face Down Below the Banqueting House (1573), novel originally published in 2005
- Face Down Beside St. Anne's Well (1575), novel originally published in 2006
- “Encore for a Neck Verse” (1576), short story
- “Confusions Most Monstrous” (1577), short story
- “Death by Devil's Turnips” (1577), short story
- Face Down O’er the Border (1577), novel originally published 2007
- “Any Means Short of Murder” (1579), short story
- “A Wondrous Violent Motion” (1580), short story, published in December 2013 Alfred Hitchcock’s Mystery Magazine
- “The Curse of the Figure Flinger” (1585), short story
- “Lady Appleton and the Yuletide Hogglers” (1586), short story
- Murders and Other Confusions: The Chronicles of Susanna, Lady Appleton, Gentlewoman, Herbalist, and Sleuth, anthology of short stories, published by Crippen & Landru, 2004
- Crimes and Confusions, anthology of short stories, published in 2010

The Diana Spaulding 1888 Mysteries or Diana Spaulding 1888 Quartet feature a journalist from late 19th-century America. In chronological order, they are:

- Deadlier than the Pen (set in March 1888), novel originally published in 2004
- “The Kenduskeag Killer” (set in early April 1888), short story
- “The Telltale Twinkle” (set in early April 1888), short story
- Fatal as a Fallen Woman (set in April 1888), novel originally published in 2005
- No Mortal Reason (set in May 1888), novel originally published in 2007
- Lethal Legend (set in June 1888), novel originally published in 2008
- Crimes and Confusions, anthology of short stories

== Other titles as Kathy Lynn Emerson ==
Emerson has written a number of other fiction titles. These include:

- 4 books for young readers aged 8–12, originally published from 1985 to 1991
- 14 romance novels, originally published in 1990s, that are currently out of print
- Someday, a romantic suspense novel for young adults, originally published in 2001
- Shalla, an American colonial-era historical novel for young readers, originally published in 2010

She also has three book-length nonfiction titles:

- Wives and Daughters: The Women of Sixteenth Century England, originally published in 1984; replaced by the revised and enlarged A Who's Who of Tudor Women
- The Writer’s Guide to Everyday Life in Renaissance England, originally published in 1996
- How to Write Killer Historical Mysteries: The Art and Adventure of Sleuthing Through the Past, originally published in 2008

== Awards ==
- Winner of the 2008 Agatha Award for Best Non-Fiction: How to Write Killer Historical Mysteries
- Nominated for the 2009 Anthony Award for Best Critical Non-fiction Work: How to Write Killer Historical Mysteries
