= Doc in the Box =

2000 book

- Author: Elaine Viets
- Language: English
- Genre: Mystery fiction, Crime fiction
- Publisher: Dell
- Publication date: 11 July 2000
- Publication place: United States
- ISBN: 1625673469
- OCLC: 1132389684

Doc in the Box is a mystery fiction novel written by American author and newspaperwoman Elaine Viets. The fourth entry in the Francesca Vierling series, it follows Vierling, a newspaper columnist, as she investigates the gunning down of three local medical professionals.

== Reception ==
Oline H. Cogdill of the South Florida Sun Sentinel opined that Viets "delivers a compelling look at the frustrations and despair of cancer patients while augmenting her solid plot with humor." John Hanchette of the Gannett News Service wrote: "Viet knows how to get the reader from point A to point B, with some fine fulfilling reading in between." Rochelle O'Gorman of the Los Angeles Times wrote: "While the fictional reporter-detective is nothing new, Vierling has an earthiness and brusque humour that is refreshing." Publishers Weekly stated: "Those hoping for a surprise ending will be disappointed, but there is a perverse satisfaction in seeing revenge taken for all the people who are not only victims of cancer but of the medical system itself."
