= Murder in Focus =

1989 novel by Caroline Roe

- Author: Caroline Roe
- Language: English
- Genre: Mystery fiction, Crime fiction
- Publisher: Viking Penguin
- Publication date: 1989
- Publication place: Canada
- ISBN: 0684190826
- OCLC: 19324597
- Preceded by: Murder on the Run
- Followed by: Murder in a Good Cause

Murder in Focus is a mystery fiction novel written by Canadian author Caroline Roe under the pen name Medora Sale. It is the second novel of hers to feature the character John Sanders, an inspector from the Toronto homicide squad, and introduces Harriet Jeffries, an architectural photographer who aids in the investigation.

== Reception ==
Jenni Mortin of The StarPhoenix called the novel "interesting" and "true to its setting", and praised central relationship and characters, stating: "Sanders and Jeffries, whose attraction for each other grows in a natural and delightful way, are a couple of clever and human detectives." Robin Skelton of the Toronto Star opines that Roe "avoids traditional formulae and limitations" and "has given a new spin to the theme for the less than perfect detective", calling the novel "unforgettable".

Peter Wilson of the Vancouver Sun called it a "solid series debut", praising the two protagonists and its depiction of "the lack of cooperation between Canada's metropolitan forces, the RCMP and the Canadian Security and Intelligence Service", while criticising its "constant scene changes and switches back and forth in points of view." Jerry Petryshyn of the Grande Prairie Daily Herald-Tribune called it "nicely-paced" and "well-penned". Sandy Stone of the Ottawa Citizen called it "straightforward" and "standard".
