= Deadly Legacy =

2003 novel by Robin Burcell

- First edition
- Author: Robin Burcell
- Series: Kate Gillespie (#3)
- Genre: Mystery fiction, Thriller
- Published: 2003
- Publisher: Avon Books
- Pages: 304
- Awards: Anthony Award for Best Paperback Original (2004)
- ISBN: 978-0-061-05787-8
- Preceded by: Fatal Truth
- Followed by: Cold Case
- Website: robinburcell.com/deadly-legacy1.php

Deadly Legacy is a mystery novel written by American author Robin Burcell, published by Avon Books on January 28, 2003. It is the third book in the Kate Gillespie series, featuring a homicide detective for the San Francisco Police Department. The novel won the Anthony Award for Best Paperback Original in 2004.
