= Murder in a Good Cause =

Mystery fiction novel written by Caroline Roe

- Title page for Murder in a Good Cause (1990)
- Author: Caroline Roe
- Language: English
- Genre: Mystery fiction, Crime fiction
- Publisher: Scribner's
- Publication date: 1990
- Publication place: Canada
- ISBN: 144344376X
- OCLC: 21029582
- Preceded by: Murder in Focus
- Followed by: Sleep of the Innocent

Murder in a Good Cause is a mystery fiction novel written by Canadian author Caroline Roe under the pen name Medora Sale. The novel follows Inspector John Sanders of the Toronto police and architectural photographer Harriet Jeffries as they investigate the poisoning of wealthy German actress Frau von Hohenkammer, as well as a string of burglaries which results in the murder of a woman who happens to be home when the burglars strike.

== Reception ==
Margaret Cannon of The Globe and Mail called the novel a "classic whodunnit with a neat twist", praising the characterisation, considering it Roe's "strength". Mary Campbell of the Associated Press criticised the "slightly unconvincing" central relationship, praising the suspense, writing and plotting. Sandy Stone of the Ottawa Citizen opined that the novel "lacks the excitement generated by the complicated political plot in the superb first Sanders/Jeffries mystery, Murder in Focus, but it's still competent and satisfying."
