= Alex Segura =

American author of mystery novels and comics writer and editor

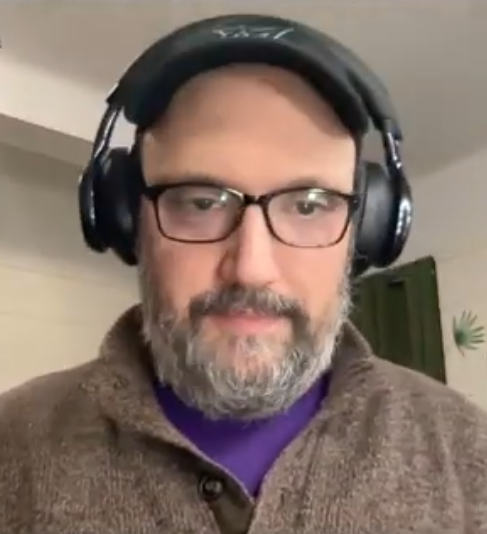
- In a 2026 interview
- Born: Alex Segura; 1980 (age 45–46)
- Areas: Writer, Artist, Editor
- Notable works: Spider-Society, Star Wars: Battle of Jakku, The Question: All Along the Watchtower, Secret Identity, Alter Ego, Araña and Spider-Man 2099: Dark Tomorrow, Poe Dameron: Free Fall

Alex Segura (born 1980) is an American author, comic book writer, artist, and editor. He has written numerous comics and novels, including Secret Identity, which won the 2023 Los Angeles Times Book Prize for Mystery/Thriller.

== Biography ==
Segura was born in 1980 and raised in Miami. His parents were exiled from Cuba.

Segura began his career as a journalist, which has inspired his series about Pete Fernandez.

In 2003, Segura moved to New York and began working for publishing companies, including with Wizard World and DC Comics. In 2009, he became the senior vice president of sales and marketing at Archie Comics, then was named DC Comic's executive director of publicity. By 2017, he had returned to Archie Comics, where he also served as the editor for Dark Circle Comics. Segura joined Oni Press as senior vice president of sales and marketing in 2021. Along with other members of the organization's leadership, Segura was fired in 2023.

Segura published his debut novel, Silent City, with Codorus Press in 2013; it was republished with Polis Books in 2016.

King Features Syndicate named Segura as the new writer on their comic strip The Phantom on October 15, 2026.

Segura resides with his wife and children in New York.

== Awards ==
Booklist, Kirkus Reviews, NPR, and the Sun Sentinel named Secret Identity one of the best mystery novels of the year.

Awards for Segura's writing
Year	Title	Award	Result	Ref.
2018	Dangerous Ends	Bill Crider Award for Novel in a Series	Finalist	
2019	Blackout	Anthony Award for Best Novel	Finalist	
2020	Miami Midnight	Anthony Award for Best Novel	Finalist	
2020	"The Red Zone"	Anthony Award for Best Short Story	Winner	
2021	"90 Miles"	Anthony Award for Best Short Story	Winner	
2021	Star Wars Poe Dameron: Free Fall	Anthony Award for Best Young Adult Novel	Finalist	
2023	Araña and Spider-Man 2099: Dark Tomorrow	Agatha Award for Best Children’s/YA Novel	Finalist	
2023	Secret Identity	Anthony Award for Best Hardcover	Finalist	
2023	Secret Identity	Barry Award for Best Novel	Finalist	
2023	Secret Identity	Lefty Award for Best Mystery	Finalist	
2023	Secret Identity	Los Angeles Times Book Prize for Mystery/Thriller	Winner	
2023	Secret Identity	Macavity Award for Best Novel	Finalist	

== Publications ==
=== Pete Fernandez books ===
- Silent City. Codorus Press. 2013. ISBN 978-0-9839783-6-7.
- Down the Darkest Street. Polis Books. 2016. ISBN 978-1-940610-75-7.
- Dangerous Ends. Polis Books. 2017. ISBN 978-1-943818-25-9.
- Blackout. Polis Books. 2018. ISBN 978-1-947993-04-4.
- Miami Midnight. Polis Books. 2019. ISBN 978-1-947993-59-4.

=== Carmen Valdez books ===
- Secret Identity. Flatiron Books. 2022. ISBN 978-1-250-80174-6.
- Alter Ego. Flatiron Books. 2024. ISBN 978-1250801777.

=== Standalone books ===
- Star Wars Poe Dameron: Free Fall. Disney Lucasfilm Press. 2020. ISBN 978-1368051668.
- Araña and Spider-Man 2099: Dark Tomorrow. Marvel Press. 2023. ISBN 978-1368079006.
- ——; Rob Hart (2024). Dark Space. Blackstone Publishing, Inc. ISBN 979-8212638340.
- Encanto: Nightmares and Sueños. Disney Press. 2024. ISBN 978-1368097901.

== Comic bibliography ==
=== Marvel Comics ===
- Avengers Unlimited Infinity Comic #33-36 (2023)
- Spider-Verse:
  - Edge of Spider-Verse vol. 2 #1, short story "The Hero Within" (2022)
  - Edge of Spider-Verse vol. 3 #4, short story "Charging Station" (2023)
  - Edge of Spider-Verse vol. 4 #1, 4, short stories "Prologue" and "In the Crosshairs" (2024)
  - Web of Spider-Man vol. 3 #1, short story "Spider-Society" (2024)
  - Spider-Society #1-4 (2024)
- Star Wars:
  - Sar Wars: Return of the Jedi - The Rebellion #1 (2023)
  - Star Wars: Battle of Jakku - Insurgency Rising #1-4 (2024)
  - Star Wars: Battle of Jakku - Republic Under Siege #1-4 (2024)
  - Star Wars: Battle of Jakku - Last Stand' #1-4 (2024-2025)
- Marvel's Voices: Comunidades #1, short story "Homecoming" (2021)
- Marvel's Voices: Comunidades vol. 2 #1, short story "Secret Savior" (2022)
- Marvel's Voices Infinity Comic #78-79 (2023)
- Marvel Zombies: Black, White, & Blood #1, short story "Hope" (2023)
- What If...? Galactus Transformed Moon Knight #1 (2025)
- Who Is... America Chavez Infinity Comic #1 (2022)
- Who Is... Ms. Marvel Infinity Comic #1 (2023)
- X-Men Unlimited Infinity Comic #96-99 (2023)

=== DC Comics ===
- Batman: The Brave and the Bold vol. 2 #15-17, three-part story "Duality" (2024)
- DCU Halloween Special 2010 #1, short story "Time or Your Life!" (2010)
- Knight Terrors: Green Lantern #1-2, backup story (2023)
- Lazarus Planet: Legends Reborn #1, short story "Masks and Monsters" (2023)
- The Question: All Along the Watchtower #1-6 (2024–2025)
- Superman: Kal-El Returns #1, short story "Home" (2023)

=== Archie Comics ===
- Archie & Friends #156, "The Great Riverdale Comic Con" (2011)
- Archie #627-630, "Archie Meets KISS" (2011–2012)
- Archie #635, 639, 659, 660 (2012–2014)
- Archie Meets Ramones #1 (2016), co-written with Matthew Rosenberg
- The Archies: One Shot #1 (2017), co-written with Matthew Rosenberg
- The Archies #1-7 (2017–2018), co-written with Matthew Rosenberg
- Archie Meets the B-52s #1 (2020), co-written with Matthew Rosenberg

=== Other companies ===
- AHOY Comics
  - Project: Cryptid #2, short story "Diana Montalvan and the Ivory-Billed Woodpecker" (2023)
- Dark Horse
  - The Black Ghost #1-5 (2021)
  - The Black Ghost vol. 2 #1-5, collected as The Black Ghost: Shame the Devil (2023)
- Humanoids
  - First Degree: A Crime Anthology, short story "The Raincoat" (2021)
- Image Comics
  - Lazarus Risen #6, text story "Turnabout" (2021)
- Mad Cave Studios
  - Dick Tracy #1-present (2024–present), co-written with Michael Moreci
  - The Legendary Lynx #1 (2024)
- Chispa Comics
  - The Dusk #1-4 (2025)
- The Legendary Lynx #1 (2024)
- National Public Radio
  - The Mysterious Micro-Face in Sound Advice #1 (2022)
