= The Day She Died =

2014 novel by Catriona McPherson

- First edition
- Author: Catriona McPherson
- Genre: Mystery fiction, Thriller
- Published: 2014
- Publisher: Midnight Ink Books
- Pages: 301
- Awards: Anthony Award for Best Paperback Original (2015)
- ISBN: 978-0-738-74045-4
- Website: The Day She Died

The Day She Died is a 2014 novel by Scottish writer Catriona McPherson, published by Midnight Ink Books on 8 May 2014. It won the 2015 Anthony Award for Best Paperback Original.
