= Collision (novel) =

2008 thriller novel by Jeff Abbott

- First edition (Dutton)
- Author: Jeff Abbott
- Language: English
- Publication date: 2008

Collision is a 2008 thriller novel by Jeff Abbott. The novel was also known as Run in the UK.

== Plot ==
Ben Forsberg is an independent contractor who has buried himself in his work after the death of his wife. Everything changes when two government agents turn up on his door to question him for a murder involving a notorious assassin.

== Critical reception ==
A Richmond Times reviewer said "the pacing...is top-rate" and that the book has "enough twists and turns...to make the reader dizzy".
