= Johnny Shaw (author) =

American author (born c. 1970)

- Born: c. 1970; California, USA
- Education: University of California, Los Angeles (MFA)
- Notable awards: Anthony Award for Best Paperback Original; 2013 Big Maria

Johnny Shaw (born c. 1970) is an American author and playwright. He has won two Spotted Owl Awards, as well as an Anthony Award.

== Biography ==
Shaw was born and raised in California near the border of Mexico. He received a Master of Fine Arts in screenwriting from the University of California, Los Angeles.

Shaw's debut novel, Dove Season, was published in 2011 by Thomas & Mercer; it won the Spotted Owl Award for Best First Novel. His sophomore novel, Big Maria, won the 2013 Anthony Award for Best Paperback Original, and his third novel, Plaster City, won the Spotted Owl Award for Best Novel. He has since published more novels and short stories, some of which have been finalists for various awards.

In addition to writing, Shaw is the editor-in-chief of Blood & Tacos, an online quarterly magazine. He has also taught screenwriting at Santa Barbara City College and University of California, Santa Barbara, and owns Johnny's Used Books, an online used bookstore.

Shaw lives with his wife, Roxanne Patruznick, in Portland, Oregon.

== Awards and honors ==
Awards for Shaw's writing
Year	Title	Award	Result	Ref.
2010	Dove Season	Amazon Breakthrough Novel Award	Finalist	
2012	Dove Season	Spotted Owl Award for Best First Novel	Won	
2013	Big Maria	Anthony Award for Best Paperback Original	Won	
2015	Plaster City	Left Coast Crime Rose Award	Finalist	
2015	Plaster City	Spotted Owl Award for Best Novel	Won	
2016	"Feliz Navidead", in Thuglit Presents	Anthony Award for Best Short Story	Finalist	
2017	Floodgate	Lefty Award for Best Humorous Mystery	Finalist	
2017	"Gary’s Got A Boner", in Waiting to Be Forgotten	Anthony Award for Best Short Story	Finalist	

== Publications ==
=== Jimmy Veeder books ===
- Dove Season. Thomas & Mercer. 2011. ISBN 9781612180649.
- Plaster City. Thomas & Mercer. 2014. ISBN 9781477817582.
- Imperial Valley. Thomas & Mercer. 2017. ISBN 9781503941298.

=== Standalone books ===
- Big Maria. Thomas & Mercer. 2012. ISBN 9781612184395.
- Floodgate. Thomas & Mercer. 2016. ISBN 9781503950351.
- The Upper Hand. Thomas & Mercer. 2018. ISBN 9781503900738.
- The Southland. Polis Books. 2020. ISBN 9781947993969.
