= Panic (novel) =

2005 thriller novel by Jeff Abbott

- First edition cover
- Author: Jeff Abbott
- Genre: Thriller
- Publisher: E. P. Dutton
- Publication date: September 2005
- ISBN: 0-525-94904-6

Panic is a 2005 thriller novel by American author Jeff Abbott about an unsuspecting young documentary film maker, Evan, whose life is turned upside down when he realizes that his parents have been working as spies throughout their lives. One morning his mother phones him and asks him to come to her urgently, but when he arrives at her home she has just been murdered and he barely manages to escape with his life. Evan is suspected of having received from his mother a copy of a list of members and clients of a secret organisation called "The Deeps" and the chase is on. Evan must struggle through his mother's death and meets C.I.A. agents, cold-hearted killers, and double-crossers, and friends – trying to find his father, get his revenge on the people who murdered his mother, and uncover all the secrets about the lie he believed was his life. He also tries to save a lovely girl named Carrie whom he has recently met and fallen in love with, but doesn't know whose side she is on, "The Deeps" or the C.I.A.

Panic was to be made into a film in 2011, but no such film ever materialized.

== Critical reception ==
Panic was well received by critics, including a starred review from Booklist. Publishers Weekly said the novel is "extremely hard to put down" and RTÉ.ie described it as an "absorbing thriller" that is "a fast, furious and fun read". Oline Cogdill of the South Florida Sun-Sentinel said Abbott takes the novel "just to the boundaries of disbelief", but still manages to make it "credible" and "still a shocker".
