= Dandy Gilver =

- First appearance: After the Armistice Ball
- Created by: Catriona McPherson

In-universe information
- Gender: Female
- Occupation: Private investigator
- Nationality: Scottish

Dandy Gilver is the protagonist of a historical mystery series by Scottish author Catriona McPherson. The stories are set in Scotland in the interwar period, beginning shortly after World War I and extending into the mid-1930s.

== Overview ==
The novels feature dry humor and colorful characters in the cozy mystery tradition. The novels are well-researched and full of period details, and the books address the rapidly changing social order, economic challenges before and during the Great Depression in the United Kingdom, and ongoing class tensions. As of 2021, 15 books have been published in this series. Several books in the series have won awards, including the Agatha Award for Best Historical Novel.

Dandy (short for Dandelion) is an upper-class Englishwoman whose career as a private detective fills the void in her comfortable but unfulfilled life within a world of landownership and child-rearing for which she is temperamentally unsuited. Dandy is a first-person narrator. She is joined in her detecting activities by her friend Alec Osborne.

== Characters ==
The recurring characters age at a realistic rate as the series advances through time.

- Dandy Gilver, private detective and lady of the manor at Gilverton.
- Alec Osborne, an upper-class "eligible" bachelor who is partner in Dandy's detective business and a friend to Dandy and Hugh
- Hugh Gilver, Dandy's husband, who spends his time managing the farms and associated business on the Gilverton estate
- Grant, Dandy's aggressively fashion-conscious lady's maid, who occasionally takes part in Gilver & Osborne's adventures
- Donald, the Gilvers' elder son
- Teddy, the Gilvers' younger son
- Pallister, the Gilvers' rigidly conservative butler
- Bunty, Dandy's Dalmatian

== Books in the series ==
- After the Armistice Ball (2005) – a question of stolen jewelry in the early 1920s, when many upper-class families were struggling financially. Long-listed for the 2005 CWA Historical Dagger award
- The Burry Man's Day (2006) – an unexpected death during the Burry man summertime parade. Long-listed for the Theakston's Old Peculier Crime Novel of the Year Award
- Bury Her Deep (2007) – reports of a stranger attacking women
- The Winter Ground (2008) – featuring a traveling circus in their winter location
- (Dandy Gilver and) The Proper Treatment of Bloodstains (2009) – Dandy Gilver works undercover as a lady's maid during the 1926 United Kingdom general strike. Winner of the 2012 Macavity Awards for historical fiction
- (Dandy Gilver and) An Unsuitable Day for a Murder (2010) – a missing person case with rival department stores as the focus. Winner of the 2013 Agatha Awards for Best Historical Mystery and the 2013 Bruce Alexander Historical Mystery Award
- (Dandy Gilver and) A Bothersome Number of Corpses (2012) – an unhappy childhood friend is teaching at a remote boarding school for girls. Winner of the 2014 Bruce Alexander Award
- A Deadly Measure of Brimstone (2013) – set in Moffat, a spa town. Winner of the 2015 Bruce Alexander award and the Macavity Awards
- The Reek of Red Herrings (2014) – a grisly book featuring Doric language, Christmas, and wedding customs in a herring fishery. Finalist for Macavity Awards. Winner of the 2017 Bruce Alexander award and 2017 Agatha Award for best historical novel, and finalist for Macavity Awards
- Dandy Gilver and The Unpleasantness in the Ballroom (2015) – A debutante competes for a ballroom dancing prize
- Dandy Gilver and A Most Misleading Habit (2016) – featuring an insane asylum and a convent.
- Dandy Gilver and A Spot of Toil and Trouble (2017) – a castle becomes the setting for a 1934 production of Macbeth
- A Step So Grave (2018) – Dandy Gilver's son wants to marry a 30-year-old woman from Wester Ross.
- The Turning Tide (2020) – featuring a distressed ferrywoman on the Firth of Forth and rival watermills in the summer of 1936. Finalist for Agatha Award and Macavity Awards
- The Mirror Dance (2021) – featuring a Punch and Judy puppeteer and a copyright dispute

== Reception ==
The book series has been compared to the television shows Downton Abbey and Upstairs.
