= Murder on the Run =

1986 novel by Caroline Roe

- Author: Caroline Roe
- Language: English
- Genre: Mystery fiction, Crime fiction
- Publisher: Paperjacks
- Publication date: 1986
- Publication place: Canada
- ISBN: 0425189120
- OCLC: 905236727
- Followed by: Murder in Focus

Murder on the Run is a mystery fiction novel written by Canadian author Caroline Roe under the pen name Medora Sale. Her debut novel, it follows Detective Inspector John Sanders and his colleague Ed Dubinsky who investigate several cases of women being raped and beaten to death in the parks of Toronto. It won the Arthur Ellis Award for Best First Novel, which was awarded by the Crime Writers of Canada.

== Reception ==
Jerry Petryshyn of the Grande Prairie Daily Herald-Tribune called the novel a "worthy winner" of the Arthur Ellis Award and a "good premiere effort", opining that it is "well written for the most part with tight plot construction which keeps the action flowing." Joyce W. Milkie of The Times and Democrat called it a "tight, taut police-mystery novel" and wrote that Roe "plots beautifully, then makes the characters believable under unbelievable circumstances", praising the character Sanders. Robert McMillan of the Ottawa Citizen opined that Roe "mixes objective description and interior monologue in the manner of Virginia Woolf and James Joyce".
