= Alison Gaylin =

American author

Alison L. Gaylin is an American author of mystery and thriller novels. She has won a Shamus Award (2013) and Edgar Award (2019), and has been a finalist for many other awards.

Gaylin received degrees from Northwestern University and the Columbia University Graduate School of Journalism.

She lives in Woodstock, New York with her husband and daughter.

== Awards ==
CrimeReads included The Collective on their "Best Crime Novels of 2021" list.

Awards for Gaylin's writing
Year	Title	Award	Result
2006	Hide Your Eyes	Edgar Allan Poe Award for Best First Novel	Finalist
2013	And She Was	Anthony Award for Best Paperback Original	Finalist
2013	And She Was	International Thriller Writers Award for Best Paperback	Finalist
2013	And She Was	Shamus Award for Best Original Paperback P.I. Novel	Winner
2013	Into the Dark	Shamus Award for Best Original Paperback P.I. Novel	Finalist
2015	Stay With Me	Anthony Award for Best Paperback Original	Finalist
2015	Stay With Me	Edgar Allan Poe Award for Best Paperback Original	Finalist
2017	What Remains of Me	Edgar Allan Poe Award for Best Novel	Finalist
2019	If I Die Tonight	Anthony Award for Best Paperback Original	Finalist
2019	If I Die Tonight	Edgar Allan Poe Award for Best Paperback Original	Winner
2019	If I Die Tonight	Macavity Award for Best Mystery Novel	Finalist
2019	If I Die Tonight	Staunch Book Prize	Shortlist
2020	Never Look Back	International Thriller Writers Award for Best Paperback	Finalist
2021	The Collective	Anthony Award for Best Novel	Finalist
2021	The Collective	Los Angeles Times Book Prize for Mystery/Thriller	Finalist

== Publications ==
=== Novels ===
==== Brenna Spector books ====
1. And She Was. HarperCollins. 2012. ISBN 9780061878206.
2. Into the Dark. HarperCollins. 2013. ISBN 9780061878251.
3. Stay With Me. HarperCollins. 2014. ISBN 9780061878268.

==== Samantha Leiffer Mystery books ====
1. Hide Your Eyes. Signet Books. 2005. ISBN 9780451214485.
2. You Kill Me. Signet Books. 2005. ISBN 9780451217226.

==== Robert B. Parker's Sunny Randall books ====
The Sunny Randall character was originally created by Robert B. Parker.

- Robert B. Parker's Bad Influence. G. P. Putnam's Sons. 2023. ISBN 9780593540527.
- Robert B. Parker's Buzzkill. G. P. Putnam's Sons. 2024. ISBN 9780593715659.

==== Standalone novels ====
- Trashed. NAL Hardcover. 2007. ISBN 9780451221131.
- Heartless. Obsidian. 2008. ISBN 9780451224972.
- Reality Ends Here. Pocket Star. 2013. ISBN 9781476727592.
- What Remains of Me. William Morrow. 2016. ISBN 9780062369857.
- If I Die Tonight. William Morrow. 2018. ISBN 9780062641090.
- Never Look Back. William Morrow. 2019. ISBN 9780062884350.
- The Collective. William Morrow. 2021. ISBN 9780063083158.

=== Novellas ===
- The Gift. Amazon Original Stories. 2020. ISBN 9781542015295.
