= Straw Men (novel) =

Crime novel by Martin J. Smith

- First edition
- Author: Martin J. Smith
- Language: English
- Genre: Novel
- Publisher: Berkeley Publishing Group
- Publication date: 2001
- Publication place: USA
- Media type: Print (Paperback)
- Pages: 321
- ISBN: 0-515-12950-X
- OCLC: 45761674
- Preceded by: Shadow Image

Straw Men is a crime novel by the American writer Martin J. Smith set in Pittsburgh, Pennsylvania.

It tells the story of a madman known as the Scarecrow, who has served in prison eight years convicted of a vicious attack that left a rookie policewoman near death and unable to remember her past. When DNA evidence surfaces that frees him, Teresa Harnett must face the possibility that her flawed memory put the wrong man behind bars. Only Harnett's nemesis, psychologist Jim Christensen, can help to solve the case.

== Reception ==
Bill Spurgeon of The Star Press called it "a real page-turner". Barbara Vancheri of the Pittsburgh Post-Gazette opined that Smith has the "ability to turn a descriptive phrase, to nail characters with telling details and to provide enough clues to gently guide perceptive readers to satisfying conclusions." Publishers Weekly wrote that Smith "fails to create characters that emerge as real people, however, and readers will come away thinking they've read similar, albeit stronger, novels."

== Sources ==
Contemporary Authors Online. The Gale Group, 2006. PEN (Permanent Entry Number): 0000132047.
