= P. J. Parrish =

American novelist duo's pseudonym

P. J. Parrish is a pseudonym used by Detroit-born sisters Kelly Nichols (née Montee) and Kristy Montee in writing their critically acclaimed and commercially successful Louis Kincaid series of mystery thriller novels, which have won an International Thriller Writers Award, a Shamus Award from the Private Eye Writers of America, an Anthony Award, and a finalist for the Edgar Award, given by the Mystery Writers of America.

== Biographies ==
Kelly Nichols attended Northern Michigan University then moved to Arizona before spending 15 years in the gaming industry in Las Vegas then as HR manager in a Philadelphia casino. She had struggled with a mystery novel manuscript before collaborating with her sister.

Kristy Montee earned a degree in education from Eastern Michigan University but then worked as a reporter in Michigan and then in Fort Lauderdale, Florida where she worked on the Sun-Sentinel rising to assistant managing editor. She left to concentrate on fiction writing and produced four romantic novels but became bored with this genre and so joined forces with her sister in mystery writing.

Montee lives in Fort Lauderdale and Nichols resides in Elk Rapids, Michigan

== Writing ==
Their first series features biracial Michigan-based police detective Louis Kincaid and is set in the 1980s. In the first novel he returns to his hometown in Mississippi for a temporary reassignment due to his mother's terminal illness. On investigating a lynching he faces racism within the force. Subsequent novels are set both back in Michigan and then in Florida where he becomes a private investigator. Female detective Joe Frye makes an appearance in A Killing Rain and has since played a larger role in the series, according to the authors website "She stayed in the book to help him solve the crime. And then, well, she and Louis kind of fell hard for each other. And we fell for her. Our plan is to alternate the characters or have them appear in books together"

== Bibliography ==
=== Louis Kincaid series ===
- Dark of the Moon (1999)
- Dead of Winter (2001) - Edgar Award finalist for Best Paperback Original
- Paint It Black (2002)
- Thicker Than Water (2003)
- Island of Bones (2004)
- A Killing Rain (2005)
- Unquiet Grave (2006) - International Thriller Writers Award for Best Paperback Original
- A Thousand Bones (2007)
- South of Hell (2008)
- The Little Death (2009)
- Claw Back (2012, novella)
- Heart of Ice (2013)
- The Damage Done (2018)

=== Other novels ===
- The Killing Song (2011)
- She's Not There (2015)
