= A Thousand Bones =

2007 novel by P. J. Parrish

- Author: P. J. Parrish
- Genre: Mystery fiction, Thriller, Suspense, Crime
- Published: 2007
- Publisher: Pocket Books
- Pages: 470
- Awards: Anthony Award for Best Paperback Original (2008)
- ISBN: 978-1-416-52587-5
- Website: A Thousand Bones

A Thousand Bones is a book written by P. J. Parrish and published by Pocket Books on 1 January 2007, which later went on to win the Anthony Award for Best Paperback Original in 2008.
