= Catriona McPherson =

Scottish writer

Catriona McPherson (born 22 October 1965, in South Queensferry) is a Scottish writer. She is most notable for her Dandy Gilver series. Her novels have won an Agatha Award, two Anthony Awards, six Lefty Awards, and two Macavity Awards.

McPherson received a Master of Arts degree in English Language and Linguistics and Doctor of Philosophy in Linguistics, both from the University of Edinburgh. Before committing herself to writing full-time in 2005, McPherson worked in banking, libraries, and academia.

She remained in Scotland until 2010 when she moved to California.

== Awards and honors ==
Awards for McPherson's Writing
Year	Title	Award	Category	Result	Ref
2005	After the Armistice Ball	Ellis Peters Historical Award	—	Shortlisted	
2012	Dandy Gilver and the Proper Treatment of Bloodstains	Macavity Award	Sue Feder Memorial Award	Won	
2012	Dandy Gilver and an Unsuitable Day for Murder	Agatha Award	Historical Novel	Won	
2013	Dandy Gilver and an Unsuitable Day for Murder	Lefty Award	Bruce Alexander Memorial Mystery Award	Won	
2014	As She Left It	Anthony Award	Paperback Original	Won	
2014	As She Left It	Lefty Award	The Calamari Award	Shortlisted	
2014	Dandy Gilver and a Bothersome Number of Corpses	Lefty Award	Bruce Alexander Memorial Mystery Award	Won	
2014	Dandy Gilver and a Bothersome Number of Corpses	Macavity Award	Sue Feder Memorial Award	Shortlisted	
2015	The Child Garden	Agatha Award	Contemporary Novel	Shortlisted	
2015	Dandy Gilver and a Deadly Measure of Brimstone	Macavity Award	Sue Feder Memorial Award	Won	
2015	Dandy Gilver and a Deadly Measure of Brimstone	Lefty Award	Bruce Alexander Memorial Mystery Award	Won	
2015	The Day She Died	Anthony Award	Paperback Original	Won	
2015	The Day She Died	Edgar Award	Paperback Original	Shortlisted	
2015	The Day She Died	Macavity Award	Mystery Novel	Shortlisted	
2015	The Day She Died	San Francisco Book Festival Award	General Fiction	Honorable Mention	
2016	The Child Garden	Macavity Award	Mystery Novel	Shortlisted	
2016	The Child Garden	Mary Higgins Clark Award	—	Shortlisted	
2016	Quiet Neighbors	Agatha Award	Contemporary Novel	Shortlisted	
2017	Quiet Neighbors	Mary Higgins Clark Award	—	Won	
2017	Dandy Gilver and the Reek of Red Herrings	Lefty Award	Historical Mystery Novel	Shortlisted	
2017	Dandy Gilver and the Reek of Red Herrings	Macavity Award	Sue Feder Memorial Award	Shortlisted	
2019	Scot Free	Lefty Award	Humorous Mystery Novel	Won	
2020	Scot & Soda	Anthony Award	Paperback Original	Shortlisted	
2020	Scot & Soda	Lefty Award	Humorous Mystery Novel	Won	
2020	Strangers at the Gate	Mary Higgins Clark Award	—	Shortlisted	
2020	The Turning Tide	Agatha Award	Historical Novel	Shortlisted	
2021	The Turning Tide	Lefty Award	Historical Mystery Novel	Won	
2021	The Turning Tide	Macavity Award	Sue Feder Memorial Award	Shortlisted	
2022	The Mirror Dance	Lefty Award	Historical Mystery Novel	Shortlisted	

== Publications ==
=== Standalone novels ===
- As She Left It (2013)
- The Day She Died (2014)
- The Child Garden (2015)
- Come to Harm (2015)
- Quiet Neighbors (2016)
- House. Tree. Person. (2017)
- Go to My Grave (2018)
- Strangers at the Gate (2019)
- A Gingerbread House (2021)
- Quiet Neighbours (2021)
- In Place of Fear (2022)
- Deep Beneath Us (2024)

=== Dandy Gilver series ===
1. After the Armistice Ball (2005)
2. The Burry Man's Day (2006)
3. Bury Her Deep (2007)
4. The Winter Ground (2008)
5. The Proper Treatment of Bloodstains (2011)
6. An Unsuitable Day for a Murder (2012)
7. A Bothersome Number of Corpses (2012)
8. A Deadly Measure of Brimstone (2013)
9. The Reek of Red Herrings (2014)
10. The Unpleasantness in the Ballroom (2015)
11. A Most Misleading Habit (2016)
12. A Spot of Toil and Trouble (2017)
13. A Step So Grave (2018)
14. The Turning Tide (2019)
15. The Mirror Dance (2021)
16. The Witching Hour (2024)

=== Last Ditch Mystery series ===
1. Scot Free (2018)
2. Scot & Soda (2019)
3. Scot on the Rocks (2021)
4. Scot Mist (2022)
5. Scot in a Trap (2022)
6. Hop Scot (2023)
