= Robin Burcell =

Author and forensic artist

- Born: 1959 (age 65–66)
- Occupation: Author; forensic artist
- Notable awards: Barry Award for Best Paperback Original (2000); Anthony Award for Best Paperback Original (2003, 2004)

Website
- robinburcell.com

Robin Burcell (born 1959) is an author and forensic artist. She trained with the Federal Bureau of Investigation and "worked in law enforcement for over two decades as a police officer, detective, and hostage negotiator".

== Awards and honors ==
Awards for Burcell's writing
Year	Title	Award	Result	Ref.
2000	Every Move She Makes	Anthony Award for Best Paperback Original	Finalist	
2000	Every Move She Makes	Barry Award for Best Paperback Original	Winner	
2003	Fatal Truth	Anthony Award for Best Paperback Original	Winner	
2003	Fatal Truth	Barry Award for Best Paperback Original	Finalist	
2004	Deadly Legacy	Anthony Award for Best Paperback Original	Winner	
2005	Cold Case	Anthony Award for Best Paperback Original	Finalist	
2005	Cold Case	Macavity Award for Best Mystery Novel	Finalist	

== Publications ==
=== Kate Gillespie books ===
1. Every Move She Makes. HarperTorch. 1999. ISBN 9780061014321.
2. Fatal Truth. Avon Books. 2002. ISBN 9780061061233.
3. Deadly Legacy. William Morrow Paperbacks. 2003. ISBN 9780061057878.
4. Cold Case. Avon Books. 2004. ISBN 9780061053771.

=== Sydney Fitzpatrick books ===
1. Face of a Killer. William Morrow Paperbacks. 2008. ISBN 9780061122309.
2. The Bone Chamber. HarperCollins. 2009. ISBN 9780061122293.
3. The Dark Hour. HarperCollins. 2012. ISBN 9780062133472.
4. The Black List. HarperCollins. 2012. ISBN 9780062133540.
  - The Last Second: A Novella. Witness Impulse. 2013.
5. The Kill Order. HarperCollins. 2013. ISBN 9780062273710.

=== Fargo Adventures books ===
The Fargo Adventures books were co-written with Clive Cussler. Other books in the series have other co-authors with Cussler remaining the primary author.

8. Pirate. G.P. Putnam's Sons. 2016. ISBN 9780399183973.
9. The Romanov Ransom. G.P. Putnam's Sons. 2017. ISBN 9780399575549.
10. The Gray Ghost. G.P. Putnam's Sons. 2018. ISBN 9780735218734.
11. The Oracle. G.P. Putnam's Sons. 2019. ISBN 9780525539612.
12. Wrath of Poseidon. G.P. Putnam's Sons. 2020. ISBN 9780593087886.
13. The Serpent's Eye. G.P. Putnam's Sons. 2024. ISBN 9780593419618.

=== Standalone novels ===
- The Last Good Place. Brash Books. 2015. ISBN 9781941298855.
