= Ashes and Bones =

2008 novel by Dana Cameron

- Author: Dana Cameron
- Genre: Mystery fiction, suspense, thriller
- Published: 2006
- Publisher: Avon Books
- Pages: 304
- Awards: Anthony Award for Best Paperback Original (2007)
- ISBN: 978-0-060-55467-5
- Website: Ashes and Bones

Ashes and Bones is a book written by American author Dana Cameron and published by Avon Books on 25 July 2006. It later went on to win the Anthony Award for Best Paperback Original in 2007. It is the 6th one in the series.

== Plot ==
Emma Fielding confronts a man who should be dead.Tony Markham took the gold artifacts and sailed off into a hurricane. Everyone believes that he is dead, but he is haunting Emma's waking hours. Just when Emma has everything she has worked for all of her adult life a nightmare become real turning her hard won achievements into ashes. No one will believe her until things start getting rough. Plenty of tension building, but it borders on hysteria.
