= P. M. Carlson =

American writer

- Born: Patricia McElroy; February 3, 1940 (age 86); Guatemala City, Guatemala
- Education: Cornell University
- Occupation: Writer
- Writing career
- Genre: Mystery fiction

Patricia McElroy Carlson (born February 3, 1940) is an American writer of mystery fiction.

== Life and career ==
Born Patricia McElroy in Guatemala City, where her radio engineer father had moved to find work during the Great Depression, Carlson earned a bachelor's degree, master's degree, and Ph.D. from Cornell University, where she also taught psychology and human development. From 1975 until 1978 she chaired Ithaca, New York's Environmental Commission; she was also on the boards of directors of Bloomington Restorations, Inc., and Historic Ithaca. Her mysteries often feature feminist themes. During her career she has created three detectives, actress Bridget Mooney, graduate student (later statistician) Maggie Ryan, and Deputy Sheriff Marty Hopkins. The Mooney stories are set in the late nineteenth century, while the Maggie Ryan novels are set in the 1960s and 1970s; both series are informed by the periods of their setting. Many of Carlson's works feature aspects of her background as well. Carlson has also written on the subject of children's linguistic development. Her novels have at various times been nominated for the Edgar, Macavity, and Anthony Awards, and her short fiction has been nominated for the Agatha Award. Formerly a resident of southern Indiana, she later moved to New York City.

Carlson is a past president of Sisters in Crime.

== Works ==
List from:

=== Maggie Ryan novels ===
- Audition for Murder (1985)
- Murder Is Academic (1985)
- Murder Is Pathological (1986)
- Murder Unrenovated (1987)
- Rehearsal for Murder (1988)
- Murder in the Dog Days (1990)
- Murder Misread (1990)
- Bad Blood (1991)

=== Marty Hopkins novels ===
- Gravestone (1993)
- Bloodstream (1995)
- Deathwind (2004)
- Crossfire (2006)

=== Bridget Mooney books ===
- Renowned Be the Grave (collected stories) (1998)
