= On Conan Doyle; or, The Whole Art of Storytelling =

Book by Michael Dirda

- Author: Michael Dirda
- Subject: Arthur Conan Doyle
- Published: 2011
- Publisher: Princeton University Press
- Media type: Print
- Pages: 224
- Awards: Edgar Award for Best Critical / Biographical Works (2012)
- ISBN: 978-1-400-83949-0
- Website: On Conan Doyle

On Conan Doyle; or, The Whole Art of Storytelling is a 2011 book about Arthur Conan Doyle by Michael Dirda. Published by Princeton University Press on 10 October 2011, it later went on to win the Edgar Award for Best Critical / Biographical Work in 2012.
