= Kelly J. Ford =

American writer

- Born: Fort Smith, Arkansas, United States
- Education: University of Central Arkansas
- Writing career
- Genres: Thriller; Crime fiction
- Website: kellyjford.com

Kelly J. Ford is an American writer. She is the author of Cottonmouths, Real Bad Things, and The Hunt.

== Career ==
Ford's debut novel, Cottonmouths was published in 2017 and was named a best book of 2017 by the Los Angeles Review. She had differing opinions on her initial draft of her second novel, Real Bad Things, from her then agent. She submitted the draft to Chris Bucci with Aevitas Creative and the book was later published with Thomas & Mercer in 2022. Real Bad Things was nominated for an Anthony Award. Ford's third novel, The Hunt, was published by Thomas & Mercer in 2023.

== Personal life ==
Ford is originally from Fort Smith, Arkansas, and attended the University of Central Arkansas. She left Arkansas when she was 22.

== Books ==
- Cottonmouths (Skyhorse Publishing, 2017)
- Real Bad Things (Thomas & Mercer, 2022)
- The Hunt (Thomas & Mercer, 2023)
