= Caroline Roe =

Canadian novelist (1943-2021)

Caroline Medora Sale Roe (1943 – November 7, 2021) was a Canadian novelist who wrote detective novels as Medora Sale and historical mystery novels as Caroline Roe.

Caroline Medora Sale was born in Windsor, Ontario. She received a BA from the University of Toronto, and a PhD in Medieval Studies from the same university. Her PhD research involved religious diversity in the Medieval Era. Before becoming a full-time writer, she taught at Branksome Hall and also worked in advertising and as a typist, translator, and caseworker. She married the medievalist Harry Roe in 1970; they had one daughter, Anne.

Her books as Medora Sale are The Spider Bites (2010), Murder on the Run (1985), Murder in Focus (1989), Murder in a Good Cause (1990), Sleep of the Innocent (1991), Pursued by Shadows (1992), and A Short Cut to Santa Fe (1994). They are police procedural novels set around Toronto and featuring the characters of John Sanders, a homicide detective, and Harriet Jeffries, an architectural photographer.

Her books as Caroline Roe are Remedy for Treason (1998), Cure for a Charlatan (1999), An Antidote for Avarice (1999), Solace for a Sinner (2000), A Potion for a Widow (2001), A Draught for a Dead Man (2002), A Poultice for a Healer (2003), and Consolation for an Exile (2004). These historical mystery novels draw upon Roe's PhD research, and feature a 14th-century Jewish doctor who is physician to the Bishop of Girona.

Roe was president of Crime Writers of Canada and of the international board of Sisters in Crime. Roe won the Arthur Ellis Award for best first novel in 1985 (for Murder on the Run), and a Barry Award in 1999 (for An Antidote for Avarice).

== Biblio ==
=== Works as Medora Sale (Detective Novels) ===
- Murder on the Run (1985)
- Murder in Focus (1989)
- Murder in a Good Cause (1990)
- Sleep of the Innocent (1991)
- Pursued by Shadows (1992)
- A Short Cut to Santa Fe (1994)
- The Spider Bites (2010)

=== Works as Caroline Roe (Historical Mystery Novels) ===
- Remedy for Treason (1998)
- Cure for a Charlatan (1999)
- An Antidote for Avarice (1999)
- Solace for a Sinner (2000)
- A Potion for a Widow (2001)
- A Draught for a Dead Man (2002)
- A Poultice for a Healer (2003)
- Consolation for an Exile (2004)
