= Chris Holm (author) =

American author

Chris Holm is an American author. His novel The Killing Kind won the Anthony Award for Best Novel in 2016.

Holm was born in Syracuse, New York. Before committing himself to writing, Holm worked as a molecular biologist, which inspired his 2022 novel Child Zero. He lives in Portland, Maine with his wife, Katrina Niidas Holm.

== Awards and honors ==
Awards for Holm's writing
Year	Title	Award	Result	Ref.
2014	The Big Reap	Anthony Award for Best Paperback Original	Finalist	
2016	The Killing Kind	Anthony Award for Best Novel	Winner	
2016	The Killing Kind	Barry Award for Best Thriller	Finalist	
2016	The Killing Kind	Lefty Award for Best World Mystery	Finalist	
2016	The Killing Kind	Macavity Award for Best First Mystery	Finalist	
2017	Red Right Hand	Anthony Award for Best Novel	Finalist	

== Publications ==
=== Short stories ===
- Coben, Harlan; Otto, Penzler, eds. (2015). "The Hitter". The Best American Mystery Stories 2011. Houghton Mifflin Harcourt. ISBN 978-0-547-55396-2.

=== Michael Hendricks books ===
- The Killing Kind. Mulholland Books. 2015. ISBN 978-0-316-25953-8.
- Red Right Hand. Mulholland Books. 2016. ISBN 978-0-316-25956-9.

=== Sam Thornton books ===
- Dead Harvest. Angry Robot. 2012. ISBN 978-0-85766-218-7.
- The Wrong Goodbye. Angry Robot. 2012. ISBN 9780857662217.
- The Big Reap. Angry Robot. 2013. ISBN 9780857663429.

=== Standalone novels ===
- Child Zero. Mulholland Books. 2022. ISBN 978-0-316-29512-3.
