= David Handler =

American composer, violinist/violist and entrepreneur

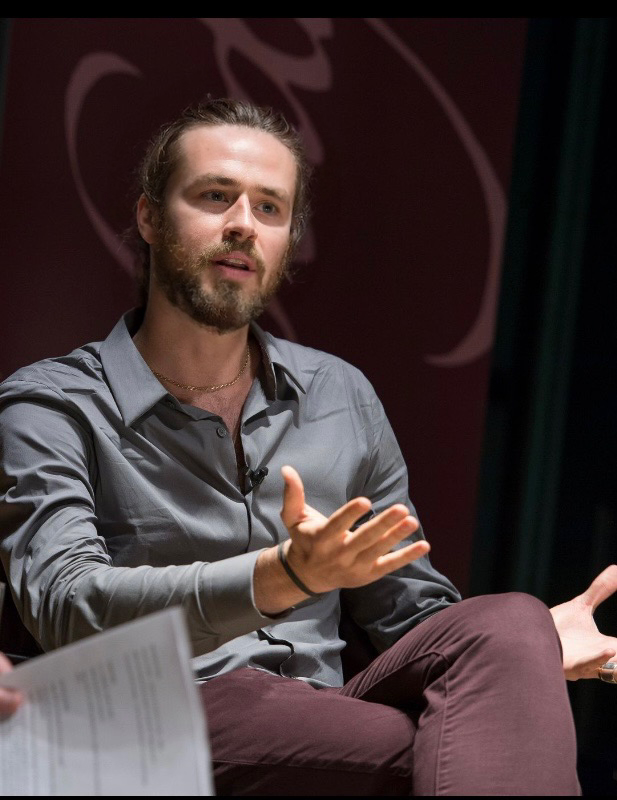
- Handler at the Peabody Conservatory at Johns Hopkins University, 2016

Background information
- Born: July 24, 1980 (age 45); Manhattan, New York, U.S.
- Occupations: Composer, violinist, entrepreneur
- Works: Life Like Violence
- Years active: 2008–present
- Label: Cantaloupe Music
- Website: www.david-handler.com www.lpr.com

David Handler (born July 24, 1980) is an American composer, violinist/violist and entrepreneur. His acoustic and electronic compositions have been described by The New York Times as “eerie” and “superbly wrought”, “exploring polarities of light and dark, the sacred and the profane.” He is the owner and co-founder of the music venue Le Poisson Rouge, and the founder and co-artistic director of Ensemble LPR, for which he was described as “the Ian Schrager of the music scene” by The New Yorker.

== Early life and education ==
David Handler was born in 1980, in Manhattan, New York, and raised in Fort Lee, New Jersey. His parents are Joan Cusack Handler, a poet and publisher, and Alan Handler, a psychologist. At the age of three, Handler began studying violin, and at seven, he expanded his musical interests to include drums, rock, jazz and folk music. His early attempts at composing followed soon after. His formative years included studies at the JCC Thurnauer School of Music. Handler attended the Professional Children’s School (PCS) in Manhattan and earned a bachelor's degree from the Manhattan School of Music, studying violin performance, viola performance, composition and conducting.

== Career ==
Handler's compositions are known for incorporating contrasting themes and combining acoustic and electronic elements. His works have been performed at venues including Lincoln Center, the Brooklyn Academy of Music (BAM), the Sydney Opera House, the Philharmonie de Paris, and Barbican Hall. Notable compositions include Solstice, written for divided string orchestra performed by Ensemble LPR at Central Park’s Naumburg Bandshell in 2015, and an orchestral arrangement of Riceboy Sleeps by Jónsi and Alex Somers, premiered at Lincoln Center's White Light Festival in 2010. Handler has collaborated with artists such as Alex Somers, Jónsi of Sigur Rós, Clap Your Hands Say Yeah, and composers Max Richter and Jonny Greenwood.

In 2008, Handler co-founded Le Poisson Rouge (LPR) in New York City’s Greenwich Village, on the former site of The Village Gate. The venue has hosted artists including Thom Yorke, Philip Glass, Paul Simon, Yo-Yo Ma, Lou Reed, and Lady Gaga. The New York Times described LPR as a "forward-thinking venue that seeks to showcase disparate musical styles under one roof," and The Los Angeles Times called it a "musical marvel."

Five years after establishing Le Poisson Rouge, Handler founded Ensemble LPR, a contemporary music ensemble based at the venue. The ensemble has collaborated with musicians such as Lara St. John, Simone Dinnerstein, Jennifer Koh, Fred Sherry, Ursula Oppens, Daniel Hope, André de Ridder, Christopher Rountree, Max Richter, Jonny Greenwood, David Longstreth, Bryce Dessner, Mica Levi, John Lurie, and San Fermin. Ensemble LPR has performed at venues including Central Park's Naumburg Bandshell, Central Park Summerstage, BRIC House Ballroom, and House of Yes. In 2015, the ensemble recorded Follow, Poet for Deutsche Grammophon, featuring music by Mohammed Fairouz.

In 2019, Handler reduced his involvement in Le Poisson Rouge's daily operations to focus on composition and performance projects, including orchestrating Riceboy Sleeps for an internationally touring production. He created and hosts the online radio show "Music to Live By. " Handler has given lectures at institutions such as New York University, the University of Missouri–Kansas City, Syracuse University, Hunter College, The New School, and the Manhattan School of Music. He serves on advisory boards for the David Lynch Foundation, CavanKerry Press, the Hunter College Department of Music, and the Mount Sinai Department of Psychiatry. Handler practices Transcendental Meditation. The album Life Like Violence, Handler's first, was released on Cantaloupe Music in May 2025. The album was featured on NPR's All Songs Considered that month.

== Selected works ==
Handler's compositions span large orchestra, chamber orchestra, chamber ensembles, solo instruments, and electronic/electro-acoustic pieces.

Category	Title	Duration
Large Orchestra	The Diving Bell	20'
Large Orchestra	Riceboy Sleeps, Orchestrated	50'
Chamber Orchestra	Fanfare & Fugue (for a Fish)	12'
Chamber Orchestra	Solstice	13'
Chamber	Ever After	5'
Chamber	Impressions of Blue in Green	12'
Chamber	Celtic Verses	22'
Chamber	Liadan's Lament	9'
Chamber	Rhapsody	7'
Chamber	Sunbled Sky	4'
Chamber	Clap Your Hands Say Yeah Arrangements	35'
Chamber	John Lurie Arrangements	15'
Chamber	Bolero Arrangement	18'
Solo	Contrasts	8'
Solo	Boxeo	9'
Electronic/Electro-acoustic	Lullaby for Piano & Electronics	4'40"
Electronic/Electro-acoustic	Life Like Violence circa 2003, or: Untitled Caprice	5'25"
Electronic/Electro-acoustic	Dialogue for Guitar & Electronics	7'
