= José Latour =

Cuban crime fiction writer (born 1940)

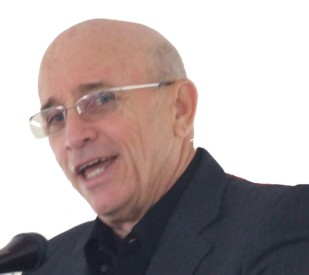
Latour in 2007.

José Latour (born April 24, 1940, in Havana, Cuba) is a Cuban crime fiction writer.

His first three novels (Preludio a la Noche, Medianoche Enemiga and Fauna Noctura), set in pre-revolutionary Havana, were published in 1982, 1986 and 1989. The fourth (Choque de Leyendas), was released in 1998.

In 1994 Latour submitted his new book The Fool to his Cuban publisher. Based on a real-life case of corruption in the ministries of the Interior and the Armed Forces, the book was considered counterrevolutionary and its author labeled an "enemy of the people." Certain that he would never be published in Cuba again as long as all publishing houses were state-owned, Latour took a shot at writing in English.

His first novel in that language, Outcast, was published in the U.S., Japan, five Western European countries and Brazil. It got flattering reviews and was nominated for an Edgar. Since then, he has penned Havana Best Friends (2002), Havana World Series (2003), Comrades in Miami (2005) and The Young Englishman (2006, still unpublished). His sole non-fiction book is Postcommunist CUBA Poscomunista, a bilingual essay.

== Personal ==
Seeking creative freedom and fearing dictatorial repression, the author and his family moved to Spain in August 2002 and to Canada in September 2004; as of 2014, they reside in Toronto.
