= Michael Dirda =

American literary critic (born 1948)

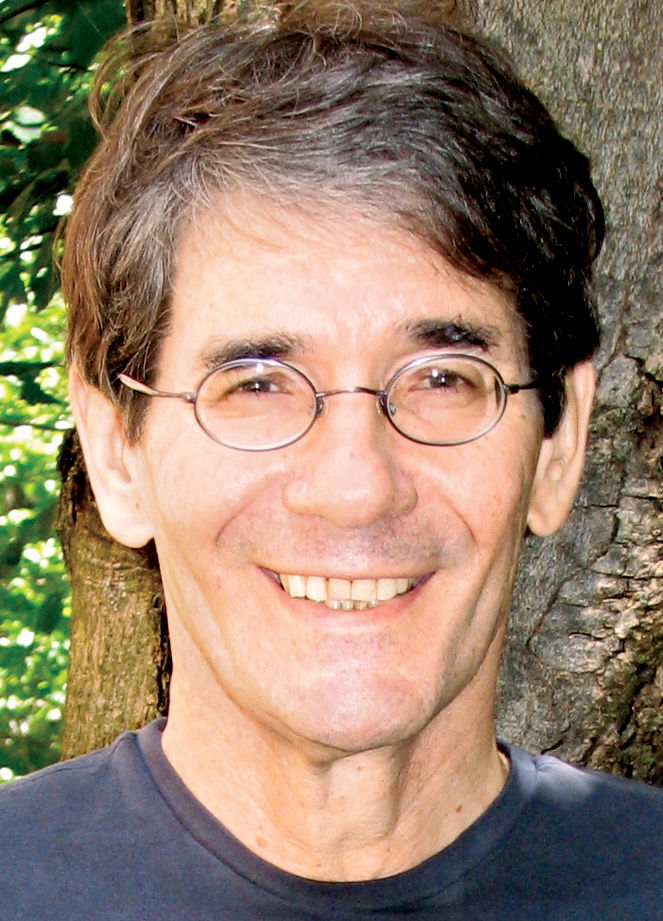
- Dirda in 2009
- Born: 1948 (age 77–78)
- Education: Oberlin College (BA); Cornell University (MA, PhD)
- Occupation: Book critic

Michael Dirda (born 1948) is an American book critic who worked at The Washington Post from 1978 to 2026. He has been a Fulbright Fellow and won a Pulitzer Prize in 1993.

== Career ==
Having studied at Oberlin College for his undergraduate degree in 1970, Dirda earned an M.A. in 1974 and a Ph.D. in 1977 from Cornell University in comparative literature. In 1978 Dirda started writing for the "Book World" section of The Washington Post; in 1993 he won the Pulitzer Prize for his criticism. He was a weekly book columnist for the Post.

In 2002, Dirda was invested as a member of The Baker Street Irregulars.

In 2026, Dirda was laid off by The Washington Post when it reduced its staff by one-third and eliminated the newspaper's books and sports sections.

== Works ==
Two collections of Dirda's literary journalism have been published:

- Readings: Essays and Literary Entertainments (Bloomington: Indiana University Press, 2000) ISBN 0-253-33824-7
- Bound to Please (New York: W. W. Norton, 2005) ISBN 0-393-05757-7

He has also written:

- An Open Book: Coming of Age in the Heartland (New York: W. W. Norton, 2003) ISBN 0-393-05756-9 (autobiography)
- Book by Book: Notes on Reading and Life (New York: Henry Holt, 2005) ISBN 0-8050-7877-0
- Classics for Pleasure (Orlando: Harcourt, 2007) ISBN 0-15-101251-2
- On Conan Doyle; or, The Whole Art of Storytelling (Princeton: Princeton University Press, 2011) ISBN 0-691-15135-0
- Browsings: A Year of Reading, Collecting, and Living with Books (New York: Pegasus, 2015) ISBN 978-1-60598-844-3
- The Great Age of Storytelling: The Glory Days of Adventurers and Rogues, Time Travelers and Great Detectives (Pegasus Books, 2026) ISBN 979-8897106318

On Conan Doyle was awarded the 2012 Edgar Award in the Best Critical/Biographical category. (Reviewer Darrell Schweitzer lauds the book in The New York Review of Science Fiction.)

== Family ==
Dirda lives in Silver Spring, Maryland, with his wife, Marian Peck Dirda, a prints and drawings conservator at the National Gallery of Art. They have three sons: Christopher (b. 1984), Michael (b. 1987), and Nathaniel (b. 1990).

== See also ==
- Ron Charles
- Jonathan Yardley
