= As She Left It =

2013 novel by Catriona McPherson

- First edition
- Author: Catriona McPherson
- Genre: Mystery fiction, Thriller, Crime
- Published: 2013
- Publisher: Midnight Ink Books
- Pages: 343
- Awards: Anthony Award for Best Paperback Original (2014)
- ISBN: 978-0-738-73677-8
- Website: As She Left It

As She Left It is a novel written by Scottish author Catriona McPherson and published by Midnight Ink Books on 8 June 2013, which later went on to win the Anthony Award for Best Paperback Original in 2014.
