= Jeff Abbott =

US suspense novelist (born 1963)

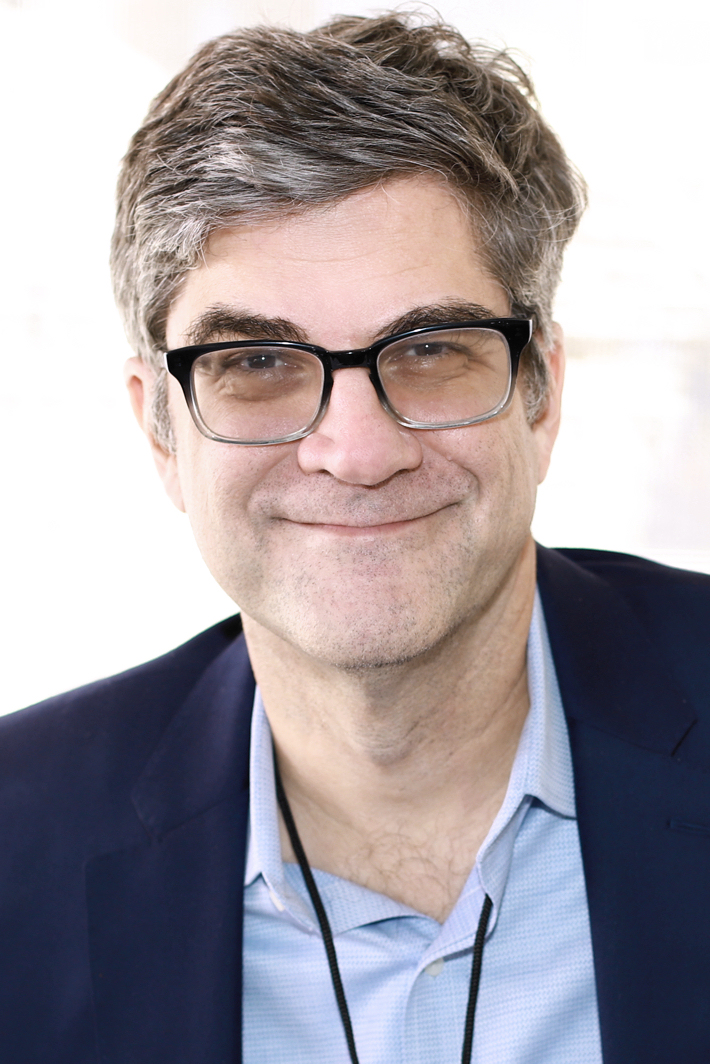
- Jeff Abbott at the 2022 Texas Book Festival.
- Born: 1963 (age 62–63)
- Occupation: Novelist
- Writing career
- Language: English
- Genres: Suspense, Detective fiction, Thriller fiction

Jeff Abbott (born 1963) is an American author of mysteries and thrillers. He has degrees in History and English from Rice University. He lives in Austin, Texas. Before writing full-time, he was a creative director at an advertising agency. His early novels were traditional detective fiction, but in recent years he has turned to writing thriller fiction. A theme of his work is the idea of ordinary people caught up in extraordinary danger and fighting to return to their normal lives. His novels are published in several countries and have also been bestsellers in the United Kingdom, Australia, Ireland, Germany, France and Portugal. He is also Creative Director at Springbox, a Prophet company.

== Bibliography ==
=== The Jordan Poteet mysteries ===
These novels are more traditional mysteries, centering on Poteet's eccentric family in a small Texas town.

1. Do Unto Others (Oct 1994) winner of the Agatha Award (given by Malice Domestic) and the Macavity Award (given by Mystery Readers International) for Best First Novel, nominated for the Dilys Award given by the Independent Mystery Booksellers Associations.
2. The Only Good Yankee (Apr 1995)–nominated for the Writers' League of Texas Violet Crown Award
3. Promises of Home (Jan 1996)
4. Distant Blood (Sep 1996)

=== The Whit Mosley series ===
Mosley is a Texas judge and coroner who partners with investigator Claudia Salazar in a Gulf Coast county. These books are darker and more thriller-oriented than the Poteet novels.

1. A Kiss Gone Bad (Oct 2001)–nominated for the Anthony Award at Bouchercon XXXIII in the "Best paperback original" category.
2. Black Jack Point (Sep 2002)—nominated for the Edgar Award (given by Mystery Writers of America),; the Anthony Award for "Best paperback original"; and also for the Barry Award.
3. Cut and Run (Nov 2003)—nominated for the Edgar Award),

=== The Sam Capra Series ===
Capra is a brilliant CIA agent who is set up and loses everything that matters to him. He then uses his skills to help the helpless, protect the innocent and track down those who took his family from him.

#	Title	Date Published	Comments
1	Adrenaline	Jan 2010	
1.5	Sam Capra's Last Chance	May 2012	e-book short story
2	The Last Minute	July 2012	
3	Downfall	July 2013	
4	Inside Man	July 2014	
5	The First Order	Jan 2016	
6	Traitor's Dance	Aug 2022	

=== Stand-alone Novels ===
- Panic (Aug 2005)—nominated for the Thriller Award (given by the International Thriller Writers). Panic, has been optioned for film by The Weinstein Company and is in development.
- Fear (Aug 2006)
- Collision (Jul 2008)—known as Run in the United Kingdom Collision, has been optioned for film by Twentieth Century Fox.
- Trust Me (Jul 2009)
- Blame (Jul 2017)
- The Three Beths (October 2018)
- Never Ask Me (July 2020)
- An Ambush of Widows (July 2021)

=== Anthologies and Collections ===
Anthology or Collection	Contents	Publication Date	Editor
Magnolias and Mayhem	White Trash	Jan 2000	Jeffrey Marks
And the Dying is Easy	Salt on the Rim	Jun 2001	Joseph Pittman
High Stakes	Bet on Red	Sep 2003	Robert Randisi
Mystery Writers of America Presents Death Do Us Part	A Few Small Repairs	Aug 2004	Harlan Coben
The World's Finest Mystery and Crime Stories: Fifth Annual Collection	Bet on Red	Oct 2004	Ed Gorman Martin H. Greenberg
The Best American Mystery Stories 2004	Bet on Red	Oct 2004	Nelson DeMille Otto Penzler
Damn Near Dead	Tender Mercies	Jul 2006	Duane Swierczynski
These Guns for Hire	Seize Your Future	Oct 2006	J. A. Konrath
Greatest Hits	Karma Hits Dogma	Nov 2006	Robert J. Randisi
A Hell of a Woman	Luise Fischer	Dec 2007	Megan Abbott
Death's Excellent Vacation	Safe and Sound	Aug 2010	Charlaine Harris Toni L. P. Kelner
No Rest for the Dead: Twenty-Six Writers. One Mystery	wrote one chapter	Jul 2011	Andrew F. Gulli
Robot Uprisings	Human Intelligence	Apr 2014	Daniel H. Wilson John Joseph Adams
