= M. J. Rose =

American novelist

- Died: 12/11/2024
- Education: Syracuse University
- Occupation: Author
- Writing career
- Language: English
- Period: 1998–2024
- Genres: Thriller, International Suspense
- Website: www.mjrose.com

M. J. Rose was an American author and book marketing executive.

== Biography ==
Rose lived in Connecticut with the composer Doug Scofield and their dog, Winka.

Before she began her publishing career, Rose graduated from Syracuse University and worked in advertising, serving as Creative director of Rosenfeld Sirowitz and Lawson. One of her commercials is featured in the Museum of Modern Art in New York City.

=== Writing ===
She launched her publishing career in 1998, when she self-published her first novel, Lip Service. Traditional publishers had rejected it, unsure of how to market a book that did not fit into one distinct genre, so Rose set up a website where readers could download the book and began to promote it online. After the book sold 2500 copies in digital and paper formats, it was chosen by the Literary Guild/Doubleday Book Club and became the first e-book to be subsequently published by a mainstream New York publisher.

Following Lip Service, Rose wrote the thrillers In Fidelity (2001), Flesh Tones (2003), and Sheet Music (2004). Her Butterfield Institute Series introduced protagonist Dr. Morgan Snow, a renowned New York sex therapist, and includes The Halo Effect (2005), The Delilah Complex (2006), and The Venus Fix (2006). She also wrote the erotic novel, Lying in Bed (2006). She followed with a series focusing on reincarnation and other supernatural phenomena, starting with The Reincarnationist (2007), and continuing with The Memorist (2008) and The Hypnotist (2010). A fourth book in the series, The Book of Lost Fragrances, was released in March 2012. Seduction was released in 2013 and The Collector of Dying Breaths in 2014. The Reincarnationist was the inspiration for the Fox TV series "Past Life."

Rose provided book marketing services and consultation to authors through AuthorBuzz.com and ran a blog: Buzz, Balls & Hype. She co-authored Buzz Your Book with Doug Clegg, which she used to teach an online book marketing class of the same name.
