= State of the Onion =

2008 book by Julie Hyzy

- First edition
- Author: Julie Hyzy
- Genre: Mystery fiction
- Published: 2008
- Publisher: Berkley Books
- Pages: 325
- Awards: Anthony Award for Best Paperback Original (2009)
- ISBN: 978-0-425-21869-3
- Website: State of the Onion

State of the Onion is a book written by Julie Hyzy and published by Berkley Books on 2 January 2008, which later went on to win the Anthony Award for Best Paperback Original in 2009.
