= Elaine Viets =

American novelist

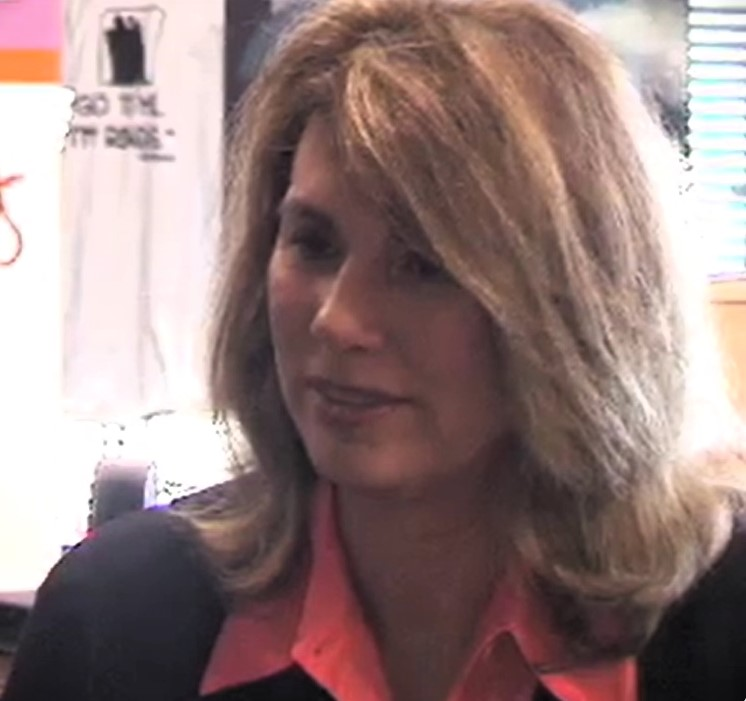
Viets interviewed in 2006

Elaine Viets (born c. 1950) is a Midwestern American newspaperwoman and mystery writer.

== Life and career ==
A native of St. Louis, Missouri, Viets has a degree in journalism and became a longtime popular media figure in St. Louis. She was a regular columnist for the St. Louis Post-Dispatch for 25 years, her columns focusing mostly on local issues and human-interest fare. She also hosted the local light-news television program Viets Beat, for which she won Emmy Awards in 1989 and 1990. After moving to Washington, D.C. and leaving the St. Louis Post-Dispatch, Viets wrote a syndicated column carried by United Feature Syndicate and later by United Media.

She also began writing mystery novels and eventually left the newspaper business almost entirely to become a full-time novelist. Viets first drew on her professional experience to produce four novels set in St. Louis and featuring fictional St. Louis newspaper columnist Francesca Vierling (and exciting speculation over which characters might represent real-life Post-Dispatch figures).

By the time she had written the last of these, Viets had relocated to Fort Lauderdale, Florida in 1997, which became the locale for her next novels, the Dead-End Jobs series. Viets researches these books herself by taking the same sort of low-level dead-end jobs—telemarketer, shop clerk, and so forth—as the series' protagonist, Helen Hawthorne.

Viets, married for over 30 years to author and actor Don Crinklaw, is active in the trade organizations Mystery Writers of America and Sisters in Crime. She is a board member of the Mystery Writers of America. In 2004, she was nominated for three Agatha Awards. In 2005, she won awards presented for Best Short Story at two notable mystery conventions: an Agatha Award at Malice Domestic Ltd and an Anthony Award at Bouchercon, both for her story Wedding Knife.

On April 11, 2007, Viets's fellow contributors to The Lipstick Chronicles reported that Viets had suffered a stroke. According to a subsequent update, Viets is recovering well and is again creating mysteries based on real life and the people who live it.

She appeared one the very first episode of Mythbusters during the "Biscuit Bullet" story.

== Publications ==
=== Francesca Vierling, Newspaper Columnist ===
#	Title	Publication Date	Publisher	ISBN
1	Back Stab	1997	Dell	ISBN 0-440-22431-4
2	Rubout	1998	Dell	ISBN 0-440-61348-5
3	The Pink Flamingo Murders	1999	Dell	ISBN 0-440-61351-5
4	Doc in the Box	2000	Dell	ISBN 0-440-23620-7

=== Dead-End Job ===
#	Title	Publication Date	Publisher	ISBN
1	Shop Till You Drop	2003	Signet	ISBN 0-451-20855-2
2	Murder Between the Covers	2003	Signet	ISBN 0-451-21081-6
3	Dying to Call You	2004	Signet	ISBN 0-451-21332-7
4	Just Murdered	2005	Signet	ISBN 0-451-21492-7
5	Murder Unleashed	2007	Signet	ISBN 0-451-22108-7
6	Murder with Reservations	2007	NAL Hardcover	ISBN 0-451-22111-7
7	Clubbed to Death	2008	NAL Hardcover	ISBN 978-1-615-51534-9
8	Killer Cuts	2009	Signet	ISBN 0-451-22854-5
9	Half-Price Homicide	2010	NAL Obsidian	ISBN 978-0-451-23154-3
10	Pumped for Murder	2011	NAL Obsidian	ISBN 978-0-451-23320-2
11	Final Sail	2012	NAL Obsidian	ISBN 978-0-451-23674-6
12	Board Stiff	2013	NAL Obsidian	ISBN 978-0-451-23985-3
13	Catnapped!	2014	Obsidian	ISBN 978-0-451-46630-3
14	Checked Out	2015	NAL Premier Mystery Series	ISBN 0451466322, 9780451466327
15	The Art of Murder	2016	NAL Berkley New American Library Premier Mystery Series	ISBN 0451476131, 9780451476135

=== Josie Marcus, Mystery Shopper ===
#	Title	Publication Date	Publisher	ISBN
1	Dying in Style	2005	Signet	ISBN 0-451-21679-2
2	High Heels Are Murder	2006	Signet	ISBN 0-451-21988-0
3	Accessory to Murder	2007	Signet	ISBN 0-451-22258-X
4	Murder with All the Trimmings	2008	Signet	ISBN 0-451-22548-1
5	The Fashion Hound Murders	2009	Signet	ISBN 978-0-451-22842-0
6	An Uplifting Murder	2010	Obsidian	ISBN 978-0-451-23170-3
7	Death on a Platter	2011	Obsidian	ISBN 978-0-451-23524-4
8	Murder Is a Piece of Cake	2012	Obsidian	ISBN 978-0-451-23851-1
9	Fixing to Die	2013	Signet	ISBN 978-0-451-24098-9
10	A Dog Gone Murder	2014	Signet	ISBN 9780451465986

=== Angela Richman, Death Investigator ===
#	Title	Publication Date	Publisher	ISBN
1	Brain Storm	2016	Thomas & Mercer Brilliance Audio Kindle	ISBN 1503936317, 9781503936317
2	Fire and Ashes	2017	Thomas & Mercer Brilliance Audio Kindle	ISBN 1477848800, 9781477848807
3	Ice Blonde	2018	JABberwocky Literary Agency Kindle	ISBN 1625673620, 9781625673626
4	Death Grip	2021	JABberwocky Literary Agency Kindle	ISBN 9780727890184

=== Anthologies and collections ===
Title	Contents	Publication Date	Publisher	ISBN
Images of St. Louis	Introduction	2000	University of Missouri	ISBN 0826206972, 9780826206978
Blood On Their Hands	Red Meat	2003	Berkley Prime Crime	ISBN 0-425-19035-8
High Stakes	Sex and Bingo	2003	Signet	ISBN 0-451-21018-2
The World's Finest Mystery and Crime Stories	Red Meat Sex and Bingo	2004	Forge	ISBN 0-765-31146-1
Chesapeake Crimes I	Wedding Knife	2004	Quiet Storm	ISBN 0-9749-6080-2
Show Business is Murder	Blonde Moment	2004	Berkley Prime Crime	ISBN 0-425-19652-6
Drop-Dead Blonde	Killer Blonde	2005	Signet	ISBN 0-451-21444-7
Alfred Hitchcock Mystery Magazine	After the Fall	January/February 2006		
Many Bloody Returns	Vampire Hours	2007	Ace Books	ISBN 978-0-441-01522-1
Alfred Hitchcock Mystery Magazine	Death of a Condo Commando	May 2009		
Vampires in Love	Vampire Hours	2010	Barnes & Noble	ISBN 978-1-435-11852-2
Crimes by Moonlight	The Bedroom Door	2010	Berkley Prime Crime	ISBN 978-0-425-23563-8
Alfred Hitchcock Mystery Magazine	Main Squeeze	November 2015		
Happy Homicides 2: Thirteen Cozy Mysteries	Red Meat	2016	Spot On Publishing Kindle	
Deal with the Devil and 13 Short Stories	The Seven	2018	Crippen & Landru	ISBN 1936363275, 9781936363278

=== Other books ===
Title	Coauthor	Publication Date	Publisher	ISBN
Urban Affairs: Tales from the Heart of the City		1988	Patrice Press	ISBN 0-935284-65-6, 9780935284652
Viets Guide to Sex, Travel and Anything Else That Will Sell This Book		1993	Patrice Press	ISBN 0-935284-72-9
St. Louis: Home on the River	Quinta Scott	1995	Towery Pub	ISBN 1881096181, 9781881096184
How to Commit Monogamy: A Lighthearted Look at Long-Term Love		1997	Andrews McMeel Publishing	ISBN 0836227239, 9780836227239
How to Survive the Happiest Day of Your Life		1997	Dh Audio (audio cassette)	ISBN 0886469023, 9780886469023
Censored Viets		1996	Wildstone Audio (audio cassette)	ISBN 1882467000, 9781882467006

== Related publications ==
- Kramer, Staci (February 1, 1996). "Viets-Post marriage on the rocks? Editor Woo takes over negotiations. (Includes related article on the 'Retain Elaine' party at Pancke House)". St. Louis Journalism Review. 26 (183).
- St. John, Burt (September 1, 1996). "Viets' future with the Post uncertain; she continues to build syndication". St. Louis Journalism Review. 26 (189).
