= Missoula Independent =

Newspaper in Missoula, Montana

- Type: Alternative newspaper
- Owner: Lee Enterprises
- Founded: 1991; 34 years ago
- Ceased publication: September 11, 2018; 7 years ago
- Headquarters: 317 S. Orange St. Missoula, MT 59802
- Circulation: 41,000
- ISSN: 2642-4665

The Missoula Independent was a free weekly alternative newspaper in Missoula, Montana, United States. It was acquired by Lee Enterprises, owner of the daily Missoulian, in 2017. On September 11, 2018, Lee Enterprises shut down the Independent without notice.

In 2018, the Independent's non-management employees filed a petition with the National Labor Relations Board to hold an election on whether to affiliate with the News Guild for the purposes of collective bargaining. In a letter sent to staff, general manager and former Independent owner Matt Gibson announced his position to the effort, stating that the newspaper is losing money.

== Content ==
The Independent published investigative journalism, political analysis, and critical coverage of local music and culture. The paper also maintained an events calendar for the Missoula area. The Independent also published nationally syndicated columns including "News Quirks" by Roland Sweet, "Advice Goddess" by Amy Alkon, "Free Will Astrology" by Rob Brezsny, and several local columns as well. The paper also published the "Jonesin" crossword puzzle by Matt Jones and the comic strip This Modern World by Tom Tomorrow. The Independent published a popular "Best of Missoula" issue every year that showcases readers' favorite food, culture, people, and media in the Missoula area.
