= Julie Hyzy =

American author of mystery fiction

- Occupation: Author
- Writing career
- Pen name: N. C. Hyzy; S. F. Hyzy
- Genre: Mystery fiction
- Notable awards: Anthony Award (2009)

Julie Hyzy is an American author of mystery fiction.

== Life and career ==
Hyzy writes a series of books about sleuth Alex St James, a news researcher, which combines mystery and adventure, and another about Olivia Paras, assistant chef at the White house, which sits in the subgenre "culinary mysteries". Her State of the Onion, from the latter series, won an Anthony Award and other awards. She has a third series, the Manor House Mysteries, featuring amateur sleuth Grace Wheaton, curator of palatial Marshfield Manor.

Hyzy studied business at college and worked in business-related jobs until taking up fiction writing. She also writes under two pseudonyms, N. C. Hyzy and S. F. Hyzy.

== Books ==
Alex St James series

- Deadly Blessings (2005) Five Star. ISBN 1594142904
- Deadly Interest (2006) Five Star. ISBN 978-1594144943
- Dead Ringer (2008) Five Star. ISBN 978-1594147135
  (with Michael A. Black)

White House Chef Mysteries - Ollie Paras series

- State of the Onion (2008) Berkley Prime Crime Press. ISBN 978-0425218693
  (2009 Anthony Award for Best Paperback Original, 2009 Barry Award for Best Paperback Original, 2009 Lovey Award for Best Traditional Mystery.)
- Hail to the Chef (2008) Berkley Prime Crime Press. ISBN 978-0425224991
- Eggsecutive Orders (2010) Berkley Prime Crime Press. ISBN 978-0425232033
- Buffalo West Wing (2011) Berkley Prime Crime Press. ISBN 978-0425239230
- Affairs of Steak (2012) Berkley Prime Crime Press. ISBN 978-0425245835
- Fonduing Fathers (2012) Berkley Prime Crime Press. ISBN 978-0425251812
- Home of the Braised (2014) Berkley Prime Crime Press. ISBN 978-0425262382
- All the President's Menus (2015) Berkley Prime Crime Press. ISBN 978-0425262399
- Foreign Eclairs (2016) Berkley Prime Crime Press. ISBN 978-0425262405

Manor House Mysteries - Grace Wheaton series

- Grace Under Pressure (2010) Berkley Prime Crime Press. ISBN 978-0425235218
- Grace Interrupted (2011) Berkley Prime Crime Press. ISBN 978-0425241905
- Grace Among Thieves (2012) Berkley Prime Crime Press. ISBN 978-0425251393
- Grace Takes Off (2013) Berkley Prime Crime Press. ISBN 978-0425259665
- Grace Against the Clock (2014) Berkley Prime Crime Press. ISBN 978-0425259672

Other

- Artistic License (2004) Five Star. ISBN 1594141126

Ebooks as N. C. Hyzy

- Playing With Matches, a Riley Drake Mystery
- Mystery Short Stories

== See also ==
- Mystery (fiction)
- List of female detective/mystery writers
- List of female detective characters
