= Buffalo West Wing =

2011 novel by Julie Hyzy

- First edition
- Author: Julie Hyzy
- Genre: Mystery fiction
- Published: 2011
- Publisher: Berkley Books
- Pages: 305
- Awards: Anthony Award for Best Paperback Original (2012)
- ISBN: 978-0-425-23923-0
- Website: Buffalo West Wing

Buffalo West Wing is a book written by Julie Hyzy and published by Berkley Books (an imprint of Penguin Random House) on 4 January 2011, which later went on to win the Anthony Award for Best Paperback Original in 2012.
