= Fatal Truth =

Book by Robin Burcell

- Author: Robin Burcell
- Genre: Mystery fiction
- Published: 2002
- Publisher: Avon Books
- Pages: 288
- Awards: Anthony Award for Best Paperback Original (2003)
- ISBN: 978-0-061-06123-3
- Website: Fatal Truth

Fatal Truth is a book written by Robin Burcell and published by Avon Books (now owned by HarperCollins) on 30 July 2002, which later went on to win the Anthony Award for Best Paperback Original in 2003.
