= Toni Kelner =

Author

Toni L.P. Kelner
- Partner(s): Stephen Paul Kelner, Jr.
- Children: Two daughters
- Writing career
- Genres: Fantasy, Mystery
- Website: www.tonilpkelner.comleighperryauthor.com

Toni Leigh Perry Kelner, writing as Toni L.P. Kelner and Leigh Perry, is an author of three mystery series: the eight Laura Fleming novels and related short stories; the Where Are They Now? series, which includes three novels and a forthcoming short story; and the Family Skeleton series, which consists of six books and one short story, with a seventh book forthcoming. She has also edited seven urban fantasy anthologies with Charlaine Harris. Many Bloody Returns, Wolfsbane and Mistletoe, and Home Improvement: Undead Edition were on the extended New York Times best seller list, and Death's Excellent Vacation debuted at #8 on the NYT list. Kelner has written a number of short stories in anthologies and magazines. Her most recent is "The Skeleton Rides a Horse".

Kelner's short fiction has been nominated for the Agatha, the Anthony, the Macavity, and the Derringer awards, and her story "Sleeping With the Plush" won the Agatha for Best Short Story of 2006. Her novels have been nominated for several RT BOOKclub awards, and Kelner won an RT BOOKclub Career Achievement Award.

== Bibliography ==
=== Laura Fleming ===
1. Down Home Murder (June 1993)
2. Dead Ringer (February 1994)
3. Trouble Looking for a Place to Happen (March 1995)
4. Country Comes to Town (September 1996)
5. Tight as a Tick (January 1998)
6. Death of a Damn Yankee (August 1999)
7. Mad as the Dickens (October 2001)
8. Wed and Buried (February 2003)

=== Where Are They Now? ===
1. Curse of the Kissing Cousins (originally published as Without Mercy) (May 2009)
2. Who Killed the Pinup Queen? (January 2010)
3. Blast from the Past (February 2011)

=== A Family Skeleton Mystery ===
published as Leigh Perry

1. A Skeleton in the Family (September 2013)
2. The Skeleton Takes a Bow (September 2014)
3. The Skeleton Haunts a House (October 2015)
4. The Skeleton Paints a Picture (October 2017)
5. The Skeleton Makes a Friend (October 2018)
6. The Skeleton Stuffs a Stocking (September 2019)

=== Anthologies and collections ===
Collection or Anthology	Contents	Publication Date	Editor
Many Bloody Returns		Oct 2007	Charlaine Harris
Wolfsbane and Mistletoe		Oct 2008	Charlaine Harris
Crimes By Moonlight	Taking the Long View	Apr 2010	Charlaine Harris
Death's Excellent Vacation	Pirate Dave's Haunted Amusement Park	Aug 2010	Charlaine Harris Toni L. P. Kelner
Home Improvement: Undead Edition		Aug 2011	Charlaine Harris
An Apple for the Creature	Pirate Dave and the Captain's Ghost	Sep 2012	Charlaine Harris
Games Creatures Play		Apr 2014	Charlaine Harris
Dead But Not Forgotten		Nov 2014	Charlaine Harris
Laura Fleming Collection: Crooked as a Dog's Hind Leg	Gift of the Murderer Marley’s Ghost The Death of Erik the Redneck An Unmentionable Crime Bible Belt Old Dog Days Lying-in-the-Road Death	Nov 2015	Toni Kelner
