= Dana Cameron =

American archaeologist and author

- Born: 1965 (age 60–61)
- Education: Ph.D.
- Occupations: Writer; archaeologist
- Writing career
- Period: 2002–present
- Genres: Mystery; urban fantasy
- Notable awards: Agatha, Anthony, and Macavity
- Website: www.danacameron.com

Dana Cameron (born 1965) is an American archaeologist, and author of award-winning crime fiction and urban fantasy.

== Life and career ==
Born and raised in Massachusetts, Dana Cameron began her professional career as an historical archaeologist specializing in British and New England cultural history from 1607 to 1760. She presently lives in Beverly, Massachusetts.

Her archaeological training and experiences in the field led her to write fiction; the first of six archaeology mysteries was published in 2002. The novels feature amateur sleuth Professor Emma Fielding and all are set in fictional towns in New England, with the exception of Grave Consequences, which takes place in a fictional town in the southeast of England. Each novel features some aspect of archaeological research and considers how the past and the present are enmeshed. One Emma Fielding short story, "Mischief in Mesopotamia", was published in Ellery Queen's Mystery Magazine in 2012. Shortlisted for the prestigious Mystery Writers of America's Edgar Award, Dana Cameron has won multiple Agatha, Anthony, and Macavity awards.

Cameron's short stories are also informed by her research. The historical and fantastic elements are an integral part of her fantasy world-building. Her stories vary in range from traditional mystery to historical passing by noir, thriller and urban fantasy. She often follows a single character throughout several stories. "The Night Things Changed" eventually led to a series of urban novels set in the urban fantasy Fangborn universe, featuring vampires, werewolves, and oracles dedicated to secretly fighting evil. The protagonist, Zoe Miller, is an archaeologist who is forced to accept that she is also werewolf and Fangborn and must use those powers, along with her archaeology training, to keep artifacts with potentially world-ending power from falling into the hands of human and Fangborn foes.

Cameron's professional affiliations include the Mystery Writers of America, Sisters in Crime (she served on the board and as Vice President and President of the New England Chapter), and the American Crime Writers League. She is also a member of The Baker Street Irregulars (BSI), a "Sherlockian literary society", with the investiture of "The Giant Rat of Sumatra".

== Published works ==
=== Emma Fielding Archaeology Mysteries ===
- Site Unseen (2002). ISBN 0380819546
- Grave Consequences (2002). ISBN 0380819554
- Past Malice (2003) ISBN 0380819562
- A Fugitive Truth (2004). ISBN 0060554622
- More Bitter Than Death (2005). ISBN 0060554630
- Ashes and Bones (2006). ISBN 0060554673

=== Fangborn Urban Fantasy ===
- Seven Kinds of Hell (2013). ISBN 978-1611097955
- Pack of Strays (2014). ISBN 978-1477819777
- Hellbender (2015).

=== Short stories ===
- "The Lords of Misrule", in Sugarplums and Scandal (2006)
- "Mischief in Mesopotamia", in Ellery Queen's Mystery Magazine (2012)
- "The Sun, the Moon, and the Stars", in Dead But Not Forgotten (2014)
- "Whiskey and Light", in Seize the Night (2014)
- "Where There Is Honey", in Echoes of Sherlock Holmes (2016)
- "The White Rat", in The Grimm Future (2016)

==== Fangborn ====
- "The Night Things Changed" in Wolfsbane and Mistletoe (2008)
- "Swing Shift" in Crimes By Moonlight (2010)
- "Love Knot" in The Wild Side (2011)
- "Pattern Recognition" in Murder and Mayhem in Muskego (2012)
- "Finals" in Alfred Hitchcock Mystery Magazine (2013)
- "The Serpent's Tale" an Amazon Kindle Short (2013)
- "The God's Games" in Games Creatures Play (2014)
- "The Curious Case of Miss Amelia Vernet", an Amazon Kindle Short (2014)
- "Burning the Rule Book", an Amazon Kindle Short (2015)

==== Anna Hoyt "Colonial Noir" ====
- "Femme Sole", in Boston Noir (2009)
- "Disarming" in Ellery Queen's Mystery Magazine (2011)
- "Ardent" in Cape Cod Noir (2011)
- "Declaration", in Ellery Queen's Mystery Magazine (2014)
- "An Obliging Cousin", in Ellery Queen's Mystery Magazine (2016)

==== "a/k/a Jayne" thrillers ====
- "One Soul at a Time" in Ellery Queen's Mystery Magazine (2012)
- "Dialing In" in Ellery Queen's Mystery Magazine (2013)
- "Episode 4: Raven and the Cave Girl vs. Dan Malmon!" in Killing Malmon (2017)

== TV adaptations ==
In 2016, the Emma Fielding novels were optioned by Muse Entertainment. Site Unseen: An Emma Fielding Mystery, a two-hour TV movie, premiered in June 2017 on the Hallmark Movies & Mysteries Channel, starring Courtney Thorne-Smith and James Tupper. The second movie, Past Malice: An Emma Fielding Mystery, premiered in January 2018, and a third, More Bitter Than Death, was telecast in 2019.

== Awards and honors ==
2007
Ashes and Bones, Anthony Award (winner), Best Paperback Original
"The Lords of Misrule", Anthony Award nominee, Best Short Story

2009
"The Night Things Changed", Agatha Award ((2008) winner), Anthony Award (nominee), Macavity Award (winner), Best Short Story

2010
"Femme Sole", Edgar Award (nominee), Agatha Award ((2009) nominee), Anthony Award (nominee), Macavity Award (nominee), Best Short Story

2011
"Swing Shift", Agatha Award ((2010), nominee), Anthony Award (winner), Macavity Award (winner), Best Short story

2012
"Disarming", Agatha Award ((2011), winner), Anthony Award (winner), Macavity Award (winner), Best Short Story
Toast Master, Malice Domestic 24
"One Soul at Time" was named a "Black Mask" feature in Ellery Queen's Mystery Magazine

2013
"Mischief in Mesopotamia", Agatha Award ((2012), winner), Anthony Award (winner), Best Short Story
