= Agatha Award =

Literary awards for mystery and crime writers

Agatha Awards
- Description: Literary awards presented for excellence in traditional mystery and crime fiction
- Location: Washington, D.C.
- Country: United States
- Presented by: Malice Domestic Ltd
- Website: https://www.malicedomestic.net/agatha-awards/

The Agatha Awards, named for Agatha Christie, are literary awards for mystery and crime writers who write in the traditional mystery subgenre: "books typified by the works of Agatha Christie . . . loosely defined as mysteries that contain no explicit sex, excessive gore or gratuitous violence, and are not classified as 'hard-boiled.'" At an annual convention in Washington, D.C., the Agatha Awards are handed out by Malice Domestic Ltd, in six categories: Best Novel; Best First Mystery; Best Historical Novel; Best Short Story; Best Non-Fiction; Best Children's/Young Adult Mystery. Additionally, in some years the Poirot Award is presented to honor individuals other than writers who have made outstanding contributions to the mystery genre, but it is not an annual award.

Early meetings of the Malice Domestic Committee occurred in fall 1987, with the first convention held on April 21–23, 1989, in Silver Spring, MD. Malice Domestic Ltd was incorporated in 1992. It is governed by a volunteer board of directors.

== Awards ==
Winners and, where known, nominated titles for each year:

=== Best First Novel ===
==== 1980s ====
Agatha Award for Best First Novel, 1988-1989
Year	Author	Title	Publisher	Result	Ref.
1988	Elizabeth George	A Great Deliverance	Bantam Books	Winner	
1988	Caroline Graham	The Killings at Badger's Drift		Finalist	
1988	Corinne Holt Sawyer	The J. Alfred Prufrock Murders		Finalist	
1988	Susannah Stacey	Goodbye Nanny Grey		Finalist	
1988	Dorothy Sucher	Dead Men Don't Give Seminars		Finalist	
1989	Jill Churchill	Grime and Punishment	Avon	Winner	
1989	Eleanor Boylan	Working Murder		Finalist	
1989	Frances Fyfield	A Question of Guilt		Finalist	
1989	Melanie Johnson Howe	The Mother Shadow		Finalist	
1989	Edith Skom	The Mark Twain Murders		Finalist	

==== 1990s ====
Agatha Award for Best First Novel, 1990-1999
Year	Author	Title	Publisher	Result	Ref.
1990	Katherine Hall Page	The Body in the Belfry	St. Martin's Press	Winner	
1990	Pat Burden	Screaming Bones		Finalist	
1990	William F. Love	The Chartreuse Clue		Finalist	
1990	Diane Mott Davidson	Catering to Nobody		Finalist	
1990	Janet L. Smith	Sea of Troubles		Finalist	
1991	Mary Willis Walker	Zero at the Bone	St. Martin's Press	Winner	
1991	Mary Cahill	Carpool		Finalist	
1991	Mary Daheim	Just Desserts		Finalist	
1991	Rebecca Rothenberg	The Bulrush Murders		Finalist	
1991	Ann Williams	Flowers for the Dead		Finalist	
1992	Barbara Neely	Blanche on the Lam	St. Martin's Press	Winner	
1992	Deborah Adams	All the Great Pretenders		Finalist	
1992	Carol Higgins Clark	Decked		Finalist	
1992	Miriam Grace Monfredo	Seneca Falls Inheritance		Finalist	
1992	Susan Wittig Albert	Thyme of Death		Finalist	
1993	Nevada Barr	Track of the Cat	Putnam	Winner	
1993	Jan Burke	Goodnight, Irene		Finalist	
1993	Deborah Crombie	A Share in Death		Finalist	
1993	Sharan Newman	Death Comes as Ephiphany		Finalist	
1993	Abigail Padgett	Child of Silence		Finalist	
1994	Jeff Abbott	Do Unto Others	Ballantine	Winner	
1994	Barbara Burnett Smith	Writers of the Purple Sage		Finalist	
1994	Janet Evanovich	One for the Money	Scribner	Finalist	
1994	Earlene Fowler	Fool's Puzzle		Finalist	
1994	Polly Whitney	Until Death		Finalist	
1995	Jeanne M. Dams	The Body in the Transept	Walker	Winner	
1995	Teri Holbrook	A Far and Deadly Cry		Finalist	
1995	Jody Jaffe	Horse of a Different Killer		Finalist	
1995	Virginia Lanier	Death in Bloodhound Red		Finalist	
1995	Martha C. Lawrence	Murder in Scorpio		Finalist	
1996	Anne George	Murder on a Girl's Night Out	Avon	Winner	
1996	Dale Furutani	Death in Little Tokyo: A Ken Tanaka Mystery	St. Martin’s	Finalist	
1996	Terris Grimes	Somebody Else's Child	Onyx Books	Finalist	
1996	Teri Holbrook	The Grass Widow	Bantam Books	Finalist	
1996	Margaret K. Lawrence	Hearts and Bone: A Novel of Historical Suspense	Avon	Finalist	
1996	Lillian M. Roberts	Riding for a Fall	Gold Medal	Finalist	
1997	Sujata Massey	The Salaryman's Wife	HarperCollins	Winner	
1997	Joanne Dobson	Quieter Than Sleep	Doubleday	Finalist	
1997	Phyllis Richman	The Butter Did It	HarperCollins	Finalist	
1997	Penny Warner	Dead Body Language	Bantam Books	Finalist	
1997	Barbara Jaye Wilson	Death Brims Over	Avon	Finalist	
1998	Robin Hathaway	The Doctor Digs a Grave	Minotaur Books	Winner	
1998	Jerrilyn Farmer	Sympathy for the Devil	Avon	Finalist	
1998	Jacqueline Fiedler	Tiger's Palette	Pocket	Finalist	
1998	Judy Fitzwater	Dying to Get Published	Fawcett	Finalist	
1998	Sharon Kahn	Fax Me a Bagel	Scribner	Finalist	
1999	Donna Andrews	Murder with Peacocks	Thomas Dunne Books	Winner	
1999	April Henry	Circles of Confusion	HarperTorch	Finalist	
1999	Kris Neri	Revenge of the Gypsy Queen	Rainbow Books	Finalist	
1999	Elena Santangelo	By Blood Possessed	Minotaur Books	Finalist	
1999	Marcia Talley	Sing It to Her Bones	Dell	Finalist	

==== 2000s ====
Agatha Award for Best First Novel, 2000-2009
Year	Author	Title	Publisher	Result	Ref.
2000	Rosemary Stevens [fr]	Death on a Silver Tray	Berkley Prime Crime	Winner	
2000	Julie W. Herman	Three Dirty Women and the Garden of Death	Overmountain Press	Finalist	
2000	Irene Marcuse	Death of an Amiable Child	Walker & Company	Finalist	
2000	Denise Swanson	Murder of a Small Town Honey	Signet	Finalist	
2001	Sarah Strohmeyer	Bubbles Unbound	Dutton	Winner	
2001	Tim Myers	Innkeeping with Murder	Berkley Prime Crime	Finalist	
2001	Charlie O'Brien	Mute Witness	Poisoned Pen Press	Finalist	
2001	Andy Straka	A Witness Above	Signet	Finalist	
2002	Julia Spencer-Fleming	In the Bleak Midwinter	Minotaur Books	Winner	
2002	Pip Granger	Not All Tarts Are Apple	Poisoned Pen Press	Finalist	
2002	Roberta Isleib	Six Strokes Under	Berkley Prime Crime	Finalist	
2002	Claire M. Johnson	Beat Until Stiff	Poisoned Pen Press	Finalist	
2002	Nancy Martin	How to Murder a Millionaire	Signet	Finalist	
2002	Lea Wait	Shadows at the Fair	Scribner	Finalist	
2003	Jacqueline Winspear	Maisie Dobbs	Soho Press Inc.	Winner	
2003	Elaine Flinn [fr]	Dealing in Murder	Avon	Finalist	
2003	Erin Hart	Haunted Ground	Scribner	Finalist	
2003	S.W. Hubbard	Take the Bait	Pocket Books	Finalist	
2003	Maddy Hunter	Alpine for You	Pocket Books	Finalist	
2003	Joyce Kreig	Murder off Mike	Minotaur Books	Finalist	
2003	Sarah Stewart Taylor [de]	O’ Artful Death	St. Martin's Press	Finalist	
2004	Harley Jane Kozak	Dating Dead Men	Doubleday	Winner	
2004	Judy Clemens	Till the Cows Come Home	Poisoned Pen Press	Finalist	
2004	Patricia Harwin	Arson and Old Lace	Pocket Books	Finalist	
2004	Susan Kandel	I Dreamed I Married Perry Mason	HarperCollins	Finalist	
2004	Pari Noskin Taichert	The Clovis Incident: A Mystery	University of New Mexico Press	Finalist	
2004	Dorothy Salisbury Davis and Jerome Ross	God Speed the Night		Finalist	
2005	Laura Durham [fr]	Better Off Wed	HarperCollins	Winner	
2005	Laura Bradford	Jury of One	Hilliard & Harris	Finalist	
2005	Shirley Damsgaard	Witch Way to Murder	Avon	Finalist	
2005	Maggie Sefton	Knit One, Kill Two		Finalist	
2005	Lisa Tillman	Blood Relations	Hilliard & Harris	Finalist	
2006	Sandra Parshall [fr]	The Heat of the Moon	Poisoned Pen Press	Winner	
2006	Jane Cleland	Consigned to Death	Minotaur Books	Finalist	
2006	Honora Finkelstein and Susan Smily	The Chef Who Died Sauteing	Hilliard & Harris	Finalist	
2006	Hailey Lind	Feint of Art	Signet	Finalist	
2006	Karen MacInerney	Murder on the Rocks	Midnight Ink	Finalist	
2007	Hank Phillippi Ryan	Prime Time	Harlequin	Winner	
2007	Charles Finch	A Beautiful Blue Death	Minotaur Books	Finalist	
2007	Beth Groundwater	A Real Basket Case	Five Star Mystery	Finalist	
2007	Deanna Raybourn	Silent in the Grave	Mira Books	Finalist	
2008	G. M. Malliet	Death of a Cozy Writer	Midnight Ink	Winner	
2008	Sarah Atwell	Through a Glass, Deadly		Finalist	
2008	Joanna Campbell Slan	Paper, Scissors, Death		Finalist	
2008	Krista Davis	The Diva Runs Out of Thyme	Penguin Group	Finalist	
2008	Rosemary Harris	Pushing Up Daisies	Minotaur Books	Finalist	
2009	Alan Bradley	The Sweetness at the Bottom of the Pie	Delacorte Press	Winner	
2009	Lisa Bork	For Better, for Murder		Finalist	
2009	Meredith Cole	Posed for Murder	Minotaur Books	Finalist	
2009	Elizabeth J. Duncan	The Cold Light of Mourning	St. Martin's Press	Finalist	
2009	Stefanie Pintoff	In the Shadow of Gotham	Minotaur Books	Finalist	

==== 2010s ====
Agatha Award for Best First Novel, 2010-2019
Year	Author	Title	Result	Ref.
2010	Avery Aames [fr; ja]	The Long Quiche Goodbye	Winner	
2010	Laura Alden	Murder at the PTA	Finalist	
2010	Deborah Blum	The Poisoner's Handbook	Finalist	
2010	Amanda Flower	Maid of Murder	Finalist	
2010	Sasscer Hill	Full Mortality	Finalist	
2010	Alan Orloff	Diamonds for the Dead	Finalist	
2011	Sara J. Henry [fr]	Learning to Swim	Winner	
2011	Janet Bolin	Dire Threads	Finalist	
2011	Kaye George	Choke	Finalist	
2011	Rochelle Staab	Who Do, Voodoo?	Finalist	
2011	Kari Lee Townsend	Tempest in the Tea Leaves	Finalist	
2012	Susan M. Boyer	Lowcountry Boil	Winner	
2012	Duffy Brown	Iced Chiffon	Finalist	
2012	Erika Chase	A Killer Read	Finalist	
2012	Mollie Cox Bryan	A Scrapbook of Secrets	Finalist	
2012	Stephanie Jaye Evans	Faithful Unto Death	Finalist	
2013	Leslie Budewitz	Death Al Dente	Winner	
2013	Shelley Costa	You Cannoli Die Once	Finalist	
2013	Kendel Lynn	Board Stiff	Finalist	
2013	Liz Mugavero	Kneading to Die	Finalist	
2013	LynDee Walker	Front Page Fatality	Finalist	
2014	Terrie Farley Moran	Well Read, Then Dead	Winner	
2014	Annette Dashoffy	Circle of Influence	Finalist	
2014	Sherry Harris	Tagged for Death	Finalist	
2014	Susan O'Brien	Finding Sky	Finalist	
2014	Tracy Weber	Murder Strikes a Pose	Finalist	
2015	Art Taylor	On the Road with Del and Louise	Winner	
2015	Tessa Arlen	Death of a Dishonorable Gentleman	Finalist	
2015	Cindy Brown	Macdeath	Finalist	
2015	Ellen Byron	Plantation Shudders	Finalist	
2015	Julianne Holmes	Just Killing Time	Finalist	
2016	Cynthia Kuhn	The Semester of Our Discontent	Winner	
2016	Marla Cooper	Terror in Taffeta	Finalist	
2016	Alexia Gordon	Murder in G Major	Finalist	
2016	Nadine Nettmann	Decanting a Murder	Finalist	
2016	Renee Patrick	Design for Dying	Finalist	
2017	Kellye Garrett	Hollywood Homicide	Winner	
2017	Micki Browning	Adrift	Finalist	
2017	V.M. Burns	The Plot is Murder	Finalist	
2017	Laura Oles	Daughters of Bad Men	Finalist	
2017	Kathleen Valenti	Protocol	Finalist	
2018	Dianne Freeman [fr]	A Ladies Guide to Etiquette and Murder	Winner	
2018	Shari Randall	Curses, Boiled Again	Winner	
2018	Edwin Hill	Little Comfort	Finalist	
2018	Aimee Hix	What Doesn't Kill You	Finalist	
2018	Keenan Powell	Deadly Solution	Finalist	
2019	Tara Laskowski [fr]	One Night Gone	Winner	
2019	Connie Berry	A Dream of Death	Finalist	
2019	S. C. Perkins	Murder Once Removed	Finalist	
2019	Ang Pompano	When It’s Time for Leaving	Finalist	
2019	Grace Topping	Staging is Murder	Finalist	

==== 2020s ====
Agatha Award for Best First Novel, 2020-2029
Year	Author	Title	Result	Ref.
2020	Erica Neubauer	Murder at the Mena House	Winner	
2020	Esme Addison	A Spell for Trouble	Finalist	
2020	Tina Debellegarde	Winter Witness	Finalist	
2020	Mary Keliikoa	Derailed	Finalist	
2020	Laura Jensen Walker	Murder Most Sweet	Finalist	
2021	Mia P. Manansala	Arsenic and Adobo	Winner	
2021	Mally Becker	The Turncoat's Widow	Finalist	
2021	Lori Duffy Foster	A Dead Man's Eyes	Finalist	
2021	Judy L. Murray	Murder in the Master	Finalist	
2021	Raquel V. Reyes	Mango, Mambo, and Murder	Finalist	
2022	Korina Moss	Cheddar Off Dead	Winner	
2022	M. A. Monnin	Death in the Aegean	Finalist	
2022	Harini Nagendra	The Bangalore Detectives Club	Finalist	
2022	Rob Osler	Devil's Chew Toy	Finalist	
2022	Joan Long	The Finalist	Finalist	
2022	Nina Wachsman	The Gallery of Beauties	Finalist	
2023	Daphne Silver	Crime and Parchment	Winner	
2023	Danielle Arceneaux	Glory Be	Finalist	
2023	Kristin Kisska	The Hint of Light	Finalist	
2023	Josh Pachter	Dutch Threat	Finalist	
2023	Nina Simon	Mother-Daughter Murder Night	Finalist	
2024	K.T. Nguyen	You Know What You Did	Winner	
2024	Jenny Adams	A Deadly Endeavor	Finalist	
2024	Elizabeth Crowens	Hounds of Hollywood Baskervilles	Finalist	
2024	Elle Jauffret	Threads of Deception	Finalist	
2024	Jennifer K. Morita	Ghosts of Waikiki	Finalist	
2025	Adrian Andover	Whiskey Business	Winner	
2025	K.L. Borges	Murder in the Crazy Mountains	Finalist	
2025	Shelly Jones	Player Elimination	Finalist	
2025	Sandra Jackson-Opoku	Savvy Summers and the Sweet Potato Crimes	Finalist	
2025	Michael Rigg	Voices of the Elysian Fields	Finalist	

=== Best Contemporary Novel ===
==== 2010s ====
Agatha Award for Best Contemporary Novel, 2013-2019
Year	Author	Title	Result	Ref.
2013	Hank Phillippi Ryan	The Wrong Girl	Winner	
2013	G. M. Malliet	Pagan Spring	Finalist	
2013	Louise Penny	How the Light Gets In	Finalist	
2013	Barbara Ross	Clammed Up	Finalist	
2013	Julia Spencer-Fleming	Through the Evil Days	Finalist	
2014	Hank Phillippi Ryan	Truth Be Told	Winner	
2014	Donna Andrews	The Good, the Bad and the Emus	Finalist	
2014	G. M. Malliet	A Demon Summer	Finalist	
2014	Margaret Maron	Designated Daughters	Finalist	
2014	Louise Penny	The Long Way Home	Finalist	
2015	Margaret Maron	Long Upon the Land	Winner	
2015	Annette Dashofy	Bridges Burned	Finalist	
2015	Catriona McPherson	The Child Garden	Finalist	
2015	Louise Penny	Nature of the Beast	Finalist	
2015	Hank Phillippi Ryan	What You See	Finalist	
2016	Louise Penny	A Great Reckoning	Winner	
2016	Ellen Byron	Body on the Bayou	Finalist	
2016	Catriona McPherson	Quiet Neighbors	Finalist	
2016	Barbara Ross	Fogged Inn	Finalist	
2016	Hank Phillippi Ryan	Say No More	Finalist	
2017	Louise Penny	Glass Houses	Winner	
2017	Allison Brook	Death Overdue	Finalist	
2017	Ellen Byron	A Cajun Christmas Killing	Finalist	
2017	Annette Dashofy	No Way Home	Finalist	
2017	Margaret Maron	Take Out	Finalist	
2018	Ellen Byron	Mardi Gras Murder	Winner	
2018	Bruce Robert Coffin	Beyond the Truth	Finalist	
2018	Annette Dashofy	Cry Wolf	Finalist	
2018	Louise Penny	Kingdom of the Blind	Finalist	
2018	Hank Phillippi Ryan	Trust Me	Finalist	
2019	Ann Cleeves	The Long Call	Winner	
2019	Ellen Byron	Fatal Cajun Festival	Finalist	
2019	Annette Dashofy	Fair Game	Finalist	
2019	Edwin Hill	The Missing Ones	Finalist	
2019	Louise Penny	A Better Man	Finalist	
2019	Hank Phillippi Ryan	The Murder List	Finalist	

==== 2020s ====
Agatha Award for Best Contemporary Novel, 2020-2029
Year	Author	Title	Result	Ref.
2020	Louise Penny	All the Devils Are Here	Winner	
2020	Donna Andrews	The Gift of the Magpie	Finalist	
2020	Ellen Byron	Murder in the Bayou Boneyard	Finalist	
2020	Sherry Harris	From Beer to Eternity	Finalist	
2020	Lori Rader-Day	The Lucky One	Finalist	
2021	Ellen Byron	Cajun Kiss of Death	Winner	
2021	Edwin Hill	Watch Her	Finalist	
2021	Louise Penny	The Madness of Crowds	Finalist	
2021	Hank Phillippi Ryan	Her Perfect Life	Finalist	
2021	Gabriel Valjan	Symphony Road	Finalist	
2022	Louise Penny	A World of Curiosities	Winner	
2022	Ellen Byron	Bayou Book Thief	Finalist	
2022	Jennifer J. Chow	Death By Bubble Tea	Finalist	
2022	Annette Dashofy	Fatal Reunion	Finalist	
2022	Tina De Bellegarde	Dead Man's Leap	Finalist	
2023	Tara Laskowski	The Weekend Retreat	Winner	
2023	Ellen Byron	Wined and Died in New Orleans	Finalist	
2023	Annette Dashofy	Helpless	Finalist	
2023	Korina Moss	Case of the Bleus	Finalist	
2023	Gigi Pandian	The Raven Thief	Finalist	
2024	Gigi Pandian	A Midnight Puzzle	Winner	
2024	Connie Berry	A Collection of Lies	Finalist	
2024	Ellen Byron	A Very Woodsy Murder	Finalist	
2024	Ann Cleeves	The Dark Wives	Finalist	
2024	Korina Moss	Fondue or Die	Finalist	
2025	Mindy Quigley	At Death's Dough	Winner	
2025	Connie Berry	A Grave Deception	Finalist	
2025	Lori Robbins	Murder in Fifth Position	Finalist	
2025	Annette Dashofy	The Devil Comes Calling	Finalist	
2025	Leslie Karst	Waters of Destruction	Finalist	

=== Best Novel ===
==== 1980s ====
Agatha Award for Best Novel,1988-1989
Year	Author	Title	Publisher	Result	Ref.
1988	Carolyn G. Hart	Something Wicked	Bantam	Winner	
1988	Dorothy Cannell	The Widow's Club		Finalist	
1988	Joan Hess	Mischief in Maggody		Finalist	
1988	Sharyn McCrumb	Paying the Piper		Finalist	
1988	Nancy Pickard	Dead Crazy		Finalist	
1989	Elizabeth Peters	Naked Once More	Warner	Winner	
1989	Sarah Caudwell	The Sirens Sang of Murder		Finalist	
1989	Carolyn G. Hart	A Little Class on Murder		Finalist	
1989	Margaret Maron	Corpus Christmas		Finalist	
1989	Gillian Roberts	Philly Stakes		Finalist	

==== 1990s ====
Agatha Award for Best Novel,1990-1999
Year	Author	Title	Publisher	Result	Ref.
1990	Nancy Pickard	Bum Steer	Pocket Books	Winner	
1990	Charlaine Harris	Real Murders		Finalist	
1990	Carolyn G. Hart	Deadly Valentine		Finalist	
1990	Anne Perry	The Face of a Stranger		Finalist	
1990	Ellis Peters	The Potter's Field		Finalist	
1991	Nancy Pickard	I.O.U.	Pocket Books	Winner	
1991	Aaron Elkins	Make No Bones	Mysterious Press	Finalist	
1991	Carolyn G. Hart	The Christie Caper	Bantam Books	Finalist	
1991	Charlotte MacLeod	An Owl Too Many	Mysterious Press	Finalist	
1991	Elizabeth Peters	The Last Camel Died at Noon	Warner	Finalist	
1992	Margaret Maron	Bootlegger's Daughter	Mysterious Press	Winner	
1992	Carolyn G. Hart	Southern Ghost		Finalist	
1992	Sharyn McCrumb	The Hangman's Beautiful Daughter		Finalist	
1992	Anne Perry	Defend and Betray		Finalist	
1992	Elizabeth Peters	The Snake, the Crocodile, and the Dog		Finalist	
1993	Carolyn Hart	Dead Man's Island	Bantam Books	Winner	
1993	Aaron Elkins	Old Scores		Finalist	
1993	Joan Hess	O Little Town of Maggody		Finalist	
1993	Kathy Hogan Trocheck	To Live and Die in Dixie		Finalist	
1993	Rochelle Majer Krich	Fair Game		Finalist	
1993	Margaret Maron	Southern Discomfort		Finalist	
1994	Sharyn McCrumb	She Walks These Hills	Scribner	Winner	
1994	Carolyn G. Hart	Scandal in Fair Haven		Finalist	
1994	Laurie R. King	The Beekeeper's Apprentice		Finalist	
1994	Rochelle Majer Krich	Angel of Death		Finalist	
1994	Elizabeth Peters	Night Train to Memphis		Finalist	
1995	Sharyn McCrumb	If I'd Killed Him When I Met Him	Ballantine Books	Winner	
1995	Joan Hess	Miracles in Maggody		Finalist	
1995	Sharan Newman	The Wandering Arm		Finalist	
1995	Nancy Pickard	Twilight		Finalist	
1995	Walter Satterthwait	Escapade		Finalist	
1996	Margaret Maron	Up Jumps the Devil	Mysterious Press	Winner	
1996	Earlene Fowler	Kansas Troubles	Berkley Books	Finalist	
1996	Sharan Newman	Strong as Death	Forge	Finalist	
1997	Kate Ross	The Devil In Music	Viking Press	Winner	
1997	Jan Burke	Hocus	Simon & Schuster	Finalist	
1997	Deborah Crombie	Dreaming of the Bones	Scribner	Finalist	
1997	Earlene Fowler	Goose in a Pond	Berkley Books	Finalist	
1997	Elizabeth Peters	Seeing a Large Cat	Warner	Finalist	
1998	Laura Lippman	Butchers Hill	Avon	Winner	
1998	Jan Burke	Liar	Simon & Schuster	Finalist	
1998	Earlene Fowler	Dove in the Window	Berkley	Finalist	
1998	Virginia Lanier	Blind Bloodhound Justice	HarperCollins	Finalist	
1998	Margaret Maron	Home Fires	Mysterious Press	Finalist	
1998	Elizabeth Peters	The Ape Who Guards the Balance	Avon	Finalist	
1999	Earlene Fowler	Mariner's Compass	Berkley Books	Winner	
1999	Jerrilyn Farmer	Immaculate Reception	Avon	Finalist	
1999	Carolyn Hart	Death on the River Walk	Avon	Finalist	
1999	Laura Lippman	In Big Trouble	Avon	Finalist	
1999	Sujata Massey	The Flower Master	HarperCollins	Finalist	

==== 2000s ====
Agatha Award for Best Novel, 2000-2009
Year	Author	Title	Publisher	Result	Ref.
2000	Margaret Maron	Storm Track	Mysterious Press	Winner	
2000	Taffy Cannon	Guns and Roses		Finalist	
2000	Jerrilyn Farmer	Killer Wedding		Finalist	
2000	Sujata Massey	The Floating Girl		Finalist	
2000	Elizabeth Peters	He Shall Thunder in the Sky		Finalist	
2001	Rhys Bowen	Murphy's Law	St. Martin's Minotaur	Winner	
2001	Earlene Fowler	Arkansas Traveler	Berkley Books	Finalist	
2001	Charlaine Harris	Dead Until Dark	Ace	Finalist	
2001	Rochelle Majer Krich	Shadows of Sin	Avon	Finalist	
2001	Sujata Massey	The Bride's Kimono	HarperCollins	Finalist	
2002	Donna Andrews	You've Got Murder	Berkley Prime Crime	Winner	
2002	Rhys Bowen	Death of Riley	St. Martin's Minotaur	Finalist	
2002	Katherine Hall Page	The Body in the Bonfire	Morrow	Finalist	
2002	Rochelle Majer Krich	Blues in the Night	Ballantine Books	Finalist	
2002	Elizabeth Peters	The Golden One	William Morrow & Company	Finalist	
2003	Carolyn Hart	Letter From Home	Berkley Prime Crime	Winner	
2003	Donna Andrews	Crouching Buzzard, Leaping Loon	St. Martin's Minotaur	Finalist	
2003	Jerrilyn Farmer	Mumbo Gumbo	William Morrow & Company	Finalist	
2003	Rochelle Majer Krich	Dream House	Ballantine Books	Finalist	
2003	Margaret Maron	Last Lessons of Summer	Mysterious Press	Finalist	
2003	Elaine Viets	Shop till You Drop	Signet	Finalist	
2004	Jacqueline Winspear	Birds of a Feather	Soho Press	Winner	
2004	Donna Andrews	We'll Always Have Parrots	Thomas Dunne Books	Finalist	
2004	Laura Lippman	By a Spider's Thread	HarperCollins	Finalist	
2004	Margaret Maron	High Country Fall	Mysterious Press	Finalist	
2004	Sujata Massey	The Pearl Diver	HarperCollins	Finalist	
2005	Katherine Hall Page	The Body in the Snowdrift	William Morrow & Company	Winner	
2005	Donna Andrews	Owls Well That Ends Well	St. Martin's Minotaur	Finalist	
2005	Margaret Maron	Rituals of the Season	Mysterious Press & Warner Books	Finalist	
2005	Pari Noskin Taichert	The Belen Hitch	University of New Mexico Press	Finalist	
2005	Heather Webber	Trouble in Spades	Avon/HarperCollins	Finalist	
2005	Jacqueline Winspear	Pardonable Lies	Henry Holt & Company	Finalist	
2006	Nancy Pickard	The Virgin of Small Plains	Random House	Winner	
2006	Earlene Fowler	The Saddlemaker's Wife		Finalist	
2006	L. C. Hayden	Why Casey Had to Die		Finalist	
2006	Nancy Pickard	The Virgin of Small Plains		Finalist	
2006	Julia Spencer-Fleming	All Mortal Flesh		Finalist	
2006	Jacqueline Winspear	Messenger of Truth		Finalist	
2007	Louise Penny	A Fatal Grace (Dead Cold in Canada)	St. Martin's Minotaur	Winner	
2007	Donna Andrews	The Penguin Who Knew Too Much	St. Martin's Minotaur	Finalist	
2007	Rhys Bowen	Her Royal Spyness	Penguin Group	Finalist	
2007	Margaret Maron	Hard Row	Grand Central Publishing	Finalist	
2007	Elaine Viets	Murder with Reservations	NAL	Finalist	
2008	Louise Penny	The Cruelest Month	Minotaur Books	Winner	
2008	Donna Andrews	Six Geese A-Slaying	Minotaur Books	Finalist	
2008	Rhys Bowen	A Royal Pain	Penguin Group	Finalist	
2008	Anne Perry	Buckingham Palace Gardens	Random House	Finalist	
2008	Julia Spencer-Fleming	I Shall Not Want	Minotaur Books	Finalist	
2009	Louise Penny	A Brutal Telling	Minotaur Books	Winner	
2009	Donna Andrews	Swan for the Money	St. Martin's Minotaur	Finalist	
2009	Lorna Barrett	Bookplate Special	Berkley Prime Crime	Finalist	
2009	Rhys Bowen	Royal Flush	Berkley Prime Crime	Finalist	
2009	Hank Phillippi Ryan	Air Time	MIRA	Finalist	

==== 2010s ====
Agatha Award for Best Novel, 2010-2019
Year	Author	Title	Result	Ref.
2010	Louise Penny	Bury Your Dead	Winner	
2010	Donna Andrews	Stork Raving Mad	Finalist	
2010	Nancy Pickard	The Scent of Rain and Lightning	Finalist	
2010	Hank Phillippi Ryan	Drive Time	Finalist	
2010	Heather Webber	Truly, Madly	Finalist	
2011	Margaret Maron	Three-Day Town	Winner	
2011	Donna Andrews	The Real Macaw	Finalist	
2011	Krista Davis	The Diva Haunts the House	Finalist	
2011	G. M. Malliet	Wicked Autumn	Finalist	
2011	Louise Penny	A Trick of the Light	Finalist	
2012	Louise Penny	The Beautiful Mystery	Winner	
2012	Krista Davis	The Diva Digs Up the Dirt	Finalist	
2012	G. M. Malliet	A Fatal Winter	Finalist	
2012	Margaret Maron	The Buzzard Table	Finalist	
2012	Hank Phillippi Ryan	The Other Woman	Finalist	

=== Best Historical Novel ===
==== 2010s ====
Agatha Award for Best Historical Novel, 2011-2019
Year	Author	Title	Series	Result	Ref.
2011	Rhys Bowen	Naughty in Nice	Royal Spyness	Winner	
2011	J. J. Murphy	Murder Your Darlings	Algonquin Round Table	Finalist	
2011	Ann Parker	Mercury's Rise	Silver Rush	Finalist	
2011	Jeri Westerson	Troubled Bones	Crispin Guest Mysteries	Finalist	
2011	Jacqueline Winspear	A Lesson in Secrets	Maisie Dobbs	Finalist	
2012	Catriona McPherson	Dandy Gilver and an Unsuitable Day for Murder	Dandy Gilver	Winner	
2012	Rhys Bowen	The Twelve Clues of Christmas	Royal Spyness	Finalist	
2012	Victoria Thompson	Murder on Fifth Avenue	Gaslight Mysteries	Finalist	
2012	Charles Todd	An Unmarked Grave	Bess Crawford	Finalist	
2012	Jacqueline Winspear	Elegy for Eddie	Maisie Dobbs	Finalist	
2013	Charles Todd	A Question of Honor	Bess Crawford	Winner	
2013	Rhys Bowen	Heirs and Graces	Royal Spyness	Finalist	
2013	Kaye George	Death in the Time of Ice	Enga Dancing Flower	Finalist	
2013	J. J. Murphy	A Friendly Game of Murder	Algonquin Round Table	Finalist	
2013	Victoria Thompson	Murder in Chelsea	Gaslight Mysteries	Finalist	
2014	Rhys Bowen	Queen of Hearts	Royal Spyness	Winner	
2014	DE Ireland	Wouldn't It Be Deadly	Eliza Doolittle and Henry Higgins	Finalist	
2014	Victoria Thompson	Murder in Murray Hill	Gaslight Mysteries	Finalist	
2014	Charles Todd	An Unwilling Accomplice	Bess Crawford	Finalist	
2014	Charles Todd	Hunting Shadows	Inspector Ian Rutledge	Finalist	
2015	Laurie R. King	Dreaming Spies	Mary Russell	Winner	
2015	Rhys Bowen	Malice at the Palace	Royal Spyness	Finalist	
2015	Susanna Calkins	The Masque of a Murderer	Lucy Campion	Finalist	
2015	Susan Elia MacNeal	Mrs. Roosevelt’s Confidante	Maggie Hope	Finalist	
2015	Victoria Thompson	Murder on Amsterdam Avenue	Gaslight Mysteries	Finalist	
2016	Catriona McPherson	The Reek of Red Herrings	Dandy Gilver	Winner	
2016	Jessica Estevao	Whispers Beyond the Veil	Change of Fortune	Finalist	
2016	D.E. Ireland	Get Me to the Grave on Time	Eliza Doolittle and Henry Higgins Mysteries	Finalist	
2016	Edith Maxwell	Delivering the Truth	Quaker Midwife	Finalist	
2016	Victoria Thompson	Murder in Morningside Heights	Gaslight Mysteries	Finalist	
2017	Rhys Bowen	In Farleigh Field		Winner	
2017	Jessica Ellicott	Murder in an English Village	Beryl and Edwina	Finalist	
2017	Susan Elia MacNeal	The Paris Spy	Maggie Hope	Finalist	
2017	Edith Maxwell	Called to Justice	Quaker Midwife	Finalist	
2017	Renee Patrick	Dangerous to Know	Lillian Frost and Edith Head	Finalist	
2018	Sujata Massey	The Widows of Malabar Hill	Perveen Mistry	Winner	
2018	Rhys Bowen	Four Funerals and Maybe a Wedding	Royal Spyness	Finalist	
2018	LA Chandlar	The Gold Pawn	Art Deco Mystery	Finalist	
2018	Edith Maxwell	Turning the Tide	Quaker Midwife	Finalist	
2018	Victoria Thompson	Murder on Union Square	Gaslight Mysteries	Finalist	
2019	Edith Maxwell	Charity’s Burden	Quaker Midwife	Winner	
2019	Rhys Bowen	Love and Death Among the Cheetahs	Royal Spyness	Finalist	
2019	Susanna Calkins	Murder Knocks Twice	Speakeasy Murders	Finalist	
2019	L. A. Chandlar	The Pearl Dagger	Art Deco Mystery	Finalist	
2019	Gabriel Valjan	The Naming Game	Company Files	Finalist	

==== 2020s ====
Agatha Award for Best Historical Novel, 2020-2029
Year	Author	Title	Series	Result	Ref.
2020	Rhys Bowen	The Last Mrs. Summers	Royal Spyness	Winner	
2020	Susanna Calkins	The Fate of a Flapper	Speakeasy Murders	Finalist	
2020	Dianne Freeman	A Lady's Guide to Mischief and Murder	Countess of Harleigh	Finalist	
2020	Edith Maxwell	Taken Too Soon	Quaker Midwife	Finalist	
2020	Catriona McPherson	The Turning Tide	Dandy Gilver	Finalist	
2021	Lori Rader-Day	Death at Greenway		Winner	
2021	Colleen Cambridge	Murder at Mallowan Hall	Phyllida Bright	Finalist	
2021	Naomi Hirahara	Clark and Division		Finalist	
2021	Sujata Massey	The Bombay Prince	Perveen Mistry	Finalist	
2021	Gabriel Valjan	The Devil's Music	Company Files series	Finalist	
2022	Amanda Flower	Because I Could Not Stop for Death	Emily Dickinson	Winner	
2022	Mally Becker	The Counterfeit Wife	A Revolutionary War Mystery	Finalist	
2022	Mariah Fredericks	The Lindbergh Nanny		Finalist	
2022	Catriona McPherson	In Place of Fear		Finalist	
2022	Karen Odden	Under a Veiled Moon	Inspector Corravan	Finalist	
2023	Sujata Massey	The Mistress of Bhatia House		Winner	
2023	Susanna Calkins	Death Among the Ruins		Finalist	
2023	Celeste Connally	Act Like a Lady, Think Like a Lord		Finalist	
2023	Amanda Flower	I Heard a Fly Buzz When I Died		Finalist	
2023	Cheryl A. Head	Time’s Undoing		Finalist	
2024	Amanda Flower	To Slip the Bonds of Earth		Winner	
2024	Mally Becker	The Paris Mistress		Finalist	
2024	John Copenhaver	Hall of Mirrors		Finalist	
2024	Mariah Frederick	The Wharton Plot		Finalist	
2024	Susan Elia MacNeal	The Last Hope		Finalist	
2025	Kelly Oliver	The Case of the Christie Conspiracy	Boldwood Books	Winner	
2025	Elizabeth Crowens	Bye Bye Blackbird	Level Best Books	Finalist	
2025	Mariah Fredericks	The Girl in the Green Dress	Minotaur Books	Finalist	
2025	Carol Pouliot	Murder at the Moulin Rouge	Level Best Books	Finalist	
2025	L.A. Chandlar	The Hindenburg Spy	Oliver Heber Publishers	Finalist	

=== Best Non-Fiction ===
==== 1990s ====
Agatha Award for Best Non-Fiction, 1993-1999
Year	Author	Title	Publisher	Result	Ref.
1993	Barbara D'Amato	The Doctor, the Murder, the Mystery	Noble Press	Winner	
1993	Michael C. Gerald	The Poisonous Pen of Agatha Christie		Finalist	
1993	Edward Gorman	The Fine Art of Murder		Finalist	
1993	Marvin Lachman	A Reader's Guide to the American Novel of Detection		Finalist	
1993	Ellen A. Nehr	The Doubleday Crime Club Compendium 1928-91		Finalist	
1993	Alzina Stone Dale	Dorothy L. Sayers		Finalist	
1994	Jean Swanson and Dean James	By a Woman's Hand	Berkley Publishing Group	Winner	
1994	William L. DeAndrea	Encyclopedia Mysteriosa		Finalist	
1994	Allen J. Hubin	Crime Fiction II		Finalist	
1994	Kathleen Gregory Klein	Great Women Mystery Writers		Finalist	
1994	Charlotte MacLeod	Had She But Known: Mary Roberts Rinehart		Finalist	
1995	Alzina Stone Dale	Mystery Readers Walking Guide-Chicago	Passport Books, NTC Publishing Group	Winner	
1995	Douglas G. Greene	John Dickson Carr: the Man Who Explained Miracles		Finalist	
1995	B.J. Rahn	Ngaio Marsh: the Woman and Her Work		Finalist	
1995	Kate Stine	The Armchair Detective Book of Lists, 2nd edition		Finalist	
1995	Robin Whiteman	The Cadfael Companion, 2nd edition		Finalist	
1996	Willetta L. Heising	Detecting Women 2	Purple Moon Press	Winner	
1996	Ron Miller	Mystery: A Celebration	KQED Books	Finalist	
1996	Elaine Raco Chase and Anne Wingate	Amateur Detectives: A Writer's Guide to How Private Citizens Solve Criminal Cases	Writer's Digest	Finalist	
1996	Barbara Reynolds (editor)	The Letters of Dorothy L. Sayers: The Making of a Detective Novelist	St. Martin's Minotaur	Finalist	
1996	Jean Swanson and Dean James	By a Woman's Hand, 2nd Edition	Berkley Publishing Group	Finalist	
1997	Willeta L. Heising	Detecting Men	Purple Moon Press	Winner	
1997	Nina King and Robin Winks	Crimes of the Scene	St. Martin's Press	Finalist	
1997	Ian Ousby	Guilty Parties	Thames & Hudson	Finalist	
1998	Alzina Stone Dale	Mystery Reader's Walking Guide to Washington D.C.	Passport Books	Winner	
1998	Edward Gorman and Martin H. Greenberg	Speaking of Murder	Berkley	Finalist	
1998	Jan Grape	Dean James and Ellen Nehr, Deadly Women	Carroll & Graf Publishers	Finalist	
1998	Victoria Nichols and Susan Thompson	Silk Stalkings II	Scarecrow	Finalist	
1998	Jean Swanson and Dean James	Killer Books	Berkley	Finalist	
1999	Daniel Stashower	Teller of Tales: the Life of Arthur Conan Doyle	Henry Holt & Company	Winner	
1999	Kate Derie	The Deadly Directory	Deadly Serious Press	Finalist	
1999	Jo Grossman and Robert Weibezahl	A Taste of Murder: Diabolically Delicious Recipes from Contemporary Mystery Writers	Poisoned Pen Press	Finalist	
1999	Willetta L. Heising	Detecting Women III	Purple Moon Press	Finalist	
1999	Rosemary Herbert	The Oxford Companion to Crime and Mystery Writing	Oxford University Press	Finalist	

==== 2000s ====
Agatha Award for Best Non-Fiction, 2000-2009
Year	Author	Title	Publisher	Result	Ref.
2000	Jim Huang (editor)	100 Favorite Mysteries of the Century	Crum Creek Press	Winner	
2000	Matthew Bunson	The Complete Christie	Pocket Books	Finalist	
2000	Martha Dubose (editor)	Women of Mystery		Finalist	
2000	Marvin Lachman (editor)	The American Regional Mystery		Finalist	
2000	Helen Windrath (editor)	They Wrote the Book		Finalist	
2001	Tony Hillerman	Seldom Disappointed: A Memoir	HarperCollins	Winner	
2001	Max Allan Collins	The History of the Mystery	Collector's Press	Finalist	
2001	G. Miki Hayden	Writing the Mystery: A Start-To-Finish Guide for Both Novice and Professional	Intrigue Press	Finalist	
2001	Jeffrey Marks	Who Was That Lady?	Delphi Books	Finalist	
2001	The Sisters Wells	Food, Drink, and the Female Sleuth	Authors Choice Press/iUniverse.com	Finalist	
2002	Jim Huang (editor)	They Died in Vain: Overlooked, Underappreciated, and Forgotten Mystery Novels	Crum Creek Press	Winner	
2002	Mike Ashley (editor)	The Mammoth Encyclopedia of Modern Crime Fiction	Avalon Publishing Group	Finalist	
2002	Colleen Barnett	Mystery Women: An Encyclopedia of Leading Women Characters in Mystery Fiction	Poisoned Pen Press	Finalist	
2002	Sue Grafton (editor) with Jan Burke and Barry Zeman	Writing Mysteries: A Handbook by the Mystery Writers of America	Writer's Digest	Finalist	
2002	Mary Higgins Clark	Kitchen Privileges: A Memoir	Simon and Schuster	Finalist	
2003	Elizabeth Peters and Kristen Whitbread (editors) with Dennis Forbes (design)	Amelia Peabody's Egypt: A Compendium	William Morrow & Company	Winner	
2003	Colleen A. Barnett	Mystery Women: An Encyclopedia of Leading Women Characters in Mystery Fiction, Volume 3 (Parts 1 & 2)	Poisoned Pen Press	Finalist	
2003	Jo Grossman and Robert Weibezahl (editors)	A Second Helping of Murder: More Diabolically Delicious Recipes from Contemporary Mystery Writers	Poisoned Pen Press	Finalist	
2003	Jeffrey Marks	Atomic Renaissance: Women Mystery Writers of the 1940s and 1950s	Delphi Books	Finalist	
2004	Jack French	Private Eye-Lashes: Radio’s Lady Detectives	Bear Manor Media	Winner	
2004	Leslie Klinger (editor)	The New Annotated Sherlock Holmes: The Complete Short Stories	W. W. Norton & Company	Finalist	
2005	Melanie Rehak	Girl Sleuth: Nancy Drew and the Women Who Created Her	Harcourt	Winner	
2005	Stuart Kaminsky	Behind the Mystery: Top Mystery Writers	Hothouse Press	Finalist	
2005	Leslie S. Klinger	The New Annotated Sherlock Holmes	W. W. Norton	Finalist	
2005	Marvin Lachman	The Heirs of Anthony Boucher	Poisoned Pen Press	Finalist	
2006	Chris Roerden	Don't Murder Your Mystery	Bella Rosa Books	Winner	
2006	Jim Huang and Austin Lugar	Mystery Muses	The Crum Creek Press	Finalist	
2006	Daniel Stashower	The Beautiful Cigar Girl	Dutton	Finalist	
2007	Jon Lellenberg, Daniel Stashower, and Charles Foley	Arthur Conan Doyle: A Life in Letters	Penguin Press	Winner	
2007	Penny Warner	The Official Nancy Drew Handbook	Quirck Productions	Finalist	
2008	Kathy Lynn Emerson	How to Write Killer Historical Mysteries	Perseverance Press	Winner	
2008	Frankie Y. Bailey	African American Mystery Writers: A Historical & Thematic Study	McFarland & Co.	Finalist	
2008	Jeffrey Marks	Anthony Boucher: A Biobibliography	McFarland & Co.	Finalist	
2008	Dr. Harry Lee Poe	Edgar Allan Poe: An Illustrated Companion to His Tell-Tale Stories	Metro Books	Finalist	
2008	Kate Summerscale	The Suspicions of Mr. Whitcher, or The Murder at Road Hill House	Walker & Co.	Finalist	
2009	Elena Santangelo	Dame Agatha's Shorts	Bella Rosa Books	Winner	
2009	Richard Hack	Duchess of Death	Phoenix Books	Finalist	
2009	P. D. James	Talking About Detective Fiction	Knopf	Finalist	
2009	Amnon Kabatchnik	Blood on the Stage 1925-1950	Scarecrow Press	Finalist	
2009	Joan Schenkar	The Talented Miss Highsmith	St Martin's Press	Finalist	

==== 2010s ====
Agatha Award for Best Non-Fiction, 2010-2019
Year	Author	Title	Result	Ref.
2010	John Curran	Agatha Christie's Secret Notebooks: 50 Years of Mysteries in the Making	Winner	
2010	Deborah Blum	The Poisoner's Handbook: Murder and the Birth of Forensic Medicine in Jazz Age New York	Finalist	
2010	Stephen Doyle and David A. Crowder	Sherlock Holmes for Dummies	Finalist	
2010	Katherine Hall Page	Have Faith in Your Kitchen	Finalist	
2010	Yunte Huang	Charlie Chan: The Untold Story of the Honorable Detective and His Rendezvous with American History	Finalist	
2011	Leslie Budewitz	Books, Crooks and Counselors: How to Write Accurately About Criminal Law and Courtroom Procedure	Winner	
2011	John Curran	Agatha Christie: Murder in the Making: More Stories and Secrets from Her Notebooks	Finalist	
2011	Michael Dirda	On Conan Doyle; or The Whole Art of Storytelling	Finalist	
2011	A. B. Emrys	Wilkie Collins, Vera Caspary and the Evolution of the Casebook Novel	Finalist	
2011	Charlaine Harris	The Sookie Stackhouse Companion	Finalist	
2012	John Connolly	Books to Die For: The World's Greatest Mystery Writers on the World's Greatest Mystery Novels	Winner	
2012	Joseph Goodrich	Blood Relations: The Selected Letters of Ellery Queen, 1947-1950	Finalist	
2012	D. P. Lyle	More Forensics and Fiction: Crime Writers Morbidly Curious Questions Expertly Answered	Finalist	
2012	Ben Macintyre	Double Cross: The True Story of the D-Day Spies	Finalist	
2012	Mathew Prichard	The Grand Tour: Around the World with the Queen of Mystery Agatha Christie	Finalist	
2013	Daniel Stashower	The Hour of Peril: The Secret Plot to Murder Lincoln Before the Civil War	Winner	
2013	Jennifer Kloester	Georgette Heyer	Finalist	
2013	Maria Konnikova	Mastermind: How to Think Like Sherlock Holmes	Finalist	
2013	Verena Rose and Rita Owen	Editors, Not Everyone's Cup of Tea: An Interesting & Entertaining History of Malice Domestic's First 25 Years	Finalist	
2014	Hank Phillippi Ryan (editor)	Writes of Passage: Adventures on the Writer's Journey	Winner	
2014	Stephen Bates	The Poisoner: The Life and Crimes of Victorian England's Most Notorious Doctor	Finalist	
2014	Kate Flora	Death Dealer: How Cops and Cadaver Dogs Brought a Killer to Justice	Finalist	
2014	Adam Plantinga	400 Things Cops Know: Street Smart Lessons from a Veteran Patrolman	Finalist	
2014	Lucy Worsley	The Art of the English Murder	Finalist	
2015	Martin Edwards	The Golden Age of Murder: The Mystery of the Writers Who Invented the Modern Detective Story	Winner	
2015	Zack Dundas	The Great Detective: The Amazing Rise and Immortal Life of Sherlock Holmes	Finalist	
2015	Kathryn Harkup	A is for Arsenic: The Poisons of Agatha Christie	Finalist	
2015	Jane Ann Turzillo	Unsolved Murders and Disappearances in Northeast Ohio	Finalist	
2015	Kate White (editor), Mystery Writers of America	The Mystery Writers of America Cookbook: Wickedly Good Meals and Desserts to Die For	Finalist	
2016	Jane K. Cleland	Mastering Suspense, Structure, and Plot: How to Write Gripping Stories that Keep Readers on the Edge of Their Seats	Winner	
2016	Roger Guay with Kate Clark Flora	A Good Man with a Dog: A Game Warden's 25 Years in the Maine Woods	Finalist	
2016	Margaret Kinsman	Sara Paretsky: A Companion to the Mystery Fiction	Finalist	
2017	Mattias Bostrom	From Holmes to Sherlock: The Story of the Men and Women Who Created an Icon	Winner	
2017	Tatiana de Rosnay	Manderley Forever: A Biography of Daphne du Maurier	Finalist	
2017	Martin Edwards	The Story of Classic Crime in 100 Books	Finalist	
2017	Monica Hesse	American Fire: Love, Arson and Life in a Vanishing Land	Finalist	
2017	Jess Lourey	Through the Healing Power of Fiction	Finalist	
2018	Jane Cleland	Mastering Plot Twists	Winner	
2018	Nancy J. Cohen	Writing the Cozy Mystery	Finalist	
2018	Margalit Fox	Conan Doyle for the Defense	Finalist	
2018	Laura Thompson	Agatha Christie: A Mysterious Life	Finalist	
2018	Jane Ann Turzillo	Wicked Women of Ohio	Finalist	
2019	Mo Moulton	The Mutual Admiration Society: How Dorothy L. Sayers and her Oxford Circle Remade the World for Women	Winner	
2019	Laird R. Blackwell	Frederic Dannay, Ellery Queen’s Mystery Magazine and the Art of the Detective Short Story	Finalist	
2019	Julia Bricklin	Blonde Rattlesnake: Burmah Adams, Tom White, and the 1933 Crime Spree that Terrified Los Angeles	Finalist	
2019	Casey Cep	Furious Hours: Murder, Fraud and the Last Trial of Harper Lee	Finalist	
2019	Hallie Rubenhold	The Five: The Untold Lives of the Women Killed by Jack the Ripper	Finalist	

==== 2020s ====
Agatha Award for Best Non-Fiction, 2020-2029
Year	Author	Title	Result	Ref.
2020	Christina Lane	Phantom Lady: Hollywood Producer Joan Harrison, the Forgotten Woman Behind Hitchcock	Winner	
2020	Leslie Brody	Sometimes You Have to Lie: The Life and Times of Louise Fitzhugh, Renegade Author of Harriet the Spy	Finalist	
2020	Martin Edwards	Howdunit: A Masterclass in Crime Writing by Members of the Detection Club	Finalist	
2020	Sheila Mitchell	H.R.F. Keating: A Life of Crime	Finalist	
2020	Kate Winkler Dawson	American Sherlock: Murder, Forensics, and the Birth of American CSI	Finalist	
2021	Lee Child and Laurie R. King (editor)	How to Write a Mystery: A Handbook from Mystery Writers of America	Winner	
2021	Jan Brogan	The Combat Zone: Murder, Race, and Boston’s Struggle for Justice	Finalist	
2021	Chris Chan	Murder Most Grotesque: The Comedic Crime Fiction of Joyce Porter	Finalist	
2021	Julie Kavanaugh	The Irish Assassins: Conspiracy, Revenge, and the Phoenix Park Murders that Stunned Victorian England	Finalist	
2022	Diane Vallere	Promophobia: Taking the Mystery Out of Promoting Crime Fiction	Winner	
2022	Martin Edwards	The Life of Crime: Detecting the History of Mysteries and Their Creators	Finalist	
2022	Mary Anna Evans and J. C. Bernthal	The Bloomsbury Handbook to Agatha Christie	Finalist	
2022	Carla Valentine	Summary of the Science of Murder: The Forensics of Agatha Christie	Finalist	
2023	Anjili Babbar	Finders: Justice, Faith and Identity in Irish Crime Fiction	Winner	
2023	David Bordwell	Perplexing Plots: Popular Storytelling and the Poetics of Murder	Finalist	
2023	Mark Dawidziak	A Mystery of Mysteries: The Death and Life of Edgar Allan Poe	Finalist	
2023	Robert Morgan	Fallen Angel: The Life of Edgar Allan Poe	Finalist	
2024	Phyllis M. Betz	Writing the Cozy Mystery: Authors' Perspectives on Their Craft	Winner	
2024	Mark Aldridge	Agatha Christie, Marple: Expert on Wickedness	Finalist	
2024	Chris Chan	Some of My Best Friends are Murderers: Critiquing the Columbo Killers	Finalist	
2024	Evan Friss	The Bookshop: A History of the American Bookstore	Finalist	
2024	Greg Lilly	Abingdon's Boardinghouse Murder	Finalist	
2025	Dawn M. Barclay	Vacations Can Be Murder: A True Crime Lover's Travel Guide to New England	Winner	
2025	Gilbert King	Bone Valley	Finalist	
2025	Hallie Rubenhold	Story of a Murder: The Wives, the Mistress, and Dr. Crippen	Finalist	
2025	Winkler Dawson	The Sinners All Bow: Two Authors, One Murder, and the Real Hester Prynne	Finalist	

=== Best Short Story ===
==== 1980s ====
Agatha Award for Best Short Story, 1988-1989
Year	Author	Title	Publication	Result	Ref.
1988	Robert Barnard	More Final Than Divorce	Ellery Queen's Mystery Magazine	Winner	
1989	Sharyn McCrumb	A Wee Doch And Doris	Mistletoe Mysteries (Mysterious Press)	Winner	

==== 1990s ====
Agatha Award for Best Short Story, 1990-1999
Year	Author	Title	Publication	Result	Ref.
1990	Joan Hess	Too Much To Bare	Sisters in Crime 2 (Berkley Publishing Group)	Winner	
1991	Margaret Maron	Deborah's Judgment	A Woman's Eye (Delacourte Press)	Winner	
1992	Aaron Elkins and Charlotte Elkins	Nice Gorilla	Malice Domestic 1 (Pocket Books)	Winner	
1993	M.D. Lake	Kim's Game	Malice Domestic 2 (Pocket Books)	Winner	
1994	Dorothy Cannell	The Family Jewels	Malice Domestic 3 (Pocket Books)	Winner	
1995	Elizabeth Daniels Squire	The Dog Who Remembered Too Much	Malice Domestic 4 (Pocket Books)	Winner	
1996	Carolyn Wheat	Accidents Will Happen	Malice Domestic 5 (Pocket Books)	Winner	
1997	M.D. Lake	Tea for Two	Funnybones (Penguin Group)	Winner	
1998	Barbara D'Amato	Of Course You Know That Chocolate Is A Vegetable	Ellery Queen's Mystery Magazine, November 1998	Winner	
1999	Nancy Pickard	Out of Africa	Mom, Apple Pie, and Murder (Berkley Publishing Group)	Winner	

==== 2000s ====
Agatha Award for Best Short Story, 2000-2009
Year	Author	Title	Publication	Result	Ref.
2000	Jan Burke	The Man in the Civil Suit	Malice Domestic 9 (Avon Books)	Winner	
2001	Katherine Hall Page	The Would-Be-Widower	Malice Domestic X (Avon Books)	Winner	
2002	Margaret Maron	The Dog That Didn't Bark	Ellery Queen's Mystery Magazine, December 2002	Winner	
2002	Marcia Talley	Too Many Cooks	Much Ado About Murder, edited by Anne Perry (Berkley Prime Crime)	Winner	
2003	Elizabeth Foxwell	No Man’s Land	Blood On Their Hands (Berkley Prime Crime)	Winner	
2004	Elaine Viets	Wedding Knife	Chesapeake Crimes, edited by Donna Andrews (Quiet Storm Publishing)	Winner	
2005	Marcia Talley	Driven to Distraction	Chesapeake Crimes II (Quiet Storm Publishing)	Winner	
2006	Toni Kelner	Sleeping with the Plush	Alfred Hitchcock's Mystery Magazine	Winner	
2007	Donna Andrews	A Rat's Tale	Ellery Queen Mystery Magazine	Winner	
2008	Dana Cameron	The Night Things Changed	Wolfsbane & Mistletoe (Penguin Group)	Winner	
2009	Hank Phillippi Ryan	On the House	Level Best Books	Winner	

==== 2010s ====
Agatha Award for Best Short Story, 2010-2019
Year	Author	Title	Publication	Result	Ref.
2010	Mary Jane Maffini	So Much in Common	Ellery Queen's Mystery Magazine, Sept./Oct. 2010	Winner	
2010	Dana Cameron	Swing Shift	Crimes by Moonlight: Mysteries from the Dark Side (Berkley)	Finalist	
2010	Sheila Connolly	Size Matters	Thin Ice: Crime Stories by New England Writers (Level Best Books)	Finalist	
2010	Barb Goffman	Volunteer of the Year	Chesapeake Crimes: They Had it Comin' (Wildside Press)	Finalist	
2010	Elizabeth Zelvin	The Green Cross	Ellery Queen's Mystery Magazine, Aug. 2010	Finalist	
2011	Dana Cameron	Disarming	Ellery Queen's Mystery Magazine, June 2011	Winner	
2011	Krista Davis	Dead Eye Gravy	Fish Tales: The Guppy Anthology (Wildside Press)	Finalist	
2011	Barb Goffman	Truth and Consequences	Mystery Times Ten (Buddhapuss Ink)	Finalist	
2011	Roberta Isleib	The Itinerary	Mystery Writers of America Presents the Rich and the Dead (Grand Central Publishing)	Finalist	
2011	Daryl Wood Gerber	Palace by the Lake	Fish Tales: The Guppy Anthology (Wildside Press)	Finalist	
2012	Dana Cameron	Mischief in Mesopotamia	Ellery Queen's Mystery Magazine, Nov. 2012	Winner	
2012	Sheila Connolly	Kept in the Dark	Best New England Crime Stories 2013: Blood Moon (Level Best Books)	Finalist	
2012	Barb Goffman	The Lord is My Shamus	Chesapeake Crimes: This Job is Murder (Wildside Press)	Finalist	
2012	B.K. Stevens	Thea's First Husband	Alfred Hitchcock's Mystery Magazine, June 2012	Finalist	
2012	Art Taylor	When Duty Calls	Chesapeake Crimes: This Job is Murder (Wildside Press)	Finalist	
2013	Art Taylor	The Care and Feeding of House Plants	Ellery Queen's Mystery Magazine, March/April 2013	Winner	
2013	Barb Goffman	Evil Little Girl	Don't Get Mad, Get Even (Wildside Press)	Finalist	
2013	Barb Goffman	Nightmare	Don't Get Mad, Get Even (Wildside Press)	Finalist	
2013	Gigi Pandian	The Hindi Houdini	Fish Nets: The Second Guppy Anthology (Wildside Press)	Finalist	
2013	Barbara Ross	Bread Baby	Best New England Crime Stories 2014: Stone Cold (Level Best Books)	Finalist	
2014	Art Taylor	The Odds Are Against Us	Ellery Queen's Mystery Magazine, Nov. 2014	Winner	
2014	Kathy Lynn Emerson	The Blessing Witch	Best New England Crime Stories 2015: Rogue Wave (Level Best Books)	Finalist	
2014	Barb Goffman	The Shadow Knows	Chesapeake Crimes: Homicidal Holidays (Wildside Press)	Finalist	
2014	Edith Maxwell	Just Desserts for Johnny		Finalist	
2014	Art Taylor	Premonition	Chesapeake Crimes: Homicidal Holidays (Wildside Press)	Finalist	
2015	Barb Goffman	A Year Without Santa Claus?	Alfred Hitchcock's Mystery Magazine, Jan./Feb. 2015	Winner	
2015	Terrie Farley Moran	A Killing at the Beausoleil	Ellery Queen's Mystery Magazine, Nov. 2015	Finalist	
2015	Edith Maxwell	A Questionable Death	History & Mystery, Oh My (Mystery & Horror, LLC)	Finalist	
2015	Harriette Sackler	Suffer the Poor	History & Mystery, Oh My (Mystery & Horror, LLC)	Finalist	
2015	B.K. Stevens	A Joy Forever	Alfred Hitchcock's Mystery Magazine, March 2015	Finalist	
2016	Art Taylor	Parallel Play	Chesapeake Crimes: Storm Warning (Wildside Press)	Winner	
2016	Gretchen Archer	Double Jinx: A Bellissimo Casino Crime Caper Short Story	Henery Press	Finalist	
2016	Barb Goffman	The Best-Laid Plans	Malice Domestic 11: Murder Most Conventional (Wildside Press)	Finalist	
2016	Edith Maxwell	The Mayor and the Midwife	Blood on the Bayou: Bouchercon Anthology 2016 (Down & Out Books)	Finalist	
2016	B.K. Stevens	The Last Blue Glass	Alfred Hitchcock's Mystery Magazine, April 2016	Finalist	
2017	Gigi Pandian	The Library Ghost of Tanglewood Inn		Winner	
2017	Gretchen Archer	Double Deck the Halls	Henery Press	Finalist	
2017	Barb Goffman	Whose Wine Is It Anyway?	50 Shades of Cabernet	Finalist	
2017	Debra H. Goldstein	The Night They Burned Miss Dixie's Place	Alfred Hitchcock's Mystery Magazine, May/June 2017	Finalist	
2017	Art Taylor	A Necessary Ingredient	Coast to Coast: Private Eyes from Sea to Shining Sea (Down & Out Books)	Finalist	
2018	Leslie Budewitz	All God's Sparrows	Alfred Hitchcock's Mystery Magazine, May/June 2018	Winner	
2018	Tara Laskowski [fr]	The Case of the Vanishing Professor	Alfred Hitchcock's Mystery Magazine, May/June 2018	Winner	
2018	Susanna Calkins	A Postcard for the Dead	Florida Happens: Tales of Mystery, Mayhem, and Suspense from the Sunshine State (Three Rooms Press)	Finalist	
2018	Barb Goffman	Bug Appétit	Ellery Queen's Mystery Magazine, November/December 2018	Finalist	
2018	Art Taylor	English 398: Fiction Workshop	Ellery Queen's Mystery Magazine, July/August 2018	Finalist	
2019	Shawn Reilly Simmons	The Last Word	Malice Domestic 14: Mystery Most Edible	Winner	
2019	Kaye George	Grist for the Mill	A Murder of Crows (Darkhouse Books)	Finalist	
2019	Barb Goffman	Alex’s Choice	Crime Travel (Wildside Press)	Finalist	
2019	Cynthia Kuhn	The Blue Ribbon	Malice Domestic 14: Mystery Most Edible (Wildside Press)	Finalist	
2019	Art Taylor	Better Days	Ellery Queen's Mystery Magazine, May/June 2019	Finalist	

==== 2020s ====
Agatha Award for Best Short Story, 2020-2029
Year	Author	Title	Publication	Result	Ref.
2020	Barb Goffman	Dear Emily Etiquette	Ellery Queen's Mystery Magazine, September/October 2020	Winner	
2020	Shawn Reilly Simmons	The Red Herrings at Killington Inn	Masthead: Best New England Crime Stories	Finalist	
2020	Art Taylor	The Boy Detective & the Summer of '74	Alfred Hitchcock's Mystery Magazine, January/February 2020	Finalist	
2020	Gabriel Valjan	Elysian Fields	California Schemin': the 2020 Bouchercon Anthology (Wildside Press)	Finalist	
2020	James Ziskin	The 25 Year Engagement	In League with Sherlock Holmes: Stories Inspired by the Sherlock Holmes Canon (Pegasus Crime)	Finalist	
2021	Shawn Reilly Simmons	Bay of Reckoning	Murder on the Beach (Destination Murders)	Winner	
2021	Barb Goffman	A Family Matter	Alfred Hitchcock's Mystery Magazine, January/February 2021	Finalist	
2021	Barb Goffman	A Tale of Two Sisters	Murder on the Beach (Destination Murders)	Finalist	
2021	Richie Narvaez	Doc's at Midnight	Midnight Hour	Finalist	
2021	Gigi Pandian	The Locked Room Library	Ellery Queen's Mystery Magazine, July/August 2021	Finalist	
2022	Barb Goffman	Beauty and the Beyotch	Sherlock Holmes Mystery Magazine, Issue 29	Winner	
2022	Cynthia Kuhn	There Comes a Time	Malice Domestic: Mystery Most Diabolical	Finalist	
2022	Lisa Q. Mathews	Fly Me to the Morgue	Malice Domestic: Mystery Most Diabolical	Finalist	
2022	Richie Narvaez	The Minnesota Twins Meet Bigfoot	Land of 10,000 Thrills: Bouchercon Anthology 2022	Finalist	
2022	Art Taylor	The Invisible Band	Edgar & Shamus Go Golden	Finalist	
2023	Dru Ann Love and Kristopher Zgorski	Ticket to Ride	Happiness Is a Warm Gun: Crime Fiction Inspired by the Songs of The Beatles	Winner	
2023	Shelley Costa	The Knife Sharpener	Alfred Hitchcock’s Mystery Magazine, July/August 2023	Finalist	
2023	Tina deBellegarde	A Good Judge of Character	Malice Domestic 17: Murder Most Traditional	Finalist	
2023	Barb Goffman	Real Courage	Black Cat Mystery Magazine, October 2023	Finalist	
2023	Richie Narvaez	Shamu, World’s Greatest Detective	Killin’ Time in San Diego	Finalist	
2024	Barb Goffman	"A Matter of Trust"	Three Strikes—You're Dead	Winner	
2024	Barb Goffman	"The Postman Always Flirts Twice"	Agatha and Derringer Get Cozy	Finalist	
2024	Kerry Hammond	"Sins of the Father"	Mystery Most International	Finalist	
2024	Gabriel Valjan	"Satan's Spit"	Tales of Music, Murder and Mayhem: Bouchercon Anthology 2024	Finalist	
2024	Kristopher Zgorski	"Reynisjara"	Mystery Most International	Finalist	
2025	Ashley-Ruth Bernier	"Six-Armed Robbery"	Malice Domestic Mystery Most Humorous	Winner	
2025	Barb Goffman	"Baby Love"	Double Crossing Van Dine	Finalist	
2025	Nikki Knight	"Boss Cat Rules"	Malice Domestic Mystery Most Humerous	Finalist	
2025	Kerry Hammond	"Lola's Last Dance"	Celluloid Crimes	Finalist	
2025	Edith Maxwell	"While the Iron is Hot"	Ellery Queen Mystery Magazine, Mar/Apr 2025	Finalist	

=== Best Children/Young Adult Fiction ===
==== 2000s ====
Agatha Award for Best Children/Young Adult Fiction, 2000-2009
Year	Author	Title	Publisher	Result	Ref.
2001	Penny Warner	Mystery Of The Haunted Caves (Troop 13 Mystery series)	Meadowbrook Press	Winner	
2002	Daniel J. Hale and Matthew LaBrot	Red Card (The Zeke Armstrong Mysteries)	Top Publications	Winner	
2003	Kathleen Karr	The 7th Knot	Marshall Cavendish	Winner	
2004	Blue Balliett	Chasing Vermeer	Scholastic Press	Winner	
2005	Peter Abrahams	Down the Rabbit Hole	HarperCollins	Winner	
2005	Carl Hiaasen	Flush	Alfred A. Knopf	Winner	
2006	Nancy Means Wright	Pea Soup Poisonings	Hilliard & Harris	Winner	
2007	Sarah Masters Buckey	A Light In The Cellar	American Girl	Winner	
2008	Chris Grabenstein	The Crossroads		Winner	
2009	Chris Grabenstein	The Hanging Hill	Random House	Winner	
2009	John C. Ford	The Morgue and Me		Finalist	
2009	Lewis B. Montgomery	The Case of the Poisoned Pig		Finalist	
2009	Valerie O. Patterson	The Other Side of Blue		Finalist	
2009	Nancy Springer	'The Case of the Cryptic Crinoline'		Finalist	

==== 2010s ====
Agatha Award for Best Children/Young Adult Fiction, 2010-2019
Year	Author	Title	Publisher	Result	Ref.
2010	Sarah Smith	The Other Side of Dark	Atheneum Books	Winner	
2010	John Grisham	Theodore Boone: Kid Lawyer	Dutton Children's	Finalist	
2010	R. L. LaFevers	Theodosia and the Eyes of Horus	Houghton Mifflin	Finalist	
2010	Y. S. Lee	The Agency: A Spy in the House	Candlewick Press	Finalist	
2010	Kathy Reichs	Virals	Razorbill	Finalist	
2011	Chris Grabenstein	The Black Heart Crypt	Random House	Winner	
2011	Harlan Coben	Shelter	Putnam	Finalist	
2011	Matthew J. Kirby	Icefall	Scholastic Press	Finalist	
2011	Shawn Thomas Odyssey	The Wizard of Dark Street	EgmontUSA	Finalist	
2011	Penny Warner	The Secret of the Skeleton Key (The Code Busters Club)	EgmontUSA	Finalist	
2012	Penny Warner	The Haunted Lighthouse (The Code Busters Club)	EgmontUSA	Winner	
2012	Harlan Coben	Seconds Away		Finalist	
2012	Elizabeth George	The Edge of Nowhere		Finalist	
2012	Rebecca Stead	Liar & Spy		Finalist	
2012	Elizabeth Wein	Code Name Verity		Finalist	
2013	Chris Grabenstein	Escape from Mr. Lemoncello's Library	Random House	Winner	
2013	Joelle Charbonneau	The Testing	HMH Books for Young Readers	Finalist	
2013	Kathleen Ernst	Traitor in the Shipyard: A Caroline Mystery	American Girl	Finalist	
2013	Amanda Flower	Andi Unexpected	Zonderkidz	Finalist	
2013	Penny Warner	Mystery of the Pirate's Treasure (The Code Busters Club)	EgmontUSA	Finalist	
2014	Penny Warner	The Mummy's Curse (The Code Busters Club)	EgmontUSA	Winner	
2014	Harlan Coben	Found	Putnam Juvenile	Finalist	
2014	Amanda Flower	Andi Under Pressure	ZonderKidz	Finalist	
2014	Kate Milford	Greenglass House	Clarion Books	Finalist	
2014	Lea Wait	Uncertain Glory	Islandport Press	Finalist	
2015	Amanda Flower	Andi Unstoppable	Zonderkidz	Winner	
2015	Blue Balliett	Pieces and Players	Scholastic Press	Finalist	
2015	Joelle Charbonneau	Need	HMH Books for Young Readers	Finalist	
2015	Spencer Quinn	Woof	Scholastic Press	Finalist	
2015	B.K. Stevens	Fighting Chance	Poisoned Pen Press	Finalist	
2016	Penny Warner	The Secret of the Puzzle Box(The Code Busters Club)	Darby Creek	Winner	
2016	P.A. DeVoe	Trapped (A Mei-hua Adventure)	Drum Tower Press	Finalist	
2016	Stuart Gibbs	Spy Ski School	Simon & Schuster	Finalist	
2016	J C Lane	Tag, You're Dead	Poisoned Pen Press	Finalist	
2016	Rebecca Podos	The Mystery of Hollow Places	Balzer & Bray	Finalist	
2017	Cindy Callaghan	Sydney Mackenzie Knocks 'Em Dead	Aladdin	Winner	
2017	Kristi Belcamino	City of Angels		Finalist	
2017	Caroline Carlson	The World's Greatest Detective		Finalist	
2017	Kirby Larson	Audacity Jones Steals the Show		Finalist	
2017	Natasha Tarpley	The Harlem Charade		Finalist	
2018	Cindy Callaghan	Potion Problems (Just Add Magic)		Winner	
2018	Ben Guterson	Winterhouse		Finalist	
2018	C. M. Surrisi	A Side of Sabotage		Finalist	
2019	Frances Schoonmaker	The Last Crystal	Auctus Press	Winner	
2019	Shauna Holyoak	Kazu Jones and the Denver Dognappers	Disney Hyperion	Finalist	
2019	Karen MacManus	Two Can Keep a Secret	Delacorte Press	Finalist	
2019	Robin Stevens	Top Marks for Murder	Puffin	Finalist	
2019	Sherri Winston	Jada Sly, Artist and Spy	Little Brown Books for Young Readers	Finalist	

==== 2020s ====
Agatha Award for Best Children/Young Adult Fiction, 2020-2029
Year	Author	Title	Publisher	Result	Ref.
2020	Richie Narvaez	Holly Hernandez and the Death of Disco	Piñata Books	Winner	
2020	Fleur Bradley	Midnight at the Barclay Hotel	Viking Books for Young Readers	Finalist	
2020	Elizabeth C. Bunce	Premeditated Myrtle	Algonquin Young Readers	Finalist	
2020	Cindy Callaghan	Saltwater Secrets	AladdinQ	Finalist	
2020	Janae Marks	From the Desk of Zoe Washington	Katherin Teagen Books	Finalist	
2021	Alan Orloff	I Play One on TV	Down & Out Books	Winner	
2021	Elizabeth C. Bunce	Cold-Blooded Myrtle	Algonquin Young Readers	Finalist	
2021	June Hur	The Forest of Stolen Girls	Fiewel and Friends	Finalist	
2021	Lynn Slaughter	Leisha's Song	Fire and Ice/Melange Books	Finalist	
2021	Nancy Springer	Enola Holmes and the Black Barouche	Wednesday Books	Finalist	
2022	Nancy Springer	Enola Holmes and the Elegant Escapade	Wednesday Books	Winner	
2022	Fleur Bradley	Daybreak on Raven Island	Viking Books for Young Readers	Finalist	
2022	Elizabeth C. Bunce	In Myrtle Peril	Algonquin Young Readers	Finalist	
2022	Greg Herren	#shedeservedit	Bold Strokes Books	Finalist	
2022	Frances Schoonmaker	Sid Johnson and the Phantom Slave Stealer	Auctus Publishers	Finalist	
2023	K. B. Jackson	The Sasquatch of Hawthorne Elementary	Reycraft Books	Winner	
2023	Elizabeth C. Bunce	Myrtle, Means, and Opportunity	Little, Brown Books for Young Readers	Finalist	
2023	Alex Segura	Araña and Spiderman	Random House/ Marvel	Finalist	
2023	Taryn Souders	The Mystery of the Radcliffe Riddle	Sourcebooks Young Readers	Finalist	
2023	Nancy Springer	Enola Holmes and the Mark of the Mongoose	Wednesday Books	Finalist	
2024	K.B. Jackson	The Sasquatch of Harriman Lake	Reycraft Books	Winner	
2024	K.B. Jackson	The Big Grey Man of Ben MacDhui	Reycraft Books	Finalist	
2024	Josh Pachter	First Week Free at the Roomy Toilet	Level Elevate	Finalist	
2024	James Ponti	The Sherlock Society	Aladdin Books	Finalist	
2024	Frances Schoonmaker	Sid Johnson and the Well-Intended Conspiracy	Auctus Publishers	Finalist	
2025	Mia P. Manansala	Death in the Cards	Delacorte Books for Young Readers	Winner	
2025	James Ponti	Hurricane Heist	Aladdin Books	Finalist	
2025	Lynn Slaughter	Missing Mom	Fire and Ice Young Adult Books	Finalist	
2025	Nancy G. West	Risky Pursuit	Fire and Ice Young Adult Books	Finalist	
2025	Marilyn Levinson	Rufus and the Dark Side of Magic	Level Best Books	Finalist	

=== Special awards ===
==== Malice Domestic Award for Lifetime Achievement ====
Year	Recipient	Ref.
1990	Phyllis A. Whitney	
1994	Mignon G. Eberhart	
1996	Mary Stewart	
1997	Emma Lathen	
1998	Charlotte MacLeod	
1999	Patricia Moyes	
2000	Dick Francis	
2001	Mildred Wirt Benson	
2002	Tony Hillerman	
2003	Barbara Mertz (also known as Elizabeth Peters and Barbara Michaels)	
2004	Marian Babson	
2005	H.R.F. Keating	
2006	Robert Barnard	
2007	Carolyn Hart	
2008	Peter Lovesey	
2009	Anne Perry	
2010	Mary Higgins Clark	
2011	Sue Grafton	
2012	Simon Brett	
2013	Aaron Elkins	
2014	Dorothy Cannell, Joan Hess, and Margaret Maron	
2015	Sara Paretsky	
2016	Katherine Hall Page	
2017	Charlaine Harris	
2018	Nancy Pickard	

==== Malice Domestic Poirot Award ====
Year	Recipient	Description
2003	David Suchet	Actor
2004	Ruth Cavin	Thomas Dunne Books editor
2005	Angela Lansbury	Actress and singer
2006	Douglas G. Greene	Crippen & Landru Press publisher
2007	None	
2008	Janet Hutchings	Ellery Queen's Mystery Magazine editor
2008	Linda Landrigan	Alfred Hitchcock's Mystery Magazine editor
2009	Kate Stine and Brian Skupin	Mystery Scene publisher
2010	William Link	Screenwriter and producer
2011	Janet Rudolph	
2012	Lee Goldberg	American writer
2013	None	
2014	Tom Schantz	
2015	None	
2016	Barbara Peters	Poisoned Pen Press editor-in-chief
2016	Robert Rosenwald	Poisoned Pen Press president and founder
2017	Martin Edwards	Author
2018	Brenda Blethyn	British actress
2027	Jeffrey Marks	Crippen & Landru Press publisher

== See also ==
- Agatha Christie Award (Japan)
- Agatha-Christie-Krimipreis, a former German literary prize named after Agatha Christie for unpublished crime short stories.
