= Heather Webber =

Heather Webber may refer to:

- Heather Webber (General Hospital), a character on the soap opera General Hospital
- Heather Webber (author), author of romance, mystery and paranormal novels
