= Elizabeth Duncan =

Elizabeth Duncan may refer to:

- Elizabeth Duncan Koontz (1919–1989), née Elizabeth Duncan, African-American educator
- Elizabeth Ann Duncan (1904–1962), American murderer
- Elizabeth Duncan, co-founder of Duncan, Texas
- Elizabeth J. Duncan, Canadian mystery writer
- Liz Duncan, character in The Smart Woman Survival Guide
- Elizabeth Duncan (dancer) (1871–1948), American dancer and dance teacher
