= Mo Moulton =

American author and historian

- Born: 1979 (age 46–47); New York
- Occupations: Historian, professor, author
- Known for: Ireland and the Irish in Interwar England, The Mutual Admiration Society
- Website: momoulton.com//

Mo Moulton (born 1979) is an American author and historian of 20th century Britain and Ireland, interested in gender, sexuality, and colonialism/postcolonialism. He is a professor of modern British and Irish history at the University of Birmingham.

== Education and early life ==
Moulton was born in New York in 1979 and grew up in Massachusetts. He majored in history as an undergraduate at the Massachusetts Institute of Technology, graduating Phi Beta Kappa in 2001. After working for non-profit organisations, he returned to graduate study at Brown University, earning a PhD in 2010.

== Academic career ==
Moulton became a lecturer at Harvard University from 2010 until 2016 before moving to the University of Birmingham as a senior lecturer.

He was elected to the council of the British Association for Irish Studies for the 2021–2023 term.

== Personal life ==
At Birmingham, Moulton is a founder of the College of Arts & Law Trans Support Network.

== Bibliography and book awards ==
- Ireland and the Irish in Interwar England (Cambridge University Press, 2014). Runner-up (proxime accessit) for The Whitfield Prize in 2015
- The Mutual Admiration Society: How Dorothy L. Sayers and Her Oxford Circle Remade the World For Women (Basic Books, 2019) about The Mutual Admiration Society at Somerville College, Oxford. Winner of the 2019 Agatha Award and the 2020 Anthony Award, in their respective non-fiction categories.
