= Barb Goffman =

Author and editor

Barb Goffman is an author of short mystery stories and freelance crime-fiction editor. Her writing has received and been nominated for multiple awards, including winning the Agatha Award and Anthony Award.

Hoffman graduated from law school. She began her career as a newspaper reporter and lawyer. In addition to writing, she is now also an associate editor with Black Cat Weekly.

== Awards ==
Awards for Goffman's writing
Year	Title	Award	Result	Ref.
2005	"Murder at Sleuthfest"	Agatha Award for Best Short Story	Finalist	
2009	"The Worst Noel"	Agatha Award for Best Short Story	Finalist	
2010	"Volunteer of the Year"	Agatha Award for Best Short Story	Finalist	
2011	"Truth and Consequences"	Agatha Award for Best Short Story	Finalist	
2012	"The Lord is My Shamus"	Agatha Award for Best Short Story	Finalist	
2012	"Truth and Consequences"	Anthony Award for Best Short Story	Finalist	
2012	"Truth and Consequences"	Macavity Award for Best Short Story	Finalist	
2013	"Evil Little Girl"	Agatha Award for Best Short Story	Finalist	
2013	"The Lord is My Shamus"	Anthony Award for Best Short Story	Finalist	
2013	"The Lord is My Shamus"	Macavity Award for Best Short Story	Won	
2013	"Nightmare"	Agatha Award for Best Short Story	Finalist	
2014	"The Shadow Knows"	Agatha Award for Best Short Story	Finalist	
2015	"The Shadow Knows"	Anthony Award for Best Short Story	Finalist	
2015	"The Shadow Knows"	Macavity Award for Best Short Story	Finalist	
2015	"A Year Without Santa Claus?"	Agatha Award for Best Short Story	Won	
2016	"The Best-Laid Plans"	Agatha Award for Best Short Story	Finalist	
2016	"A Year Without Santa Claus?"	Macavity Award for Best Short Story	Finalist	
2017	"Whose Wine Is It Anyway?"	Agatha Award for Best Short Story	Finalist	
2018	"Bug Appétit"	Agatha Award for Best Short Story	Finalist	
2018	"Whose Wine Is It Anyway"	Anthony Award for Best Short Story	Finalist	
2018	"Whose Wine Is It Anyway"	Macavity Award for Best Short Story	Finalist	
2019	"Alex’s Choice"	Agatha Award for Best Short Story	Finalist	
2019	"Bug Appétit"	Anthony Award for Best Short Story	Finalist	
2019	"Bug Appétit"	Macavity Award for Best Short Story	Finalist	
2020	"Alex’s Choice"	Macavity Award for Best Short Story	Finalist	
2020	Crime Travel	Anthony Award for Best Anthology	Finalist	
2020	"Dear Emily Etiquette"	Agatha Award for Best Short Story	Won	
2021	"Dear Emily Etiquette"	Anthony Award for Best Short Story	Finalist	
2021	"Dear Emily Etiquette"	Macavity Award for Best Short Story	Finalist	
2021	"A Family Matter"	Agatha Award for Best Short Story	Finalist	
2021	"A Tale of Two Sisters"	Agatha Award for Best Short Story	Finalist	
2022	"Beauty and the Beyotch"	Agatha Award for Best Short Story	Won	
2023	"Beauty and the Beyotch"	Anthony Award for Best Short Story	Won	
2023	"Beauty and the Beyotch"	Macavity Award for Best Short Story	Won	
2023	"The Gift"	International Thriller Writers Award for Best Short Story	Finalist	
2023	"Real Courage"	Agatha Award for Best Short Story	Finalist	
2023	"Real Courage"	Anthony Award for Best Short Story	Finalist	

== Publications ==
=== Anthologies edited ===
- Crime Travel, 2020

=== Short stories ===
- "Real Courage," Black Cat Mystery Magazine issue 14
- "The Joys of Owning a Dog," Black Cat Mystery Magazine issue 13
- "The Gift," Land of 10,000 Thrills: Bouchercon Anthology 2022
- "For Bailey," Low Down Dirty Vote Volume 3: The Color of My Vote
- "Go Big or Go Home," Malice Domestic 16: Mystery Most Diabolical
- "Beauty and the Beyotch," Sherlock Holmes Mystery Magazine issue 29
- "Five Days to Fitness," Murder in the Mountains
- "Out of a Fog," Black Cat Mystery Magazine issue 10
- "Wishful Thinking," Black Cat Weekly issue 6; also published as a stand-alone story
- "Humor Risk," Monkey Business: Crime Fiction Inspired by the Films of the Marx Brothers
- "Ice Ice Baby," Alfred Hitchcock's Mystery Magazine September/October 2021 issue
- "A Tale of Two Sisters," Murder on the Beach
- "James," Only the Good Die Young: Crime Fiction Inspired by the Songs of Billy Joel
- "An Inconvenient Sleuth," Black Cat Mystery Magazine issue 8
- "That Poor Woman," Ellery Queen's Mystery Magazine January/February 2021 issue
- "A Family Matter," Alfred Hitchcock's Mystery Magazine January/February 2021 issue
- "Second Chance," Mickey Finn: 21st Century Noir volume 1
- "Eat, Drink, and Be Murdered," Alfred Hitchcock's Mystery Magazine November/December 2020 issue
- "Dear Emily Etiquette," Ellery Queen's Mystery Magazine, September/October 2020 issue
- "Man to Man," The Beat of Black Wings: Crime Fiction Inspired by the Songs of Joni Mitchell
- "Alex's Choice," Crime Travel: Tales of Mystery and Time Travel
- "The Power Behind the Throne," Deadly Southern Charm: A Lethal Ladies Mystery Anthology
- "Punching Bag," Flash Bang Mysteries Winter 2019 issue
- "Bug Appétit," Ellery Queen's Mystery Magazine November/December 2018 issue
- "The Case of the Missing Pot Roast," Florida Happens: Tales of Mystery, Mayhem, and Suspense from the Sunshine State
- "Till Murder Do Us Part," Chesapeake Crimes: Fur, Feathers, and Felonies
- "Crazy Cat Lady," Black Cat Mystery Magazine issue 1
- "Whose Wine Is It Anyway?" 50 Shades of Cabernet; also published as a stand-alone story
- "The Best-Laid Plans," Malice Domestic 11: Murder Most Conventional
- "Stepmonster," Chesapeake Crimes: Storm Warning
- "The Wrong Girl," Flash and Bang: A Short Mystery Fiction Society Anthology
- "A Year Without Santa Claus?" Alfred Hitchcock's Mystery Magazine, January/February 2015 issue
- "It's A Trap!" The Killer Wore Cranberry: A Fourth Meal of Mayhem
- "The Shadow Knows," Chesapeake Crimes: Homicidal Holidays
- "Dead and Buried Treasure," All Hallows' Evil
- "Operation Knock Her Down a Peg," The Killer Wore Cranberry: Room For Thirds
- "Nightmare," Don’t Get Mad, Get Even
- "Have Gun - Won't Travel," Don’t Get Mad, Get Even
- "Evil Little Girl," Don’t Get Mad, Get Even
- "Christmas Surprise," Don’t Get Mad, Get Even
- "Suffer the Little Children," Don’t Get Mad, Get Even
- "Ulterior Motives," Ride 2
- "Bon Appetit," Nightfalls: Notes from the End of the World
- "Murder a la Mode," The Killer Wore Cranberry: A Second Helping
- "The Lord Is My Shamus," Chesapeake Crimes: This Job is Murder
- "Truth and Consequences," Mystery Times Ten
- "Biscuits, Carats, and Gravy," The Killer Wore Cranberry; also published as a stand-alone story
- "An Officer and a Gentleman's Agreement," Murder to Mil-Spec
- "The Contest," 2010 Deadly Ink Short Story Collection
- "Volunteer of the Year," Chesapeake Crimes: They Had It Comin'
- "The Worst Noel," The Gift of Murder
- "Compulsive Bubba," Chesapeake Crimes 3
- "Murder at Sleuthfest," Chesapeake Crimes II
