= Susan M. Boyer =

American author

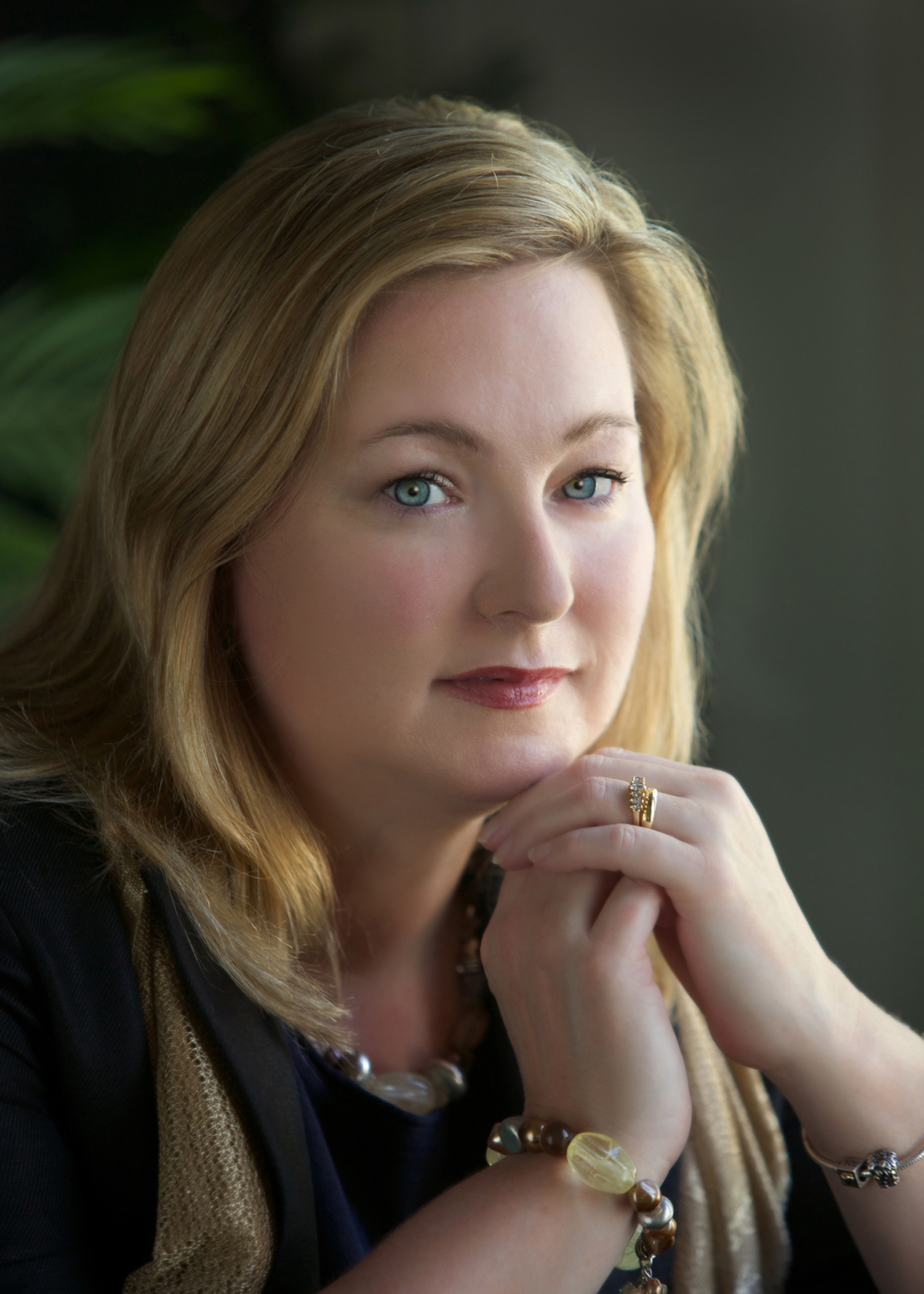
- Occupation: Author
- Writing career
- Genre: Mystery
- Notable awards: Daphne du Maurier Award; 2012; Agatha Award; 2013
- Website: susanmboyer.com

Susan M. Boyer is a USA Today bestselling author of mystery novels set in the American South.

== Honors and awards ==
Boyer won a Romance Writers of America Daphne du Maurier award in 2012 and an Agatha Award for Best First Novel in 2013 for her debut novel, Lowcountry Boil. That title was also nominated for a Macavity Award in 2013.

Boyer's third novel, Lowcountry Boneyard, was a Spring 2015 Southern Independent Booksellers Alliance Okra Pick.

The first novel in Boyer's Carolina Tales Series, Big Trouble on Sullivan's Island, won the 2024 Independent Publisher Book Awards silver medal for Southeast Regional Fiction and was a 2024 finalist for the National Indie Excellence Award in the category of Regional Fiction: Southeast.

The Sullivan's Island Supper Club, the second volume of the Carolina Tales Series, won the 2025 Independent Publisher Book Awards bronze medal for Southeast Regional Fiction.

Her work has also been nominated for the Pat Conroy Beach Music Mystery Prize, and the Southern Book Prize in Mystery & Detective Fiction.

== Bibliography ==
=== The Liz Talbot Mystery Series ===
Lowcountry Boil (2012)

Lowcountry Bombshell (2013)

Lowcountry Boneyard (2015)

Lowcountry Bordello (2015)

Lowcountry Book Club (2016)

Lowcountry Bonfire (2017)

Lowcountry Bookshop (2018)

Lowcountry Boomerang (2019)

Lowcountry Boondoggle (2020)

Lowcountry Boughs of Holly (2020)

Postcards from Stella Maris (2022)

Lowcountry Getaway (2022)

=== The Carolina Tales Series ===
Big Trouble on Sullivan's Island (2023)

Beginnings - The Sullivan's Island Supper Club (2024)

The Sullivan's Island Supper Club (2024)

Trouble's Turn to Lose (2026)

=== Talbot & Andrews Investigations Series ===
Hard Candy Christmas (2026)

Here You Come Again (forthcoming)

== Personal life ==
Boyer enjoys beaches, Southern food, and small Southern towns. She currently lives in Greenville, in South Carolina with her husband.
