= L. A. Chandlar =

American author (b. 1971)

Laurie Chandlar (born 1971) is an American author of historical mystery novels. She is best known for her Art Deco Mystery series.

== Biography ==
Chandlar was born in 1971, and grew up in Metro Detroit. She received a bachelor's degree from the University of Michigan, where she double-majored in English and public relations. While at the University of Michigan, she met her husband.

Following graduation, Chandlar worked for General Motors. In 2001, she and her husband moved to New York City, where she continues to live.

== Awards ==
Awards for Chandlar's writing
Year	Title	Award	Result	Ref.
2018	The Gold Pawn	Agatha Award for Best Historical Novel	Finalist	
2019	The Pearl Dagger	Agatha Award for Best Historical Novel	Finalist	
2020	The Pearl Dagger	Anthony Award for Best Paperback Original	Finalist	
2020	The Pearl Dagger	Lefty Award for Best Historical Mystery	Finalist	
2020	The Pearl Dagger	Macavity Award for Best Historical Mystery	Finalist	

== Publications ==
- The Silver Gun. Kensington Books. 2017. ISBN 978-1-4967-1341-4.
- The Gold Pawn. Kensington Books. 2018. ISBN 978-1-4967-1343-8.
- The Pearl Dagger. Kensington Books. 2019. ISBN 978-1-4967-1345-2.
