= Annette Dashofy =

American author

Annette Dashofy is an American author of mystery, suspense, and thriller novels.

== Biography ==
Dashofy was born and raised in rural Pennsylvania, where she still lives with her husband.

After graduating from high school, Dashofy worked as an emergency medical technician for five years. She self-published her first novel, Circle of Influence, in 2014. At present, she serves at the vice president of Sisters in Crime's Pittsburgh Chapter, as well as a board member for Pennwriters.

Annette is the current vice president of the Pittsburgh Chapter of Sisters in Crime and was their Saturday keynote speaker at the 2017 Pennwriters Conference.

== Awards and honors ==
In 2013, Dashofy received Pennwriters' Meritorious Service Award and served as the organizations' keynote speaker for their 2017 Pennwriters Conference.

Lost Legacy was a USA Today bestselling novel. In March 2017, Dasofy's debut novel, Circle of Influence, was the fifth-best selling self-published novel.

In 2021, Dashofy was the keynote speaker at Festival of Books in the Alleghenies.

Awards for Dashofy's writing
Year	Author	Title	Result	Ref.
2014	Circle of Influence	Agatha Award for Best First Novel	Finalist	
2015	Bridges Burned	Agatha Award for Best Contemporary Novel	Finalist	
2017	No Way Home	Agatha Award for Best Contemporary Novel	Finalist	
2018	Cry Wolf	Agatha Award for Best Contemporary Novel	Finalist	
2019	Fair Game	Agatha Award for Best Contemporary Novel	Finalist	
2022	Death by Equine	Dr. Tony Ryan Book Award	Winner	

== Publications ==
=== Standalone novels ===
- Death by Equine (2022)
- Where the Guilty Hide (2023)

=== Zoe Chambers Mysteries series ===
1. Circle of Influence (2014)
2. Lost Legacy (2014)
3. Bridges Burned (2015)
4. With a Vengeance (2016)
5. No Way Home (2017)
6. Uneasy Prey (2018)
7. Cry Wolf (2018)
8. Fair Game (2019)
9. Under the Radar (2020)
10. Til Death (2020)
11. Fatal Reunion (2022)
