= Deborah Adams =

American writer

- Occupation: Author

Deborah Adams, also known as Deborah-Zenha Adams, is an American author.

== Biography ==
A seventh-generation Tennessean, Adams was born and raised primarily in Tennessee, although she lived for several years during childhood in Western Kentucky.

Her first book, All The Great Pretenders, was nominated for the Agatha Award for Best First Mystery. This was followed by six more books in the Jesus Creek series. In 1995, she won the Macavity Award for her short story "Cast Your Fate to the Wind". She was also nominated for an Agatha Award for this story. In 2018, her comedic magical-realism novel, {This Tale Is True}, was published.

She is a charter member of the Southern Literary Coalition and is the founder of the Femmes Fatales, a group of cozy mystery writers that began collaborating on a newsletter (later a blog) in the mid-1990s, and continues until the present. Adams was a co-founder of Oconee Spirit Press, which published a number of popular authors during its ten-year run.

For many years, Adams worked as an advocate for victims of domestic violence (the topic of her fourth mystery, All The Hungry Mothers), and continues to advocate for victims of violence.

She is a certified naturalist and an avid proponent of environmental sustainability.

Adams studied yoga under the direction of Yogi Shubha Darshan Muni. At his urging, she began teaching yoga at different locations in her area. She later combined her yoga and writing experience and partnered with yoga studios throughout the southern United States to create her signature workshop, Write Your Yoga Story (even if you aren't a writer).

== Bibliography ==
=== Novels ===
==== Jesus Creek novels ====
- All The Great Pretenders (1992)
- All The Crazy Winters (1992)
- All The Dark Disguises (1993)
- All The Hungry Mothers (1994)
- All The Deadly Beloved (1995)
- All The Blood Relations (1996)
- All The Dirty Cowards (2000)

==== Stand-alone novels ====
- {This Tale Is True} (2018)
