= Maine Writers & Publishers Alliance =

Membership organisation based in Maine

The Maine Writers & Publishers Alliance (MWPA) – EIN 010375832 – is a membership organisation established in Maine in 1975. It sponsors awards such as the Maine Literary Award, and events such as the Celebration of Write ME: An Epistolary Poetry Project. It also campaigns on literature-related issues including undermining school library book bans, (Note: When Gender Queer: A Memoir was banned from school libraries, MWPA distributed free copies.) and promotes competitions including the CrimeFlash Fiction contest. In 2024 it had $566k revenue and assets of $161,273.

Its award winners include Katherine Hall Page (CrimeMaster, 2022),, Lily King (Maine Fiction Award, 2011), and Paul Doiron (Maine Literary Award for Crime Fiction, 2012). 2021 winners included Carolyn Chute and Anica Mrose Rissi.

The Alliance's early papers are deposited in the Bowdoin College archives.
