= Edith Skom =

American novelist

Edith Mary Skom (née Rosen; August 8, 1929 – February 3, 2016) was the author of three detective novels with a nineteenth-century literature theme, published between 1989 and 1998. The books feature amateur sleuth Professor Beth Austen, and take place at the fictional "Midwestern University."

Edith Skom was a Distinguished Senior Lecturer Emeritus in The Writing Program at Northwestern University where she taught for three decades. Her courses ranged from a freshman seminar to advanced writing courses. Skom's 1989 novel was "nominated for an Agatha Award, a MacCavity Award and an Anthony Award."

== Books ==
- The Mark Twain Murders, 1989 (nominated for an Agatha, an Anthony and a Macavity Award)
- The George Eliot Murders, 1995
- The Charles Dickens Murders, 1998
