= Amanda Flower =

American writer

- Born: January 23, 1980 (age 46); Akron, Ohio, U.S.
- Occupation: Writer
- Writing career
- Pen name: Isabella Alan
- Genre: Mystery fiction
- Notable awards: Agatha Award (2015, 2022, 2024)
- Website: amandaflower.com

Amanda Flower (born January 23, 1980, in Akron, Ohio) is an American writer of mystery novels, both under her real name and the pen name Isabella Alan. She writes for adults and children. She won the Agatha Award for Best Children's/Young Adult Fiction in 2015 for Andi Unstoppable, won the Agatha Award for Best Historical Novel in 2022 (Because I Could Not Stop for Death) and 2024 (To Slip the Bonds of Earth), and was nominated for Agatha Awards in 2010 (Maid of Murder), 2013 (Andi Unexpected), 2014 (Andi Under Pressure), and 2023 (I Heard a Fly Buzz When I Died). Flower formerly also worked as a librarian.

== Publications ==
=== As Amanda Flower ===
==== India Hayes series ====
1. Maid of Murder, Five Star Publishing, 2010
2. Murder in a Basket, Five Star Publishing, 2012

==== Amish Candy Shop series ====
1. Assaulted Caramel, Kensington Publishing, 2017
2. Lethal Licorice, Kensington Publishing, 2018
3. Premeditated Peppermint, Kensington Publishing, 2018
4. Criminally Cocoa, Kensington Publishing, 2019
5. Toxic Toffee, Kensington Publishing, 2019
6. Marshmallow Malice, Kensington Publishing, 2020
7. Lemon Drop Dead, Kensington Publishing 2021
8. Peanut Butter Panic, Kensington Publishing, 2022
9. Blueberry Blunder, Kensington Publishing, 2023

==== Amish Matchmaker series ====
1. Matchmaking Can Be Murder, Kensington Publishing, 2019
2. Courting Can Be Killer, Kensington Publishing, 2020
3. Marriage Can Be Mischief, Kensington Publishing, 2021
4. Honeymoons Can Be Hazardous, Kensington Publishing, 2022
5. Dating Can Be Deadly, Kensington Publishing, 2023

==== Appleseed Creek series ====
1. A Plain Death, B&H Publishing, 2012
2. A Plain Scandal, B&H Publishing, 2013
3. A Plain Disappearance, B&H Publishing, 2013
4. A Plain Malice, CreateSpace Independent Publishing Platform, 2014

==== Andi Boggs series ====
1. Andi Unexpected, Zonderkidz, 2013
2. Andi Under Pressure, Zonderkidz, 2014
3. Andi Unstoppable, Zonderkidz, 2015

==== Living History Museum series ====
1. The Final Reveille, Midnight Ink, 2015
2. The Final Tap, Midnight Ink, 2016
3. The Final Vow, Midnight Ink, 2017

==== Magical Bookshop series ====
1. Crime and Poetry, Penguin Random House, 2016
2. Prose and Cons, Penguin Random House, 2016
3. Murders and Metaphors, Crooked Lane Books, 2019
4. Verse and Vengeance, Crooked Lane Books, 2019
5. Crimes and Covers, Crooked Lane Books, 2022

==== Magic Garden series ====
1. Flowers and Foul Play, Crooked Lane Books, 2018
2. Death and Daisies, Crooked Lane Books, 2019
3. Mums and Mayhem, Crooked Lane Books, 2020

==== Piper & Porter series ====
1. Dead-End Detective, Hallmark Publishing, 2020
2. Frozen Detective, Hallmark Publishing, 2022

==== Farm to Table series ====
1. Farm to Trouble, Poisoned Pen Press, 2021
2. Put Out to Pasture, Poisoned Pen Press, 2022
3. In Farm's Way, Poisoned Pen Press, 2023

==== Emily Dickinson series ====
1. Because I Could Not Stop for Death, Berkley Books, 2022
2. I Heard a Fly Buzz When I Died, Berkley Books, 2023
3. I Died for Beauty, Berkley Books, 2025

==== Katharine Wright series ====
1. To Slip the Bonds of Earth, Kensington Publishing, 2024
2. Not They Who Soar, Kensington Publishing, 2025

=== As Isabella Alan ===
==== Amish Quilt Shop series ====
Plainly Murder, New American Library, 2013, prequel novella

1. Murder, Plain and Simple, New American Library, 2013
2. Murder, Simply Stitched, New American Library, 2014
3. Murder, Served Simply, New American Library, 2014
4. Murder, Plainly Read, New American Library, 2015
5. Murder, Handcrafted, New American Library, 2016
