= Penny Warner =

American mystery writer

Penny Warner is an American mystery writer who has won multiple Agatha Awards. She has also written more than 50 books on subjects ranging from cooking to parenting guides to party and activity books.

== Life ==
Warner earned a master's degree in special education and has taught child development at Diablo Valley College in San Ramon, California and at Chabot College for 20 years. She has also taught sign language, special education, infant development, and preschool for deaf children.

Warner has written more than 50 nonfiction books aimed at parents and children on topics ranging from child development to party planning to games and activities. Her nonfiction has been published by Simon & Schuster, Penguin, Meadowbrook Press, and other publishers.

She currently lives in the East Bay region of California.

== Mystery writing ==
Warner is the author of the Connor Westphal mystery series, about a deaf reporter in the California Gold Country. The first book in the series, Dead Body Language, won the Macavity Award for Best First Novel in 1998. Her children's mystery, Mystery Of The Haunted Caves: A Troop 13 Mystery, won the Agatha Award for Best Children/Young Adult Fiction in 2001, along with an Anthony Award for Best Juvenile Mystery.

=== The Code Busters Club series ===
In 2011, Warner published the first book in a new children's series called The Code Busters Club. The series includes codes in the story for readers to solve. So far four novels in the series have been released. Two of the novels have won the Agatha Award Nominee for Best Children's/Young Adult Mystery while the other two have been finalists for the award.

Books in the series include:

- The Secret of the Skeleton Key (2011 nominee for the Agatha Award for Best Children's/Young Adult Mystery)
- The Haunted Lighthouse (2012 winner of the Agatha Award for Best Children's/Young Adult Mystery)
- The Mystery of the Pirate’s Treasure (2013 nominee for the Agatha Award for Best Children's/Young Adult Mystery)
- The Mummy’s Curse (2014 winner of the Agatha Award for Best Children's/Young Adult Mystery
- The Hunt for the Missing Spy
- The Secret of the Puzzle Box

== Awards ==
- Dead Body Language won the Macavity Award for Best First Novel, 1998.
- Mystery Of The Haunted Caves: A Troop 13 Mystery won the Agatha Award for Best Children/Young Adult Fiction, 2001.
- The Haunted Lighthouse: The Code Busters Club won the Agatha Award for Best Children/Young Adult Fiction, 2013.
- The Secret of the Puzzle Box: The Code Busters Club won the Agatha Award for Best Children/Young Adult Fiction, 2017.
