= Katherine Hall Page =

American author since 1990 (born 1947)

Katherine Hall Page (born July 7, 1947) is an American writer of cozy mysteries. Page has written twenty-five books in her Faith Fairchild series and four Christie and Company juvenile mysteries. Between 1990 and 2005, Page won three Agatha Awards. She was nominated for two Edgar Awards and a Macavity Award during this time period. In 2024, Hall became a Grand Master at the Edgar Awards. Outside of writing, Page worked in special education between the 1960s to 1980s.

== Early life and education ==
Page was born on July 7, 1947, in New Jersey. For her post-secondary education, Page started with a Bachelor of Arts from Wellesley College in 1969 and a Master of Education from Tufts University in 1974. She later received a Doctor of Education from Harvard University in 1985.

== Career ==
From the 1960s to 1980s, Page worked with teenagers in special education while teaching history and art. She continued her educational career as a consultant in 1985. In 1990, Page wrote The Body in the Belfry as a stand-alone book. After her editor asked when the next story in the series would be written, Page created the Faith Fairchild books with the publication of The Body in the Kelp.

While writing The Body in the Fjord, Page expanded her writing to juvenile mysteries in the late 1990s. After publishing Christie and Company in 1996, Page added three more books to the Christie and Company series throughout the remainder of the 1990s. In 2019, her Faith Fairchild series grew to twenty five books after the release of The Body in the Wake. Apart from her series, Page released Club Meds in 2006.

== Writing style and themes ==
Page bases the Faith Fairchild series around the criminal and methodology of the crime while planning out her characters, dialogue and timeline of events. For her locations, Page merged neighboring towns of Boston, Massachusetts, to create her fictional town of Aleford. Her other fictional location, Sanpere Island, is based on Deer Isle, Maine. From her third Faith Fairchild book onwards, Page used her made-up town of Aleford in every other book while incorporating other American and European locations.

With her fourth book, Page started to include accompanying recipes that were part of her stories. She also created a compilation of the recipes from her series with the 2010 publication titled Have Faith in Your Kitchen. In 1998, Page used a home burglary she experienced as the basis for her book The Body in the Bookcase.

== Awards and honors ==
As part of her six Agatha Awards nominations, Page won the Best First Novel category in 1990 with The Body in the Belfry. “The Would-Be Widower" received the 2001 Best Short Story award while The Body in the Snowdrift won the Best Novel category in 2005. At the Edgar Awards, Page was nominated for the 1998 Best Juvenile award with Christie & Company Down East and the 2004 Mary Higgins Clark Award with The Body in the Lighthouse. In 2016, Page was selected to receive a lifetime achievement award at the Malice Domestic convention. Hall became a Grand Master during the Edgar Awards held in 2024.

During the Maine Literary Aeards, The Body in the Wake was nominated for the Book Award for Crime Fiction in 2020. The Body in the Web was nominated for this award in 2024. Page was chosen as a CrimeMaster by The Maine Writers & Publishers Alliance in 2022. During the 2002 Macavity Awards, “The Would-Be Widower" was nominated for the Best Mystery Short Story category.

== Personal life ==
Page is married and has one child.

== Published works ==
=== Faith Fairchild series ===
1. The Body in the Belfry (1990)
2. The Body in the Kelp (1990)
3. The Body in the Bouillon (1991)
4. The Body in the Vestibule (1992)
5. The Body in the Cast (1993)
6. The Body in the Basement (1994)
7. The Body in the Bog (1996)
8. The Body in the Fjord (1997)
9. The Body in the Bookcase (1998)
10. The Body in the Big Apple (1999)
11. The Body in the Moonlight (2000)
12. The Body in the Bonfire (2002)
13. The Body in the Lighthouse (2003)
14. The Body in the Attic (2004)
15. The Body in the Snowdrift (2005)
16. The Body in the Ivy (2007)
17. The Body in the Sleigh (2009)
18. The Body in the Gallery (2011)
19. The Body in the Gazebo (2012)
20. The Body in the Piazza (2013)
21. The Body in the Birches (2014)
22. The Body in the Woods (2017)
23. The Body in the Wake (2019)
24. The Body in the Web (2023)
25. The Body in the Casket (2024)

=== Christie and Company series ===
- Christie & Company (1996)
- Christie & Company Down East (1997)
- Christie & Company in the Year of the Dragon (1997)
- Christie & Company: Bon Voyage (1999)

=== Other books ===
- Club Meds (2006): Standalone YA novel
- Have Faith in Your Kitchen (2010): Cookbook based on the series
- Small Plates (2014): Short story collection
