= Tim Myers (author) =

American author

Tim Myers is an American author who publishes under a number of pen names, including Jessica Beck. As Beck, he is the author of the Donut Shop Mystery, Classic Diner Mystery, Ghost Cat Cozy Mystery, and Cast Iron Cooking Mystery series. The author has been nominated for the Agatha Award and named an Independent Mystery Booksellers Association national bestseller. Beck is most known for the Donut Shop Mystery series, which features main protagonist Suzanne Hart, who runs a Donut Hearts shop in the town of April Springs in North Carolina.

== Bibliography ==
=== Lighthouse Inn Mysteries series ===
1. Innkeeping with Murder, Berkley, June 2001 ISBN 978-0-425-18002-0
2. Reservations for Murder, Berkley, June 2002 ISBN 978-0-425-18525-4
3. Murder Checks Inn, Berkley, December 2002 ISBN 978-0-425-18858-3
4. Room for Murder, Berkley, September 2003 ISBN 978-0-425-19310-5
5. Booked for Murder, Berkley, August 2004 ISBN 978-0-425-19808-7
6. Key to Murder, Self Published, August 2011 ISBN 978-1-4637-8245-0
7. Ring for Murder, Self Published, August 2011 ISBN 978-1-4637-8246-7
8. Honeymoon for Murder, Self Published, May 2017 ISBN 978-1-5450-4868-9

=== Candlemaking Mysteries series ===
1. At Wick's End, Berkley, January 2004 ISBN 978-0-425-19460-7
2. Snuffed Out, Berkley, November 2004 ISBN 978-0-425-19980-0
3. Death Waxed Over, Berkley, October 2005 ISBN 978-0-425-20637-9
4. A Flicker of Doubt, Berkley, January 2006 ISBN 978-0-425-21056-7
5. Waxing Moon: A Short Story, Self Published, March 2011 (e-book)

=== Soapmaking Mysteries series ===
1. Dead Men Don't Lye, Berkley, February 2006 ISBN 978-0-425-20744-4
2. A Pour Way to Dye, Berkley, August 2006 ISBN 978-0-425-21115-1
3. A Mold for Murder, Berkley, April 2007 ISBN 978-0-425-21487-9

=== Gentle Southern Mysteries series ===
1. Coventry, Self Published, August 2011 ISBN 978-1-4637-8509-3
2. A Family of Strangers, Self Published, April 2011 ISBN 978-1-4637-8510-9
3. Volunteer for Murder, Self Published, August 2011 ISBN 978-1-4637-6233-9

=== Paranormal Kids series ===
1. Paranormal Kids, Self Published, April 2011 ISBN 978-1-4637-9200-8
2. Paranormal Camp, Self Published, April 2011 ISBN 978-1-4637-9202-2

=== Wizard's School series ===
1. Year One: The Wizard's Secret, Self Published, August 2011 ISBN 978-1-4637-6221-6
2. Year Two: The Killing Crystal, Self Published, May 2012 ISBN 978-1-4751-9361-9

=== Books of Time series ===
1. The Book of Time and Ben Franklin, Self Published, January 2011 (e-book)
2. The Book of Time and Thomas Edison, Self Published, January 2011 (e-book)
3. The Book of Time and Archimedes, Self Published, January 2011 (e-book)

=== Lost in Art series ===
1. Lost in Monet's Garden, Self Published, January 2011 (e-book)
2. Lost in Picasso's Cubes, Self Published, January 2011 (e-book)

=== Slow Cooker Mysteries series ===
1. Slow Cooked Murder, Self Published, December 2011 ISBN 978-1-4680-9336-0
2. Simmering Death, Self Published, December 2011 ISBN 978-1-4680-9525-8

=== Pizza series ===
1. Rest in Pizza (Pizza Lover's Mystery Book 4) (RestInPizza.de), Published by Join Now, April 2011 ISBN 978-0-7582-7150-1

=== Stand Alone ===
- Crispin Livingston Hughes, Boy Inventor, Self Published, July 2010 (e-book)
- Emma's Emerald Mine, Self Published, July 2010 (e-book)
- The Fairy Godfather: A Modern Romantic Fairy Tale, Self Published, July 2010 ISBN 978-1-4637-5835-6
- Lightning Ridge, Self Published, August 2011 ISBN 978-1-4637-9208-4
- Rebuilding My Life, Self Published, August 2011 ISBN 978-1-4637-9207-7
- Tackling the Truth, Self Published, August 2011 ISBN 978-1-4637-9203-9
- The Amazing Voltini, Self Published, August 2011 ISBN 978-1-4637-9205-3

=== Collections ===
- Long Shots, Self Published, March 2011 (e-book)
- Can You Guess What's Next? Volume One, Self Published, July 2011 (e-book)
- Can You Guess What's Next? Volume Two, Self Published, July 2011 (e-book)
- Did You Solve the Crime? Volume One, Self Published, July 2011 (e-book)
- Did You Solve the Crime? Volume Two, Self Published, July 2011 (e-book)
- Did You Solve the Crime? Volume Three, Self Published, July 2011 (e-book)
- Repeat Performances, Self Published, July 2011 (e-book)
- Beauty Time 3, Self Published, November 2011 (e-book)
- Senior Sleuths, Self Published, November 2011 (e-book)
- Crimes with a Twist, Self Published, July 2014 (e-book)
- Dark Sips of Mystery, Self Published, July 2014 (e-book)
- Hidden Messages, Self Published, July 2014 (e-book)
- Marriage Can Be Murder, Self Published, July 2014 (e-book)
- Money Mysteries, Self Published, July 2014 (e-book)
- Murder is a Special Occasion, Self Published, July 2014 (e-book)
- Murder Nine to Five, Self Published, July 2014 (e-book)
- Pet Mysteries, Self Published, July 2014 (e-book)
- Senior Sleuths Again, Self Published, July 2014 (e-book)
- Turning the Tables, Self Published, July 2014 (e-book)
- Minecraft, RestInPizza Network, September 2016 (full release)

== Pseudonyms ==
- Chris Cavender (Voldechse)
- Jessica Beck
- Elizabeth Bright
- Melissa Glazer
- Casey Mayes
- Ingrid Meier
- D. B. Morgan
- T. S. Punkt (Freezle)
- S. Y. Paulson (undefined)
