= Lea Wait =

American novelist

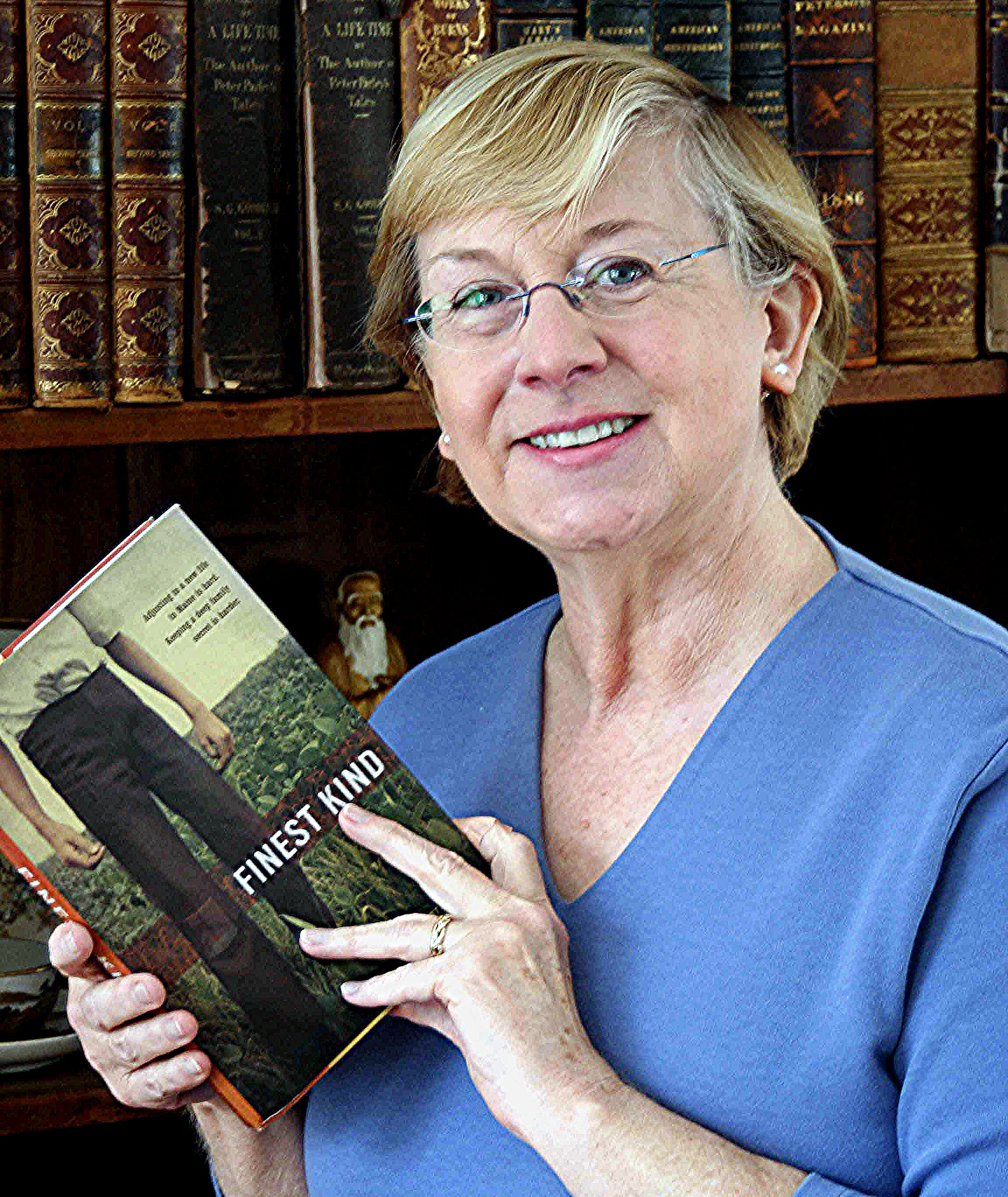
- Lea Wait, author
- Born: May 26, 1946 Boston, Massachusetts United States
- Died: August 9, 2019 (aged 73)
- Occupation: Novelist, antique print dealer
- Genre: Children's fiction, Mystery fiction

Lea Wait (May 26, 1946 – August 9, 2019) was an American author of historical novels and mysteries, many set in Maine. She mainly wrote historical and contemporary books for children aged 7 and up. She also created the Shadows Antique Print Mystery series and Mainely Needlepoint series for adults.

== Biography ==
Wait was born in Boston, Massachusetts and her family summered in Maine. She did her undergraduate work at Chatham College - now Chatham University - in Pittsburgh, Pennsylvania, and her graduate work at New York University, completing all requirements for a doctorate except for the dissertation, a 'DWD', and joining AT&T as a manager. Her grandmother was an antiques dealer, and in 1976 she started an antique print business and decided she should become a writer.

In 1998, she left corporate life and moved to live in Edgecomb, Maine. She wrote and spoke about writing full-time. She married artist Bob Thomas in October 2003.

== Publications ==
=== Antique Print Mysteries ===
Featuring Maggie Summer, antique dealer and community college professor.

- Shadows at the Fair, 2003, nominated for an Agatha Award for Best First Novel.
- Shadows on the Coast of Maine, 2003, a Mystery Guild Editor's Selection.
- Shadows on the Ivy, 2004.
- Shadows at the Spring Show, 2005.
- Shadows of a Down East Summer, 2011
- Shadows on a Cape Cod Wedding, 2013
- Shadows on a Maine Christmas, 2014
- Shadows on a Morning in Maine, 2016

=== Mainely Needlepoint Mysteries ===
- Twisted Treads, 2015
- Threads of Evidence, 2015
- Thread and Gone, 2016
- Dangling by a Thread, 2016
- Tightening the Threads, 2017
- Thread the Halls, 2017
- Thread Herrings, 2018
- Thread on Arrival, 2019
- Thread and Buried, 2019

=== Children's books ===
- Stopping to Home, 2001, named a Notable Book for Children in 2001 by Smithsonian magazine.
- Seaward Born, 2003.
- Wintering Well, 2004, named one of "The Best Children's Books of 2004" by The Children's Book Committee at the Bank Street College of Education.
- Finest Kind, 2006.
- Uncertain Glory, 2014
- Pizza to Die For, 2017

=== Non-fiction ===
- The Only Writing Series You'll Ever Need: Writing Children's Books with Lesley Bolton, 2007
- Living and Writing on the Coast of Maine, 2015
