= The Poisoner's Handbook =

2010 non-fiction book by Deborah Blum

- Author: Deborah Blum
- Cover artist: Marysarah Quinn
- Language: English
- Genre: Science, True crime, history
- Publisher: Penguin Press
- Publication date: 2010
- Publication place: United States
- Media type: Print (Paperback), hardcover
- Pages: 336 pp
- ISBN: 978-1594202438
- OCLC: 2009026461

The Poisoner's Handbook: Murder and the Birth of Forensic Medicine in Jazz Age New York is a New York Times best-selling non-fiction book by Pulitzer Prize-winning science writer Deborah Blum that was released by Penguin Press in 2010.

== Synopsis ==
In 1918, New York City appointed Charles Norris, Bellevue Hospital's chief pathologist, as its first scientifically trained medical examiner. The book, about Norris and Alexander Gettler, the city's first toxicologist, describes the Jazz Age's poisoning cases. Before the two began working in the medical examiner's office, Blum pointed out in her book, poisoners could get away with murder. The book covers the years from 1915 to 1936, which Blum described as a "coming-of-age" for forensic toxicology. "Under (Norris's) direction, the New York City medical examiner's office would become a department that set forensic standards for the rest of the country," Blum wrote.

While a guest on National Public Radio’s "Talk of the Nation/Science Friday" to discuss the book, Blum told host Ira Flatow that she wrote the book because "I've always been interested in poison. I wanted to write about the mystery of how (poisons) kill us.”

== Reception ==
Reader's Digest named The Poisoner's Handbook one of its Top 10 best crime books, saying, "This is science writing at its finest that reads like a mystery novel."

The New York Times placed the book on its Top-rated List on March 5, 2010. In its Sunday book review, the Times said The Poisoner's Handbook was "structured like a collection of linked short stories. Each chapter centers on a mysterious death by poison that Norris and Gettler investigate."

The book was listed as a New York Times bestseller in paperback nonfiction in February 2011. Also, Amazon named The Poisoner's Handbook in its Top 100 Best of 2010.

"Not only is The Poisoner's Handbook as thrilling as any 'CSI' episode," wrote reviewer Art Taylor with The Washington Post, "but it also offers something even better: an education in how forensics really works."

Kirkus Reviews described the book as, "The rollicking story of the creation of modern forensic science by New York researchers during the Prohibition era."

Barnes and Noble's editor's review said this: "The book is an unexpected yet appropriate open-sesame into a world that was planting seeds for the world -- with lethal toxins and cutting-edge tools -- that would later, darkly bloom."

Glen Weldon from NPR Books said: "Rigorously researched and thoroughly engaging, The Poisoner's Handbook is a compelling, comprehensive portrait of the time and place that transformed criminal investigation, and made it much more difficult for that most insidious of murderers to escape the law."

== Documentary ==
PBS optioned The Poisoner's Handbook for TV and produced it as an episode of American Experience. It premiered on January 7, 2014.

== Awards ==
- Finalist for 2010 Agatha Award in Best Non-fiction
- Awarded Best Adult Nonfiction of 2010 by the Society of Midland Authors
