= Sheila Connolly =

American novelist (1950–2020)

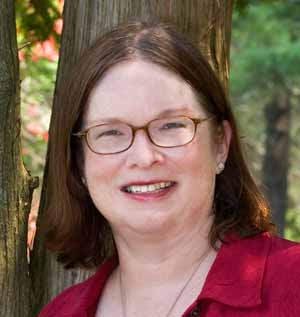
- Born: 1950; Rochester, New York, U.S.
- Died: April 20, 2020 (aged 69–70); Ireland
- Other name: Sarah Atwell (pen name)
- Education: Wellesley College; Harvard University (PhD); University of California, Berkeley (MBA)
- Occupation: mystery writer
- Notable work: Glassblowing Mystery series; Orchard Mystery series; County Cork Mysteries; Museum Mysteries; Victorian Village Mysteries; Relatively Dead series
- Website: www.sheilaconnolly.com

Sheila Connolly (pen name, Sarah Atwell; 1950 – April 20, 2020) was a mystery writer and author of three mystery series published by Berkley Prime Crime.

== Biography ==
Connolly was born in Rochester, New York, and later lived in Delaware, New Jersey, Pennsylvania, North Carolina, California, and Massachusetts. In 1972, she graduated with honors from Wellesley College, then earned a Ph.D. in Fine Arts from Harvard University. When art history jobs proved elusive, she obtained an M.B.A. from the University of California, Berkeley. She worked as an art historian, a municipal financial advisor for U.S. cities and states, a non-profit fundraiser for institutions and two statewide political campaigns, and a professional genealogist. She included elements of all of these in her mysteries.

The Glassblowing Mystery series, written under the pen name Sarah Atwell, debuted in March 2008 with “Through a Glass, Deadly”. In the series, the protagonist, glassblower Em Dowell, manages her own glass shop and studio in Tucson, Arizona, and tries to find time to solve the occasional murder.

“Through a Glass, Deadly” was nominated for a national mystery award, the Agatha Award for Best First Book.

Connolly's Orchard Mystery series opened with “One Bad Apple”, published in August 2008. Meg Corey inherits a drafty colonial house in western Massachusetts without even realizing it comes with an apple orchard. But since she's been downsized out of her banking job in Boston, and the real estate market is so bad that she can't sell the house, she decides to stay on in the small New England town and try to manage the orchard–if she can save it from developers. Her plan is nearly derailed when she finds the body of her ex-boyfriend stuffed in her septic tank.

Connolly's Museum Mysteries began in October 2010 with “Fundraising the Dead”. Nell Pratt, development director for the prestigious Pennsylvania Antiquarian Society, is worried that the institution's reputation will be threatened by the death of one of its key employees–whose body Nell found in the stacks. The police declare the death an accident, but Nell isn't so sure, particularly when she finds information pointing in a different direction. Most recently, the author published Let's Play Dead, set at a children's museum based on the Please Touch Museum in Philadelphia, Pennsylvania. A worker on an exhibit about a local children's author is hurt by electric shock, and then another worker is killed by a shock. Nell was present at the first incident, and she becomes involved in the inquiry into the second man's death. the latest is Fire Engine Dead, about a fire at a warehouse housing the collections of a fire fighting museum.

Connolly was a member of Mystery Writers of America, Romance Writers of America, and Sisters in Crime.

She was living in southeastern Massachusetts shortly before her death. She died April 20, 2020, in Ireland.

== Bibliography ==
=== The Glassblowing Series (Sarah Atwell) ===
- Through A Glass, Deadly (2008)
- Pane of Death (2008)
- Snake in the Glass (2009)

=== The Orchard Series ===
- One Bad Apple (2008)
- Rotten To The Core (2009)
- Red Delicious Death (2010)
- A Killer Crop (2010)
- Bitter Harvest (2011)
- Sour Apples (2012)
- Golden Malicious (2013)
- Picked To Die (Oct. 2014)
- A Gala Event (2015)
- Seeds of Deception (2016)
- A Late Frost (2017)
- Nipped in the Bud (2018)

=== The Museum Series ===
- Fundraising the Dead (2010)
- Let's Play Dead (2011)
- Fire Engine Dead (2012)
- Monument to the Dead (2013)
- Razing the Dead (June 2014)
- Privy to the Dead (2015)
- Dead End Street (2016)

=== The County Cork Mysteries ===
- Buried in a Bog (2013)
- Scandal in Skibbereen (2014)
- An Early Wake (2015)
- A Turn For The Bad (2016)
- Cruel Winter (2017)
- Many a Twist (2018)
- Tied Up With a Bow (novella, 2018)
- The Lost Traveller (2019)
- Fatal Roots (2020)

=== The Victorian Village Mysteries ===
- Murder at the Mansion (2018)
- Killer in the Carriage House (2019)
- The Secret Staircase (2021)

=== The Relatively Dead series ===
- Relatively Dead (2013)
- Seeing the Dead (2014)
- Defending the Dead (2015)
- Watch for the Dead (2015)
- Search for the Dead (2016)
- Revealing the Dead (2018)
