= L. C. Hayden =

American/Mexican mystery novelist (born 1949)

Elsie (L. C.) Hayden
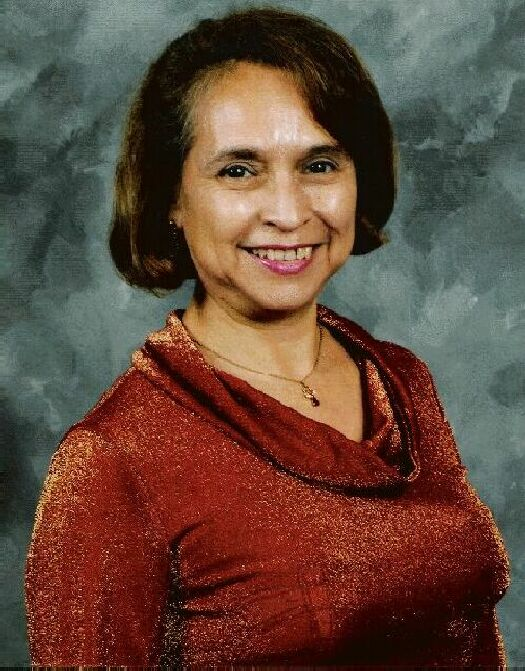
- Born: Elsie Hayden; April 11, 1949; San Luis Potosi, Mexico
- Died: May 28, 2025 (aged 76); El Paso, Texas, United States
- Citizenship: Mexico (birth), United States (naturalized)
- Occupation: Novelist
- Spouse: Richard Hayden
- Children: Donald and Robert Hayden
- Writing career
- Language: English, Spanish
- Genres: Mystery, Inspirational, and Children's
- Notable works: The Harry Bronson Mystery Series, The Aimee Brent Mystery Series, Secrets of the Tunnels
- Website: lchayden.com

L. C. (Elsie) Hayden (April 11, 1949 – May 28, 2025) was an American novelist. She penned three mystery series as well as several stand-alone novels, an inspirational angel series, a YA inspirational novel, and two children's picture books. She wrote "edge of your seat" suspense as well as surprise endings. Hayden was also a high school English teacher for 26 years, having retired in 2001.

== Early life and education ==
L.C. (Elsie) Hayden was born in San Luis Potosi, Mexico, on April 11, 1949. The first three years of her childhood were sickly ones, and monthly shots had to be administered in order to maintain her health. When her health improved, her parents moved to the United States. She became a U.S. citizen when she was in high school and married her high school sweetheart shortly afterwards.

== Career ==
Hayden studied journalism and English at the University of Texas at El Paso and holds a Master's degree in Creative Writing. She teaches writing classes for El Paso Community College and offers several different courses on writing dialogue, editing, and publishing.

From October 2006 to October 2007, Hayden hosted Mystery Writers of America's only live talk show, Murder Must Air.

She posts her adventures and travels on her Facebook page for fans to follow. She and her husband spend part of the year traveling in their motor home in order to do research for their novels, to promote their works, and to give workshops and book signings along the way.

Hayden does extensive research and has dabbled in scuba diving as well as Ride Alongs with police officers in order to make her characters authentic.

Her non-fiction angel/miracle series consists of spiritually uplifting books with true stories that leave the reader wanting more. Her first nonfiction work was released in 2002. When Angels Touch You is the author's true accounts of the miracles in her life.Those encounters led her to write her series based on her own as well as other people's angel and miracle experiences.

The Drums of Gerald Hurd is her only horror novel.

== Personal life ==
Her husband of fifty plus years, R.L. (Richard) Hayden, is also an author of paranormal thrillers. They have two sons, Donald and Robert, and five grandchildren.

Hayden and her husband lived in El Paso, Texas.

She died May 28, 2025 in El Paso.

== Awards ==
Her mystery novels have been finalists for the Agatha Award for Best Novel and the Silver Falchion Award.

== Bibliography ==
=== Harry Bronson Series ===
- When Doubt Creeps In (2021)
- End of the Road (2020) Kindle only
- When Memory Fails (2019) and (2020)
- What Lies Beyond the Fence (2017)
- When Bronson and Darkness Collide (2017), Kindle only
- Wh en the Past Haunts You(2012)
- When Death Intervenes (2010)
- Why Casey Had to Die (2006)
  - Finalist for Agatha Award for Best Novel
- What Others Know (2004)
- Where Secrets Lie (2001)
- When Colette Died (1999)
- Who's Susan? (1997)

=== Aimee Brent Mystery Series ===
- Vengeance in My Heart (2014)
- Ill Conceived (2013)

=== Connie Weaver Mystery (stand-alone) ===
- Secrets of the Tunnels (2015)·

=== Angels and Miracles Series ===
- Brush of an Angel's Wing (2020)
- Angel Trilogy (2017), Kindle only
- Angels and Miracles Abound (2013)
- Angels Around Us (2011)
- When Angels Touch You (2002)

=== Picture books ===
- Puppy Dog and His Bone (2014)
- What Am I? What Am I? (2012)

=== Paranormal mystery ===
- The Drums of Gerald Hurd (2004)

=== YA ===
- Bell Shaped Flowers (2010)

=== Non-fiction ===
- Help! I Want to Write (2012)
