= Marian Babson =

Pseudonym of American mystery writer Ruth Marian Stenstreem

Marian Babson was the pseudonym of American mystery writer Ruth Marian Stenstreem, born in Salem, Massachusetts, in 1929. She died in 2017. She lived most her life in London, England. Babson's books are usually under two hundred pages and often involve cats. Her publisher's tagline for her is "Murder Most British". She was awarded the Crime Writers' Association "Dagger in the Library" award in 1996 for her body of work. She is also an Agatha Award winner.

== Bibliography ==
Perkins and Tate mysteries

- Cover Up Story, 1971
- Murder at the Cat Show, 1972. Also released as Murder on Show.
- Tourists are for Trapping, 1989
- In the Teeth of Adversity, 1990

Trixie Dolan and Evangeline Sinclair mysteries

- Reel Murder, 1986
- Encore Murder, 1989
- Shadows in Their Blood, 1991
- Even Yuppies Die, 1993
- Break a Leg, Darlings, 1995
- Not Quite a Geisha, 2003. Also released as The Cat Who Wasn't A Dog.
- No Cooperation from the Cat, 2012

Brimful Coffers series

- Canapes for the Kitties, 1996
- Retreat from Murder, 2004. Also released as Please Do Feed the Cat.

Others

- Pretty Lady, 1973
- The Stalking Lamb, 1974
- Unfair Exchange, 1974
- Murder Sails at Midnight, 1975
- There Must be Some Mistake, 1975
- Untimely Guest, 1976
- The Lord Mayor of Death, 1977
- Murder, Murder, Little Star, 1977
- Tightrope for Three, 1978
- So Soon Done For, 1979
- The Twelve Deaths of Christmas, 1979
- Dangerous to Know, 1980
- Queue Here for Murder, 1980. Also released as Line Up For Murder.
- Bejewelled Death, 1981
- Death Beside the Seaside, 1982. Also released as Dead Beside the Sea.
- Death Warmed Up, 1982
- A Fool for Murder, 1983
- The Cruise of a Death Time, 1983
- A Trail of Ashes, 1984. Also released as Whiskers and Smoke.
- Death Swap, 1984. Also released as Paws for Alarm.
- Death in Fashion, 1985
- Weekend for Murder, 1985. Also released as Murder on a Mystery Tour.
- Fatal Fortune, 1987
- Guilty Party, 1988
- Past Regret, 1990
- Nine Lives to Murder, 1992
- The Diamond Cat, 1994
- The Company of Cats, 1999. Also released as The Multiple Cat.
- To Catch a Cat, 2000. Also released as A Tealeaf in the Mouse.
- Deadly Deceit, 2001. Also released as The Cat Next Door.
- The Cat Next Door, 2002.
- Only the Cat Knows, 2005
