= Denise Swanson =

American mystery writer

Denise Swanson is an American mystery writer. She is the author of the Scumble River Mysteries series, which is set in a fictional town in Illinois as well as the Devereaux's Dime Store Mysteries series, which is situated in a small fictional town in Missouri. She also went to Loyola University Chicago.

The books in the Scumble River Mysteries series are all in multiple printings and many have featured in Barnes & Noble Mass-Market Mystery, IMBA and BookScan Best-Sellers lists. They have also been BookSense 76 Picks and Top Picks for RT Magazine, as well as nominated for the Agatha Award, the Mary Higgins Clark Award, and the Reviewers Choice Award. Four of her recent books, Murder of the Cat's Meow, Murder of a Wedding Belle, Murder of a Bookstore Babe and Murder of a Creped Suzette, débuted on The New York Times Best-Sellers List.

== Books in order ==
=== Scumble River mysteries ===
01. Murder of a Small-Town Honey
02. Murder of a Sweet Old Lady
03. Murder of a Sleeping Beauty
04. Murder of a Snake in the Grass
05. Murder of a Barbie and Ken
06. Murder of a Pink Elephant
07. Murder of a Smart Cookie
08. Murder of a Real Bad Boy
09. Murder of a Botoxed Blonde
10. Murder of a Chocolate-Covered Cherry
11. Murder of a Royal Pain
12. Murder of a Wedding Belle
13. Murder of a Bookstore Babe
14. Murder of a Creped Suzette
15. Murder of the Cat's Meow
16. Murder of a Stacked Librarian
17. Murder of a Needled Knitter
18. Murder of an Open Book
19. Murder of a Cranky Catnapper
20. Dead in the Water
21. Die Me A River

=== Devereaux's dime-store mysteries ===
01. Little Shop of Homicide
02. Nickeled-and-Dimed to Death
03. Dead Between the Lines
04. Dying for a Cupcake
05. Between a Book and a Hard Place
06. Lions and Tigers and Murder Oh My

07. Fly Me to the Tomb

A Chef-To-Go Mystery

01. Tart of Darkness 02. Leave No Scone Unturned (Release date: March 26, 2019)
