= Mariah Fredericks =

American novelist

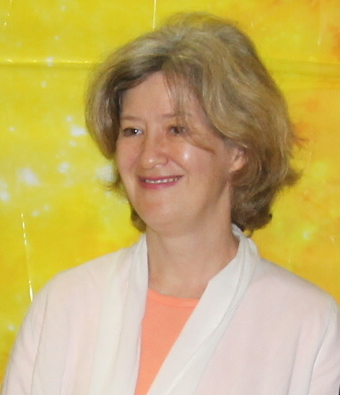
- Fredericks in 2019
- Born: New York City, U.S.
- Education: Vassar College
- Occupation: Author
- Website: www.mariahfredericksbooks.com

Mariah Fredericks is the author of the Jane Prescott mystery series, set in 1910s New York. She was born and raised in New York City. She graduated from Vassar College with a degree in history and was the head copywriter for Book-of-the-Month Club for many years.

== Life and career ==
Many of Fredericks' novels have historical inspiration or are based on true crime cases. Fredericks' 2022 novel The Lindbergh Nanny was a fictionalized account of the Lindbergh kidnapping. She noted that she attempted to represent the story as factually as possible. The inspiration for writing about the Lindbergh case came from the opening sequence of the 1974 Murder on the Orient Express film, which features a nanny character in a kidnapping scene. Her most recent, The Wharton Plot (2024) is a fictional mystery novel inspired by real author Edith Wharton, published to positive review.

== Bibliography ==
=== Novels ===
==== Jane Prescott Mysteries ====
1. A Death of No Importance (2018, ISBN 9781250152978)
2. Death of a New American (2019, ISBN 9781250152992)
3. Death of An American Beauty (2020, ISBN 9781250210883)
4. Death of a Showman (2022, ISBN 9781250830432)

==== In the Cards ====
1. Love (2006, ISBN 9780689876547)
2. Fame (2008, ISBN 9780689876561)
3. Life (2008, ISBN 9780689876585)

==== Standalone Novels ====
- Crunch Time, (2016, ISBN 9780689869389)
- Season of the Witch (2013, ISBN 9780449812778)
- The Girl in the Park (2012, ISBN 9780375868436)
- The True Meaning of Cleavage (2003, ISBN 9780689850929)
- Head Games (2004, ISBN 9780689855320)
- Fatal Distraction (published as Emmi Fredericks; 2004, ISBN 9780312312947)
- The Lindbergh Nanny (2022, ISBN 9781250827401)
- The Wharton Plot (2024, ISBN 9781250827425)

=== Nonfiction ===
- The Smart Girl's Guide to Tarot (published as Emmi Fredericks, 2004, ISBN 9780312323547)
