= Elizabeth J. Duncan =

Canadian writer

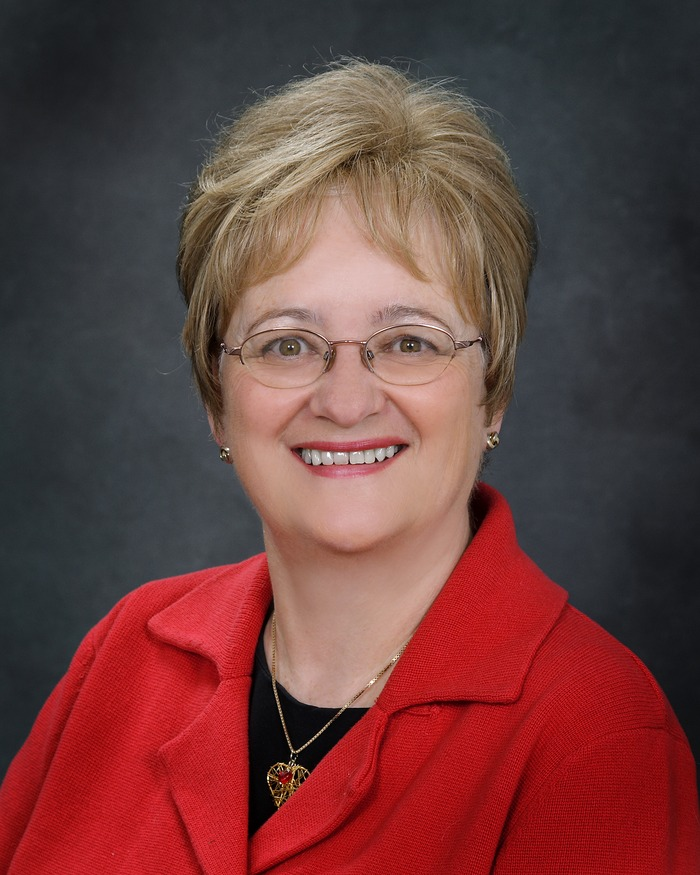
- Education: Carleton University
- Occupation: Writer
- Known for: cozy mysteries

Elizabeth J. Duncan is a Canadian writer of cozy mysteries and the author of the ongoing Penny Brannigan series set in North Wales. The first book in the series, A Cold Light of Mourning, was nominated for the Agatha Award and Arthur Ellis Award in 2009. The fourth novel in the series, A Small Hill to Die On, won the Bony Blithe Award in 2013 and the fifth novel, Never Laugh as A Hearse Goes By, was nominated for the same award in 2014.

== Life and work ==
Duncan graduated from Carleton University, Ottawa, Ontario, Canada, with a BA in English. Prior to becoming a novelist, she worked as a writer and editor for Canadian newspapers, including the Ottawa Citizen and the Hamilton Spectator. She currently teaches in The School for Writers Program at Humber College. She lives in Toronto, Ontario, Canada and spends time abroad each year in North Wales.

== Books ==
- The Cold Light of Mourning (2009, Minotaur Books)
- A Brush with Death (2010, Minotaur Books)
- A Killer's Christmas in Wales (2011, Minotaur Books)
- A Small Hill to Die On (2012, Minotaur Books)
- Never Laugh as a Hearse Goes By (2013, Minotaur Books)
- Slated for Death (2015, Minotaur Books)
- Untimely Death (2015, Crooked Lane Books)
- Murder on the Hour (2016, Minotaur Books)
- Ill Met by Murder (2016, Crooked Lane Books)
- Murder is for Keeps (2017, Minotaur Books)
- Much Ado about Murder (2017, Crooked Lane Books)
- The Marmalade Murders (2018, Minotaur Books)
- Remembering the Dead (2019, Crooked Lane Books)
- On Deadly Tides (2021, Crooked Lane Books)
