= Susan Kandel =

American novelist

Susan Kandel is an American author of a series of mystery books set in Los Angeles featuring sleuth CeCe Caruso, a vintage clothing fashionista and biographer of mystery writers.

Kandel's background is in art history, having been an art critic, university teacher and editor of an art journal.

== Books ==
- I Dreamed I Married Perry Mason
- Not a Girl Detective
- Shamus in the Green Room
- Christietown
- Dial H for Hitchcock

== See also ==
- List of female detective/mystery writers
- List of female detective characters
