= Agatha-Christie-Krimipreis =

German literary prize for unpublished short crime stories

Agatha-Christie-Krimipreis (Agatha Christie Crime Award) was a German literary prize for unpublished crime short stories awarded from 2003 to 2014. Stories with a maximum of ten manuscript pages were requested on a specified topic, changing annually. The 25 best stories were published in an anthology by Fischer Taschenbuchverlag. The awards were presented as part of the annual Krimifestival München (Munich Crime Story Festival), with the three best stories being awarded a non-cash prize. The namesake of the prize was the English crime writer Agatha Christie.

Initially renowned sponsors could be found by the Fischer-Verlag and the annual awards were held in changing, upscale settings. Since 2011, however, the accompanying thriller anthology only appears as an E-book and the value of the prizes for the three winning authors has been steadily declining. The award ceremony was last held in 2014.

== Winners ==
- 2003: Maria Elisabeth Straub for A conta, faz favor!
- 2004: Christoph Spielberg for Happy Birthday
- 2006: Cornelia Schneider for Der Spucker
- 2007: Silke Andrea Schuemmer for Rattenpack
- 2008: Heike Koschyk for Schachmatt
- 2009: Veit Bronnenmeyer for Eigenbemühungen
- 2010: Sabine Trinkaus for Am Tatort
- 2011: Marcus Winter for Einmal ein Held sein
- 2012: Claus Probst für Sieben Leben
- 2013: Marion Schwenninger für Gurkenmord
- 2014: Peter Joerg für Kleinmann befreit sich
