= Susannah Stacey =

Pseudonym used by writers Jill Staynes and Margaret Storey

Susannah Stacey is a pseudonym used by writers Jill Staynes and Margaret Storey. Under this name, the team have produced a series of mystery novel featuring widowed British police Superintendent Bone. They also write a series of mysteries set during the Italian Renaissance under the name of Elizabeth Eyre.

== Titles include ==
- Goodbye Nanny Gray (1987)
- A Knife at the Opera (1988)
- Body of Opinion (1988)
- Grave Responsibility (1990)
- The Late Lady (1992)
- Bone Idle (1993)
- Dead Serious (1995)
- Hunter's Quarry (1998)
