= Heather Webber (author) =

American novelist

Heather Webber is an American author of romance and mystery novels. She also writes paranormal mysteries under the pseudonym Heather Blake.

== Book series ==
Webber's Lucy Valentine series is a paranormal mystery and romance series. Lucy Valentine comes from a family of psychic matchmakers and inherits the family business. She teams up with private investigator Sean Donahue to solve mysteries.

In the Nina Quinn Mystery series, the heroine is a landscape artist and amateur sleuth in Ohio.

Written under the pen name Heather Blake, the Wishcraft Mystery series is made up of paranormal cozy mysteries set in the fictional Enchanted Village of Salem, Massachusetts. Wishcrafters are witches who can grant wishes.

A second paranormal series written under the pen name Heather Blake is the Magic Potion Mysteries, cozy mysteries set in Hitching Post, Alabama. The witches here make potions and hexes.

== Bibliography ==
=== As Heather Webber ===
==== Lucy Valentine Series ====
1. Truly, Madly, St. Martin's Press, 2010
2. Deeply, Desperately, St. Martin's Press, 2010
3. Absolutely, Positively, St. Martin's Press, 2011
4. Definitely, Maybe, St. Martin's Press, 2011 (short story)
5. Perfectly Matched, CreateSpace Independent Publishing Platform, 2012

==== Nina Quinn Mysteries ====
1. A Hoe Lot of Trouble, Avon/HarperCollins, 2004
2. Trouble in Spades, Avon/HarperCollins, 2005
3. Digging Up Trouble, Avon/HarperCollins, 2006
4. Trouble in Bloom, Avon/HarperCollins, 2007
5. Weeding Out Trouble, Avon/HarperCollins, 2008
6. Trouble under the Tree, 2011
7. The Root of All Trouble, 2013

==== Romance Novels ====
- Surrender, My Love, Avalon Books, 2002
- Secrets of the Heart, Avalon Books, 2003
- Hearts Are Wild, Avalon Books, 2004

==== Other Novels ====
- Midnight at the Blackbird Cafe, Forge Books, 2019
- South of the Buttonwood Tree, Forge Books, 2020
- The Lights of Sugarberry Cove, Forge Books, 2021
- In the Middle of Hickory Lane, Forge Books, 2022
- The Forget-Me-Not Library, St. Martin's Press, 2025

=== As Heather Blake ===
==== Wishcraft Mysteries ====
1. It Takes a Witch, NAL/Penguin Group, 2012
2. A Witch Before Dying, NAL/Penguin Group, 2012
3. The Good, the Bad, and the Witchy, NAL/Penguin Group, 2013
4. The Goodbye Witch, NAL/Penguin Group, 2014
5. Some Like it Witchy, NAL/Penguin Group, 2015
6. Gone With the Witch, Penguin Random House, 2016
7. The Witch and the Dead, Berkley, 2016

==== Magic Potion Mysteries ====
1. A Potion to Die For, NAL/Penguin/Obsidian, 2013
2. One Potion in the Grave, NAL/Penguin/Obsidian, 2014
3. Ghost of a Potion, NAL/Penguin Random House, 2015
