= Macavity Awards =

Mystery writer award

The Macavity Awards, established in 1987, are a group of literary awards presented annually to mystery writers. Nominated and voted upon annually by the members of the Mystery Readers International, the award is named for the "mystery cat" of T. S. Eliot's Old Possum's Book of Practical Cats. The award is given in four categories—best novel, best first novel, best nonfiction, and best short story. The Sue Feder Historical Mystery has been given in conjunction with the Macavity Awards.

== Best Mystery Novel ==
The Macavity Award for Best Mystery Novel was first awarded in 1987. To be eligible for the award, the mystery novel must have been published in the previous calendar year.

Best Mystery Novel winners and finalists
Year	Author	Title	Publisher	Result	Ref.
1987	P. D. James	A Taste for Death		Winner	
1987	Lawrence Block	When the Sacred Ginmill Closes		Finalist	
1987	Max Allan Collins	The Million-Dollar Wound		Finalist	
1987	Joe Gores	Come Morning		Finalist	
1987	Stephen Greenleaf	Beyond Blame		Finalist	
1987	Tony Hillerman	Skinwalkers		Finalist	
1987	John le Carré	The Perfect Spy		Finalist	
1987	Bill Pronzini	Deadfall		Finalist	
1987	Masako Togawa	Lady Killer		Finalist	
1987	Collin Wilcox	Night Games		Finalist	
1988	Nancy Pickard	Marriage Is Murder		Winner	
1988	Max Allan Collins	Primary Target		Finalist	
1988	John W. and Joyce H. Corrington	A Project Named Desire		Finalist	
1988	Mickey Friedman	Venetian Mask		Finalist	
1988	Margaret Maron	The Right Jack		Finalist	
1988	Sara Paretsky	Bitter Medicine		Finalist	
1988	Barbara Vine	A Fatal Inversion		Finalist	
1988	John Wainwright	The Tenth Interview		Finalist	
1989	Tony Hillerman	A Thief of Time		Winner	
1989	P. M. Carlson	Murder Unrenovated		Finalist	
1989	Elizabeth George	A Great Deliverance		Finalist	
1989	Sue Grafton	E Is for Evidence		Finalist	
1989	Thomas Harris	The Silence of the Lambs		Finalist	
1989	Sara Paretsky	Blood Shot		Finalist	
1990	Carolyn Hart	A Little Class on Murder		Winner	
1990	James Lee Burke	Black Cherry Blues		Finalist	
1990	George C. Chesbro	Bone		Finalist	
1990	Bartholomew Gill	The Death of a Joyce Scholar		Finalist	
1991	Sharyn McCrumb	If Ever I Return Pretty Peggy-O		Winner	
1991	Elizabeth George	Well-Schooled in Murder		Finalist	
1991	Carolyn G. Hart	Deadly Valentine		Finalist	
1991	Sara Paretsky	Burn Marks		Finalist	
1991	Anne Perry	The Face of a Stranger		Finalist	
1992	Nancy Pickard	I.O.U.		Winner	
1992	Carolyn G. Hart	The Christie Caper		Finalist	
1992	Walter Mosley	A Red Death		Finalist	
1993	Margaret Maron	Bootlegger's Daughter		Winner	
1993	John Dunning	Booked To Die		Finalist	
1993	Sharyn McCrumb	The Hangman’s Beautiful Daughter		Finalist	
1993	Walter Mosley	White Butterfly		Finalist	
1994	Minette Walters	The Sculptress		Winner	
1994	Elizabeth George	Missing Joseph		Finalist	
1994	Carolyn G. Hart	Dead Man’s Island		Finalist	
1994	Janet LaPierre	Old Enemies		Finalist	
1994	Kathy Hogan Trocheck	To Live and Die in Dixie		Finalist	
1995	Sharyn McCrumb	She Walks These Hills		Winner	
1995	Michael Connelly	The Concrete Blonde		Finalist	
1995	Elizabeth George	Playing for the Ashes		Finalist	
1995	Carolyn G. Hart	Scandal in Fair Haven		Finalist	
1995	Mary Willis Walker	The Red Scream		Finalist	
1996	Mary Willis Walker	Under the Beetle's Cellar	Doubleday	Winner	
1996	Barbara D'Amato	Hard Christmas		Finalist	
1996	Michael Connelly	The Last Coyote		Finalist	
1996	John Dunning	Bookman’s Wake		Finalist	
1996	Marcia Muller	A Wild and Lonely Place		Finalist	
1997	Peter Lovesey	Bloodhounds	Mysterious Press	Winner	
1997	Thomas H. Cook	The Chatham School Affair		Finalist	
1997	Janet Evanovich	Two for the Dough		Finalist	
1997	Teri Holbrook	The Grass Widow		Finalist	
1997	Margaret Lawrence	Hearts and Bones		Finalist	
1998	Deborah Crombie	Dreaming of the Bones	Scribner	Winner	
1998	Jan Burke	Hocus	Simon & Schuster	Finalist	
1998	Michael Connelly	Trunk Music	Little Brown & Co.	Finalist	
1998	Arturo Perez-Reverte	The Club Dumas	Harcourt Brace	Finalist	
1998	Donald Westlake	The Ax	Mysterious Press	Finalist	
1999	Michael Connelly	Blood Work	Little Brown & Co.	Winner	
1999	Nevada Barr	Blind Descent	G. P. Putnam's Sons	Finalist	
1999	Laura Lippman	Butchers Hill	Avon	Finalist	
1999	Margaret Maron	Home Fires	Mysterious Press	Finalist	
1999	Abigail Padgett	Blue	Mysterious Press	Finalist	
2000	Sujata Massey	The Flower Master	Knopf	Winner	
2000	Rennie Airth	River of Darkness	Viking Press	Finalist	
2000	Robert Crais	L.A. Requiem	Doubleday	Finalist	
2000	Peter Robinson	In a Dry Season	Avon	Finalist	
2001	Val McDermid	A Place of Execution	Berkley Books	Winner	
2001	Taffy Cannon	Guns and Roses	Perseverance Press/John Daniel & Co.	Finalist	
2001	Joe Lansdale	The Bottoms	Mysterious Press	Finalist	
2001	Anne Perry	Half Moon Street	Ballantine Books	Finalist	
2001	Nancy Pickard	The Whole Truth	Pocket Books	Finalist	
2002	Laurie R. King	Folly	Wiley	Winner	
2002	Harlan Coben	Tell No One	Delacorte Press	Finalist	
2002	Linda Fairstein	The Deadhouse	Scribner	Finalist	
2002	Dennis Lehane	Mystic River	William Morrow & Co.	Finalist	
2002	T. Jefferson Parker	Silent Joe	Hyperion	Finalist	
2003	S.J. Rozan	Winter and Night	Intrigue	Winner	
2003	Mary Kay Andrews	Savannah Blues	HarperCollins	Finalist	
2003	James Lee Burke	Jolie Blon's Bounce	Simon & Schuster	Finalist	
2003	Jan Burke	Nine	Simon & Schuster	Finalist	
2003	Michael Connelly	City of Bones	Little, Brown & Co.	Finalist	
2004	Peter Lovesey	The House Sitter	St. Martin's/Minotaur Books	Winner	
2004	Giles Blunt	The Delicate Storm	G. P. Putnam's Sons	Finalist	
2004	Rhys Bowen	For the Love of Mike	St. Martin's	Finalist	
2004	Ken Bruen	The Guards	St. Martin's/Minotaur Books	Finalist	
2004	David Corbett	Done for a Dime	Ballantine Books	Finalist	
2005	Ken Bruen	The Killing of the Tinkers	Little, Brown & Co.	Winner	
2005	Robin Burcell	Cold Case	Avon	Finalist	
2005	Jeff Lindsay	Darkly Dreaming Dexter	Doubleday	Finalist	
2005	Margaret Maron	High Country Fall	Mysterious Press	Finalist	
2005	T. Jefferson Parker	California Girl	HarperCollins	Finalist	
2005	Peter Robinson	Playing with Fire	William Morrow & Co.	Finalist	
2006	Michael Connelly	The Lincoln Lawyer	Faber & Faber/Farrar, Straus and Giroux	Winner	
2006	Lee Child	One Shot	Delacorte Press	Finalist	
2006	Reed Farrel Coleman	The James Deans	Plume	Finalist	
2006	Tess Gerritsen	Vanish	Ballantine Books	Finalist	
2006	Paul Levine	Solomon vs. Lord	Bantam Books	Finalist	
2006	Peter Robinson	Strange Affair	William Morrow & Co.	Finalist	
2006	Don Winslow	The Power of the Dog	Knopf	Finalist	
2007	Nancy Pickard	The Virgin of Small Plains	Thorndike/ Random House UK	Winner	
2007	Benjamin Black	Christine Falls	Henry Holt/Picador	Finalist	
2007	Jason Goodwin	The Janissary Tree	Farrar, Straus and Giroux	Finalist	
2007	Denise Mina	The Dead Hour	Bantam Books	Finalist	
2007	Peter Robinson	Piece of My Heart	McClelland & Stewart	Finalist	
2007	Julia Spencer-Fleming	All Mortal Flesh	Minotaur Books	Finalist	
2008	Laura Lippman	What the Dead Know	William Morrow & Co.	Winner	
2008	Reed Farrel Coleman	Soul Patch	Midnight Ink	Finalist	
2008	John Connolly	The Unquiet	Ballantine Books	Finalist	
2008	David Corbett	Blood of Paradise	Simon & Schuster	Finalist	
2008	Deborah Crombie	Water Like a Stone	William Morrow & Co.	Finalist	
2009	Deborah Crombie	Where Memories Lie	St. Martin's/Minotaur Books	Winner	
2009	Sean Chercover	Trigger City	Minotaur Books	Finalist	
2009	Declan Hughes	The Dying Breed (UK) / The Price of Blood (US)	John Murray/ William Morrow & Co.	Finalist	
2009	Arnaldur Indridason	The Draining Lake	UK: The Price of Blood	Finalist	
2009	Lisa Lutz	Curse of the Spellmans	Doubleday	Finalist	
2009	Louise Penny	The Cruelest Month	Minotaur Books	Finalist	
2009	Louise Ure	The Fault Tree	HarperCollins	Finalist	
2010	Ken Bruen and Reed Farrel Coleman	Tower	Busted Flush Press	Winner	
2010	Megan Abbott	Bury Me Deep	Simon & Schuster	Finalist	
2010	Deborah Crombie	Necessary as Blood	William Morrow & Co.	Finalist	
2010	Jo Nesbø with Don Bartlett (trans.)	Nemesis	HarperCollins	Finalist	
2010	Louise Penny	The Brutal Telling	Minotaur Books	Finalist	
2010	S.J. Rozan	The Shanghai Moon	Minotaur Books	Finalist	
2011	Louise Penny	Bury Your Dead	Minotaur Books	Winner	
2011	James Lee Burke	The Glass Rainbow	Simon & Schuster	Finalist	
2011	Tana French	Faithful Place	Viking Press	Finalist	
2011	Timothy Hallinan	The Queen of Patpong	HarperCollins/William Morrow & Co.	Finalist	
2011	Deon Meyer	Thirteen Hours	Grove Atlantic	Finalist	
2011	Nancy Pickard	The Scent of Rain and Lightning	Ballantine Books	Finalist	
2012	Sara Gran	Claire DeWitt and the City of the Dead	Houghton Mifflin Harcourt	Winner	
2012	Anne Holt with Marlaine Delargy (trans.)	1222	Scribner	Finalist	
2012	Anthony Horowitz	The House of Silk	Mulholland Books	Finalist	
2012	Michael Koryta	The Ridge	Little, Brown, & Co.	Finalist	
2012	Louise Penny	A Trick of the Light	Minotaur Books	Finalist	
2012	Marcus Sakey	The Two Deaths of Daniel Hayes	Dutton	Finalist	
2012	Duane Swierczynski	Hell & Gone	Mulholland Books	Finalist	
2013	Louise Penny	The Beautiful Mystery	Minotaur	Winner	
2013	Gillian Flynn	Gone Girl	Crown	Finalist	
2013	Peter May	The Black House	Silver Oak	Finalist	
2013	Hank Phillippi Ryan	The Other Woman	Forge Books	Finalist	
2013	B.A. Shapiro	The Art Forger	Algonquin Books	Finalist	
2013	Ariel S. Winter	The Twenty Year Death	Hard Case Crime	Finalist	
2013	Ben H. Winters	The Last Policeman	Quirk Books	Finalist	
2014	William Kent Krueger	Ordinary Grace	Atria Books	Winner	
2014	Thomas H. Cook	Sandrine's Case	Mysterious Press	Finalist	
2014	Mick Herron	Dead Lions	Soho Crime	Finalist	
2014	Alex Marwood	The Wicked Girls	Penguin Books	Finalist	
2014	Louise Penny	How the Light Gets In	Minotaur Books	Finalist	
2014	Ian Rankin	Standing in Another Man's Grave	Reagan Arthur Books	Finalist	
2015	Alex Marwood	The Killer Next Door	Penguin Books	Winner	
2015	Sophie Littlefield	The Missing Place	Gallery	Finalist	
2015	Peter May	The Lewis Man	Quercus	Finalist	
2015	Catriona McPherson	The Day She Died	Midnight Ink	Finalist	
2015	Louise Penny	The Long Way Home	Minotaur Books	Finalist	
2015	Terry Shames	The Last Death of Jack Harbin	Seventh Street Books	Finalist	
2016	Lou Berney	The Long and Faraway Gone	William Morrow & Co.	Winner	
2016	Sharon Bolton	Little Black Lies	Minotaur Books	Finalist	
2016	Tim Hallinan	The Hot Countries	Soho Press	Finalist	
2016	Catriona McPherson	The Child Garden	Midnight Ink	Finalist	
2016	Michael Robotham	Life or Death	Mulholland Books	Finalist	
2016	Don Winslow	The Cartel	Alfred A. Knopf	Finalist	
2017	Louise Penny	A Great Reckoning	Minotaur Books	Winner	
2017	Megan Abbott	You Will Know Me	Little, Brown, & Co.	Finalist	
2017	Matt Coyle	Dark Fissures	Oceanview	Finalist	
2017	Noah Hawley	Before the Fall	UK: Hodder & Stoughton; US: Grand Central Publishing	Finalist	
2017	Mick Herron	Real Tigers	UK: John Murray; US: Soho Press	Finalist	
2017	Laura Lippman	Wilde Lake	William Morrow & Co.	Finalist	
2018	Anthony Horowitz	Magpie Murders	Harper	Winner	
2018	Karen Dionne	The Marsh King's Daughter		Finalist	
2018	Attica Locke	Bluebird, Bluebird	Mulholland Books	Finalist	
2018	Louise Penny	Glass Houses	Minotaur	Finalist	
2018	Thomas Perry	The Old Man	Mysterious Press	Finalist	
2018	Don Winslow	The Force	William Morrow & Co.	Finalist	
2019	Lou Berney	November Road	William Morrow & Co.	Winner	
2019	Alison Gaylin	If I Die Tonight	William Morrow & Co.	Finalist	
2019	Jane Harper	The Lost Man	Flat Iron Books	Finalist	
2019	Jennifer Hillier	Jar of Hearts	Minotaur Books	Finalist	
2019	Naomi Hirahara	Hiroshima Boy	Prospect Park Books	Finalist	
2019	Lisa Unger	Under My Skin	Harlequin – Park Row Books	Finalist	
2020	Adrian McKinty	The Chain	Mulholland Books	Winner	
2020	Steph Cha	Your House Will Pay	Ecco Press	Finalist	
2020	William Kent Krueger	This Tender Land	Atria	Finalist	
2020	Laura Lippman	Lady in the Lake	William Morrow & Co.	Finalist	
2020	Hank Philippi Ryan	The Murder List	Forge Books	Finalist	
2020	James Sallis	Sarah Jane	Soho Crime	Finalist	
2021	S. A. Cosby	Blacktop Wasteland	Flatiron Books	Winner	
2021	Caroline B. Cooney	Before She Was Helen	Ecco Press	Finalist	
2021	Matt Coyle	Blind Vigil	Oceanview Publishing	Finalist	
2021	Louise Penny	All the Devils Are Here	Minotaur Books	Finalist	
2021	Ivy Pochoda	These Women	Poisoned Pen Press	Finalist	
2021	Michael Robotham	When She Was Good	Scribner	Finalist	
2022	S. A. Cosby	Razorblade Tears	Flatiron Books	Winner	
2022	Michael Connelly	The Dark Hours	Little, Brown, & Co.	Finalist	
2022	Val McDermid	1979	Atlantic Monthly	Finalist	
2022	Alan Parks	Bobby March Will Live Forever	World Noir	Finalist	
2022	Chris Whitaker	We Begin at the End	Henry Holt & Co.	Finalist	
2022	Colson Whitehead	Harlem Shuffle	Doubleday	Finalist	
2023	Louise Penny	A World of Curiosities	Minotaur	Winner	
2023	Laurie R. King	Back to the Garden	Bantam	Finalist	
2023	Chris Pavone	Two Nights in Lisbon	MCD	Finalist	
2023	Ian Rankin	A Heart Full of Headstones	Little, Brown	Finalist	
2023	Deanna Raybourn	Killers of a Certain Age	Berkley	Finalist	
2023	Alex Segura	Secret Identity	Flatiron Books	Finalist	
2024	S.A. Cosby	All the Sinners Bleed	Flatiron Books	Winner	
2024	Lou Berney	Dark Ride	Wm. Morrow	Finalist	
2024	Tracy Clark	Hide	Thomas & Mercer	Finalist	
2024	Angie Kim	Happiness Falls	Hogarth	Finalist	
2024	Thomas Perry	Murder Book	Mysterious	Finalist	
2024	Colson Whitehead	Crook Manifesto	Penguin Random House - Doubleday	Finalist	
2025	Duane Swierczynski	California Bear	Mulholland Books	Winner	
2025	John Copenhaver	Hall of Mirrors	Pegasus Crime	Finalist	
2025	James L’Etoile	Served Cold	Level Best	Finalist	
2025	Liz Moore	The God of the Woods	Riverhead Books	Finalist	
2025	Charlotte Vassell	The In Crowd	Doubleday (publisher)	Finalist	
2025	Chris Whitaker	All the Colors of the Dark	Crown Publishing Group	Finalist	

== Best First Mystery (Novel) ==
The Macavity Award for the Best First Mystery Novel was awarded in 1987.

Best First Mystery winners and finalists, 1987-1989
Year	Author	Title	Publisher	Result	Ref.
1987	Faye Kellerman	The Ritual Bath		Winner	
1987	Marilyn Wallace	A Case of Loyalties		Winner	
1987	Too Late To Die	Bill Crider		Finalist	
1987	Floater	Joseph Koenig		Finalist	
1987	Dead Air	Mike Lupica		Finalist	
1987	From a High Place	Edward Mathis		Finalist	
1987	Kiss Me Once	Thomas Maxwell		Finalist	
1988	Robert Crais	The Monkey's Raincoat		Winner	
1988	Michael Allegretto	Death on the Rocks		Finalist	
1988	Carolyn G. Hart	Death on Demand		Finalist	
1988	Jeanne Hart	Fetish		Finalist	
1988	Janet LaPierre	Unquiet Grave		Finalist	
1988	Lia Matera	Where Lawyers Fear To Tread		Finalist	
1988	Matt and Bonnie Taylor	Neon Flamingo		Finalist	
1988	Joseph Telushkin	The Unorthodox Murder of Rabbi Wahl		Finalist	
1988	Scott Turow	Presumed Innocent		Finalist	
1989	Caroline Graham	The Killings at Badger's Drift		Winner	
1989	Mary Lou Bennett	Murder Once Done		Finalist	
1990	Jill Churchill	Grime and Punishment		Winner	
1990	Doug Allyn	The Cheerio Killings		Finalist	
1990	Edith Skom	The Mark Twain Murders		Finalist	
1990	Deborah Valentine	A Collector of Photographs		Finalist	
1990	Susan Wolfe	The Last Billable Hour		Finalist	
1991	Patricia Cornwell	Postmortem		Winner	
1991	Diane Mott Davidson	Catering to Nobody		Finalist	
1991	Janet Dawson	Kindred Crimes		Finalist	
1991	William F. Love	The Chartreuse Clue		Finalist	
1992	Sue Henry	Murder on the Iditarod Trail		Winner	
1992	Mary Willis Walker	Zero at the Bone		Winner	
1992	Rebecca Rothenberg	The Bulrush Murders		Finalist	
1992	Steven Saylor	Roman Blood		Finalist	
1992	Ann Williams	Flowers for the Dead		Finalist	
1993	Barbara Neely	Blanche on the Lam		Winner	
1993	Nancy Atherton	Aunt Dimity’s Death		Finalist	
1993	Kathy Hogan Trocheck	Every Crooked Nanny		Finalist	
1994	Sharan Newman	Death Comes as Epiphany		Winner	
1994	Nevada Barr	Track of the Cat		Finalist	
1994	Deborah Crombie	A Share in Death		Finalist	
1994	Laurie R. King	A Grave Talent		Finalist	
1994	Abigail Padgett	Child of Silence		Finalist	
1995	Jeff Abbott	Do Unto Others		Winner	
1995	Janet Evanovich	One for the Money		Finalist	
1995	Lynda S. Robinson	Murder in the Place of Anubis		Finalist	
1995	April Smith	North of Montana		Finalist	
1996	Dianne Day	The Strange Files of Fremont Jones	Doubleday	Winner	
1996	Jeanne M. Dams	The Body in the Transept		Finalist	
1996	Teri Holbrook	A Far and Deadly Cry		Finalist	
1996	Jody Jaffe	Horse of a Different Killer		Finalist	
1996	Virginia Lanier	Death in Bloodhound Red		Finalist	
1997	Dale Furutani	Death in Little Tokyo	St. Martin's	Winner	
1997	Linda Fairstein	Final Jeopardy		Finalist	
1997	Anne George	Murder on a Girls’ Night Out		Finalist	
1997	Michael C. White	A Brother’s Blood		Finalist	
1998	Penny Warner	Dead Body Language	Bantam Books	Winner	
1998	Lee Child	Killing Floor	G. P. Putnam's Sons	Finalist	
1998	Aljean Harmetz	Off the Face of the Earth	Scribner	Finalist	
1998	Laura Lippman	Charm City	Avon	Finalist	
1998	Sujata Massey	The Salaryman's Wife	HarperPaperbacks	Finalist	
1999	Jerrilyn Farmer	Sympathy for the Devil	Avon	Winner	
1999	Jacqueline Fiedler	Tiger's Palette	Pocket Books	Finalist	
1999	Robin Hathaway	The Doctor Digs a Grave	St. Martin's	Finalist	
2000	Paula L. Woods	Inner City Blues	Soho Press	Winner	
2000	Donna Andrews	Murder with Peacocks	St. Martin's	Finalist	
2000	Cara Black	Murder in the Marais	Soho Press	Finalist	
2000	Kris Neri	Revenge of the Gypsy Queen	Rainbow Books	Finalist	
2001	David Liss	A Conspiracy of Paper	St. Martin's	Winner	
2001	Kate Grilley	Death Dances to a Reggae Beat	Berkley Prime Crime	Finalist	
2001	Marcia Simpson	Crow in Stolen Colors	Berkley Prime Crime	Finalist	
2001	Julie Wray Herman	Three Dirty Women and the Garden of Death	Silver Dagger Mysteries	Finalist	
2002	C. J. Box	Open Season	Henry Holt & Co.	Winner	
2002	Denise Hamilton	The Jasmine Trade	Scribner	Finalist	
2002	M.K. Preston	Perhaps She'll Die	Intrigue	Finalist	
2002	Karin Slaughter	Blindsighted	William Morrow & Co.	Finalist	
2003	Julia Spencer-Fleming	In the Bleak Midwinter	Hodder & Stoughton/Viking	Winner	
2003	Jonathon King	The Blue Edge of Midnight	Dutton	Finalist	
2003	Eddie Muller	The Distance	Scribner	Finalist	
2003	Radine Trees Nehring	A Valley To Die For	St. Kitts Press	Finalist	
2004	Jacqueline Winspear	Maisie Dobbs	Libraries Unlimited	Winner	
2004	James Hime	Night of the Dance	St. Martin's/Minotaur Books	Finalist	
2004	Rebecca C. Pawel	Death of a Nationalist	Soho Press	Finalist	
2004	Olen Steinhauer	The Bridge of Sighs	St. Martin's/Minotaur Books	Finalist	
2005	Harley Jane Kozak	Dating Dead Men	Midnight Ink	Winner	
2005	Sandra Balzo	Uncommon Grounds	Five Star	Finalist	
2005	Naomi Hirahara	Summer of the Big Bachi	Delta	Finalist	
2005	J. A. Konrath	Whiskey Sour	Hyperion	Finalist	
2005	Dylan Schaffer	Misdemeanor Man	Bloomsbury Publishing	Finalist	
2006	Brian Freeman	Immoral	St. Martin's/Minotaur Books	Winner	
2006	Mike Harrison	All Shook Up	ECW Press	Finalist	
2006	Randall Hicks	Baby Game	Wordslinger Press	Finalist	
2007	Nick Stone	Mr. Clarinet	Crum Creek	Winner	
2007	Jane K. Cleland	Consigned to Death	Minotaur Books	Finalist	
2007	Troy Cook	47 Rules of Highly Effective Bank Robbers	Capital Crime Press	Finalist	
2007	John Hart	King of Lies	Minotaur Books	Finalist	
2007	Cornelia Read	A Field of Darkness	Mysterious	Finalist	
2008	Tana French	In the Woods	W. W. Norton & Co.	Winner	
2008	Matt Beynon Rees	The Collaborator of Bethlehem	Minotaur Books	Finalist	
2008	Joe Hill	Heart-Shaped Box	Penguin	Finalist	
2008	Lisa Lutz	The Spellman Files	Hodder & Stoughton/Atria	Finalist	
2008	Tim Maleeny	Stealing the Dragon	Oceanview	Finalist	
2009	Stieg Larsson	The Girl with the Dragon Tattoo	HarperCollins / Ecco	Winner	
2009	Zoë Ferraris	Finding Nouf	Bantam Books	Finalist	
2009	G.M. Malliet	Death of a Cozy Writer	Metro	Finalist	
2009	Charlie Newton	Calumet City	McFarland & Company	Finalist	
2009	Scott Pratt	An Innocent Client	Ballantine Books	Finalist	
2009	Michael Stanley	A Carrion Death	Random House	Finalist	
2009	Dan Waddell	The Blood Detective	Soho Press	Finalist	
2010	Alan Bradley	The Sweetness at the Bottom of the Pie	Delacorte Publishing	Winner	
2010	Jamie Freveletti	Running from the Devil	William Morrow & Co.	Finalist	
2010	Sophie Littlefield	A Bad Day for Sorry	Minotaur Books	Finalist	
2010	Stuart Neville	The Ghosts of Belfast	Soho Crime	Finalist	
2010	Malla Nunn	A Beautiful Place to Die	Picador	Finalist	
2011	Bruce DeSilva	Rogue Island	Forge Books/Tom Doherty Associates	Winner	
2011	Hilary Davidson	The Damage Done	Forge Books	Finalist	
2011	Paul Doiron	The Poacher's Son	Minotaur Books	Finalist	
2011	Sasscer Hill	Full Mortality	Wildside Press	Finalist	
2011	Simon Lelic	A Thousand Cuts	Viking Press	Finalist	
2012	Leonard Rosen	All Cry Chaos	Permanent Press	Winner	
2012	Sara J. Henry	Learning to Swim	Crown	Finalist	
2012	Darrell James	Nazareth Child	Midnight Ink	Finalist	
2012	Alice LaPlante	Turn of Mind	Atlantic Monthly	Finalist	
2012	Taylor Stevens	The Informationist	Crown	Finalist	
2012	S. J. Watson	Before I Go to Sleep	Harper	Finalist	
2013	Daniel Friedman	Don't Ever Get Old	Minotaur Books – Thomas Dunne Books	Winner	
2013	Susan M. Boyer	Low Country Boil	Henery Press	Finalist	
2013	Susan Elia MacNeal	Mr. Churchill's Secretary	Random House – Bantam Books	Finalist	
2013	Chris Pavone	The Expats	Crown	Finalist	
2014	Terry Shames	A Killing at Cotton Hill	Seventh Street Books	Winner	
2014	Matt Coyle	Yesterday's Echo	Oceanview Publishing	Finalist	
2014	Becky Masterman	Rage Against the Dying	Minotaur Books	Finalist	
2014	Jenny Milchman	Cover of Snow	Ballantine Books	Finalist	
2014	Derek Miller	Norwegian by Night	Houghton Mifflin Harcourt	Finalist	
2015	Julia Dahl	Invisible City	Minotaur Books	Winner	
2015	Kristi Belcamino	Blessed Are the Dead	Witness Impulse	Finalist	
2015	Tom Bouman	Dry Bones in the Valley	W. W. Norton & Co.	Finalist	
2015	Sarah Hilary	Someone Else's Skin	Penguin Books	Finalist	
2015	Elizabeth Little	Dear Daughter	Viking Press	Finalist	
2015	Lori Rader-Day	The Black Hour	Seventh Street Books	Finalist	
2016	Glen Erik Hamilton	Past Crimes	William Morrow & Co.	Winner	
2016	Patricia Abbott	Concrete Angel	Polis	Finalist	
2016	Chris Holm	The Killing Kind	Mulholland Books	Finalist	
2016	David Joy	Where All Light Tends to Go	G. P. Putnam's Sons	Finalist	
2016	Ausma Zehanat Khan	The Unquiet Dead	Minotaur Books	Finalist	
2016	Art Taylor	On the Road with Del and Louise	Henery	Finalist	
2017	Joe Ide	IQ	Mulholland Books	Winner	
2017	Fiona Barton	The Widow	UK: Bantam Books; US: NAL	Finalist	
2017	Flynn Berry	Under the Harrow	Penguin Books	Finalist	
2017	Bill Beverly	Dodgers	No Exit Press	Finalist	
2017	Renee Patrick	Design for Dying	Forge Books	Finalist	
2018	Sheena Kamal	The Lost Ones	William Morrow & Co.	Winner	
2018	Kellye Garrett	Hollywood Homicide	Midnight Ink	Finalist	
2018	Jane Harper	The Dry	Flatiron Books	Finalist	
2018	Jordan Harper	She Rides Shotgun	Ecco Press	Finalist	
2018	Kristen Lepionka	The Last Place You Look	Minotaur Books	Finalist	
2018	Wendall Thomas	Lost Luggage	Poisoned Pen Press	Finalist	
2019	John Copenhaver	Dodging and Burning	Pegasus Books	Winner	
2019	Oyinkan Braithwaite	My Sister, the Serial Killer	Doubleday	Finalist	
2019	Delia Owens	Where the Crawdads Sing	G. P. Putnam's Sons	Finalist	
2019	Catherine Steadman	Something in the Water	Ballantine Books	Finalist	
2019	C.J. Tudor	The Chalk Man	Crown	Finalist	
2020	Tara Laskowski	One Night Gone	Graydon House Books	Winner	
2020	Samantha Downing	My Lovely Wife	Penguin Books	Finalist	
2020	Tori Eldridge	The Ninja Daughter	Agora Books	Finalist	
2020	Angie Kim	Miracle Creek	Sarah Crichton Books	Finalist	
2020	J. P. Pomare	Call Me Evie	G. P. Putnam's Sons	Finalist	
2020	Lauren Wilkinson	American Spy	Random House	Finalist	
2021	David Heska Wanbli Weiden	Winter Counts	Ecco Press	Winner	
2021	Deepa Anappara	Djinn Patrol on the Purple Line	Random House	Finalist	
2021	Nev March	Murder in Old Bombay	Minotaur Books	Finalist	
2021	Richard Osman	The Thursday Murder Club	Pamela Dorman Books	Finalist	
2021	Stephanie Wrobel	Darling Rose Gold	Berkley Books	Finalist	
2022	Mia P. Manansala	Arsenic and Adobo	Berkley Books	Winner	
2022	Alexandra Andrews	Who Is Maude Dixon?	Little, Brown, & Co.	Finalist	
2022	Abigail Dean	Girl A	Viking Press	Finalist	
2022	Erin Flanagan	Deer Season	University of Nebraska Press	Finalist	
2022	Wanda M. Morris	All Her Little Secrets	William Morrow & Co.	Finalist	

== Best Mystery Nonfiction/Critical ==
The Macavity Award for Best Mystery Non-fiction/Critical Book was established in 1987. This category has had multiple names since its inception and reviews the best mystery-related critical, biographical, and otherwise nonfiction titles.

Best Mystery Nonfiction/Critical winners and finalists
Year	Author	Title	Publisher	Result	Ref.
1987	Marcia Muller and Bill Pronzini	1001 Midnights		Winner	
1988	Bill Pronzini	Son of Gun in Cheek		Winner	
1989	Victoria Nichols and Susan Thompson	Silk Stalkings		Winner	
1990	H. R. F. Keating	The Bedside Companion to Crime		Winner	
1991	Gillian Gill	Agatha Christie: The Woman and Her Mysteries		Winner	
1992	Tony Hillerman and Ernie Bulow	Talking Mysteries: A Conversation with Tony Hillerman		Winner	
1993	Ellen Nehr	Doubleday Crime Club Compendium	Doubleday	Winner	
1994	Ed Gorman (ed.)	The Fine Art of Murder		Winner	
1995	Dean James and Jean Swanson	By a Woman's Hand		Winner	
1996	Willetta L. Heising	Detecting Women	Purple Moon	Winner	
1997	Willetta Heising	Detecting Women 2	Purple Moon Press	Winner	
1998	Jan Grape, Dean James, and Ellen Nehr	Deadly Women	Carroll & Graf	Winner	
1998	Ben Macintyre	The Napoleon of Crime: Life and Times of Adam Worth, Master Thief	Farrar, Straus & Giroux	Finalist	
1998	Natalie Kaufman and Carol Kay	G Is for Grafton	Henry Holt & Co.	Finalist	
1998	Ian Ousby	Guilty Parties: A Mystery Lover's Companion	Thames & Hudson	Finalist	
1999	Jean Swanson and Dean James	Killer Books	Berkley Books	Winner	
1999	Alzina Stone Dale	Mystery Reader's Walking Guide to Washington, DC	Passport Books	Finalist	
1999	Ed Gorman and Martin Greenberg	Speaking of Murder	Berkley Books	Finalist	
1999	Eddie Muller	Dark City: The Lost World of Film Noir	St. Martin's	Finalist	
1999	Victoria Nichols and Susan Thompson	Silk Stalkings II	Scarecrow	Finalist	
2000	Tom Nolan	Ross Macdonald	Penguin Rough Guides	Winner	
2000	Jo Grossman and Robert Weibezahl (eds.)	A Taste of Murder	Dell	Finalist	
2000	Daniel Stashower	Teller of Tales: The Life of Arthur Conan Doyle	Henry Holt & Co.	Finalist	
2001	Marvin Lachman	The American Regional Mystery	Minotaur Books	Winner	
2001	Martin Booth	The Doctor and the Detective: A Biography of Sir Arthur Conan Doyle	Thomas Dunne Books/St. Martin's/Minotaur Books	Finalist	
2001	Margaret Caldwell Thomas	essays	Thomas Dunne Books/St. Martin's/Minotaur Books	Finalist	
2001	Martha Hailey Dubose	Women of Mystery: the Lives and Works of Notable Women Crime Novelists	Ellery Queen's Mystery Magazine, January 2000	Finalist	
2001	Jim Huang (ed.)	100 Favorite Mysteries of the Century	Crum Creek Press	Finalist	
2002	G. Miki Hayden	Writing the Mystery: A Start to Finish Guide for Both Novice and Professional	Howdunit Series, Writers Digest Books	Winner	
2002	Max Allan Collins	The War of the World Murders	Collectors Press	Finalist	
2002	Michael J. Hayde	My Name's Friday: The Unauthorized but True Story of Dragnet and the Films of Jack Webb	Cumberland House	Finalist	
2002	Tony Hillerman	Seldom Disappointed: A Memoir	HarperCollins	Finalist	
2002	Jeffrey Marks	Who Was that Lady? Craig Rice: The Queen of Screwball Mystery	Delphi Books	Finalist	
2003	Jim Huang (ed.)	They Died in Vain: Overlooked, Underappreciated, and Forgotten Mystery Novels	William Morrow & Co.	Winner	
2003	Mike Ashley	The Mammoth Encyclopedia of Crime Fiction	Carroll & Graf	Finalist	
2003	Jeff Marks	Intent to Sell: Marketing the Genre Novel	Deadly Alibi Press	Finalist	
2003	Eddie Muller	The Art of Noir: The Posters and Graphics from the Classic Era of Film Noir	The Overlook Press	Finalist	
2004	Gary Warren Niebuhr	Make Mine a Mystery: A Reader's Guide to Mystery and Detective Fiction	G. P. Putnam's Sons	Winner	
2004	Colleen A Barnett	Mystery Women: An Encyclopedia of Leading Women Characters in Mystery Fiction, Vol. 3	Poisoned Pen Press	Finalist	
2004	Jo Grossman and Robert Weibezahl	A Second Helping of Murder: More Diabolically Delicious Recipes from Contemporary Mystery Writers	Poisoned Pen Press	Finalist	
2004	Andrew Wilson	Beautiful Shadow: A Life of Patricia Highsmith	Bloomsbury Publishing	Finalist	
2005	D. P. Lyle, MD	Forensics for Dummies	William Morrow & Co.	Winner	
2005	Frankie Y. Bailey and Steven Chermak	Famous American Crimes & Trials, Vol. 1	Praeger Publishers	Finalist	
2005	Jim Doherty	Just the Facts: True Tales of Cops & Criminals	Deadly Serious Press	Finalist	
2005	Leslie S. Klinger	The New Annotated Sherlock Holmes: The Complete Short Stories	W. W. Norton	Finalist	
2005	Darrell B. Lockhart	Latin American Mystery Writers: An A-to-Z Guide	Greenwood Press	Finalist	
2006	Melanie Rehak	Girl Sleuth: Nancy Drew and the Women Who Created Her	Columbia University Press	Winner	
2006	Jonathan Goodman	Tracks to Murder	Kent State University Press	Finalist	
2006	Stuart Kaminsky with Laurie Roberts (photo)	Behind the Mystery: Top Mystery Writers Interviewed	Hothouse Press	Finalist	
2006	Leslie S. Klinger (ed.)	New Annotated Sherlock Holmes: The Novels	W. W. Norton & Co.	Finalist	
2006	Mary Roach	Spook: Science Tackles the Afterlife	W. W. Norton & Co.	Finalist	
2007	Jim Huang and Austin Lugar (eds.)	Mystery Muses: 100 Classics That Inspire Today's Mystery Writers	Five Star	Winner	
2007	Chris Roerden	Don't Murder Your Mystery: 24 Fiction Writing Techniques to Save Your Manuscript From Ending Up D.O.A.	Bella Rosa Books	Finalist	
2007	Daniel Stashower	The Beautiful Cigar Girl: Mary Rogers, Edgar Allan Poe, and the Invention of Murder	Dutton	Finalist	
2008	Roger Sobin (ed.)	The Essential Mystery Lists: For Readers, Collectors, and Librarians	Harcourt	Winner	
2008	Barry Forshaw	Rough Guide to Crime Fiction	McFarland & Co.	Finalist	
2008	Jean Gould O'Connell	Chester Gould: A Daughter's Biography of the Creator of Dick Tracy	Michael Joseph/ Delacorte	Finalist	
2008	Jon Lellenberg, Daniel Stashower, and Charles Foley (eds.)	Arthur Conan Doyle: A Life in Letters	Walker	Finalist	
2008	Lee Lofland	Police Procedure and Investigation: A Guide for Writers	HarperPress/Penguin	Finalist	
2009	Frankie Y. Bailey	African American Mystery Writers: A Historical & Thematic Study	Onyx	Winner	
2009	Leonard Cassuto	Hard-Boiled Sentimentality: The Secret History of American Crime Stories		Finalist	
2009	Kathy Lynn Emerson	How to Write Killer Historical Mysteries	St. Martin's	Finalist	
2009	David Geherin	Scene of the Crime: The Importance of Place in Crime and Mystery Fiction	Bleak House Books	Finalist	
2009	Harry Lee Poe	Edgar Allan Poe: An Illustrated Companion to His Tell-Tale Stories	Houghton Mifflin Harcourt	Finalist	
2009	Kate Summerscale	The Suspicions of Mr. Whicher: A Shocking Murder and the Undoing of a Great Victorian Detective	Poisoned Pen Press	Finalist	
2010	P.D. James	Talking About Detective Fiction	Alfred A. Knopf	Winner	
2010	John Buntin	L.A. Noir: The Struggle for the Soul of America's Most Seductive City	Random House: Harmony Books	Finalist	
2010	Craig McDonald	Rogue Males: Conversations & Confrontations About the Writing Life	Bleak House Books	Finalist	
2010	Otto Penzler (ed.)	The Line Up: The World's Greatest Crime Writers Tell the Inside Story of Their Greatest Detectives	Little, Brown, & Co.	Finalist	
2010	Laney Salisbury and Aly Sujo	Provenance: How a Con Man and a Forger Rewrote the History of Modern Art	Penguin Books	Finalist	
2010	Elena Santangelo	Dame Agatha's Shorts: An Agatha Christie Short Story Companion	Bella Rosa Books	Finalist	
2011	John Curran	Agatha Christie's Secret Notebooks: Fifty Years of Mysteries in the Making	HarperCollins	Winner	
2011	Deborah Blum	The Poisoner's Handbook: Murder and the Birth of Forensic Medicine in Jazz Age New York	Penguin Books	Finalist	
2011	Yunte Huang	Charlie Chan: The Untold Story of the Honorable Detective and His Rendezvous with American History	W. W. Norton & Co.	Finalist	
2011	Maxim Jakubowski (ed.)	Following the Detectives: Real Locations in Crime Fiction	New Holland	Finalist	
2011	David Morrell and Hank W. Wagner (eds.)	Thrillers: 100 Must Reads	Oceanview Publishing	Finalist	
2012	Charlaine Harris	The Sookie Stackhouse Companion	Ace Books	Winner	
2012	Leslie Budewitz	Books, Crooks and Counselors: How to Write Accurately About Criminal Law and Courtroom Procedure	Linden	Finalist	
2012	John Curran	Agatha Christie: Murder in the Making: More Stories and Secrets from Her Notebooks	HarperCollins	Finalist	
2012	A.B. Emrys	Wilkie Collins, Vera Caspary and the Evolution of the Casebook Novel	McFarland & Company	Finalist	
2012	T. J. English	The Savage City: Race, Murder, and a Generation on the Edge	William Morrow & Co.	Finalist	
2013	John Connolly and Declan Burke (eds.)	Books to Die For: The World's Greatest Mystery Writers on the World's Greatest Mystery Novels	Simon & Schuster – Atria/Emily Bestler	Winner	
2013	Paul French	Midnight in Peking: How the Murder of a Young Englishwoman Haunted the Last Days of Old China	Penguin Books	Finalist	
2013	Otto Penzler (ed.)	In Pursuit of Spenser: Mystery Writers on Robert B. Parker and the Creation of an American Hero	BenBella/Smart Pop	Finalist	
2014	Daniel Stashower	The Hour of Peril: The Secret Plot to Murder Lincoln Before the Civil War	Minotaur Books	Winner	
2014	Roseanne Montillo	The Lady and Her Monsters: A Tale of Dissections, Real-Life Dr. Frankensteins, and the Creation of Mary Shelley's Masterpiece	William Morrow & Co.	Finalist	
2014	Charles J. Rzepka	Being Cool: The Work of Elmore Leonard	Johns Hopkins University Press	Finalist	
2015	Hank Phillippi Ryan (ed.)	Writes of Passage: Adventures on the Writer's Journey	Henery Press	Winner	
2015	Charles Brownson	The Figure of the Detective: A Literary History and Analysis	McFarland & Company	Finalist	
2015	J.W. Ocker	Poe-Land: The Hallowed Haunts of Edgar Allan Poe	Countryman	Finalist	
2015	Adam Plantinga	400 Things Cops Know: Street Smart Lessons from a Veteran Patrolman	Quill Driver	Finalist	
2016	Martin Edwards	The Golden Age of Murder: The Mystery of the Writers Who Invented the Modern Detective Story	HarperCollins	Winner	
2016	Kathryn Harkup	A Is For Arsenic: The Poisons of Agatha Christie	Bloomsbury Sigma	Finalist	
2016	Suzanne Marrs and Tom Nolan (eds.)	Meanwhile There Are Letters: The Correspondence of Eudora Welty and Ross Macdonald	Arcade	Finalist	
2016	Val McDermid	Forensics: What Bugs, Burns, Prints, DNA, and More Tell Us About Crime	Grove Press	Finalist	
2016	Nathan Ward	The Lost Detective: Becoming Dashiell Hammett	Bloomsbury Publishing	Finalist	
2017	Margaret Kinsman	Sara Paretsky: A Companion to the Mystery Fiction	McFarland & Company	Winner	
2017	Jane K. Cleland	Mastering Suspense, Structure, and Plot: How to Write Gripping Stories that Keep Readers on the Edge of Their Seats	Writer's Digest Books	Finalist	
2017	Ruth Franklin	Shirley Jackson: A Rather Haunted Life	Liveright Publishing	Finalist	
2017	David J. Skal	Something in the Blood: The Untold Story of Bram Stoker, the Man Who Wrote Dracula	Liveright Publishing	Finalist	
2017	Kate Summerscale	The Wicked Boy: The Mystery of a Victorian Child Murderer	Penguin Books	Finalist	
2018	Martin Edwards	The Story of Classic Crime in 100 Books	Poisoned Pen Press/British Library	Winner	
2018	Mattias Bostrom	From Holmes to Sherlock: The Story of the Men and Women Who Created an Icon	Mysterious Press	Finalist	
2018	Lawrence P. Jackson	Chester B. Himes: A Biography	W. W. Norton & Co.	Finalist	
2018	Bill James and Rachel McCarthy James	The Man From the Train: The Solving of a Century-Old Serial Killer Mystery	Scribner	Finalist	
2018	Michael Sims	Arthur and Sherlock: Conan Doyle and the Creation of Holmes	Bloomsbury	Finalist	
2018	Tori Telfer	Lady Killers: Deadly Women Throughout History	Harper Perennial	Finalist	
2019	Sarah Weinman	The Real Lolita: The Kidnapping of Sally Horner and the Novel That Scandalized the World	HarperCollins	Winner	
2019	Laird R. Blackwell	The Metaphysical Mysteries of G.K. Chesterton: A Critical Study of the Father Brown Stories and Other Detective Fiction	McFarland & Company	Finalist	
2019	Margalit Fox	Conan Doyle for the Defense: The True Story of a Sensational British Murder, a Quest for Justice, and the World's Most Famous Detective Writer	Random House	Finalist	
2019	Leslie S. Klinger	Classic American Crime Fiction of the 1920s	Pegasus Books	Finalist	
2019	Michelle McNamara	I'll Be Gone in the Dark: One Woman's Obsessive Search for the Golden State Killer	HarperCollins	Finalist	
2019	Laura Thompson	Agatha Christie: A Mysterious Life	Pegasus Books	Finalist	
2020	John Billheimer	Hitchcock and the Censors	University Press of Kentucky	Winner	
2020	Laird R. Blackwell	Frederic Dannay	Ellery Queen's Mystery Magazine and the Art of the Detective Short Story, McFarland & Company	Finalist	
2020	Ursula Buchan	Beyond the Thirty-Nine Steps: A Life of John Buchan	Bloomsbury Publishing	Finalist	
2020	Peter Houlahan	Norco '80: The True Story of the Most Spectacular Bank Robbery	American History, Counterpoint	Finalist	
2020	Mo Moulton	The Mutual Admiration Society: How Dorothy L. Sayers and Her Oxford Circle Remade the World for Women	Basic Books	Finalist	
2020	James Polchin	Indecent Advances: A Hidden History of True Crime and Prejudice Before Stonewall	Counterpoint	Finalist	
2021	Sheila Mitchell	H.R.F. Keating: A Life of Crime	Level Best Books	Winner	
2021	Leslie Brody	Sometimes You Have to Lie: The Life and Times of Louise Fitzhugh, Renegade Author of Harriet the Spy	Seal Press	Finalist	
2021	Martin Edwards (ed.)	Howdunit: A Masterclass in Crime Writing by Members of the Detection Club	HarperCollins	Finalist	
2021	Erin E. MacDonald	Ian Rankin: A Companion to the Mystery Fiction	McFarland & Company	Finalist	
2021	Craig Sisterson	Southern Cross Crime: The Pocket Essential Guide to the Crime Fiction, Film & TV of Australia and New Zealand	Oldcastle Books	Finalist	
2022	Lee Child with Laurie R. King	How to Write a Mystery: A Handbook from Mystery Writers of America	Scribner	Winner	
2022	Mark Aldridge	Agatha Christie's Poirot: The Greatest Detective in the World	HarperCollins	Finalist	
2022	Margalit Fox	The Confidence Men: How Two Prisoners of War Engineered the Most Remarkable Escape in History	Random House	Finalist	
2022	Richard Greene	The Unquiet Englishman: A Life of Graham Greene	W. W. Norton & Co.	Finalist	
2022	James McGrath Morris	Tony Hillerman: A Life	University of Oklahoma Press	Finalist	
2022	John Tresch	The Reason for the Darkness of the Night: Edgar Allan Poe and the Forging of American Science	Farrar, Straus and Giroux	Finalist	
2022	Edward White	The Twelve Lives of Alfred Hitchcock: An Anatomy of the Master of Suspense	W. W. Norton & Co.	Finalist	

== Best Mystery Short Story ==
The Macavity Award for Best Mystery Short Story was first awarded in 1987.

Best Mystery Short Story winners and finalists
Year	Author	Title	Publication	Result	Ref.
1987	Sue Grafton	The Parker Shotgun	Mean Streets	Winner	
1988	Robert Barnard	The Woman in the Wardrobe	Ellery Queen's Mystery Magazine, December 1987	Winner	
1989	Doug Allyn	Deja Vu	Alfred Hitchcock's Mystery Magazine, June 1988	Winner	
1989	Carl Martin	Fatherly Love	Ellery Queen's Mystery Magazine, July 1988	Finalist	
1990	Nancy Pickard	Afraid All the Time	Sisters in Crime	Winner	
1990	Brendan DuBois	Fire Burning Bright	Alfred Hitchcock's Mystery Magazine, Winter 1989	Finalist	
1990	Jeremiah Healy	One Eye Open	Ellery Queen's Mystery Magazine, July 1989	Finalist	
1990	Donald E. Westlake	Too Many Crooks	Playboy, August 1989	Finalist	
1991	Joan Hess	Too Much to Bare	Sisters in Crime 2	Winner	
1992	Margaret Maron	Deborah's Judgement	A Woman’s Eye	Winner	
1992	Joe Gores	Dance of the Dead	The Armchair Detective, Spring 1991	Finalist	
1992	Carolyn Wheat	Life, for Short	Sisters in Crime 4	Finalist	
1993	Carolyn Hart	Henrie O's Holiday	Malice Domestic 1	Winner	
1993	Joan Hess	The Last to Know	Malice Domestic 1	Finalist	
1993	Charles McCarry	The Hand of Carlos	The Armchair Detective, Fall 1992	Finalist	
1994	Susan Dunlap	Checkout	Malice Domestic 2	Winner	
1994	M. D. Lake	Kim's Game	Malice Domestic 2	Finalist	
1995	Deborah Adams	Cast Your Fate to the Wind	Malice Domestic 3	Winner	
1995	Jan Burke	Unharmed	Ellery Queen's Mystery Magazine, Mid-December 1994	Winner	
1996	Colin Dexter	Evans Tries an O-Level	Morse's Greatest Mystery (Crown)	Winner	
1996	K. K. Beck	Rule of Law	Malice Domestic 4	Finalist	
1996	Dorothy Cannell	Cupid's Arrow	Crimes of the Heart	Finalist	
1997	Carolyn Wheat	Cruel & Unusual	Guilty As Charged (Pocket Books)	Winner	
1997	Joyce Christmas	Takeout	Malice Domestic 5	Finalist	
1997	Jill Churchill	The Bun Also Rises	Malice Domestic 5	Finalist	
1997	Michael Malone	Red Clay	Murder for Love	Finalist	
1997	Rosemarie Santini	The Music Lesson	New Mystery, Number 9, 1996	Finalist	
1998	Peter Robinson	Two Ladies of Rose Cottage	Malice Domestic 6 (Pocket Books)	Winner	
1998	William Bankier	Real Bullets This Time	Ellery Queen's Mystery Magazine, July 1997	Finalist	
1998	Stuart Kaminsky	Find Miriam	New Mystery Magazine, Summer 1997	Finalist	
1998	Edward Marston and Peter Lovesey	The Corbett Correspondence	Malice Domestic 6 (Pocket Books)	Finalist	
1998	Polly Whitney	Etiquette Lesson	Murderous Intent Mystery Magazine	Finalist	
1999	Barbara D'Amato	Of Course You Know That Chocolate Is a Vegetable	Ellery Queen's Mystery Magazine, Nov. 98	Winner	
1999	Laurien Berenson	Sleeping Dogs Lie	Canine Crimes (Ballantine Books)	Finalist	
1999	Harlan Coben	A Simple Philosophy	Malice Domestic 7 (Avon)	Finalist	
1999	Dean James	The Village Vampire & the Oboe of Death	Malice Domestic 7 (Avon)	Finalist	
2000	Kate Grilley	Maubi and the Jumbies	The Strand Magazine, Spring 2007	Winner	
2000	Laurie King	Paleta Man	Irreconcilable Differences, edited by Lia Matera (HarperCollins)	Finalist	
2000	Anne Perry	Heroes	Murder & Obsession, edited by Otto Penzler (Delacorte Press)	Finalist	
2000	Carolyn Wheat	Show Me the Bones	Diagnosis Dead, edited by Jonathan Kellerman (Pocket Books)	Finalist	
2001	Reginald Hill	A Candle for Christmas	Ellery Queen's Mystery Magazine, Sep-Oct 2007	Winner	
2001	Jan Burke	The Man in the Civil Suit	Malice Domestic 9 (Avon)	Finalist	
2001	Joyce Christmas	The Chosen	Unholy Orders (Intrigue Press)	Finalist	
2002	Jan Burke	The Abbey Ghosts	Ellery Queen's Mystery Magazine, March 2003	Winner	
2002	Katherine Hall Page	The Would-Be Widower	Malice Domestic 10, edited by Nevada Barr (Avon)	Finalist	
2002	Ted Hertel	My Bonnie Lies	The Mammoth Book of Legal Thrillers, edited by Michael Hemmingson (Carroll & Graf)	Finalist	
2002	Rochelle Krich	Bitter Waters	Criminal Kabbalah, edited by Lawrence W. Raphael (Jewish Lights)	Finalist	
2003	Janet Dawson	Voice Mail	Harper / Headline	Winner	
2003	Diana Deverell	Boot Scoot	Alfred Hitchcock's Mystery Magazine, October 2002	Finalist	
2003	Brendan DuBois	An Empire's Reach	Alfred Hitchcock's Mystery Magazine, November 2002	Finalist	
2003	Toni L.P. Kelner	Bible Belt	Ellery Queen's Mystery Magazine, June 2002	Finalist	
2003	Marcia Talley	Too Many Cooks	Much Ado About Murder, edited by Anne Perry (Berkley Prime Crime)	Finalist	
2003	Carolyn Wheat	The Adventure of the Rara Avis	Murder, My Dear Watson, edited by Martin H. Greenberg, Jon Lellenberg, and Daniel Stashower (Carroll & Graf)	Finalist	
2004	Sandy Balzo	The Grass Is Always Greener	Ellery Queen's Mystery Magazine, Feb 2007	Winner	
2004	Robert Barnard	Rogues Gallery	Ellery Queen's Mystery Magazine, March 2003	Finalist	
2004	Diana Deverell	Texas Two-Step	Alfred Hitchcock's Mystery Magazine, February 2003	Finalist	
2004	Beth Foxwell	No Man's Land	Blood On Their Hands, edited by Lawrence Block (Berkley Prime Crime)	Finalist	
2004	G. Miki Hayden	War Crimes	A Hot and Sultry Night for Crime, edited by Jeffery Deaver (Berkley Prime Crime)	Finalist	
2004	Ronnie Klaskin	Child Support	A Hot and Sultry Night for Crime, edited by Jeffery Deaver (Berkley Prime Crime)	Finalist	
2004	Elaine Viets	Red Meat	Blood On Their Hands, edited by Lawrence Block (Berkley Prime Crime)	Finalist	
2005	Terence Faherty	The Widow of Slane	Ellery Queen's Mystery Magazine, Sept-Oct 2005	Winner	
2005	Sandra Balzo	Viscery	Ellery Queen's Mystery Magazine, December 2004	Finalist	
2005	Alana White	The Lady's Not for Dying	Futures Mystery Anthology Magazine, Winter 2004	Finalist	
2006	Nancy Pickard	There Is No Crime on Easter Island	Scam and Eggs, Five Star	Winner	
2006	Robert Barnard	Everybody's Girl	Ellery Queen's Mystery Magazine, May 2005	Finalist	
2006	David Corbett	It Can Happen	San Francisco Noir, Akashic Books	Finalist	
2006	Steve Hockensmith	The Big Road	Alfred Hitchcock's Mystery Magazine, May 2005	Finalist	
2007	Tim Maleeny	Til Death Do Us Part	MWA Presents Death Do Us Part: New Stories About Love, Lust, and Murder, edited by Harlan Coben (Little, Brown & Co.)	Winner	
2007	Robert Barnard	Provenance	Ellery Queen's Mystery Magazine, Jul 2006	Finalist	
2007	Roberta Isleib	Disturbance in the Field	Seasmoke: Crime Stories by New England Writers, edited by Kate Flora, Ruth McCarty, and Susan Oleksiw (Level Best Books)	Finalist	
2008	Rhys Bowen	Please Watch Your Step	Hardly Knew Her (William Morrow & Co.)	Winner	
2008	Donna Andrews	A Rat's Tale	Ellery Queen's Mystery Magazine, Sept/Oct 2007	Finalist	
2008	Jon L. Breen	The Missing Elevator Puzzle	Wolfsbane & Mistletoe, edited by Harris & Kelner (Penguin)	Finalist	
2008	Beverle Graves Myers	Brimstone P.I.	Wolfsbane & Mistletoe, edited by Harris & Kelner (Penguin)	Finalist	
2008	Gillian Roberts	The Old Wife's Tale	Ellery Queen's Mystery Magazine, March/April 2004	Finalist	
2009	Dana Cameron	The Night Things Changed	Ellery Queen's Mystery Magazine, Mar/Apr 2007	Winner	
2009	Sean Chercover	A Sleep Not Unlike Death	Ellery Queen's Mystery Magazine, Sep/Oct 2008	Finalist	
2009	Toni L.P. Kelner	Keeping Watch Over His Flock	Murderous Intent, Fall 1999	Finalist	
2009	Laura Lippman	Scratch a Woman	Alfred Hitchcock's Mystery Magazine, Jan 2001	Finalist	
2009	Tom Piccirilli	Between the Dark and the Daylight	Alfred Hitchcock's Mystery Magazine, May 2007	Finalist	
2010	Hank Phillippi Ryan	On the House	Quarry: Crime Stories by New England Writers, Level Best Books	Winner	
2010	Ace Atkins	Last Fair Deal Gone Down	Crossroad Blues, Busted Flush Press	Finalist	
2010	Dana Cameron	Femme Sole	Boston Noir, Akashic Books	Finalist	
2010	Jim Fusilli	Digby, Attorney at Law	Alfred Hitchcock's Mystery Magazine, May 2009	Finalist	
2010	Carolyn Hart	Your Turn	Two of the Deadliest, Harper	Finalist	
2010	Marcus Sakey	The Desert Here and the Desert Far Away	Thriller 2: Stories You Just Can't Put Down, Mira	Finalist	
2010	Luis Alberto Urrea	Amapola	Phoenix Noir, Akashic Books	Finalist	
2011	Dana Cameron	Swing Shift	Crimes by Moonlight: Mysteries from the Dark Side, Berkley Books	Winner	
2011	Doug Allyn	The Scent of Lilacs	Ellery Queen's Mystery Magazine	Finalist	
2011	Keith Gilman	Devil's Pocket	Philadelphia Noir, Akashic Books	Finalist	
2011	Richard Helms	The Gods for Vengeance Cry	Ellery Queen's Mystery Magazine	Finalist	
2011	G.M. Malliet	Bookworm	Chesapeake Crimes: They Had It Comin', Wildside Press	Finalist	
2012	Dana Cameron	Disarming	Ellery Queen's Mystery Magazine, June 2011	Winner	
2012	Trina Corey	Facts Exhibiting Wantonness	Ellery Queen's Mystery Magazine, Nov. 2011	Finalist	
2012	Daryl Wood Gerber	Palace by the Lake	Fish Tales: The Guppy Anthology, Wildside Press	Finalist	
2012	Barb Goffman	Truth and Consequences	Mystery Times Ten, Buddhapuss Ink	Finalist	
2012	Kathleen Ryan	Heat of Passion	A Twist of Noir, Feb. 14, 2011	Finalist	
2012	Peter Turnbull	The Man Who Took His Hat Off to the Driver of the Train	Ellery Queen's Mystery Magazine, March/April 2011	Finalist	
2013	Barb Goffman	The Lord Is My Shamus	Chesapeake Crimes: This Job Is Murder, Wildside Press	Winner	
2013	Jeffrey Deaver	The Sequel	The Strand Magazine, November 2012-February 2013	Finalist	
2013	Jim Fusilli	Blind Justice	Mystery Writers of America Presents Vengeance, Little, Brown, & Co. – Mulholland Books	Finalist	
2013	Karin Slaughter	The Unremarkable Heart	Mystery Writers of America Presents Vengeance, Little, Brown, & Co. – Mulholland Books	Finalist	
2013	B.K. Stevens	Thea's First Husband	Alfred Hitchcock's Mystery Magazine, June 2012	Finalist	
2013	Art Taylor	When Duty Calls	Chesapeake Crimes: This Job Is Murder, Wildside Press	Finalist	
2014	Art Taylor	The Care and Feeding of Houseplants	Ellery Queen's Mystery Magazine, March/April 2013	Winner	
2014	Reed Farrel Coleman	The Terminal	Kwik Krimes, edited by Otto Penzler, Thomas & Mercer	Finalist	
2014	John Connolly	The Caxton Private Lending Library & Book Depository	Bibliomysteries: Short Tales About Deadly Books, edited by Otto Penzler, Bookspan	Finalist	
2014	Martin Limon	The Dragon's Tail	Nightmare Range: The Collected Sueno and Bascom Short Stories, Soho Books	Finalist	
2014	Gigi Pandian	The Hindi Houdini	Fish Nets: The Second Guppy Anthology, edited by Ramona DeFelice Long, Wildside Press	Finalist	
2014	Travis Richardson	Incident on the 405	The Malfeasance Occasional: Girl Trouble, edited by Clare Toohey, Macmillan	Finalist	
2015	Craig Faustus Buck	Honeymoon Sweet	Murder at the Beach: The Bouchercon Anthology 2014, edited by Dana Cameron, Down & Out	Winner	
2015	Barb Goffman	The Shadow Knows	Chesapeake Crimes: Homicidal Holidays, edited by Donna Andrews, Barb Goffman, and Marcia Talley, Wildside Press	Finalist	
2015	Paul D. Marks	Howling at the Moon	Ellery Queen's Mystery Magazine, Nov. 2014	Finalist	
2015	Travis Richardson	The Proxy	Thuglit #13, Sept./Oct. 2014	Finalist	
2015	Art Taylor	The Odds Are Against Us	Ellery Queen's Mystery Magazine, Nov. 2014	Finalist	
2016	Megan Abbott	The Little Men	MysteriousPress.com/Open Road	Winner	
2016	Mat Coward	On Borrowed Time	Ellery Queen's Mystery Magazine, June 2015	Finalist	
2016	Loren D. Estleman	Sob Sister	Detroit Is Our Beat: Tales of the Four Horsemen, Tyrus	Finalist	
2016	Barb Goffman	A Year Without Santa Claus	Alfred Hitchcock's Mystery Magazine, January/February 2015	Finalist	
2016	Travis Richardson	Quack and Dwight	Jewish Noir, edited by Kenneth Wishnia, PM Press	Finalist	
2016	B.K. Stevens	A Joy Forever	Alfred Hitchcock's Mystery Magazine, March 2015	Finalist	
2017	Art Taylor	Parallel Play	Chesapeake Crimes: Storm Warning, Wildside Press	Winner	
2017	Lawrence Block	Autumn at the Automat	In Sunlight or in Shadow, Pegasus Books	Finalist	
2017	Craig Faustus Buck	Blank Shot	Black Coffee, Darkhouse Books	Finalist	
2017	Greg Herren	Survivor's Guilt	Blood on the Bayou: Bouchercon Anthology 2016, Down & Out Books	Finalist	
2017	Paul D. Marks	Ghosts of Bunker Hill	Ellery Queen's Mystery Magazine, Dec. 2016	Finalist	
2017	Joyce Carol Oates	The Crawl Space	Ellery Queen's Mystery Magazine, Sept.-Oct. 2016	Finalist	
2018	Paul D. Marks	Windward	Coast to Coast: Private Eyes from Sea to Shining Sea, Down & Out Books	Winner	
2018	Craig Faustus Buck	As Ye Sow	Passport to Murder: Bouchercon Anthology 2017, Down and Out Books	Finalist	
2018	Matt Coyle	The #2 Pencil	Coast to Coast: Private Eyes from Sea to Shining Sea, Down & Out Books	Finalist	
2018	Terence Faherty	Infinite Uticas	Ellery Queen's Mystery Magazine, May/June 2017	Finalist	
2018	Barb Goffman	Whose Wine Is it Anyway?	50 Shades of Cabernet, Koehler Books	Finalist	
2018	Art Taylor	A Necessary Ingredient	Coast to Coast: Private Eyes from Sea to Shining Sea, Down & Out Books	Finalist	
2019	Art Taylor	English 398: Fiction Workshop	Ellery Queen's Mystery Magazine, Jul/Aug 2018	Winner	
2019	Craig Faustus Buck	Race to Judgment	Ellery Queen's Mystery Magazine, Nov/Dec 2018	Finalist	
2019	Leslie Budewitz	All God's Sparrows	Alfred Hitchcock's Mystery Magazine, May/Jun 2018	Finalist	
2019	Barb Goffman	Bug Appétit	Ellery Queen's Mystery Magazine, Nov/Dec 2018	Finalist	
2019	Barry Lancet	Three-Star Sushi	Down & Out: The Magazine, Vol.1, No. 3	Finalist	
2019	Gigi Pandian	The Cambodian Curse	The Cambodian Curse and Other Stories	Finalist	
2020	Art Taylor	Better Days	Ellery Queen's Mystery Magazine, May/June 2019	Winner	
2020	Michael Chandos	West Texas Barbecue	The Eyes of Texas, edited by Michael Bracken (Down & Out Books)	Finalist	
2020	Terence Faherty	The Cardboard Box	Ellery Queen's Mystery Magazine, Jan/Feb 2019	Finalist	
2020	Barb Goffman	Alex's Choice	Crime Travel, edited by Barb Goffman(Wildside Press)	Finalist	
2020	G.M. Malliet	Whiteout	Ellery Queen's Mystery Magazine, Jan/Feb 2019	Finalist	
2020	Dave Zeltserman	Brother's Keeper	Ellery Queen's Mystery Magazine, May/June 2019	Finalist	
2021	Gabriel Valjan	Elysian Fields	California Schemin': The 2020 Bouchercon Anthology, edited by Art Taylor (Wildside Press)	Winner	
2021	Barb Goffman	Dear Emily Etiquette	Ellery Queen's Mystery Magazine, Sept/Oct 2020	Finalist	
2021	Art Taylor	The Boy Detective & The Summer of ‘74	Alfred Hitchcock's Mystery Magazine, Jan/Feb 2020	Finalist	
2021	Elaine Viets	Dog Eat Dog	The Beat of Black Wings: Crime Fiction Inspired by the Songs of Joni Mitchell, edited by Josh Pachter (Untreed Reads Publishing)	Finalist	
2021	James W. Ziskin	The Twenty-Five Year Engagement	In League with Sherlock Holmes: Stories Inspired by the Sherlock Holmes Canon, edited by Laurie R. King (Pegasus Crime)	Finalist	
2022	Richard Helms	Sweeps Week	Ellery Queen's Mystery Magazine, July/August 2021	Winner	
2022	Tracy Clark	Lucky Thirteen	Midnight Hour (Crooked Lane Books)	Finalist	
2022	Steve Hockensmith	Curious Incidents	Ellery Queen's Mystery Magazine, January/February 2021	Finalist	
2022	R.T. Lawton	The Road to Hana	Alfred Hitchcock's Mystery Magazine, May/June 2021	Finalist	
2022	G.M. Malliet	The White Star	Ellery Queen's Mystery Magazine, July/August 2021	Finalist	
2022	Gigi Pandian	The Locked Room Library	Ellery Queen's Mystery Magazine, July/August 2021	Finalist	
2022	Dave Zeltserman	Julius Katz and the Two Cousins	Ellery Queen's Mystery Magazine, July/August 2021	Finalist	

== Sue Feder Memorial Award for Best Historical Mystery ==
The Sue Feder Historical Mystery Award was established in 2006 to honor Sue Feder, "a reviewer, scholar and dedicated mystery fan, who had founded the [now defunct] Historical Mystery Appreciation Society."

Sue Feder Memorial Award for Best Historical Mystery winners and finalists, 2006-2009
Year	Author	Title	Publisher	Result	Ref.
2006	Jacqueline Winspear	Pardonable Lies	Scribner	Winner	
2006	Rhys Bowen	In Like Flynn	St. Martin's/Minotaur Books	Finalist	
2006	Tony Broadbent	Spectres in the Smoke	St. Martin's	Finalist	
2006	Max Allan Collins	The War of the World Murders		Finalist	
2006	Maureen Jennings	Night's Child	McClelland & Stewart	Finalist	
2007	Rhys Bowen	Oh Danny Boy	G. P. Putnam's Sons	Winner	
2007	Brett Ellen Block	The Lightning Rule	William Morrow & Co.	Finalist	
2007	Barbara Cleverly	The Bee's Kiss	Constable & Robinson	Finalist	
2007	Anne Perry	Dark Assassin	Ballantine Books	Finalist	
2007	Jacqueline Winspear	Messenger of Truth	Henry Holt	Finalist	
2008	Ariana Franklin	Mistress of the Art of Death	UK: Michael Joseph Ltd/Penguin Books; US: HarperCollins	Winner	
2008	Rhys Bowen	Her Royal Spyness	Perseverance Press	Finalist	
2008	Jason Goodwin	The Snake Stone	Simon & Schuster	Finalist	
2008	Clare Langley-Hawthorne	Consequences of Sin	Simon & Schuster	Finalist	
2008	Joyce Carol Oates	The Gravedigger's Daughter	Soho Press	Finalist	
2009	Rhys Bowen	A Royal Pain	McFarland & Co.	Winner	
2009	Ward Larsen	Stealing Trinity	Crossover Press	Finalist	
2009	David Liss	The Whiskey Rebels	Crum Creek Press	Finalist	
2009	Karen Maitland	Company of Liars	Viking Press/Penguin	Finalist	
2009	Kelli Stanley	Nox Dormienda	Minotaur Books	Finalist	
2009	Jeri Westerson	Veil of Lies	William Morrow & Co.	Finalist	
2010	Rebecca Cantrell	A Trace of Smoke	Forge Books	Winner	
2010	Stefanie Pintoff	In the Shadow of Gotham	Minotaur Books	Finalist	
2010	Charles Todd	A Duty to the Dead	William Morrow & Co.	Finalist	
2010	Jeri Westerson	Serpent in the Thorns	Minotaur Books	Finalist	
2010	Jacqueline Winspear	Among the Mad	Henry Holt & Co.	Finalist	
2011	Kelli Stanley	City of Dragons	Minotaur Books	Winner	
2011	Barbara Hamilton	A Marked Man	Berkley Books	Finalist	
2011	David Mitchell	The Thousand Autumns of Jacob de Zoet	Random House	Finalist	
2011	Charles Todd	The Red Door	HarperCollins/William Morrow & Co.	Finalist	
2011	Kenneth Wishnia	The Fifth Servant	HarperCollins/William Morrow & Co.	Finalist	
2012	Catriona McPherson	Dandy Gilver and the Proper Treatment of Bloodstains	Thomas Dunne Books/Minotaur	Winner	
2012	Rhys Bowen	Naughty in Nice	Berkley Books	Finalist	
2012	Jim Fusilli	Narrows Gate	AmazonEncore	Finalist	
2012	Ann Parker	Mercury's Rise	Poisoned Pen Press	Finalist	
2012	Jeri Westerson	Troubled Bones	Minotaur Books	Finalist	
2012	Jacqueline Winspear	A Lesson in Secrets	Harper	Finalist	
2013	Charles Todd	An Unmarked Grave	HarperCollins	Winner	
2013	Rebecca Cantrell	A City of Broken Glass	Forge Books	Finalist	
2013	Susan Elia MacNeal	Princess Elizabeth's Spy	Random House – Bantam Books	Finalist	
2013	Charles Todd	The Confession	HarperCollins	Finalist	
2013	Jacqueline Winspear	Elegy for Eddie	HarperCollins	Finalist	
2014	David Morrell	Murder as a Fine Art	Little, Brown, & Co.	Winner	
2014	Susanna Calkins	A Murder at Rosamund's Gate	Minotaur Books	Finalist	
2014	Robert Kresge	Saving Lincoln	ABQ Press	Finalist	
2014	Catriona McPherson	Dandy Gilver and a Bothersome Number of Corpses	Minotaur Books	Finalist	
2014	Stuart Neville	Ratlines	Soho Crime	Finalist	
2015	Catriona McPherson	A Deadly Measure of Brimstone	Minotaur Books	Winner	
2015	Rhys Bowen	Queen of Hearts	Berkley Prime Crime	Finalist	
2015	Alan Finn	Things Half in Shadow	Gallery	Finalist	
2015	Robert Harris	An Officer and a Spy	Alfred A. Knopf	Finalist	
2015	Malla Nunn	Present Darkness	Atria	Finalist	
2015	Charles Todd	Hunting Shadows	William Morrow & Co.	Finalist	
2016	Susanna Calkins	The Masque of a Murderer	Minotaur Books	Winner	
2016	Shelley Freydont	A Gilded Grave	Berkley Prime Crime	Finalist	
2016	C. Joseph Greaves	Tom & Lucky (and George & Cokey Flo)	Bloomsbury	Finalist	
2016	Philip Kerr	The Lady from Zagreb	Marian Wood/G. P. Putnam's Sons	Finalist	
2016	Jennifer Kincheloe	Secret Life of Anna Blanc	Seventh Street Books	Finalist	
2016	Laurie R. King	Dreaming Spies	Bantam Books	Finalist	
2017	James W. Ziskin	Heart of Stone	Seventh Street Books	Winner	
2017	Susanna Calkins	A Death Along the River Fleet	Minotaur Books	Finalist	
2017	Lyndsay Faye	Jane Steele	UK: Headline Review; US: G. P. Putnam's Sons	Finalist	
2017	Edith Maxwell	Delivering The Truth	Midnight Ink	Finalist	
2017	Catriona McPherson	The Reek of Red Herrings	US: Minotaur; UK: Houghton Stodder	Finalist	
2017	Ann Parker	What Gold Buys	Poisoned Pen Press	Finalist	
2018	Rhys Bowen	In Farleigh Field	Lake Union Publishing	Winner	
2018	James R. Benn	The Devouring	Soho Crime	Finalist	
2018	Abir Mukherjee	A Rising Man	Pegasus	Finalist	
2018	Renee Patrick	Dangerous to Know	Forge Books	Finalist	
2018	Charles Todd	Racing the Devil	William Morrow & Co.	Finalist	
2018	James W. Ziskin	Cast the First Stone	Seventh Street Books	Finalist	
2019	Sujata Massey	The Widows of Malabar Hill	Soho Crime	Winner	
2019	Dianne Freeman	A Lady's Guide to Etiquette and Murder	Kensington Books	Finalist	
2019	Elsa Hart	City of Ink	Minotaur Books	Finalist	
2019	Laurie R. King	Island of the Mad	Bantam Books	Finalist	
2019	Ann Parker	A Dying Note	Poisoned Pen	Finalist	
2019	Charles Todd	A Forgotten Place	William Morrow & Co.	Finalist	
2020	Lara Prescott	The Secrets We Kept	Vintage	Winner	
2020	Susanna Calkins	Murder Knocks Twice	Minotaur Books	Finalist	
2020	L. A. Chandlar	The Pearl Dagger	Kensington Books	Finalist	
2020	Dianne Freeman	A Lady's Guide to Gossip and Murder	Kensington Books	Finalist	
2020	Sujata Massey	The Satapur Moonstone	Soho Crime	Finalist	
2020	Edith Maxwell	Charity's Burden	Midnight Ink	Finalist	
2021	James Ziskin	Turn to Stone	Seventh Street Books	Winner	
2021	Rhys Bowen	The Last Mrs. Summers	Berkley Books	Finalist	
2021	Elsa Hart	The Cabinets of Barnaby Mayne	Minotaur Books	Finalist	
2021	Catriona McPherson	The Turning Tide	Quercus	Finalist	
2021	Ann Parker	Mortal Music	Poisoned Pen Press	Finalist	
2021	Ovidia Yu	The Mimosa Tree Mystery	Constable Press	Finalist	
2022	Naomi Hirahara	Clark and Division	Soho Crime	Winner	
2022	Rhys Bowen	The Venice Sketchbook	Lake Union	Finalist	
2022	Susan Elia MacNeal	The Hollywood Spy	Bantam Books	Finalist	
2022	Sujata Massey	The Bombay Prince	Soho Crime	Finalist	
2022	Silvia Moreno-Garcia	Velvet was the Night	Del Rey Books	Finalist	
2022	Lori Rader-Day	Death at Greenway	William Morrow & Co.	Finalist	
