= Jim Fusilli =

American journalist, essayist and novelist

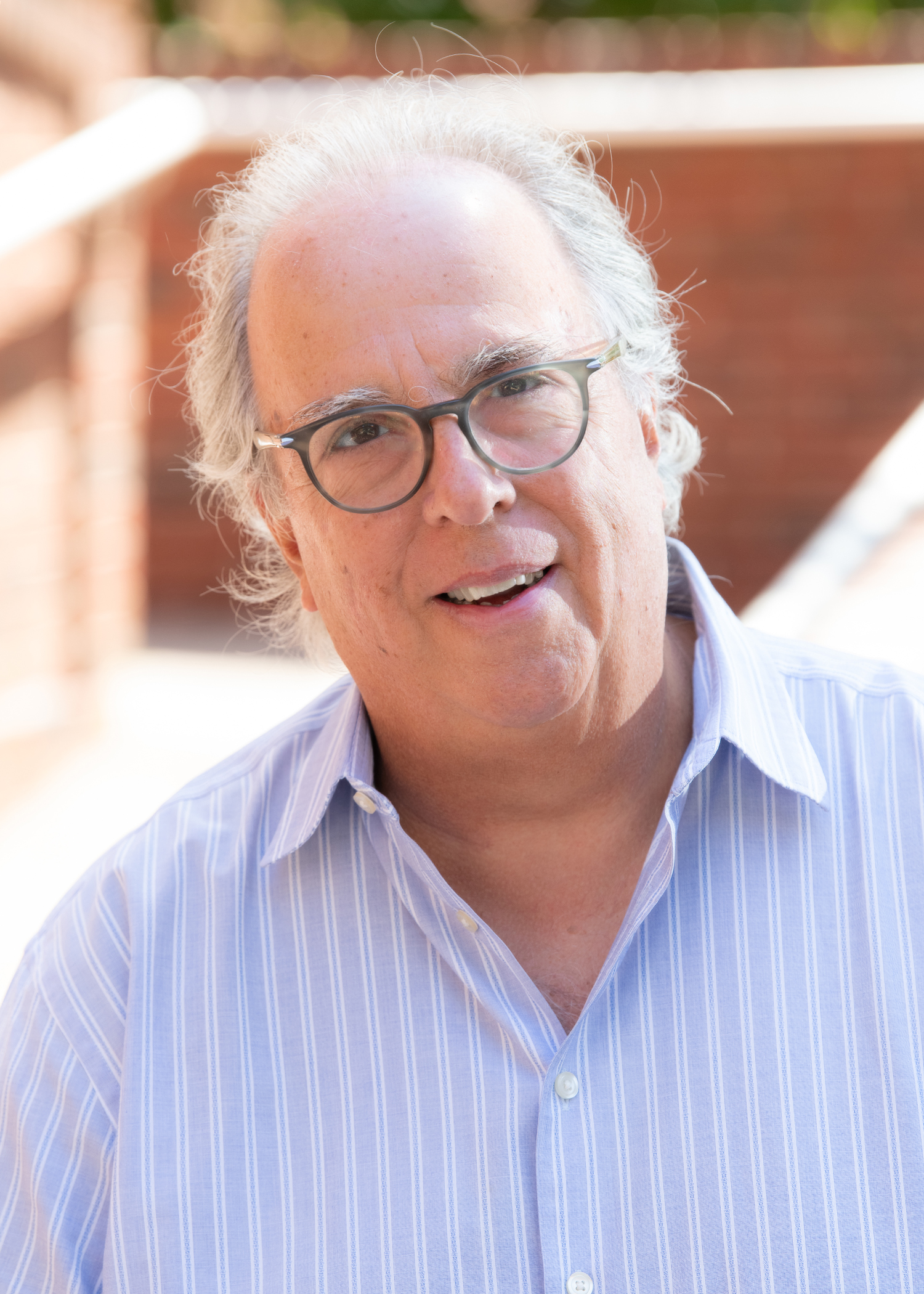
- Fusilli in 2024
- Born: July 17, 1953 (age 73); Hoboken, New Jersey, U.S.
- Education: Saint Peter's University
- Occupation: Novelist
- Children: 1
- Writing career
- Genres: Crime fiction, short stories, historical fiction, Non-fiction
- Website: jimfusilli.com

Jim Fusilli is (born July 17, 1953) is an American novelist, essayist, journalist and songwriter. He has written ten novels and is also the author of the Pet Sounds entry in Bloomsbury Publishing’s 33 1/3 series. He served as the rock-and-pop critic for The Wall Street Journal from 2009 to 2018, and contributed to NPR’s All Things Considered. Songs he wrote were recorded by Suzanna Spring and the Black Canyon City Band for the album The Lost Songs of Katy Shayne, inspired by Fusilli’s novel A Song for Katy Shayne.

Fusilli is host and executive producer of the podcast Writers at Work.

== Early life and education ==
Vincent James Fusilli Jr. was born in Hoboken, New Jersey. He majored in English at St. Peter’s College (now Saint Peter’s University) where he was a critic for the student newspaper, the Pauw Wow. While in college, Fusilli joined the Teamsters Local 560 as a clerk at Smith Transport, headquartered in Hoboken.

== Writing career ==
=== Journalism ===
After graduation in 1975, he served as an intern at The Jersey Journal, where he wrote a weekly column on popular music. He also contributed articles to The Record.

In 1982, Fusilli was hired by Dow Jones & Company, in its Corporate Relations department with responsibility for employee communications. Shortly thereafter, he began to contribute to the Journal’s new Leisure and Arts page, whose editor was Raymond Sokolov.

As he had since the mid-1970s, during this period Fusilli continued to perform his original songs in various Greenwich Village clubs, most notably The Bitter End. His essay "A Wall Street Rocker" was published in The New York Times Magazine in 1986.

While continuing his occasional contributions to the Journal, Fusilli left Dow Jones and joined Sanofi, Inc., the U.S. holding company for the Paris-based Sanofi S.A.. During his 12 years with the company, Fusilli became vice president, Corporate Communications, a position in which he frequently traveled to Paris, accompanied the chairman and CEO Jean-François Dehecq, and worked with Oscar de la Renta, Yves Saint Laurent and other fashion luminaries whose fragrances were marketed by Sanofi. He left the company in 2001.

In 2009, Fusilli was appointed The Wall Street Journal’s rock-and-pop critic, the first in its history, and wrote a weekly column for its Arts section until 2018.

=== Novels ===
The first in a mystery series featuring the private detective Terry Orr and his daughter Bella, Closing Time was published by Penguin Putnam on September 10, 2001. Set in New York's Tribeca district, it was the last novel set in the city prior to the September 11 terrorist attacks. Subsequently, the sequel, A Well-Known Secret, was the first novel set in New York following the attacks; it addresses the impact on the city, the Tribeca neighborhood and the psyche of the reoccurring characters. Two more novels in the series came thereafter: Tribeca Blues, published in 2003, and Hard, Hard City, published in 2004. Hard, Hard City was named the Novel of the Year by Mystery Ink Magazine. The first three books in the series were subsequently reissued by Open Road Integrated Media.

Fusilli's next novel, Narrows Gate (2011), was marked departure from his previous efforts. Set in a fictionalized Hoboken, New Jersey, it explores the Italian-American experience prior to and following World War II. George Pelecanos called it “equal parts Ellroy, Puzo and Scorsese” and Mystery Scene magazine said “must be ranked among the half-dozen most memorable novels about the Mob.” Narrows Gate was nominated for the Macavity Award in the Sue Feder Historical Mystery category in 2012.

Fusilli's novels The Road to Nowhere (2012) and Billboard Man (2013) were published by Amazon Publishing’s Thomas & Mercer imprint.

In January 2024, his novel The Price You Pay, informed in large part by his experiences as a young Teamster, was published by Down & Out Books.

In April, 2024, A Song for Katy Shayne will be published by Level Best Books. Drawing on his experiences as a journalist and a musician who played in Greenwich Village during the period in which the novel is set, Fusilli attributed songs he had written decades earlier to the title character.

Kirk Pasich, founder of Blue Élan Records, acquired the rights to six Fusilli compositions and produced, with Colin Devlin of The Devlins, the album The Lost Songs of Katy Shayne by Suzanna Spring and the Black Canyon City Band. Spring is a member of the country-rock band The Mustangs of the West. The Lost Songs of Katy Shayne was released by Blue Élan Records in 2026.

=== Audiobooks ===
Prior to its acquisition by Amazon, Audible had acquired Narrows Gate, which it published as its first mainstream literary novel. Amazon Publishing issued the paperback original version of Narrows Gate. Its sequel, The Mayor of Polk Street, was published as an Audible Original in 2019 and by Open Road Media in 2022. Actor and film director Edoardo Ballerini narrated Narrows Gate and The Mayor of Polk Street.

=== Young adult ===
Fusilli's novel for young adults, Marley Z and the Bloodstained Violin, was published by Dutton Juvenile in 2008.

=== Short stories ===
Fusilli's short stories have appeared in magazines including Alfred Hitchcock’s Mystery Magazine, and anthologies edited by Lee Child, Dennis Lehane, Laura Lippman, George Pelecanos and others. He edited and contributed to the anthologies The Chopin Manuscript, The Copper Bracelet and Crime Plus Music: Twenty Stories of Music-Themed Noir. His anthology Brutal & Strange: Stories Based on the Songs of Elvis Costello, featuring Mark Billingham, Peter Blauner, Meg Gardiner, Catriona McPherson, Alex Segura, George Pelecanos, Gary Phillips and others, was published by Down & Out Books in 2023. A new, expanded edition of Brutal & Strange was published in 2026 by Writers at Work Books, Fusilli’s publishing company.

Fusilli’s short story "Chellini’s Solution" was included in an edition of the Best American Mystery Stories and his "Digby, Attorney at Law" was nominated for the Edgar and Macavity awards in 2010, presented by the Mystery Writers of America and Mystery Readers International, respectively.

=== Nonfiction ===
In 2005, Fusilli's writing on Pet Sounds was published as part of the 33 1/3 series. It was translated for a Japanese language edition by Haruki Murakami.

=== Podcast ===
In 2024, Fusilli launched Writers at Work, a podcast featuring interviews with authors, screenwriters, songwriters and journalists for readers and writers about the joys, heartaches, challenges and satisfaction of the creative writing process. Guests have included Allegra Goodman, Larissa FastHorse, Carl Hiaasen, Dennis Lehane, Brad Meltzer, Walter Mosley, Graham Nash, Sara Paretsky, Ben Shattuck, Jane Smiley, Will Smith, Adriana Trigiani, Douglas Preston and Lincoln Child, and Don Winslow.

== Personal life ==
Fusilli is married to Diane Holuk Fusilli, an international communications executive.
