= Art Taylor (writer) =

American short story writer and critic

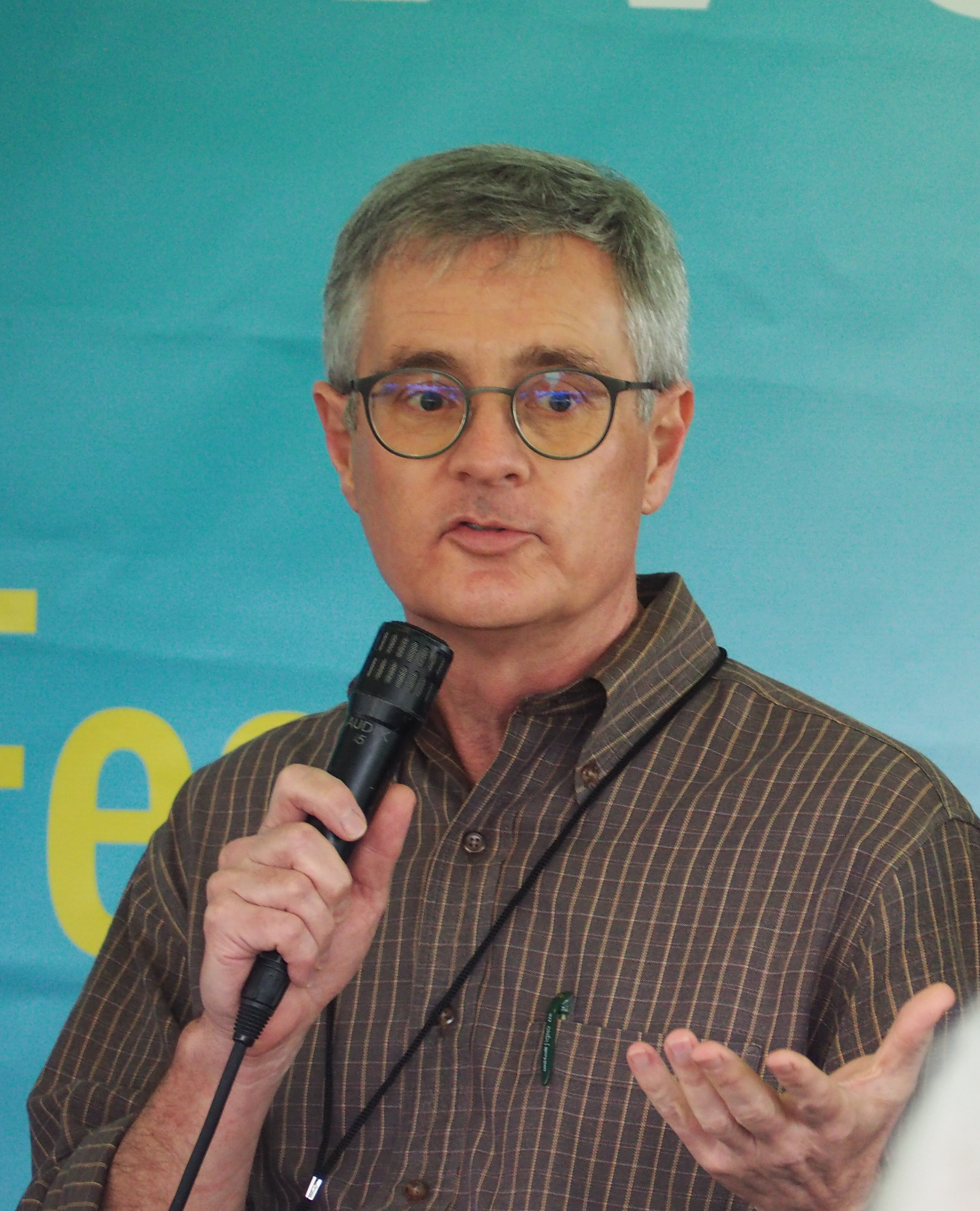
- Taylor at the 2024 Gaithersburg Book Festival
- Born: Richlands, North Carolina, U.S.
- Education: Yale University; North Carolina State University; George Mason University
- Occupations: Short story writer, novelist
- Writing career
- Language: English
- Genres: Crime Fiction, Mystery
- Notable awards: Edgar Award
- Website: www.arttaylorwriter.com

Art Taylor is an American short story writer, book critic and an English professor.

== Early life and education ==
Taylor was born and raised in Richlands, North Carolina. He graduated from Episcopal High School, a private school in Alexandria, Virginia. He went on to Yale University, where in 1990 he graduated with a Bachelor of Arts, and he received a Master of Arts in 2003 from North Carolina State University and a Master of Fine Arts in 2006 from George Mason University.

== Career ==
Taylor's short fiction won an Edgar Award in 2019; an Anthony Award in 2015; Agatha Awards in 2014, 2015, and 2017; Macavity Awards in 2014, 2017, 2019, and 2020; and four Derringer Awards: for Best Novelette in 2011 and 2021 and for Best Long Story in 2012 and 2013. He is the author of On the Road With Del & Louise: A Novel in Stories (2015), which won the Agatha Award for Best First Novel in 2016. He edited Murder Under the Oaks: Bouchercon Anthology 2015, which won the Anthony Award for Best Anthology or Collection in 2016. In addition to writing fiction, he also reviews mysteries and thrillers for The Washington Post and contributes to Mystery Scene magazine.

He is a professor of English at George Mason University.

== Bibliography ==
=== Books ===
- On the Road With Del & Louise: A Novel in Stories. Henery Press. 2015. ISBN 978-1-941962-89-3.
- The Boy Detective & The Summer of '74 and Other Tales of Suspense. Crippen & Landru. 2020. ISBN 978-1-936363-44-5.
- The Adventure of the Castle Thief and Other Expeditions and Indiscretions. Crippen & Landru. 2023. ISBN 978-1-936363-73-5.

=== Articles ===
- "It's no mystery : what genre fiction can teach all writers". Clues : A Journal of Detection. 41 (2): 91–93. Fall 2023.

== Personal life ==
Taylor is married to editor and novelist Tara Laskowski, and they have one son, Dash.
