= Jill Churchill =

American novelist (1943–2023)

- Born: Janice Young Brooks; January 11, 1943
- Died: July 12, 2023 (aged 80); Kansas City, Missouri, U.S.
- Education: University of Kansas; University of Missouri–Kansas City
- Occupation: Author
- Writing career
- Notable awards: Agatha Award (1989); Macavity Award (1990)

Jill Churchill (born Janice Young Brooks; January 11, 1943 – July 12, 2023) was an American author, winner of the Agatha and Macavity Awards for her first Jane Jeffry novel and featured in Great Women Mystery Writers (2007).

== Biography ==
Churchill earned a degree in education from the University of Kansas in 1965 and then studied at the University of Missouri–Kansas City before teaching in elementary school for some years. Between 1978 and 1992, she was book reviewer for the Kansas City Star. She died in Kansas City in 2023.

== Writer ==
She had published several historical novels under her real name before introducing a new series in 1989. This mystery series follows Jane Jeffry, a widow with three children living in suburban Chicago. With her neighbor and best friend Shelley Nowack, she gets caught up in murder cases. These often involve Mel Van Dyne, a police detective introduced in the first novel. The novel titles are puns on literary works and reflect Jeffry's cozy domestic life which she leads between crime-solving capers.

In 1999, Churchill began a new mystery series set during the Great Depression, which features siblings Robert and Lily Brewster who live in New York. They have inherited a house from their great-uncle, which they run as a guest house to earn money.

== Published books ==
=== Non-fiction ===
- Kings and Queens: The Plantagenets of England, as Janice Young Brooks (T. Nelson, 1975)– children's non-fiction, OCLC 1502441

=== Jane Jeffry series ===
- Grime and Punishment (1989)
- A Farewell to Yarns (1991)
- A Quiche Before Dying (1993)
- The Class Menagerie (1994)
- A Knife to Remember (1994)
- From Here to Paternity (1995)
- Silence of the Hams (1996)
- War and Peas (1996)
- Fear of Frying (1997)
- The Merchant of Menace (1998)
- A Groom With a View (1999)
- Mulch Ado About Nothing (2000)
- The House of Seven Mabels (2002)
- Bell, Book, and Scandal (2003)
- A Midsummer Night's Scream (2004)
- The Accidental Florist (2007)

=== Grace and Favor series ===
- Anything Goes (1999)
- In the Still of the Night (2000)
- Someone to Watch Over Me (2001)
- Love for Sale (2003)
- It Had to Be You (2004)
- Who's Sorry Now? (2005)
- Smoke Gets in Your Eyes (never published)

=== Other fiction ===
==== As Janice Young Brooks ====
- In Love's Own Time (1977)
- Forbidden Fires (1977)
- Seventrees (1981)
- Still the Mighty Waters (1983)
- Our Lives, Our Fortunes (1984)
- Glory (1985)
- The Circling Years (1986)
- Season of Desire (1986)
- Crown Sable (1986)
- Cinnamon Wharf (1988)
- Guests of the Emperor (1990)
- The Herron Heritage (1992)

==== As Amanda Singer ====
- Ozark Legacy (1975)

==== As Valerie Vayle ====
- Lady of Fire (1980)
- Seaflame (1980)
- Oriana (1981)
