= Edith Maxwell (author) =

American writer

- Born: November 2, 1952 (age 73); Pasadena, California, U.S.
- Education: University of California, Irvine (BA); Indiana University (PhD)
- Occupation: Novelist
- Years active: 2012–present

Edith Maxwell (born November 2, 1952) is an Agatha Award-winning American mystery author also currently writing as Maddie Day. She writes cozy, traditional, and historical mysteries set in the United States.

== Biography ==
Maxwell was born in Pasadena and grew up in the Los Angeles suburb of Temple City with two older sisters and a younger brother. Her father taught high school and her mother was a Girl Scout leader and a real estate appraiser. Maxwell was an exchange student with AFS Intercultural Programs in Brazil for a year in 1970. She holds a BA (linguistics, 1974) from University of California, Irvine, and a PhD (linguistics, 1981) from Indiana University.

Prior to writing fiction full time, she worked as an auto mechanic, taught conversational English in Japan and independent childbirth classes in Massachusetts, owned and operated a small certified-organic farm, wrote free-lance articles, and most recently produced software documentation for several hi-tech companies in the Boston area. Besides Brazil and Japan she has also lived in Mali and Burkina Faso.

== Authorial career ==
Maxwell’s first published fiction was in the Pasadena Star-News, where she won a children’s fiction contest in 1961. Her first published short story as an adult was in 1996, and her first novel appeared in 2012. She is a lifetime member of Sisters in Crime and served as President of the New England chapter for two years. She is also a member of Mystery Writers of America, the Short Mystery Fiction Society, and the Historical Novel Society. She has been a full-time mystery author since 2013. Maxwell has two dozen mystery novels and a novella in print.

Maxwell decided to write cozy mysteries because "I don’t want to read noir or nail-biter thrillers. Our world is scary and messy enough. When I’m finished reading a book, I don’t want to feel worse about society. That’s what I write, too."

== Bibliography ==
=== Local Foods Mysteries (as Edith Maxwell) ===
- A Tine to Live, a Tine to Die June 2013 Kensington
- ‘Til Dirt Do Us Part June 2014 Kensington
- Farmed and Dangerous May 2015 Kensington
- Murder Most Fowl May 2016 Kensington
- Mulch Ado About Murder May 2017 Kensington

=== Country Store Mysteries (as Maddie Day) ===
- Flipped for Murder October 2015 Kensington
- Grilled for Murder May 2016 Kensington
- When the Grits Hit the Fan March 2017 Kensington
- Biscuits and Slashed Browns January 2018 Kensington
- Death Over Easy July 2018 Kensington
- Strangled Eggs and Ham July 2019 Kensington
- Christmas Cocoa Murder Sept 2019 Kensington
- Nacho Average Murder July 2020 Kensington
- Candy Slain Murder Sept 2020 Kensington

=== Cozy Capers Book Group Mysteries (as Maddie Day) ===
- Murder on Cape Cod December 2018 Kensington
- Murder at the Taffy Shop March 2020 Kensington
- Murder at the Lobstah Shack November 2021 Kensington
- Murder in a Cape Cottage September 2022 Kensington
- Murder at the Cape Bookstore August 2023 Kensington
- Murder at the Rusty Anchor June 2024 Kensington
- Murder at Cape Costumes August 2025 Kensington

=== Quaker Midwife Mysteries (as Edith Maxwell) ===
- Delivering the Truth April 2016 Midnight Ink
- Called to Justice April 2017 Midnight Ink
- Turning the Tide April 2018 Midnight Ink
- Charity’s Burden April 2019 Midnight Ink
- Judge Thee Not September 2019 Beyond the Page
- Taken Too Soon September 2020 Beyond the Page

=== Lauren Rousseau Mysteries (as Tace Baker) ===
- Speaking of Murder September 2012 Barking Rain, reissued in 2020 by Beyond the Page
- Bluffing is Murder November 2014 Barking Rain, reissued in 2020 by Beyond the Page

== Awards and recognition ==
- 2014 Agatha Award nomination for Best Short Story, “Just Desserts for Johnny”
- 2015 Agatha Award nomination for Best Short Story, “A Questionable Death”
- 2016 Agatha Award nomination for Best Historical Novel, Delivering the Truth
- 2017 Agatha Award nomination for Best Historical Novel for Called to Justice
- 2018 Agatha Award nomination for Best Historical Novel, Turning the Tide
- 2019 Agatha Award winner for Best Historical Novel, Charity's Burden
- 2016 Macavity Award (Sue Feder Historical Mystery Award) nomination, Delivering the Truth
- 2019 Macavity Award (Sue Feder Historical Mystery Award) nomination, Charity's Burden
- 2016 Agatha Award nomination for Best Short Story, “The Mayor and the Midwife”
- 2013 Honorable Mention in the Al Blanchard Short Crime Fiction contest, “Breaking the Silence”
