= Janet Dawson (writer) =

American writer of mysteries

- Born: October 31, 1949 (age 76); Purcell, Oklahoma, United States
- Education: University of Colorado, Boulder, B.S. in journalism, 1971; California State University, Hayward, M.A. in history, 1983
- Occupation: Mystery writer
- Parent(s): Donald E. and Thelma Louise Dawson
- Writing career
- Notable awards: Best first private eye novel contest, St. Martin's Press/Private Eye Writer's Association, 1990; Macavity Award, 2004
- Website: www.janetdawson.com

Janet Dawson (born October 31, 1949) is an American writer of mysteries. Thirteen of her novels comprise the Jeri Howard series, featuring a private eye of the same name, and three make up the California Zephyr series featuring private eye Jill McLeod. Dawson's work has included many short stories and a mystery novel, What You Wish For, that is not part of either series. Dawson's Kindred Crimes was named a "best first private-eye novel" by St. Martin's Press and the Private Eye Writer's Association in 1990, and in 2004, her short story, "Voice Mail", won a Macavity Award.

Dawson, a graduate of the University of Colorado, Boulder (B.S. in journalism), began her writing career as a reporter for the Daily News of Lamar, Colorado (1972–74). She served in the United States Navy (1975–83), where she rose to the rank of lieutenant. During these same years, she completed work for an M.A. in history at California State University, Hayward, graduating in 1983. From then through 1995, she was a legal secretary for Safeway Inc., thereafter becoming a full-time writer.

== Critical reception ==
Pearl G. Aldrich, in St. James Guide to Crime and Mystery Writers, praises Dawson for creating a strong central character, Jeri Howard, "an independent woman who chooses her own destiny and fights her own battles", for her main series of novels. The overall quality of that series, she says, is high. Though she finds Dawson's writing style "pedestrian ... and plodding", the private eye is "appealing and her cases interesting."

Of Dawson's first Jeri Howard novel, Kindred Crimes, Publishers Weekly says, "Dawson keeps suspense and interest at high pitch even for readers who correctly distinguish the guilty and innocent." The magazine describes as "workmanlike" her most recent novel in the series, The Devil Close Behind, concluding that "This love letter to New Orleans has a great sense of place, which compensates in part for a mystery with few surprises. Series fans will best appreciate this one."

Lauren Miller, writing for the Historical Novel Society, praises Dawson for the "extensive research into train life" that informs Death Rides the Zephyr. This detail includes "every aspect of being a Zephyrette [train stewardess], from dealing with rude customers to the ticket colors used when scheduling luncheon and the dinner hour." However, Miller says, "The well-detailed nature of the piece does affect the pacing, which at times feels slow...".

== Bibliography ==
Jeri Howard series

- Kindred Crimes (1990) ISBN 978-0449220146
- Till the Old Men Die (1993) ISBN 978-0449221334
- Take a Number (1993) ISBN 978-0449907658
- Don't Turn Your Back on the Ocean (1994) ISBN 978-0747248712
- Nobody's Child (1995) ISBN 978-0449223567
- A Credible Threat (1996) ISBN 978-0449223574
- Witness to Evil (1997) ISBN 978-0449224717
- Where the Bodies Are Buried (1998) ISBN 978-0449003220
- A Killing at the Track (2000) ISBN 978-0449005316
- Bit Player (2011) ISBN 978-1564744944
- Cold Trail (2015) ISBN 978-1564745552
- Water Signs (2017) ISBN 978-1564745866
- The Devil Close Behind (2019) ISBN 978-1564746061

California Zephyr series

- Death Rides the Zephyr (2013)
- Death Deals a Hand (2016) ISBN 978-1564745699
- The Ghost in Roomette Four (2018) ISBN 978-1564745989

Short stories

- What the Cat Dragged In (2002)
- Scam and Eggs (2011) ISBN 978-0786248384

Other

- What You Wish For: A Novel of Suspense (2012) ISBN 978-1564745187
