= Joan Hess =

American novelist

- Born: January 6, 1949
- Died: November 23, 2017 (aged 68); Austin, Texas, U.S.
- Occupation: Writer
- Writing career
- Pen name: Joan Hadley
- Genre: Mystery fiction
- Notable awards: Agatha Award (1990); Macavity Award (1991)

Joan Hess (January 6, 1949 – November 23, 2017) was an American mystery writer, a member of Sisters in Crime, and a former president of the American Crime Writers League. She wrote two popular mystery series: The Claire Malloy Mysteries and The Maggody Mysteries (also called The Arly Hanks Mysteries), and contributed to multiple anthologies and book series, including: Crosswinds, Deadly Allies, Malice Domestic, Sisters in Crime, and The Year's 25 Finest Crime and Mystery Stories. She also wrote the Theo Bloomer mystery series, under the pseudonym Joan Hadley.

== Series ==
The Claire Malloy series is set in Farberville, Arkansas, and centers around Claire Malloy, who owns a small bookstore across from the campus of Farberville College. It has been suggested that Farberville is a stand-in for Fayetteville, Arkansas, with many landmarks, including the University of Arkansas-Fayetteville, Dickson Street, and even well-known local citizens, thinly veiled in the prose.

The Arly Hanks series is set in Maggody, Arkansas, population 755. The main character is Arly Hanks, Maggody's irreverent young female police chief. The first book of the Arly Hanks series, Malice in Maggody, was the basis for the 1993 CBS television pilot Arly Hanks.

In the Theo Bloomer series the eponymous protagonist, "a dignified offshoot of old Connecticut money and prestige", is a retired bachelor-botanist who formerly worked as a florist. In each book, family obligations take him to an exotic vacation destination, where he becomes embroiled in a mystery: in the first book, he travels to Israel to retrieve his niece, who is staying at a kibbutz hotel, and in the next he accompanies her party to a "luxurious villa" in Montego Bay, Jamaica, as a chaperone.

== Awards ==
Awards for Hess's writing
Year	Title	Award	Result	Ref.
1987	Strangled Prose	Anthony Award for Best First Novel	Finalist	
1988	Mischief in Maggody	Agatha Award for Best Novel	Finalist	
1990	"Too Much to Bare" in Sisters in Crime 2	Agatha Award for Best Short Story	Winner	
1991	"Too Much to Bare" in Sisters in Crime 2	Macavity Award for Best Mystery Short Story	Winner	
1992	"The Last To Know" in Malice Domestic 1	Agatha Award for Best Short Story	Finalist	
1993	O Little Town of Maggody	Agatha Award for Best Novel	Finalist	
1994	O Little Town of Maggody	Anthony Award for Best Novel	Finalist	
1995	Miracles in Maggody	Agatha Award for Best Novel	Finalist	
1995	Miracles in Maggody	Lefty Award for Best Humorous Mystery Novel Award	Finalist	

== Personal life ==
A longtime resident of Fayetteville, Arkansas, Hess lived in Austin, Texas, where she died at her home November 23, 2017.

== Bibliography ==
=== Novels ===
Claire Malloy series by Joan Hess (Note: Numbers are those assigned by MacMillan publishers in their latest release of these books and do not necessarily reflect the order of first publication.)

1. Strangled Prose
2. The Murder at the Mimosa Inn
3. Dear Miss Demeanor
4. A Really Cute Corpse
5. A Diet to Die For
6. Roll Over and Play Dead
7. Death by the Light of the Moon
8. Poisoned Pins
9. Tickled to Death
10. Closely Akin to Murder
11. Busy Bodies
12. A Holly, Jolly Murder
13. A Conventional Corpse
14. Out on a Limb
15. The Goodbye Body
16. Damsels in Distress
17. Mummy Dearest
18. Deader Homes and Gardens
19. Murder as a Second Language
20. Pride v. Prejudice

Maggody series by Joan Hess (Note: The Maggody books are listed in reading order.)

1. Malice in Maggody
2. Mischief in Maggody
3. Much Ado in Maggody
4. Madness in Maggody
5. Mortal Remains in Maggody
6. Maggody in Manhattan
7. O Little Town of Maggody
8. Martians in Maggody
9. Miracles in Maggody
10. The Maggody Militia
11. Misery Loves Maggody
12. Murder@maggody.com
13. Maggody and the Moonbeams
14. Muletrain to Maggody
15. Malpractice in Maggody
16. The Merry Wives of Maggody

Theo Bloomer Mystery series by Joan Hadley (Note: The Theo Bloomer books are listed in reading order.)

1. The Night-Blooming Cereus (1986)
2. The Deadly Ackee (1988)

Standalone Teenage Romance

1. Future Tense (1987)

=== Short stories ===
- Hess, Joan & Wallace, Marilyn, ed. (1990). "Too Much to Bare". Sisters in Crime 2. New York: Berkley. ISBN 9780425119662.
- Hess, Joan & Greenberg, Martin, ed. (1992). "The Last to Know". Malice Domestic #1. Pocket Books. ISBN 9780671738266.

Maggody Files: Hillbilly Cat Great Cat Mysteries: An Anthology of Feline Capers (audio edition by Phoenix Books, 1996). She also has two books of solely her own short stories.

=== Co-authored Novel ===
She co-authored Elizabeth Peters's last book, The Painted Queen. After Elizabeth Peters died, Joan Hess completed this last novel in the popular Amelia Peabody series.
