= Jane K. Cleland =

American author

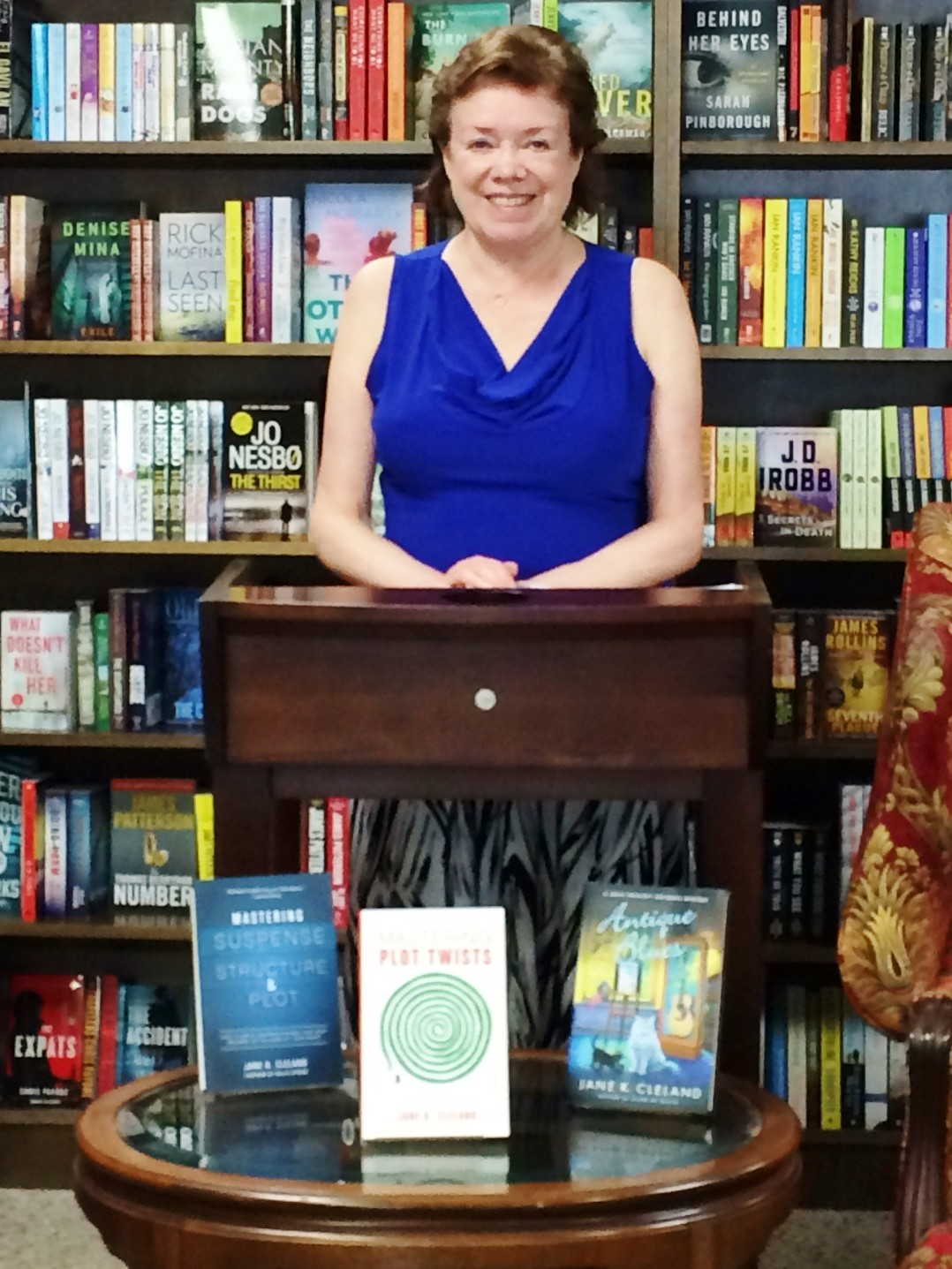
- Born: Boston, Massachusetts, U.S.
- Education: University of Denver (BA); Babson College (MBA); Western Connecticut State University (MFA)
- Writing career
- Genres: Fiction; mystery
- Website: www.janecleland.com

Jane K. Cleland is a contemporary American author of mystery fiction and non-fiction. She is the author of the Josie Prescott Antiques Mysteries, a traditional mystery series set in New Hampshire and featuring antiques appraiser Josie Prescott, as well as books and articles about the craft of writing. Cleland has been nominated for and has won numerous awards for her writing, and her mystery series was recently optioned for film and TV development.

== Early years ==
Jane K. Cleland was born in Boston and reared in Newton, Massachusetts, graduating from Newton High School. She then attended the University of Denver, graduating with a B.A. in English and Theatre. She obtained an M.B.A in Marketing and Management from Babson College, and an M.F.A. in Playwriting and Speechwriting from Western Connecticut State University.

== Works ==
=== Josie Prescott novels ===
- Consigned to Death (2006). This, the first Josie Prescott book, was an Independent Mystery Booksellers Association bestseller and was nominated for the Agatha, Macavity, and David Awards for Best First Novel. A Reader’s Digest Book Club selection. Selected by the New Hampshire State Library as a Book of the Week. Translated into Russian and Hungarian. Editions published in the UK and in large print. Selected by Library Journal as a "core title" for librarians seeking to build a cozy collection.
- Deadly Appraisal (2007), won the David Award for Best Novel of 2008. Editions published in the UK and in large print.
- Antiques to Die For (2008), nominated for the David Award for Best Novel of 2009. Editions published in the UK and in large print.
- Killer Keepsakes (2009). Editions published in the UK and in large print.
- Silent Auction (2010), a Harlequin Book Club selection and nominated for the David Award for Best Novel of 2010. Editions published in the UK and in large print.
- Deadly Threads (2011), a Harlequin Book Club selection. Editions published in the UK and in large print.
- Dolled Up for Murder (2012), a Harlequin Book Club selection and winner of the David Award for Best Novel of 2013. Editions published in the UK and in large print.
- Lethal Treasure (2013), a Harlequin Book Club selection and nominated for the David Award for Best Novel of 2014. Editions published in the UK and in large print.
- Blood Rubies (2014), a Harlequin Book Club selection and nominated for the David Award for Best Novel of 2015. Editions published in the UK and in large print.
- Ornaments of Death (2015), a LibraryReads pick (January, 2016). Editions published in the UK and in large print. Shelf Awareness Starred Review (December 22, 2015). Nominated for the David Award for Best Novel of 2016.
- Glow of Death (2016). Editions published in the UK and in large print.
- Antique Blues (2018). Starred review from Library Journal. Editions published in the UK and in large print.
- Hidden Treasure (2020).
- Jane Austen's Lost Letters (2021).

=== Short stories ===
- "Killing Time" - Alfred Hitchcock's Mystery Magazine, November, 2008. A Josie Prescott Antiques mystery story. Nominated for Agatha Awards and Anthony Awards for Best Short Story, 2008; also named one of the Best Short Stories of 2008 by critic and scholar, Michael E. Grost.
- "Designed To Kill" - Alfred Hitchcock Mystery Magazine, June 2009. A Josie Prescott Antiques mystery story.
- "Last Supper", Alfred Hitchcock's Mystery Magazine, June 2012. Features Laney, a 12-year-old orphan.
- "Booked for Murder", Alfred Hitchcock's Mystery Magazine, January 2015. A Josie Prescott Antiques Mystery story.
- "Night Flight to Bali", Alfred Hitchcock's Mystery Magazine, September 2017. Features a woman who will do anything for love.
- "The Setup", Alfred Hitchcock's Mystery Magazine, September/October 2025.

=== Non-fiction books ===
- Business Writing for Results, McGraw Hill
- Putting First What Matters Most NAL/Penguin Putnam
- Mastering Suspense, Structure & Plot, Writer’s Digest Books, 2016. Winner of Agatha Award and 2017 Macavity Award Finalist for Best Nonfiction
- Mastering Plot Twists, Writer’s Digest Books, 2018. Winner of Agatha Award and nominated for 2019 Anthony Awards for Best Nonfiction or Critical Work.
- Beat the Bots: A Writer's Guide to Surviving and Thriving in the Age of AI, Regalo Press, 2025.

== Affiliations ==
Cleland is the Vice President for the Florida Chapter of Mystery Writers of America. Previously, she was the President of the group's New York chapter and served on the National Board.

She chairs the Literary Awards Committee of The Wolfe Pack, an association of fans of the Nero Wolfe novels by Rex Stout which confers the annual Nero Award, as well as the Black Orchid Novella Award (BONA) in partnership with Alfred Hitchcock Mystery Magazine. Cleland is also a member of the Association of Writers and Writing Programs and Sisters in Crime.

Cleland is on the faculty of Lehman College, part of the City University of New York (CUNY), a Contributing Editor for Writer's Digest, and a member of International Thriller Writers (ITW).

== Honors and awards ==
- Agatha Award, Best Nonfiction 2018, Malice Domestic: Mastering Plot Twists
- Agatha Award, Best Nonfiction 2016, Malice Domestic: Mastering Suspense, Structure, and Plot: How to Write Gripping Stories that Keep Readers on the Edge of Their Seats
- Bestseller, Independent Mystery Bookseller Association: Consigned to Death
- Anthony Award, Nominated Best Critical or Non-Fiction Work 2019, Mastering Suspense, Structure, and Plot: How to Write Gripping Stories that Keep Readers on the Edge of Their Seats
- Anthony Award, Best Short Story, Bouchercon 2009: "Killing Time"
- David Award, Best Novel 2016 Finalist, Ornaments of Death
- David Award, Best Novel 2015 Finalist, Blood Rubies
- David Award, Best Novel 2014 Finalist, Lethal Treasure
- David Award, Best Novel 2013, Dolled Up for Murder
- David Award, Best Novel 2010 Finalist, Silent Auction
- David Award, Best Novel 2009 Finalist, Antiques to Die For
- David Award, Best Novel 2008, Deadly Appraisal
- David Award, Best First Novel 2006 Finalist, Consigned to Death
- Macavity Award, Best Nonfiction 2017 Finalist: Mastering Suspense, Structure, and Plot: How to Write Gripping Stories that Keep Readers on the Edge of Their Seats
- Macavity Award, Best First Novel 2007 Finalist: Consigned to Death
- “Core Title” Consigned to Death selected by Library Journal as a “core title” when building a cozy collection, one of only 22 titles listed, along with novels by Agatha Christie & Dorothy L. Sayers
