= Jan Burke =

American author

- Born: August 1, 1953 (age 73); Houston, Texas, U.S.
- Education: California State University, Long Beach
- Occupation: Author
- Writing career
- Notable awards: Macavity Award for Best Short Story (1995, 2002); Edgar Allan Poe Award for Best Novel (2000); Agatha Award for Best Short Story (2000)

Jan Burke (born August 1, 1953) is an American author of novels and short stories. She is a winner of the Edgar Award for Best Novel, the Agatha Award for Best Short Story, the Macavity Award, and Ellery Queen Readers Choice Award.

== Biography ==
Burke was born August 1, 1953, in Houston, Texas, but has lived in Southern California most of her life. She attended California State University, Long Beach, and graduated with a degree in history. She is a distinguished alumna of CSULB.

She worked as a researcher on an oral history project interviewing "Rosie the Riveters." Later she became the manager of a manufacturing plant for a large corporation.

She completed her first novel, Goodnight, Irene, in the evenings after work. It was sold unagented and unsolicited to Simon & Schuster. She received a surprising boost from a new fan when, during his first White House interview after taking office, President Bill Clinton said he was reading Goodnight, Irene.

Her books have been on bestseller lists of The New York Times, USA Today and other publications. They have been published internationally and have been optioned for film and television.

Burke became active in raising awareness of the problems facing crime labs and the need to obtain better funding for forensic science, at one point founding a nonprofit to do so. She has also been an advocate for the improvement of medicolegal death investigation in the U.S. and for requiring the reporting of unidentified remains to NamUs. Working with missing persons advocates, she helped to get legislation passed in New York State, the first state to require Namus reporting by all coroners and medical examiners. Other states have followed this model. She has been a speaker at meetings of the National Institute of Justice, the American Society of Crime Lab Directors, the California Association of Criminalists, the California Association of Crime Lab Directors, and other forensic science organizations. She has served on the honorary board of the California Forensic Science Institute.

Burke has been the Guest of Honor at several mystery fan conventions, including Malice Domestic, Left Coast Crime, and Mayhem in the Midwest.

Illness in her family has taken her away from writing in recent years.

== Contributions ==
Burke edited the first edition of Breaking and Entering, a Sisters in Crime's guide to getting published. She served as an Associate Editor on Writing Mysteries: A Handbook by the Mystery Writers of America, edited by Sue Grafton. She has served on the national boards of Mystery Writers of America (MWA) and the American Crime Writers League. She is a past president of the Southern California Chapter of Mystery Writers of America.

Burke's novel Bloodlines appears in the television series Bones: Season 1, Ep. 17 - "The Skull in the Desert. It is used as a prop on a table at minute 15:05.

== Awards and honors ==
Burke has received the Ellery Queen's Mystery Magazine Readers Choice Award and Romantic Times's Career Achievement Award for Contemporary Suspense.

Awards for Burke's writing
Year	Title	Award	Result	Ref.
1993	Goodnight, Irene	Agatha Award for Best First Novel	Shortlisted	
1994	Goodnight, Irene	Anthony Award for Best First Novel	Shortlisted	
1995	"Unharmed"	Macavity Award for Best Short Story	Won	
1997	Hocus	Agatha Award for Best Novel	Shortlisted	
1998	Hocus	Barry Award for Best Novel	Shortlisted	
1998	Hocus	Macavity Award for Best Novel	Shortlisted	
1998	Liar	Agatha Award for Best Novel	Shortlisted	
1998	Liar	Macavity Award for Best Novel	Shortlisted	
1999	"Two Bits"	Anthony Award for Best Short Story	Shortlisted	
2000	Bones	Anthony Award for Best Novel	Shortlisted	
2000	Bones	Edgar Award for Best Novel	Won	
2000	"The Man in the Civil Suit"	Agatha Award for Best Short Story	Won	
2001	"The Man in the Civil Suit"	Macavity Award for Best Short Story	Shortlisted	
2002	"The Abbey Ghosts"	Edgar Allan Poe Award for Best Short Story	Shortlisted	
2002	"The Abbey Ghosts"	Macavity Award for Best Short Story	Won	
2002	"Devotion"	Agatha Award for Best Short Story	Shortlisted	
2002	Flight	Anthony Award for Best Novel	Shortlisted	
2002	Flight	Nero Award	Shortlisted	
2002	Writing Mysteries	Agatha Award for Best Non-Fiction	Shortlisted	
2003	Nine	Macavity Award for Best Mystery Novel	Shortlisted	
2006	Bloodlines	Anthony Award for Best Novel	Shortlisted	
2006	Bloodlines	Barry Award for Best Novel	Shortlisted	
2007	Kidnapped	Anthony Award for Best Novel	Shortlisted	
2007	Kidnapped	Nero Award	Shortlisted	
2009	"The Fallen"	Barry Award for Best Short Story	Shortlisted	
2012	Disturbance	Left Coast Crime Golden Nugget Award	Shortlisted	

== Publications ==
=== Irene Kelly Mysteries ===
- Goodnight, Irene (1993)
- Sweet Dreams, Irene (1994)
- Dear Irene (1995)
- Remember Me, Irene (1996)
- Hocus (1997)
- Liar (1998)
- Bones (2000)
- Flight (2001) (from the POV of Frank Harriman)
- Bloodlines (2005)
- Kidnapped (2006)
- Disturbance (2011)

=== Other novels ===
- Nine (2002)
- The Messenger (2009)

=== collection of short stories ===
- 18 (2003)
