= Arly Hanks =

Arly Hanks is a 1993 American television pilot based on the first book of Joan Hess's series Malice in Maggody. Written by Sean Clark and directed by Arlene Sanford, it screened on CBS on August 20, 1994. Due to low ratings, the show was removed from the CBS season. Filmed in Atlanta, Georgia, the plot centered on Arly Hanks (Kate Jackson) who, after divorcing her husband, leaves her life in New York City and returns to her small hometown of Maggody, Arkansas. She becomes Sheriff of Maggody and deals with mischievous residents while solving mysteries.

== Cast ==
- Kate Jackson as Arly Hanks
- Ron Perlman as Jim-Bob Buchanan
- Polly Bergen as Ruby Bee
- Olivia Cole as Estelle
- Ray McKinnon as Hobert Middleton
- Nancy Youngblut as Miz Middleton
- Raynor Scheine as Raz Buchanan
- Harrison Page as Larry-Joe
- Chambers Stevens as Kevin
- Patrika Darbo as Dahlia O'Neill
- Julie McCullough as Jay Lee
