= Susan Elia MacNeal =

American author (born 1968)

- Born: Buffalo, New York, U.S.
- Occupation: Author
- Years active: 1991–present
- Spouse: Noel MacNeal (m. 1999)
- Children: 1

Susan Elia MacNeal (born 1968) is an American author best known for her Maggie Hope Series of novels set during World War II, mainly in London. While the initial books are mysteries, and Maggie is a secretary and mathematics tutor to Princess Elizabeth, she is subsequently recruited by the part of the wartime intelligence services known as the Special Operations Executive. The later books in the series are less in the style of mysteries and more in that of spy novels in which Maggie is directly involved with actual historical events.

== Early life and education ==
MacNeal attended Nardin Academy in Buffalo, New York, then graduated cum laude with special honors from Wellesley College in 1991 with a degree in English. She cross-registered for classes at MIT and attended the Radcliffe Publishing Course.

== Career ==
MacNeal's background is in publishing, working as an assistant to novelist John Irving and then as an editor at Random House, Viking Penguin, and Dance Magazine. Her writing career began with two nonfiction books and articles on ballet, modern dance, and puppetry.

MacNeal's first novel, Mr. Churchill’s Secretary, was named as Best Paperback Original of 2012 by Deadly Pleasures, won a Barry Award, and was nominated as Best First Novel by Mystery Writers of America's Edgar Award. Mr. Churchill's Secretary was also nominated as Best First Mystery Novel for Mystery Readers International's Macavity Award in 2013 and for the Independent Mystery Booksellers Association's 2013 Dilys Award

The next book in the Maggie Hope Series, Princess Elizabeth's Spy, was nominated for Macavity Award’s Sue Federer Historical Memorial Award in 2013 Audiofile, and was included on the New York Times Bestseller List on October 29, 2012.

MacNeal's third novel, His Majesty's Hope, also appeared on the New York Times Bestseller List and was named on Oprah.com's Book of the Week and Seven Compulsively Readable Mysteries (for the Crazy-Smart Reader). It was also nominated for an ITW Thriller Award.

His Majesty's Hope was followed by The Prime Minister's Secret Agent, another New York Times Bestseller, and Lefty nominee, and, in 2015, by New York Times-bestseller Mrs. Roosevelt's Confidante, which was nominated for an Agatha Award.

The Queen's Accomplice was a USA Today bestseller, a semi-finalist in the Goodreads Choice Awards, and nominated for a Barry Award.

The Paris Spy was the first book (and seventh) in the Maggie Hope series to be first published in hardcover, followed by a trade paperback edition. It was a New York Times bestseller, Washington Post bestseller, Publishers Weekly bestseller, and was nominated for an Agatha Award. Three further novels followed, with the concluding book in the series, The Last Hope, being published in 2024 to positive reviews.

The Maggie Hope series features many real-life characters including Winston Churchill, Kim Philby, Isoroku Yamamoto, Princess (later Queen) Elizabeth II and Coco Chanel. In Mrs. Roosevelt's Confidant the character John Sterling is based on the author Roald Dahl. The main protagonist, Maggie Hope, was inspired by the real life heroines who worked as secretaries and spies for the Special Operations Executive ("SOE") during WWII and in The Paris Spy (2017) large components of the plot have to do with Vera Atkins' experience as a senior SOE figure.

== Personal life ==
MacNeal married puppeteer Noel MacNeal on November 6, 1999, at the Union Theological Seminary. They live in Brooklyn, New York with their son (b. 2005).

== Publications ==
=== Non-fiction books ===
- Wedding Zen: Simple, Calming Wisdom for the Bride [Chronicle Books, 2004]
- Infused: 100+ Recipes for Infused Liqueurs and Cocktails [Chronicle Books, 2006]

=== Maggie Hope Series ===
- Mr. Churchill's Secretary. Bantam. April 3, 2012. ISBN 9780553593617.
- Princess Elizabeth's Spy. Bantam. October 16, 2012. ISBN 9780553593624.
- His Majesty's Hope. Bantam Dell. May 14, 2013. ISBN 9780345536730.
- The Prime Minister's Secret Agent. Bantam. July 1, 2014. ISBN 9780345536747.
- Mrs. Roosevelt's Confidante. Bantam. October 17, 2015. ISBN 9780804178709.
- The Queen's Accomplice. Bantam. October 4, 2016. ISBN 9780804178723.
- The Paris Spy. Bantam. April 17, 2018. ISBN 9781101965993.
- The Prisoner in the Castle. Bantam. July 30, 2019. ISBN 9780525621096.
- The King's Justice. Bantam. February 2, 2021. ISBN 9781984819598.
- The Hollywood Spy. Bantam. July 6, 2021. ISBN 9780593156926.
- The Last Hope. Bantam. 21 May 2024 | ISBN 9780593156988.

=== Stand Alone Novels ===
- Mother Daughter Traitor Spy: A Novel. Bantam. September 20, 2022. ISBN 9780593156957.
