= Mystery Scene =

American magazine

- Editor: Kate Stine
- Categories: Literary/Entertainment
- Frequency: 5 times yearly
- Publisher: Kate Stine and Brian Skupin
- Founded: 1985
- Company: KBS Communications, LLC
- Country: United States
- Based in: Cedar Rapids, Iowa
- Language: English
- Website: www.mysteryscenemag.com
- ISSN: 1087-674X

Mystery Scene was an American magazine, first published in 1985, that covered the crime and mystery genre with a mix of articles, profiles, criticism, as well as reviews of books, films, TV, short stories, audiobooks, and reference works.

The Winter #174 issue was the final issue of Mystery Scene Magazine. The website is no longer in service.

== Editorial focus & contents ==
Mystery Scene is pitched to mystery readers and fans, as opposed to writers or other industry professionals.

Each issue contains commentary, several articles, author profiles, appreciations of particular subgenres or writers, letters to the editor, and 150+ reviews of new novels, audiobooks, reference works, kid’s mysteries, short stories, TV shows, films, paperback originals, and websites. News items, cartoons, jokes, quotes, and anecdotes round out its front-of-the book “Hints & Allegations” pages.

=== Features ===
Profiles range from best-selling authors, including Lee Child, Michael Connelly, Charlaine Harris, Laurie R. King, Dennis Lehane, Sara Paretsky, and Ian Rankin, to the up-and-coming such as James R. Benn, Michael Koryta, Lisa Lutz, G. M. Malliet, and Stefanie Pintoff.

Articles focus on writers (Daphne du Maurier, Stuart Neville, Edgar Allan Poe, Daphne du Maurier), characters (Trixie Belden, Jack Reacher), films and TV shows (humorous mystery movies, David Simon, The Rockford Files, The Three Maltese Falcons), and subgenres (legal thrillers, romantic suspense, crime novels of the Civil Rights era), among other topics.

=== Regular columns ===
Eye Witness Critic Kevin Burton Smith (The Thrilling Detective Website) commentary on topics relevant to private-eye fiction.
Gormania Novelist (and Mystery Scene's former editor) Edward Gorman comments on the writing life and discusses films, books and TV shows.
Mystery Miscellany Louis Phillips tackles trivia, humor, and tongue-in-cheek teasers.
The Murders in Memory Lane Lawrence Block offers recollections of interesting crime writers he has met over the years.
New Books Essays Authors of upcoming books reveal real-life inspirations, unusual adventures in the name of research, or take a closer look at a story's locale or time period.
Beyond the Book A series by Dick Lochte about classic literary sleuths from Sam Spade to The Saint reappearing in other media formats.

=== Review columns ===
What About Murder? Critic Jon L. Breen reviews mystery nonfiction & reference works.
Small Press Reviews Betty Webb assesses releases from small independent publishers.
Sounds of Suspense Dick Lochte’s audio-book reviews.
Very Original Paperback original novels assessed by Lynne F. Maxwell and Hank Wagner.
Short & Sweet A look at the latest in short stories by Benjamin Boulden, editor of the book blog Gravetapping.
Mystery Scene Reviews Edited by Teri Duerr, each issue offers 30-40 reviews of novels from major publishers, plus reviews of small press titles, mass market paperbacks, audio-book publishers, and nonfiction works. Reviews from 2002 onward are available in the searchable online Mystery Scene Book Review Database.

== History ==
Mystery Scene Magazine was conceived in a phone call between Ed Gorman, a writer and editor of mystery novels, short stories and anthologies, and Robert Randisi, the author of several mystery series, and later the founder and executive director of The Private Eye Writers of America. Both men felt the need for a magazine that would be to the mystery field what Locus was to the science fiction genre—news and views on the genre’s writers and the publishing business. (Over the years, Mystery Scene has evolved into a reader-centered consumer publication although crime writers still have a strong presence at the magazine.)

The first issue, four pages long, was mailed with the October 1985 issue of Mystery & Detective Monthly, a letterzine published by active mystery fan Robert “Cap’n Bob” Napier of Tacoma, Washington.

By the 52-page third issue in 1986, the magazine was no longer distributed with the fanzine, and the now-standard mix of interviews, profiles, news notes, obituaries, reviews, letters columns, and opinion pieces was established. A feature in which first novelists introduced their works would eventually be extended to veteran writers who discussed their latest novels.

The first 75 issues of the magazine form a documentary record of developments, concerns, and controversies in the field over this 17-year period. Short stories appeared occasionally as early as “On Guard” by John Lutz in #5 (September 1986), but they were never a regular feature.

In 1990 Gorman’s business partner, anthologist Martin H. Greenberg, became a co-publisher, and by April 1991, Randisi, whose participation had gradually decreased, sold his stake in the magazine to Greenberg.

In 2002, owners Ed Gorman and Martin H. Greenberg turned over the reins to Kate Stine, a veteran book and magazine editor in the crime and mystery field, and her husband, Brian Skupin, a long-time mystery fan. Stine is editor-in-chief and handles day-to-day operations. Skupin edited the now retired column "What's Happening With" and oversees MysterySceneMag.com. Their first issue, Fall #76 in September 2002, featured a lengthy tribute to outgoing editor and publisher Ed Gorman, "Ed Gorman: Writer, Editor, Mentor," from his many friends in the mystery community.

== Awards won by the magazine ==
2004 Anthony Award for Best Fan Publication presented at the 2004 Bouchercon World Mystery Convention.

2006 Ellery Queen Award for significant contributions to mystery publishing given by the Mystery Writers of America.

2009 Poirot Award for Outstanding Contributions to the Mystery at Malice Domestic XXI in Arlington, Va.

2011 Bouchercon Fan Guests of Honor, Kate Stine and Brian Skupin, 2010 Bouchercon Fan Guests of Honor. Mystery Scene publishers Kate Stine and Brian Skupin were honored at the 2011 Bouchercon held in St. Louis.

== Awards given by the magazine ==
The American Mystery Award is a major award given by Mystery Scene magazine in past years. For example, Richard Hoyt's book Siege (1987) won the American Mystery Award for Best Espionage Novel. The award has been discontinued.
