= Carolyn Wheat =

American writer

- Born: August 8, 1946 (age 80); Green Bay, Wisconsin, United States
- Education: University of Toledo
- Occupation: novelist
- Writing career
- Period: 1983–
- Genre: Mystery

Carolyn Wheat (born August 8, 1946) is an American mystery writer.

== Early life and education ==
Wheat was born on August 8, 1946, in Green Bay, Wisconsin to librarian Mary (née Sensiba) and engineer Lawrence Wheat.

She studied at the University of Toledo, graduating with a Bachelor of Arts in 1968 and a Juris Doctor in 1971.

== Career ==
Wheat is the author of the Cass Jameson series of mystery novels. She was shortlisted for the 1984 Edgar Allan Poe Award for Best First Novel for Dead Men's Thoughts.

In 1996 she won the Agatha Award for best short story for "Accidents Will Happen". That story was also won the 1997 Anthony Awards for best short story. She won the 1997 MacAvity Award for best mystery short story for "Cruel & Unusual" and was shortlisted in 2000 and 2003.

Wheat teaches novel writing at the University of San Diego.

== Works ==
=== Mystery novels ===
- Wheat, Carolyn (1983). Dead Men's Thoughts. St Martin's Press. ISBN 978-0312185015.
- —— (1986). Where Nobody Dies. St. Martin's Press. ISBN 978-0-312-86700-3.
- —— (1995). Fresh Kills. Berkley. ISBN 978-0-425-15276-8.
- —— (1996). Mean Streak. Berkley. ISBN 978-0-425-15317-8.
- —— (1997). Troubled Waters. Berkley. ISBN 978-0-425-15784-8.
- —— (1998). Sworn to Defend. Berkley. ISBN 978-0-425-16303-0.

=== Short stories ===
- Wheat, Carolyn (2000). Tales Out of School. Crippen & Landru. ISBN 1-885941-47-1.

=== Non-fiction ===
- Wheat, Carolyn (2003). How to Write Killer Fiction. Daniel & Daniel. ISBN 978-1880284629.
