= Lia Matera =

Canadian mystery novelist

Lia Matera (born 1952) is a Canadian author of two series of mystery novels and short stories.

== Biography ==
Matera was born in 1952 in Canada. She graduated from Hastings College of Law in 1981. She was a teaching fellow at Stanford Law School in the early 1980s. She lives in Santa Cruz, California.

Matera is known for the Willa Jansson series and the Laura Di Palma series.

== Critical reception ==
Two of Matera's works have received starred reviews from Booklist: Face Value (Simon & Schuster, 1994) and Last Chants (Simon & Schuster, 1996).

=== Awards ===
- Anthony and Macavity Award nominations, 1990, for The Good Fight
- Edgar Award nomination, 1991, for Prior Convictions
- Edgar Award and Anthony Award nominations, 1991, for A Radical Departure
- Anthony Award and Macavity Award nominations, 1991, for Where Lawyers Fear to Tread
- Shamus Award for Best Short Story, 1996, for "Dead Drunk"

== Selected works ==
=== Willa Jansson series ===
1. Where Lawyers Fear to Tread, Bantam, 1987.
2. A Radical Departure, Bantam, 1988.
3. Hidden Agenda, Bantam, 1988.
4. Prior Convictions, Simon & Schuster, 1991.
5. Last Chants, Simon & Schuster, 1996.
6. Star Witness, Simon & Schuster, 1997.
7. Havana Twist, Simon & Schuster, 1998.

=== Laura DiPalma series ===
1. The Smart Money, Bantam, 1988.
2. The Good Fight, Simon & Schuster, 1990.
3. A Hard Bargain, Simon & Schuster, 1992.
4. Face Value, Simon & Schuster, 1994.
5. Designer Crimes, Simon & Schuster, 1995.

=== As contributor ===
- (Editor) Irreconcilable Differences, HarperCollins, 1999.
- Counsel for the Defense and Other Stories, Five Star, 2000.
- Edgar and Shamus Go Golden. Down & Out Books, 2022.
