= Sophie Littlefield =

American novelist

- Born: Missouri, U.S.
- Education: Indiana University (BS)
- Occupation: Author
- Writing career
- Genres: Women's fiction; crime fiction; young adult literature
- Notable awards: Anthony Award (2010)

Sophie Littlefield is an American author of women's fiction, crime fiction, and young-adult novels. In 2010, she was nominated for the Edgar and won an Anthony Award for Best First Novel: A Bad Day for Sorry. Littlefield was born in Missouri and resides in San Francisco, California. She has a Bachelor of Science in computer science from Indiana University. She has served as president for the San Francisco chapter of Romance Writers of America.

== Books ==
Standalone novels

- The Guilty One (2015) Gallery Books
- The Missing Place (2014) Gallery Books
- Garden of Stones (2013) Harlequin MIRA
- House of Glass (2014) Harlequin MIRA
- Hanging by a Thread (2012) Delacorte Books for Young Readers

Stella Hardesty crime series

- A Bad Day for Sorry (2009) Minotaur Books 2010 Anthony Award for Best First Novel
- A Bad Day for Pretty (2010) Minotaur Books
- A Bad Day for Scandal (2011) Minotaur Books
- A Bad Day for Mercy (2012) Minotaur Books
- A Bad Day for Romance (2013) Minotaur Books

Aftertime series

- Aftertime (2011) Luna
- Rebirth (2011) Luna
- Horizon (2012) Luna

Joe Bashir crime series

- Blood Bond (2012) Pocket Star
- Shattered Bond (2013) Pocket Star

Hailey Tarbell series

- Banished (2010) Delacorte Books for Young Readers
- Unforsaken (2011) Delacorte Books for Young Readers
