= A Bad Day for Sorry =

2009 novel by Sophie Littlefield

- Author: Sophie Littlefield
- Genre: Mystery fiction, Thriller
- Published: 2009
- Publisher: Minotaur Books
- Pages: 288
- Awards: Anthony Award for Best First Novel (2010)
- ISBN: 978-0-312-55920-5
- Website: A Bad Day for Sorry

A Bad Day for Sorry is a novel written by Sophie Littlefield and published by Minotaur Books on August 4, 2009. It later went on to win the Anthony Award for Best First Novel in 2010.
