= Terence Faherty =

American author of mystery novels

- Born: 1954 (age 71–72); Trenton, New Jersey, U.S.
- Education: Rider College
- Occupations: Author; technical writer
- Spouse: Jan
- Writing career
- Genre: Mystery fiction
- Notable awards: Shamus Award (1997)

Terence Faherty (born 1954) is an American author of mystery novels.

== Personal ==
Faherty was born in Trenton, New Jersey. He graduated from Rider College and became a technical writer at a bank in Indianapolis, Indiana, where he currently lives with his wife, Jan. He wrote his first novel, Deadstick, in 1981, but it was rejected for publication. In 1990, he was encouraged to resubmit the manuscript to St. Martin's Press, which published it.

== Books ==
Faherty was nominated for an Edgar Award for Deadstick, his debut novel. Come Back Dead was honored with the 1997 Shamus Award for best Best Private Eye Novel. Faherty has also written two mystery series.

=== The Owen Keane Mysteries ===
The Owen Keane series are contemporary novels whose main character dropped out of a Roman Catholic seminary based on the School of Theology at St. Meinrad Archabbey. The series contains seven novels and one collection of short stories:

- Deadstick - 1991
- Live to Regret - 1992
- The Lost Keats - 1993 (a "prequel" to Deadstick)
- Die Dreaming - 1994
- Prove the Nameless - 1996
- The Ordained - 1998
- Orion Rising - 2001
- Eastward in Eden - 2013
- The Confessions of Owen Keane (short stories) - Crippen & Landru, 2005

=== The Scott Elliott Mysteries ===
The Scott Elliott books are set in post-World War II Hollywood, when the glamor of old Hollywood was fading. Elliott, a former actor and soldier turned private security operative, fights a rearguard action throughout the series, trying to protect the dying Hollywood, for which, as he might put it, he carries a torch.

- Kill Me Again - 1996
- Come Back Dead - 1997
- Raise the Devil - 2000
- In a Teapot - 2005
- Dance in the Dark - 2011
- Play a Cold Hand - 2017
- The Hollywood Op (short stories) - Perfect Crime, 2011
