= Deborah Crombie =

American novelist

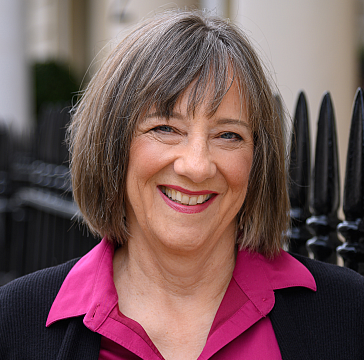
- Crombie in London, 2022.
- Born: Deborah Darden; Dallas, Texas, U.S.
- Education: Austin College
- Occupation: Author
- Writing career
- Language: English
- Genre: Mystery
- Notable work: Dreaming of the Bones
- Notable awards: Macavity Award, 1998, 2009; New York Times Book of the Year, 1997
- Website: deborahcrombie.com

Deborah Crombie (née Darden) is an American author of the Duncan Kincaid / Gemma James mystery series set in the United Kingdom. Crombie was raised in Richardson, Texas, and has lived in the United Kingdom. She now lives in McKinney, Texas.

Crombie studied biology at Austin College and was a writing student of Warren Norwood at Tarrant County College.

== Bibliography ==
Duncan Kincaid & Gemma James series

- A Share in Death (1993; ISBN 978-0-425-14197-7)
- All Shall be Well (1994; ISBN 978-0-684-19654-1)
- Leave the Grave Green (1995; ISBN 978-0-684-19770-8)
- Mourn Not Your Dead (1996; ISBN 978-0-684-80131-5)
- Dreaming of the Bones (1997; ISBN 978-0-684-80141-4)
- Kissed a Sad Goodbye (1999; ISBN 978-0-553-10943-6)
- A Finer End (2001; ISBN 978-0-553-10956-6)
- And Justice There is None (2002; ISBN 978-0-553-10973-3)
- Now May You Weep (2003; ISBN 978-0-06-052523-1)
- In a Dark House (2005; ISBN 978-1-4050-3441-8)
- Water Like a Stone (2007; ISBN 978-0-06-052527-9)
- Where Memories Lie (2008; ISBN 978-0-06-128751-0)
- Necessary as Blood (2009; ISBN 978-0-06-128753-4)
- "Nocturne" (2012; short story, limited-edition e-book)
- No Mark upon Her (2012; ISBN 978-0-06-199061-8)
- The Sound of Broken Glass (2013; ISBN 978-0-06-199063-2)
- To Dwell in Darkness (2014; ISBN 978-0-06-227160-0)
- Garden of Lamentations (2017; ISBN 978-006227163-1)
- A Bitter Feast (2019; ISBN 9780062986788)
- A Killing of Innocents (2023; ISBN 978-0062993397)
