= Stuart Neville =

Northern Irish writer

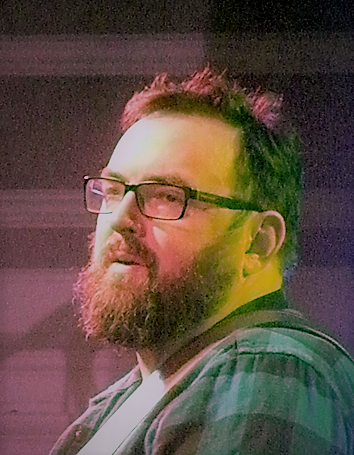
- Stuart Neville playing with the Fun Lovin' Crime Writers at Bloody Scotland, 2018
- Born: 1972 (age 53–54); Armagh, Northern Ireland
- Occupations: Novelist, short story writer
- Writing career
- Genres: Mystery, Thriller
- Website: www.stuartneville.com

Stuart Neville (born 1972) is a Northern Irish author best known for his novel The Twelve or, as it is known in the United States, The Ghosts of Belfast. He was born and grew up in Armagh, Northern Ireland.

== Works ==
The Twelve was placed on the Best of 2009 lists by both The New York Times and Los Angeles Times. The book has been given full reviews in a number of publications in the United States, Ireland and the United Kingdom, appearing in The New York Times, The Irish Times, Los Angeles Times, Publishers Weekly and The Guardian, among others.

Collusion, the sequel to The Twelve, was published in the United Kingdom by Harvill Secker in August 2010, and in the US by Soho Press in October 2010. The book was reviewed in New York Journal of Books.

Ratlines was published in January 2013 in the US by Soho Crime. It was reviewed in New York Journal of Books.

=== Critic ===
Stuart Neville has written review essays and book reviews for the Irish Times and Irish Independent.

== Awards and nominations ==
The Ghosts of Belfast, the American edition of The Twelve, won the Mystery/Thriller category of the Los Angeles Times Book Prize in April 2010. It also won the New Voice category of the 2010 Spinetingler Awards, and was nominated for the 2010 Dilys Award, Anthony Award, Barry Award, and Macavity Award.

== Bibliography ==
=== Novels ===
- The Twelve (2009; published in the United States in 2012 as The Ghosts of Belfast)
- Collusion (2010)
- Stolen Souls (2012)
- Ratlines (2013)
- The Final Silence (2014)
- Those We Left Behind (2015)
- So Say the Fallen (2016)
- Here and Gone (writing as Haylen Beck) (2017)
- Lost You (writing as Haylen Beck) (2019)
- The House of Ashes (2021)
- Blood Like Mine (2024)

=== Short stories ===
- Requiems for the Departed (2010; co-contributor to short story collection)
- The Traveller and Other Stories (2020; collection of short stories)
