= G. M. Malliet =

American novelist

G. M. Malliet is an American author of mystery novels and short stories. She is best known as the author of the award-winning Detective Chief Inspector St. Just mysteries and the Rev. Max Tudor mysteries. The first book in her US-based series, Augusta Hawke, appeared in 2022.

Malliet's first books followed DCI St. Just on a series of cases, all of which involved writers of mystery novels and other genres. Her second series, the Max Tudor mysteries, takes place in the fictional English town of Nether Monkslip, and features a vicar who is a former MI5 agent. Her third series, the Augusta Hawke mysteries, takes place in Old Town, Virginia, US, and features a crime writer turned sleuth and private eye.

== Awards and honors ==
Her first novel, Death of a Cozy Writer, won the 2008 Agatha Award for Best First Novel, and her books Wicked Autumn, A Fatal Winter, Pagan Spring, and A Demon Summer have all been short-listed for the Agatha Best Novel award. She received a Malice Domestic Grant in 2003 to write Death of a Cozy Writer.

Malliet's books Death of a Cozy Writer and Death and the Lit Chick were both nominated for Anthony Awards. Death of a Cozy Writer was also nominated for the Macavity Award for Best First Mystery. Several of her short stories - published in anthologies, in Ellery Queen Mystery Magazine, and in The Strand - have been nominated for writing awards.

She is represented by Mark Gottlieb of Trident Media Group in New York City.

== Books ==
=== Max Tudor Series ===
1. Wicked Autumn, St. Martin's Press, 2011
2. A Fatal Winter, St. Martin's Press, 2012
3. Pagan Spring, St. Martin's Press, 2013
4. A Demon Summer, St. Martin's Press, 2014
5. The Haunted Season, St. Martin's Press, 2015
6. Devil's Breath, St. Martin's Press, 2017
7. In Prior's Wood, St. Martin's Press, 2018
8. The Washing Away of Wrongs, Little, Brown, 2023

=== St. Just Series ===
1. Death of a Cozy Writer, Midnight Ink, 2008
2. Death and the Lit Chick, Midnight Ink, 2009
3. Death at the Alma Mater, Midnight Ink, 2010
4. Death in Cornwall, Canongate/Severn House, 2021
5. Death in Print, Canongate/Severn House, 2023
6. Death and the Old Master, Canongate/Severn House, 2024
7. Death and the Final Cut, Canongate/Severn House, 2025
8. Death Comes as a Footnote, Canongate/Severn House, 2026

=== Augusta Hawke Series ===
1. Augusta Hawke, Canongate/Severn House, 2022
2. Invitation to a Killer, Canongate/Severn House, 2023

=== Standalone Suspense ===
1. Weycombe, Midnight Ink, 2017
