= Left Coast Crime =

Annual mystery conference

Left Coast Crime is an annual conference organised by mystery fiction fans for mystery fiction fans, first held in San Francisco in 1991. It is concerned with western North American region mysteries, but the conference itself travels worldwide, having been held in Canada and the United Kingdom, as well as different parts of the United States. The conference enables fans to mix with authors. A prominent author of western mystery fiction is invited to be guest speaker.

In December 2019 Mystery Writers of America awarded the convention organization the 2020 Raven Award for "outstanding achievement in the mystery field outside the realm of creative writing."

== Lefty Awards ==
=== Best Humorous Mystery Novel Award ===
Conference participants have voted on an award for the most humorous mystery novel since 1996.

Best Humorous Mystery Novel Award, winners and finalists
Year	Author	Title	Result	Ref.
1996	Alan Russell	The Fat Innkeeper	Winner	
1996	G. M. Ford	Who in Hell Is Wanda Fuca?	Finalist	
1996	Kinky Friedman	God Bless John Wayne	Finalist	
1996	Parnell Hall	Movie	Finalist	
1996	Joan Hess	Miracles in Maggody	Finalist	
1996	Sharan McCrumb	If I'd Killed Him When I Met Him	Finalist	
1997	No award presented			
1998	Janet Evanovich	Three to Get Deadly	Winner	
1998	Margaret Chittenden	Dead Men Don't Dance	Finalist	
1998	Parnell Hall	Scam	Finalist	
1998	Sarah Shankman	I Still Miss My Man But My Aim Is Getting Better	Finalist	
1998	Don Winslow	The Death and Life of Bobby Z	Finalist	
1999	Janet Evanovich	Four to Score	Winner	
2000	Donna Andrews	Murder With Peacocks	Winner	
2000	Dave Barry	Big Trouble	Finalist	
2000	Janet Evanovich	High Five	Finalist	
2000	Jerrilyn Farmer	Immaculate Reception	Finalist	
2000	Anne George	Murder Shoots the Bull	Finalist	
2001	No award presented			
2002	Jerrilyn Farmer	Dim Sum Dead	Winner	
2002	Bill Fitzhugh	Fender Benders	Winner	
2002	Donna Andrews	Revenge of the Wrought-Iron Flamingos	Finalist	
2002	Selma Eichler	Murder Can Upset Your Mother	Finalist	
2002	Susan Isaacs	Long Time No See	Finalist	
2003	Tim Cockey	The Hearse Case Scenario	Winner	
2003	Brian M. Wiprud	Pipsqueak	Winner	
2003	Janet Evanovich	Hard Eight	Finalist	
2003	Laura Levine	This Pen for Hire	Finalist	
2003	Fidelis Morgan	The Rival Queens	Finalist	
2003	Ben Rehder	Buck Fever	Finalist	
2004	Jerrilyn Farmer	Mumbo Gumbo	Winner	
2004	Donna Andrews	Crouching Buzzard, Leaping Loon	Finalist	
2004	Elaine Viets	Shop Till You Drop	Finalist	
2005	Donna Andrews	We'll Always Have Parrots	Winner	
2005	Ruth Dudley Edwards	Carnage on the Committee	Finalist	
2005	Nancy Fairbanks	Holy Guacamole	Finalist	
2005	Jerrilyn Farmer	Perfect Sax	Finalist	
2005	Susan McBride	Blue Blood	Finalist	
2006	Peter Guttridge	Cast Adrift	Winner	
2006	Liz Evans	Cue the Easter Bunny	Finalist	
2006	Jasper Fforde	The Big Over Easy	Finalist	
2006	Bill Fitzhugh	Highway 61 Resurfaced	Finalist	
2006	Charlie Williams	Fags and Lager	Finalist	
2007	Donna Moore	Go to Helena Handbasket	Winner	
2007	Donna Andrews	No Nest for the Wicket	Finalist	
2007	Steve Brewer	Monkey Man	Finalist	
2007	Troy Cook	47 Rules of Highly Effective Bank Robbers	Finalist	
2007	Elaine Viets	Murder Unleashed	Finalist	
2008	Elaine Viets	Murder with Reservations	Winner	
2008	Donna Andrews	The Penguin Who Knew Too Much	Finalist	
2008	Don Bruns	Stuff to Die For	Finalist	
2008	Jeffrey Cohen	Some Like It Hot-Buttered	Finalist	
2008	Jess Lourey	Knee High by the Fourth of July	Finalist	
2009	Tim Maleeny	Greasing the Piñata	Winner	
2009	Donna Andrews	Six Geese A-Slaying	Finalist	
2009	Jeffrey Cohen	It Happened One Knife	Finalist	
2009	Sue Ann Jaffarian	Thugs & Kisses	Finalist	
2009	N. M. Kelby	Murder at the Bad Girl's Bar and Grill	Finalist	
2009	Rita Lakin	Getting Old Is to Die For	Finalist	
2010	Rita Lakin	Getting Old Is a Disaster	Winner	
2010	Donna Andrews	Swan for the Money	Finalist	
2010	Mike Befeler	Living with Your Kids Is Murder	Finalist	
2010	Denise Dietz	Strangle a Loaf of Italian Bread	Finalist	
2010	Kris Neri	High Crimes on the Magical Plane	Finalist	
2011	J. Michael Orenduff	The Pot Thief Who Studied Einstein	Winner	
2011	Donna Andrews	Stork Raving Mad	Finalist	
2011	Laura DiSilverio	Swift Justice	Finalist	
2011	Donna Moore	Old Dogs	Finalist	
2011	Kris Neri	Revenge for Old Times' Sake	Finalist	
2012	Donna Andrews	The Real Macaw	Winner	
2012	Rita Lakin	Getting Old Can Kill You	Finalist	
2012	Jess Lourey	October Fest	Finalist	
2012	Kris Neri	Magical Alienation	Finalist	
2012	Cindy Sample	Dying for a Dance	Finalist	
2012	John Vorhaus	The Albuquerque Turkey	Finalist	
2013	Brad Parks	The Girl Next Door	Winner	
2013	Mike Befeler	Cruising in Your Eighties Is Murder	Finalist	
2013	Laura DiSilverio	Swift Run	Finalist	
2013	Jess Lourey	December Dread	Finalist	
2013	Lisa Lutz	Trail of the Spellmans	Finalist	
2013	Nancy G. West	Fit to Be Dead	Finalist	
2014	Brad Parks	The Good Cop	Winner	
2014	Donna Andrews	The Hen of the Baskervilles	Finalist	
2014	Timothy Hallinan	The Fame Thief	Finalist	
2014	Lisa Lutz	The Last Word	Finalist	
2014	Cindy Sample	Dying for a Daiquiri	Finalist	
2015	Timothy Hallinan	Herbie's Game	Winner	
2015	Donna Andrews	The Good, the Bad, and the Emus	Finalist	
2015	Jess Lourey	January Thaw	Finalist	
2015	Cindy Sample	Dying for a Dude	Finalist	
2015	Diane Vallere	Suede to Rest	Finalist	
2016	Donna Andrews	Lord of the Wings	Winner	
2016	Ellen Byron	Plantation Shudders	Finalist	
2016	Jess Lourey	February Fever	Finalist	
2016	Cindy Sample	Dying for a Donut	Finalist	
2016	Diane Vallere	Crushed Velvet	Finalist	
2017	Ellen Byron	Body on the Bayou	Winner	
2017	Donna Andrews	Die Like an Eagle	Finalist	
2017	Timothy Hallinan	Fields Where They Lay	Finalist	
2017	Heather Haven	The CEO Came DOA	Finalist	
2017	Johnny Shaw	Floodgate	Finalist	
2017	Diane Vallere	The Disguise To Die For	Finalist	
2018	Ellen Byron	A Cajun Christmas Killing	Winner	
2018	Donna Andrews	Gone Gull	Finalist	
2018	Marla Cooper	Dying on the Vine	Finalist	
2018	Cynthia Kuhn	The Art of Vanishing	Finalist	
2018	Cindy Sample	Dying for a Diamond	Finalist	
2019	Catriona McPherson	Scot Free	Winner	
2019	Ellen Byron	Mardi Gras Murder	Finalist	
2019	Kellye Garrett	Hollywood Ending	Finalist	
2019	Timothy Hallinan	Nighttown	Finalist	
2019	Leslie Karst	Death al Fresco	Finalist	
2019	Cynthia Kuhn	The Spirit in Question	Finalist	
2020	Catriona McPherson	Scot & Soda	Winner	
2020	Ellen Byron	Fatal Cajun Festival	Finalist	
2020	Leslie Karst	Murder from Scratch	Finalist	
2020	Cynthia Kuhn	The Subject of Malice	Finalist	
2020	Wendall Thomas	Drowned Under	Finalist	
2021	Ellen Byron	Murder in the Bayou Boneyard	Winner	
2021	Jennifer J. Chow	Mimi Lee Gets a Clue	Finalist	
2021	Carl Hiaasen	Squeeze Me	Finalist	
2021	Cynthia Kuhn	The Study of Secrets	Finalist	
2021	J. Michael Orenduff	The Pot Thief Who Studied the Woman at Otowi Crossing	Finalist	
2021	Sung J. Woo	Skin Deep	Finalist	
2022	Rachel V. Reyes	Mango, Mambo, and Murder	Winner	
2022	Ellen Byron	Cajun Kiss of Death	Finalist	
2022	Jennifer Chow	Mimi Lee Cracks the Code	Finalist	
2022	Elle Cosimano	Finlay Donovan Is Killing It	Finalist	
2022	Cynthia Kuhn	How to Book a Murder	Finalist	
2022	Wendall Thomas	Fogged Off	Finalist	

=== Best Historical Mystery Novel ===
The Best Historical Mystery Novel Award, also known as the Bruce Alexander Memorial Historical Mystery Award, established in 2004, is presented "to mystery novels covering events before 1960."

Best Historical Mystery Novel, winners and finalists
Year	Author	Title	Result	Ref.
2004	Rhys Bowen	For the Love of Mike	Winner	
2004	Ann Parker	Silver Lies	Finalist	
2004	Mary Reed and Eric Mayer	Four for a Boy	Finalist	
2005	Sharan Newman	The Witch in the Well	Winner	
2005	Mary Reed and Eric Mayer	Five for Silver	Finalist	
2005	Priscilla Royal	Tyrant of the Mind	Finalist	
2005	Victoria Thompson	Murder on Marble Row	Finalist	
2005	Jacqueline Winspear	Birds of a Feather	Finalist	
2006	Tony Broadbent	Spectres in the Smoke	Winner	
2006	Maureen Jennings	Night's Child	Finalist	
2006	Jacqueline Winspear	Pardonable Lies	Finalist	
2007	No award presented			
2008	No award presented			
2009	Kelli Stanley	Nox Dormienda, a Long Night for Sleeping	Winner	
2009	Tasha Alexander	A Fatal Waltz	Finalist	
2009	Rhys Bowen	A Royal Pain	Finalist	
2009	Rhys Bowen	Tell Me, Pretty Maiden	Finalist	
2009	Laurie R. King	Touchstone	Finalist	
2010	Rebecca Cantrell	The Trace of Smoke	Winner	
2010	Tasha Alexander	Tears of Pearl	Finalist	
2010	Rhys Bowen	In a Gilded Cage	Finalist	
2010	Gary Phillips	Freedom's Flight	Finalist	
2010	Jeri Westerson	Serpent in the Thorns	Finalist	
2011	Jacqueline Winspear	The Mapping of Love and Death	Winner	
2011	Rebecca Cantrell	The Night of Long Knives	Finalist	
2011	Robert Kresge	Murder for Greenhorns	Finalist	
2011	Kelli Stanley	City of Dragons	Finalist	
2011	Jeri Westerson	The Demon's Parchment	Finalist	
2012	Ann Parker	Mercury's Rise	Winner	
2012	Rhys Bowen	Naughty in Nice	Finalist	
2012	Rebecca Cantrell	The Game of Lies	Finalist	
2012	Priscilla Royal	The Killing Season	Finalist	
2012	Jeri Westerson	Troubled Bones	Finalist	
2012	Jacqueline Winspear	The Lesson in Secrets	Finalist	
2013	Catriona McPherson	Dandy Gilver and an Unsuitable Day for a Murder	Winner	
2013	Rhys Bowen	The Twelve Clues of Christmas	Finalist	
2013	Rebecca Cantrell	The City of Broken Glass	Finalist	
2013	Dennis Lehane	Live by Night	Finalist	
2013	Jacqueline Winspear	Elegy for Eddie	Finalist	
2014	Catriona McPherson	Dandy Gilver and a Bothersome Number of Corpses	Winner	
2014	Rhys Bowen	Heirs and Graces	Finalist	
2014	Susan Elia MacNeal	His Majesty's Hope	Finalist	
2014	David Morrell	Murder as a Fine Art	Finalist	
2014	Priscilla Royal	Covenant with Hell	Finalist	
2014	Jacqueline Winspear	Leaving Everything Most Loved	Finalist	
2015	Catriona McPherson	The Deadly Measure of Brimstone	Winner	
2015	Rhys Bowen	Queen of Hearts	Finalist	
2015	Susanna Calkins	From the Charred Remains	Finalist	
2015	Kelli Stanley	City of Ghosts	Finalist	
2015	Jeri Westerson	Cup of Blood	Finalist	
2016	Rhys Bowen	Malice at the Palace	Winner	
2016	Susanna Calkins	The Masque of a Murderer	Finalist	
2016	Heather Haven	The Chocolate Kiss-Off	Finalist	
2016	Jennifer Kincheloe	The Secret Life of Anna Blanc	Finalist	
2016	Laurie R. King	Dreaming Spies	Finalist	
2016	Susan Elia MacNeal	Mrs. Roosevelt's Confidante	Finalist	
2017	Catriona McPherson	The Reek of Red Herrings	Winner	
2017	Rhys Bowen	Crowned and Dangerous	Finalist	
2017	Susanna Calkins	The Death Along the River Fleet	Finalist	
2017	Laurie R. King	The Murder of Mary Russell	Finalist	
2017	Ann Parker	What Gold Buys	Finalist	
2018	Rhys Bowen	In Farleigh Field	Winner	
2018	Jennifer Kincheloe	The Woman in the Camphor Trunk	Finalist	
2018	Renee Patrick	Dangerous to Know	Finalist	
2018	Priscilla Royal	The Proud Sinner	Finalist	
2018	Jeri Westerson	Season of Blood	Finalist	
2019	Sujata Massey	The Widows of Malabar Hill	Winner	
2019	Rhys Bowen	Four Funerals and Maybe a Wedding	Finalist	
2019	David Corbett	The Long-Lost Love Letters of Doc Holliday	Finalist	
2019	Laurie R. King	Island of the Mad	Finalist	
2019	Ann Parker	A Dying Note	Finalist	
2019	Iona Whishaw	It Begins in Betrayal	Finalist	
2020	Sujata Massey	The Satapur Moonstone	Winner	
2020	Susanna Calkins	Murder Knocks Twice	Finalist	
2020	L. A. Chandlar	The Pearl Dagger	Finalist	
2020	Dianne Freeman	A Lady's Guide to Gossip and Murder	Finalist	
2020	Jennifer Kincheloe	The Body in Griffith Park	Finalist	
2021	Catriona McPherson	The Turning Tide	Winner	
2021	Susanna Calkins	The Fate of a Flapper	Finalist	
2021	Dianne Freeman	A Lady's Guide to Mischief and Murder	Finalist	
2021	Laurie R. King	Riviera Gold	Finalist	
2021	Ann Parker	Mortal Music	Finalist	
2021	James W. Ziskin	Turn to Stone	Finalist	
2022	Naomi Hirahara	Clark and Division	Winner	
2022	Susanna Calkins	The Cry of the Hangman	Finalist	
2022	John Copenhaver	The Savage Kind	Finalist	
2022	Sujata Massey	The Bombay Prince	Finalist	
2022	Catriona McPherson	The Mirror Dance	Finalist	
2022	Lori Rader-Day	Death at Greenway	Finalist	

=== Best Mystery Novel ===
Best Mystery Novel, winners and finalists
Year	Author	Title	Result	Ref.
2017	Louise Penny	The Great Reckoning	Winner	
2017	Matt Coyle	Dark Fissures	Finalist	
2017	Gigi Pandian	Michelangelo's Ghost	Finalist	
2017	Terry Shames	The Necessary Murder of Nonie Blake	Finalist	
2017	James W. Ziskin	Heart of Stone	Finalist	
2018	William Kent Krueger	Sulfur Springs	Winner	
2018	Matt Coyle	Blood Truth	Finalist	
2018	Louise Penny	Glass Houses	Finalist	
2018	Terry Shames	An Unsettling Crime for Samuel Craddock	Finalist	
2018	James W. Ziskin	Cast the First Stone	Finalist	
2019	Lou Berney	November Road	Winner	
2019	Matt Coyle	Wrong Light	Finalist	
2019	Louise Penny	Kingdom of the Blind	Finalist	
2019	Lori Rader-Day	Under a Dark Sky	Finalist	
2019	Terry Shames	A Reckoning in the Back Country	Finalist	
2019	James W. Ziskin	A Stone's Throw	Finalist	
2020	Matt Coyle	Lost Tomorrows	Winner	
2020	Steph Cha	Your House Will Pay	Finalist	
2020	Tracy Clark	Borrowed Time	Finalist	
2020	Rachel Howzell Hall	They All Fall Down	Finalist	
2020	Attica Locke	Heaven, My Home	Finalist	
2021	Louise Penny	All the Devils Are Here	Winner	
2021	Tracy Clark	What You Don't See	Finalist	
2021	S. A. Cosby	Blacktop Wasteland	Finalist	
2021	Matt Coyle	Blind Vigil	Finalist	
2021	Rachel Howzell Hall	And Now She's Gone	Finalist	
2022	William Kent Krueger	Lightning Strike	Winner	
2022	Tracy Clark	Runner	Finalist	
2022	S. A. Cosby	Razorblade Tears	Finalist	
2022	Matt Coyle	Last Redemption	Finalist	
2022	P. J. Vernon	Bath Haus	Finalist	

=== Best Début Mystery ===
The Lefty for Best Debut Mystery has gone by many names, include the Eureka! Award (2012), the Rosebud Award (2015), and finally, the Left for Best Debut Mystery.

Best Début Mystery, winners and finalists
Year	Author	Title	Result	Ref.
2012	Darrell James	Nazareth Child	Winner	
2012	Rochelle Staab	Who Do, Voodoo?	Finalist	
2012	Sally Carpenter	The Baffled Beatlemaniac Caper	Finalist	
2012	Tammy Kaehler	Dead Man's Switch	Finalist	
2015	Allen Eskens	The Life We Bury	Winner	
2015	Lisa Alber	Kilmoon	Finalist	
2015	M.P. Cooley	Ice Shear	Finalist	
2015	Lori Rader-Day	The Black Hour	Finalist	
2015	Holly West	Mistress of Fortune	Finalist	
2017	Alexia Gordon	Murder in G Major	Winner	
2017	Sarah M. Chen	Cleaning Up Finn	Finalist	
2017	Marla Cooper	Terror in Taffeta	Finalist	
2017	Nadine Nettmann	Decanting a Murder	Finalist	
2017	Renee Patrick	Design for Dying	Finalist	
2018	Kellye Garrett	Hollywood Homicide	Winner	
2018	Susan Alice Bickford	A Short Time To Die	Finalist	
2018	Wendall Thomas	Lost Luggage	Finalist	
2018	Nancy Tingley	A Head in Cambodia	Finalist	
2018	Kathleen Valenti	Protocol	Finalist	
2019	Dianne Freeman	A Lady's Guide to Etiquette and Murder	Winner	
2019	Tracy Clark	Broken Places	Finalist	
2019	A. J. Devlin	Cobra Clutch	Finalist	
2019	A. J. Finn	The Woman in the Window	Finalist	
2019	Aimee Hix	What Doesn't Kill You	Finalist	
2019	Keenan Powell	Deadly Solution	Finalist	
2019	J.G. Toews	Give Out Creek	Finalist	
2020	Carl Vonderau	Murderabilia	Winner	
2020	Tori Eldridge	The Ninja Daughter	Finalist	
2020	Angie Kim	Miracle Creek	Finalist	
2020	Tara Laskowski	One Night Gone	Finalist	
2020	John Vercher	Three-Fifths	Finalist	
2021	David Heska Wanbli Weiden	Winter Counts	Winner	
2021	Daisy Bateman	Murder Goes to Market	Finalist	
2021	Mary Keliikoa	Derailed	Finalist	
2021	Erica Ruth Neubauer	Murder at the Mena House	Finalist	
2021	Richard Osman	The Thursday Murder Club	Finalist	
2021	Halley Sutton	The Lady Upstairs	Finalist	
2022	Wanda M. Morris	All Her Little Secrets	Winner	
2022	Alexandra Andrews	Who Is Maud Dixon	Finalist	
2022	Marco Carocari	Blackout	Finalist	
2022	Zakiya Dalila Harris	The Other Black Girl	Finalist	
2022	Mia P. Manansala	Arsenic and Adobo	Finalist	

=== Wildcard Awards ===
In addition to regular Lefty Awards, wildcard awards have occasionally been presented. One regularly occurring wild card award is based on geographical location, with its name changing depending upon the location of the convention, such as the Otter (Monterey, 2004), the Calavera (El Paso, 2005), the Rocky (Denver, 2008; Colorado Springs, 2013), and the Rose (Portland, 2015). Left Coast Crime has also presented awards according to other geographic regions, such as the Hillerman Sky (Southwest settings, 2011), the Golden Nugget (California settings, 2012), the Squid (US settings, 2014), and the Calamari (non-US settings, 2014).

Other wildcard awards "include the Watson, for the mystery with the best sidekick (Santa Fe 2011 & Colorado Springs 2013), and the Hawaii Five-O, for best law enforcement or police procedural (Waikoloa, Hawaii 2009). The Panik award was given in memory of Paul Anik for best LA noir (Los Angeles 2010). Cover art was recognized with the Arty (Denver 2008)."

Wildcard Award winners and finalists
Award	Year	Author	Title	Result	Ref.
Otter Award (Note: The Otter Award was presented to the "best mystery set in the LCC region")	2004	Meg Chittenden	More Than You Know	Winner	
Otter Award	2004	David Cole	Dragonfly Bones	Finalist	
Otter Award	2004	Emily Toll	Murder Pans Out	Finalist	
Calavera Award (Note: The Calavera Award was presented to the "best mystery set in the LCC region")	2005	Rochelle Krich	Grave Endings	Winner	
Calavera Award	2005	Meg Chittenden	Snap Shot	Finalist	
Calavera Award	2005	David Cole	Shadow Play	Finalist	
Calavera Award	2005	L.C. Hayden	What Others Know	Finalist	
Calavera Award	2005	Twist Phelan	Family Claims	Finalist	
Arty Award (Note: The Arty Award was presented to the novel with the "best cover art")	2008	Rhys Bowen	Her Royal Spyness	Winner	
Arty Award	2008	Megan Abbott	Queenpin	Finalist	
Arty Award	2008	Laura Benedict	Isabella Moon	Finalist	
Arty Award	2008	Ken Isaacson	Silent Counsel	Finalist	
Arty Award	2008	Tim Maleeny	Stealing the Dragon	Finalist	
Rocky Award (Note: The Rocky Award was presented to the "best mystery set in the LCC region")	2008	Margaret Coel	The Girl with Braided Hair	Winner	
Rocky Award	2008	C. J. Box	Free Fire	Finalist	
Rocky Award	2008	Bill Cameron	Lost Dog	Finalist	
Rocky Award	2008	Tim Maleeny	Stealing the Dragon	Finalist	
Rocky Award	2008	Twist Phelan	False Fortune	Finalist	
Hawaii Five-O (Note: The Hawaii Five-O Award was presented to the best novel including "law enforcement" and/or "police procedural" material)	2009	Neil S. Plakcy	Mahu Fire	Winner	
Hawaii Five-O	2009	Baron Birtcher	Angels Fall	Finalist	
Hawaii Five-O	2009	Kate Flora	The Angel of Knowlton Park	Finalist	
Hawaii Five-O	2009	Åsa Larsson	The Black Path	Finalist	
Hawaii Five-O	2009	G.M. Malliet	Death of a Cozy Writer	Finalist	
Hawaii Five-O	2009	Karin Slaughter	Fractured	Finalist	
The Panik (Note: The Panik Award was presented "in honor of the late Paul Anik for the best Los Angeles Noir")	2010	Linda Richards	Death Was in the Picture	Winner	
The Panik	2010	Gar Anthony Haywood	Cemetery Road	Finalist	
The Panik	2010	Gregg Hurwitz	Trust No One	Finalist	
The Panik	2010	Stephen Jay Schwartz	Boulevard	Finalist	
Hillerman Sky Award (Note: The Hillerman Sky Award was presented to the "mystery that best captures the landscape of the Southwest")	2011	Margaret Coel	The Spider's Web	Winner	
Hillerman Sky Award	2011	Sandi Ault	Wild Penance	Finalist	
Hillerman Sky Award	2011	Christine Barber	The Bone Fire	Finalist	
Hillerman Sky Award	2011	Deborah J Ledford	Snare	Finalist	
Watson Award (Note: The Watson Award was presented to the "mystery novel with best sidekick")	2011	Craig Johnson	Junkyard Dogs	Winner	
Watson Award	2011	Sandi Ault	Wild Penance	Finalist	
Watson Award	2011	Rachel Brady	Dead Lift	Finalist	
Watson Award	2011	Chris Grabenstein	Rolling Thunder	Finalist	
Watson Award	2011	Spencer Quinn	To Fetch a Thief	Finalist	
Golden Nugget Award (Note: The Golden Nugget Award was presented to the "best mystery set in California")	2012	Kelli Stanley	City of Secrets	Winner	
Golden Nugget Award	2012	Jan Burke	Disturbance	Finalist	
Golden Nugget Award	2012	Michael Connelly	The Drop	Finalist	
Golden Nugget Award	2012	Janet Dawson	Bit Player	Finalist	
Golden Nugget Award	2012	Sue Grafton	V Is for Vengeance	Finalist	
Rocky Award (Note: The Rocky Award was presented to the "best mystery set in the LCC region")	2013	Craig Johnson	As the Crow Flies	Winner	
Rocky Award	2013	Margaret Coel	Buffalo Bill's Dead Now	Finalist	
Rocky Award	2013	Chuck Greaves	Hush Money	Finalist	
Rocky Award	2013	Beth Groundwater	Wicked Eddies	Finalist	
Rocky Award	2013	Darrell James	Sonora Crossing	Finalist	
Watson Award (Note: The Watson Award was presented to the "mystery novel with best sidekick")	2013	Rochelle Staab	Bruja Brouhaha	Winner	
Watson Award	2013	Juliet Blackwell	In a Witch's Wardrobe	Finalist	
Watson Award	2013	Robert Crais	Taken	Finalist	
Watson Award	2013	Chris Grabenstein	Fun House	Finalist	
Watson Award	2013	L.C. Hayden	When the Past Haunts You	Finalist	
The Calamari (Note: The Calamari Award was presented to the "best mystery set anywhere else in the world")	2014	Louise Penny	How the Light Gets In	Winner	
The Calamari	2014	Cara Black	Murder Below Montparnasse	Finalist	
The Calamari	2014	Lisa Brackmann	Hour of the Rat	Finalist	
The Calamari	2014	Catriona McPherson	As She Left It	Finalist	
The Calamari	2014	Jeffrey Siger	Mykonos After Midnight	Finalist	
The Squid (Note: The Squid Award was presented to the "best mystery set within the United States")	2014	William Kent Krueger	Ordinary Grace	Winner	
The Squid	2014	Sue Grafton	W Is for Wasted	Finalist	
The Squid	2014	Darrell James	Purgatory Key	Finalist	
The Squid	2014	Hank Phillippi Ryan	The Wrong Girl	Finalist	
The Squid	2014	Terry Shames	The Killing at Cotton Hill	Finalist	
The Rose (Note: The Rose Award was presented to the "best mystery set in the LCC region")	2015	Gigi Pandian	Pirate Vishnu	Winner	
The Rose	2015	Chelsea Cain	One Kick	Finalist	
The Rose	2015	Terri Nolan	Glass Houses	Finalist	
The Rose	2015	L.J. Sellers	Deadly Bonds	Finalist	
The Rose	2015	Johnny Shaw	Plaster City	Finalist	
Best LCC Regional Mystery (Note: The Best LCC Regional Mystery Award was presented to the "best mystery set in the LCC region")	2016	Gigi Pandian	The Accidental Alchemist	Winner	
Best LCC Regional Mystery	2016	Michael Connelly	The Crossing	Finalist	
Best LCC Regional Mystery	2016	Matt Coyle	Night Tremors	Finalist	
Best LCC Regional Mystery	2016	Robert Crais	The Promise	Finalist	
Best LCC Regional Mystery	2016	Josh Stallings	Young Americans	Finalist	
Best World Mystery (Note: The Best World Mystery Award was presented to a novel "set anywhere outside the LCC region")	2016	Louise Penny	The Nature of the Beast	Winner	
Best World Mystery	2016	Lou Berney	The Long and Faraway Gone	Finalist	
Best World Mystery	2016	Lisa Brackmann	Dragon Day	Finalist	
Best World Mystery	2016	Chris Holm	The Killing Kind	Finalist	
Best World Mystery	2016	James W. Ziskin	Stone Cold Dead	Finalist	
