= Jake Ransom and the Skull King's Shadow =

2009 novel by James Rollins

Jake Ransom
- HarperCollins edition, 2009
- Author: James Rollins
- Language: English
- Series: Jake Ransom
- Genre: Thriller fantasy novel
- Publisher: HarperCollins
- Publication date: 28 April 2009
- Publication place: United States
- Media type: Print (hardcover)
- Pages: 399
- ISBN: 978-0-06-147379-1
- Followed by: Jake Ransom and the Howling Sphinx

Jake Ransom and the Skull King's Shadow is a young adult novel by James Rollins, part of the Jake Ransom fantasy adventure series.

== Plot synopsis ==
When a mysterious envelope arrives for Jake Ransom, he and his older sister, Kady, are plunged into a gripping chain of events. An artifact found by their parents (on the expedition from which they never returned) leads Jake and Kady to a strange world inhabited by a peculiar mix of long-lost civilizations such as the Romans, Mayans, and the Dinosaurs, a world that may hold the key to their parents disappearance.

As they enter the gate to this strange place, savage creatures soar across the sky, diving to attack. Jake's new friends, the Mayan girl Marika and the Roman Pindor, say the creatures were created by an evil alchemist - the Skull King, Kalverum Rex. as Jake struggles to find a way home, it becomes obvious that what the Skull King wants most is Jake and Kady - dead or alive. Will Jake stay and help his friends or will he turn his back on his new friends?

== Characters ==
- Jake Ransom
- Kady Ransom
- Marika Balam
- Pindor Tiberius
- Bach'uuk
- Henry Bethel
- Huntress Livia
- Kalverum Rex a.k.a. The Skull King
- Centurion Gaius
- Magister Balam
- Magister Oswin
- Magister Zahur
- Morgan Drummond
- Heronidus Tiberius
- Marcus Tiberius
- Astrid Ulfsdottir
- Elder Wu
- Mer'uuk
- Jake and Kady's parents
- Museum Curator
- Randy White
- Craig Brask
- John Harry

== Reception ==
According to Kirkus Reviews, Rollin's debut novel for children "starts out as a realistic thriller but takes a big left turn into fantasy without abandoning the thrills. Dollops of real science are nicely integrated, but the characterizations harbor no surprises."

Publishers Weekly also highlighted the inclusion of non-fiction material, noting that novel "presents a wide range of interesting historical information while telling a rollicking good story". They also referred to the novel an "exciting time-travel adventure" and Jake "an Indiana Jones in the making".

Booklist's Ilene Cooper compared the plot, as well as the main character Jake, to Harry Potter, but noted that "stylistically, [...] Rollins is no Rowling, though his short paragraphs and staccato sentences make this a fine read for the reluctant or those who put a premium on action." Cooper added, "Oddly, things get a bit more ho-hum as they become more fantastical."
