= Convivium =

Convivium may refer to:

- Symposium
- Convivium, a magazine published by Cardus
- Convivium, a short story by Kelli Stanley
