= Kelli Stanley =

American author of mystery-thrillers (born 1964)

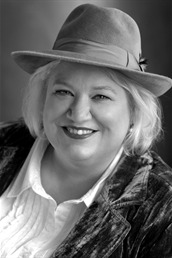
Photo of Kelli Stanley (Lisa Keating Photography)

Kelli Stanley (born 1964) is an American author of mystery-thrillers. The majority of her published fiction is written in the genres of historical crime fiction and noir. Her best known work, the Miranda Corbie series, is set in San Francisco, her adoptive hometown.

== Biography ==
=== Novels ===
Stanley's debut novel, Nox Dormienda (A Long Night for Sleeping) (released in 2008) was the first of a series set in Roman Britain in the 1st century CE (The Arcturus Series). Nox Dormienda takes its title from a line by the Roman poet Catullus in the poem known as Catullus 5 (Vivamus, mea Lesbia ...). Stanley has said that the title is an homage to The Big Sleep, and roughly translates as "A night that must be slept, i.e., death." Stanley was a graduate student in Classics at San Francisco State University when she wrote the novel, and labeled this first series as "Roman noir," a pun on the French literary term for “black novel,” a unique combination of historical setting and hardboiled style. The Curse-Maker, the second novel in the series, was sold to Thomas Dunne/St. Martin's Minotaur and published in 2011.

Stanley's second novel, City of Dragons, was published by Thomas Dunne/St. Martin's Minotaur in 2010. The novel marked Stanley's move from a small press to a major publisher. The first novel in the Miranda Corbie mystery series, City of Dragons is set in 1940 San Francisco, particularly Chinatown, and tackles issues relating to the Second Sino-Japanese War. The protagonist, Miranda Corbie, is a private investigator, former Spanish Civil War nurse and ex-escort. Stanley has said that she wanted to create a femme fatale as a hero, playing tribute to noir conventions while at the same time challenging them.

City of Secrets, the sequel to City of Dragons, was published in 2011. The plot centers on the murders of two young women, the crime apparently motivated by anti-Semitism. The novel continues to explore the major themes of Stanley's oeuvre: racism, sexism, and the erroneous romanticism of history.

City of Ghosts, the third novel in the Miranda Corbie series, was published in August 2014. In addition to genre elements and an ongoing authorial redefinition of noir, the plot explores the role of art in culture, specifically centering on how Nazi Germany labeled most modern art "degenerate" while simultaneously looting Old Masters and other works from conquered European countries.

City of Sharks, the fourth book in the Miranda Corbie series, was published in 2018. This books has been the final Miranda Corbie novel to date, though the plot, which features Alcatraz as the titular "city of sharks", points to a continuation of the series in England.

In 2016, Stanley founded a non-profit publisher called Nasty Woman Press. As the "Creative Resistance", it published the anthology Shattering Glass: A Nasty Woman Press Anthology in 2020, which went on to win the prestigious Anthony Award. The anthology itself comprised both fiction and non-fiction from a variety of bestselling and noteworthy authors, including editor Heather Graham, and included an introduction by Valerie Plame and an interview with Senator Barbara Boxer. Stanley, Plame and Boxer were interviewed by Alyssa Milano on her podcast "Sorry, Not Sorry."

The mystery-thriller The Reckoning, Stanley's exploration of crime, survivor's guilt, violence against women and PTSD, set within the illegal economy of northern California's cannibis crop in 1985's Humboldt County, will be published on January 6th, 2026, by Severn House. An e-book is releasing from Tantor Audio. Stanley spent her adolescent years in Humboldt, and has described her own experiences as partial inspiration for the book. It is the first of a series featuring Renata Drake, a young woman on the run for executing her sister's murderer.

=== Short stories ===
Stanley's first published short-story, "Convivium", is a prequel to Nox Dormienda and was published in the now-defunct e-magazine "Hardluck Stories", founded by author Dave Zeltserman. "Convivium" was nominated for a Spinetinger Award for best e-story in 2007.

"Children's Day", a short story prequel to City of Dragons featuring Miranda Corbie, Stanley's private detective protagonist, was published in the bestselling International Thriller Writers anthology First Thrills: High-Octane Stories from the Hottest Thriller Authors. The collection, which was edited by Lee Child, was released in 2010 by Tor/Forge.

"Memory Book", another Miranda Corbie short story prequel to both City of Dragons and City of Secrets, was published September 6, 2011, on Macmillan's The Criminal Element website and as an e-book.

Stanley also participated in the first charity e-book anthology, spearheaded by author Timothy Hallinan. The project, which resulted in the bestselling e-book Shaken: Stories for Japan, contributes all money—including the share normally retained by Amazon—to the Japan America Society of Southern California, to be used to help the country recover from the devastating effects of the Great East Japan earthquake. Stanley's contribution is set during the 1906 San Francisco earthquake, and is entitled "Coolie".

Stanley's first contemporary fiction, a short story about the 2008 financial meltdown entitled "Survivor", is available in the "Scoundrels" anthology in both print and e-book formats. The anthology is edited by noir author Gary Philips.

In 2016, Stanley contributed a story named "Hysterical" to Shattering Glass. In 2019, San Francisco Magazine decided to publish fiction for the first time, and invited Stanley to contribute a Miranda Corbie short story, which was published as "A Night on the Town" in February, 2019. The story was a prequel to her earlier novels and short stories.

Stanley penned two stories as contributions to two Bouchercon anthologies: "Folk Song", which was published in Tales of Music, Murder, and Mayhem: Bouchercon Anthology 2024, which, edited by Heather Graham, went on to win the Anthony Award, and "Levees", published in Blood on the Bayou: Case Closed: Bouchercon Anthology 2025. Both stories are historical, with "Folk Song" originating from a song Stanley's Kentucky-born father used to sing to her.

=== Critical reception ===
The city and county of San Francisco awarded Stanley a Certificate of Honor for her invention of the "Roman noir" subgenre, and Nox Dormienda went on to win the Bruce Alexander Memorial Historical Mystery Award for best historical mystery published in 2008, despite its limited print run as a small-press book.

City of Dragons received early praise from several notable writers, including Lee Child, Linda Fairstein, Robert B. Parker, George Pelecanos and Otto Penzler, and was published to high critical acclaim: three starred reviews from Publishers Weekly, Booklist, and Library Journal, an RT Book Review Top Pick, an Indie Next Pick from the American Booksellers Association, and a Killer Book from the Independent Mystery Booksellers Association.

Crime fiction critic Tom Nolan of the San Francisco Chronicle wrote in a review dated March 28, 2010, that "Stanley, winner (for a previous book set in ancient Rome) of the Bruce Alexander Award for best historical mystery, knows how to bring the past to life: not only with a wealth of references to old buildings and politics and popular culture, but with thoughts and attitudes, dialogue and gestures, that seem both true to another time and as spontaneous as right this minute. City of Dragons, with its brittle patter and its broken heart of gold, is a joy to read.”.

Oline Cogdill of the South Florida Sun-Sentinel praised on February 21, 2010: "Kelli Stanley's riveting new series about 1940s San Francisco private investigator Miranda Corbie revels in the character's uniqueness without resorting to cliches ... The gritty, hard-boiled City of Dragons works as an insightful look at racism and sexism. Stanley never misses a beat as she also shows San Francisco's hidden corners, seething emotions in the days before WWII. ... City of Dragons is a wonderful start to what should be a long-running series."

The hardcover edition of City of Dragons reached No. 2 on the bestseller list for the Independent Mystery Booksellers Association and was published in hardcover, paperback, large-print, audio and e-editions.

The novel won the Macavity Award (Sue Feder Memorial Historical Mystery Award) for 2010, a major mystery award given out by Mystery Readers International. City of Dragons was also selected as a finalist for the Los Angeles Times Book Prize in the mystery/thriller category, was nominated for the Bruce Alexander Memorial Historical Mystery Award, the RT Book Reviews Reviewer's Choice award in the historical mystery category, and was a finalist for the Shamus Award for Best First PI Novel by the Private Eye Writers of America.

City of Secrets, the sequel to City of Dragons won the Golden Nugget Award at Left Coast Crime 2012, in Sacramento, California, on March 31, 2012, for the best California-set mystery of 2011. The book was also nominated for a RT Book Reviews Reviewers Choice Award.

=== Non-fiction ===
Stanley contributed an essay and writing exercise to "Now Write! Mysteries", part of the successful writing instruction series published by Penguin.

She also contributed an article to "Books to Die For", a selection of essays by 120 mystery writers world-wide on the subject of their favorite or most influential books in the genre. "Books to Die For" is edited by John Connolly and Declan Burke, and is published in the UK by Hodder and Stoughton and in the US by Washington Square Press.

=== Academic ===
As a graduate student, Stanley published an article on the sociological and cultural impact of Wonder Woman, the DC Comics superhero. The paper is entitled “’Suffering Sappho!’: Wonder Woman and the (Re)Invention of the Feminine Ideal.” Helios 32.2 (2005): 143–171.

=== Personal life ===
Stanley is a member of Phi Beta Kappa, holds a master's degree in Classics from San Francisco State University, is published in that field, and has lectured internationally at academic conferences. She lived and attended high school in northern Mendocino/southern Humboldt counties in northern California.

Stanley served as President of the Northern California Mystery Writers of America for two years. Stanley is also a member of the International Thriller Writers, Sisters in Crime, the Authors Guild, and the Crime Writers' Association, and credits Raymond Chandler as her greatest writing influence.

== Awards and honors ==
Stanley was named "Historical Mystery Guest of Honor" at the Bouchercon World Mystery Convention (Bouchercon 55) in 2024, held in Nashville, Tennessee.

City of Secrets won the Golden Nugget Award for best California-set mystery of 2011 and was a finalist for the RT Book Reviews Reviewers Choice Award (Historical Mystery).

City of Dragons won the Macavity Award (Sue Feder Memorial Historical Mystery Award) for best historical mystery of 2010.

City of Dragons was selected as one of the five finalists for the Los Angeles Times Book Prize, the Shamus Award, for Best First Private Eye Novel, the Bruce Alexander Memorial Historical Mystery Award for Best Historical Mystery of 2010, awarded at Left Coast Crime in March, 2011, and the RT Book Reviews Readers Choice award for Best Historical Mystery of 2010.

Nox Dormienda won the Bruce Alexander Memorial Historical Mystery Award for Best Historical Mystery of 2008, awarded at the mystery conference Left Coast Crime in March, 2009. Nox Dormienda was also nominated for a 2009 Macavity Award (the Sue Feder Memorial Historical Mystery Award). The Macavity is awarded annually by the members of Mystery Readers International.

Nox Dormienda was a Writer's Digest Notable Debut (July/August, 2008), and Stanley was awarded a Certificate of Honor from the City and County of San Francisco for her creation of the "Roman noir".

Stanley's short story "Convivium", a prequel to Nox Dormienda, was published in the webzine Hardluck Stories in 2007, and was nominated for a Spinetinger Award that same year.

== Selected works ==
The Renata Drake Series

- The Reckoning, Severn House, Hardcover, Trade Paperback, E-Book, Audio

The Miranda Corbie Series

- City of Dragons, Thomas Dunne/St. Martin's Minotaur, Hardcover, Trade Paperback, Large Print, E-Book
- City of Dragons, Tantor Media, Narrated by Cynthia Holloway, Audio Book
- "Children's Day" (short story) included in First Thrills: High-Octane Stories from the Hottest Thriller Authors, Hardcover, Mass-Market Paperback, E-book, Audio Book
- "Memory Book" (novella), St. Martin's Minotaur, E-book
- City of Secrets, Thomas Dunne/St. Martin's Minotaur, Hardcover, Large Print, E-book
- City of Ghosts, St. Martin's Minotaur, Hardcover, Large Print, E-book
- City of Sharks, St. Martin's Minotaur, Hardcover

The Roman Noir Series

- Nox Dormienda (A Long Night for Sleeping), Five Star Mysteries (Gale Group), July, 2008, Hardcover, Large Print, E-book
- The Curse-Maker, Thomas Dunne/St. Martin's Minotaur, February 2011, Hardcover, E-book
- "Convivium" (short story), republished in e-book anthology Left Hanging: 9 Tales of Suspense and Thrills

Non-Series Fiction

- "Coolie" (short story), published in e-book anthology Shaken: Stories for Japan
- "Survivor" (short story), published in anthology Scoundrels: Tales of Greed, Murder and Financial Crime, Trade Paperback, E-book
- "Hysterical" (short story), published in anthology Shattering Glass: A Nasty Woman Press Anthology, Trade Paperback, E-book
- "A Night on the Town" (short story), published in periodical "San Francisco Magazine" (February 2019)
- "Folk Song" (short story), published in anthology Tales of Music, Murder, and Mayhem: Bouchercon Anthology 2024, Trade Paperback, E-book
- "Levees" (short story), published in anthology Blood on the Bayou: Case Closed: Bouchercon Anthology 2025, Trade Paperback, E-book

Non-fiction

- "She Can Bring Home the Bacon" (essay and writing exercise), published in Now Write! Mysteries, Trade Paperback, E-book
- Contributor, Books to Die For, hardcover, ebook
