= Gigi Pandian =

American writer

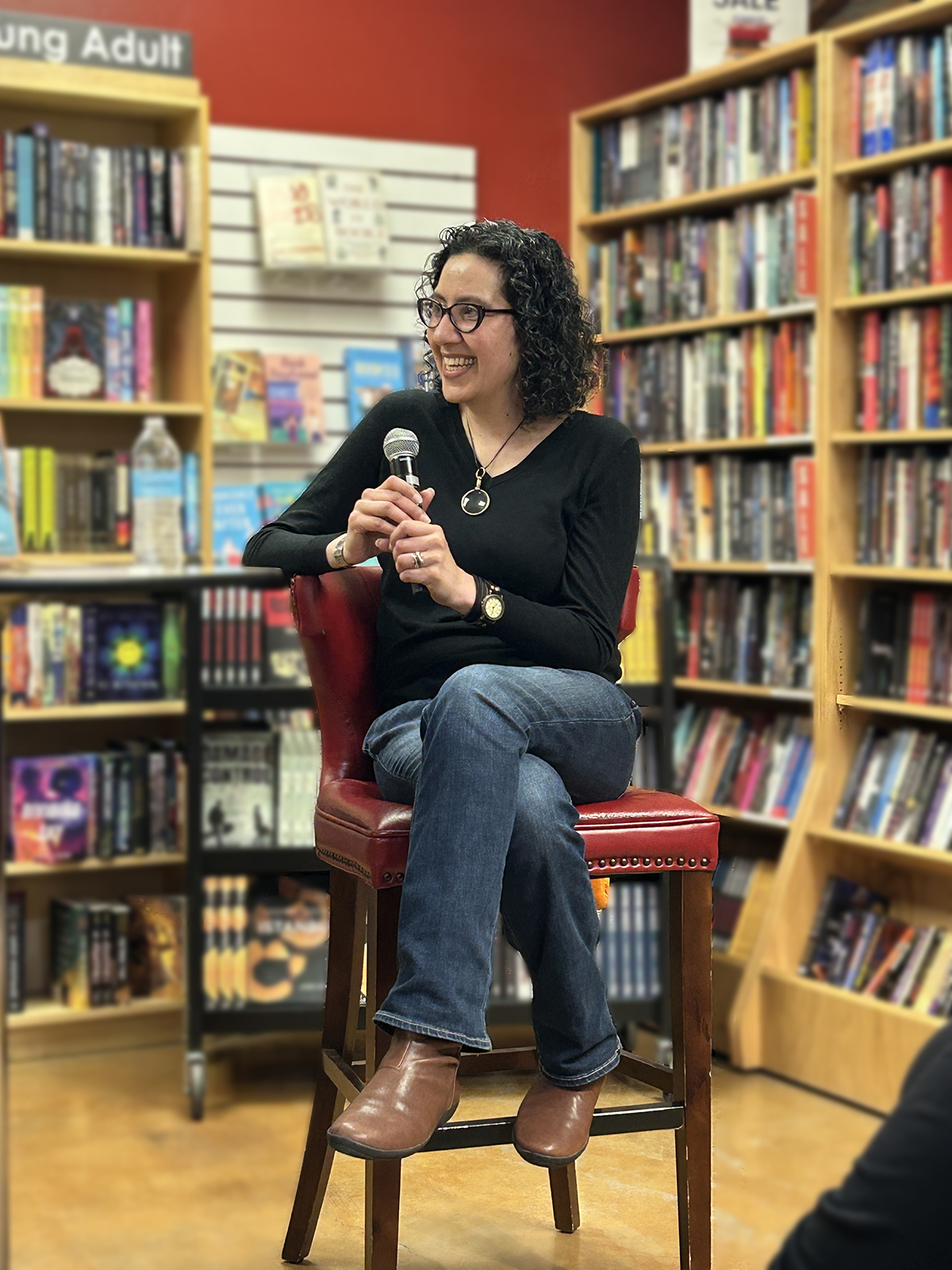
- Gigi Pandian, 2025
- Born: 1975 (age 50–51)
- Occupation: Author
- Writing career
- Genres: Mystery; Cozy mystery; Locked-room mystery
- Website: gigipandian.com

Gigi Pandian (born 1975) is an American writer. She is best known for writing cozy mystery fiction that features puzzle plots, world travel, history, adventure, magic, and romance. Pandian is a member of Sisters in Crime and Mystery Writers of America. In 2018, she co-founded Crime Writers of Color with Kellye Garrett and Walter Mosley.

== Biography ==
Pandian was born in 1975 and was raised in Southern California. She grew up in a multicultural family (her father is from India and her mother is from New Mexico) and she spent her childhood traveling the world with her parents, who are both cultural anthropologists. Pandian holds an undergraduate degree from Pitzer College and a master's degree from the University of Washington. She also studied abroad at the University of Edinburgh and the University of Bath. Pandian never completed her Ph.D., however, realizing that she would rather write about the adventures of fictional academics than be one herself. In 2011, Pandian was diagnosed with breast cancer and immersed herself in her writing in order to get through her treatments and recovery. Pandian lives in the San Francisco Bay Area of California.

== Career ==
Pandian is an aficionado of locked-room mysteries and has cited Golden Age mystery authors John Dickson Carr and Clayton Rawson as inspirations; she has also been influenced by the work of Elizabeth Peters. Many of Pandian's novels and stories feature elements of the "impossible crime" mystery. Her fiction has won two Agatha Awards, two Lefty Awards, one Anthony Award, and one Derringer Award. Her debut novel, Artifact, was awarded the William F. Deeck Malice Domestic Grant.

=== Novels ===
Pandian writes novels in three series: the Jaya Jones Treasure Hunt Mysteries, the Accidental Alchemist Mysteries, and the Secret Staircase Mysteries.

=== Short fiction ===
Pandian also writes prize-winning short stories, some of which feature characters from her novel series and many that feature locked-room puzzles. Her story "The Hindi Houdini" was nominated for Agatha and Macavity awards, "The Locked Room Library" was a finalist for nearly every major mystery short story award in 2021 and 2022, "The Library Ghost of Tanglewood Inn" won the Agatha Award for Best Short Story in 2017, and "The Cambodian Curse," a Jaya Jones story, won the Derringer Award from The Short Mystery Fiction Society in 2019.

== Awards and honors ==
Awards for Pandian's Writing
Year	Title	Award	Category	Result	Ref
2007	Artifact	William F. Deeck-Malice Domestic Grant	—	Won	
2013	"The Hindi Houdini"	Agatha Award	Best Short Story	Shortlisted	
2014	"The Hindi Houdini"	Macavity Award	Best Short Story	Shortlisted	
2015	Pirate Vishnu	Lefty Award	The Rose	Won	
2016	The Accidental Alchemist	Lefty Award	Best Regional Mystery	Won	
2017	Michelangelo's Ghost	Lefty Award	Best Mystery Novel	Shortlisted	
2017	"The Library Ghost of Tanglewood Inn"	Agatha Award	Best Short Story	Won	
2019	"The Cambodian Curse"	Derringer Award	Best Novelette	Won	
2019	"The Cambodian Curse"	Macavity Award	Best Mystery Short Story	Shortlisted	
2020	The Alchemist's Illusion	Anthony Award	Best Paperback Original	Won	
2020	The Alchemist's Illusion	Edgar Award	G.P. Putnam's Sons Sue Grafton Memorial Award	Shortlisted	
2021	"The Locked Room Library"	Agatha Award	Best Short Story	Shortlisted	
2022	"The Locked Room Library"	Edgar Award	Best Short Story	Shortlisted	
2022	"The Locked Room Library"	Macavity Award	Best Mystery Short Story	Shortlisted	
2022	"The Locked Room Library"	Anthony Award	Best Short Story	Shortlisted	
2023	The Raven Thief	Agatha Award	Best Contemporary Novel	Shortlisted	
2024	A Midnight Puzzle	Agatha Award	Best Contemporary Novel	Won	
2025	The Library Game	Lefty Award	Best Mystery Novel	Shortlisted	

== Publications ==
=== Jaya Jones Treasure Hunt Mysteries ===
- Artifact (2012)
- Pirate Vishnu (2013)
- Quicksand (2014)
- Michelangelo's Ghost (2016)
- The Ninja's Illusion (2017)
- The Cambodian Curse and Other Stories (2019) - short story collection
- The Glass Thief (2019)

=== Accidental Alchemist Mysteries ===
- The Accidental Alchemist (2015)
- The Masquerading Magician (2016)
- The Elusive Elixir (2017)
- The Alchemist's Illusion (2019)
- The Lost Gargoyle of Paris (2020) - novella
- The Alchemist of Fire and Fortune (2021)
- The Alchemist of Riddle and Ruin (2022)
- The Alchemist of Monsters and Mayhem (2023)
- The Alchemist of Brushstrokes and Brimstone (2024)
- A Gargoyle's Guide to Murder (2025)
- The Alchemist of All Hallows Eve (2026)

=== Secret Staircase Mysteries ===
- Under Lock & Skeleton Key (2022)
- The Raven Thief (2023)
- A Midnight Puzzle (2024)
- The Library Game (2025)
