= Eleanor Taylor Bland =

African-American writer

- Born: December 31, 1944; Boston, Massachusetts, U.S.
- Died: June 2, 2010 (aged 65)
- Education: University of Southern Illinois (BA)
- Spouse: Anthony Bland
- Writing career
- Genre: crime fiction

Eleanor Taylor Bland (December 31, 1944 – June 2, 2010) was an African-American writer of crime fiction. She was the creator of Lincoln Prairie, Illinois (based on Waukegan, Illinois) police detective Marti McAllister.

== Biography ==
Bland was born in Boston, Massachusetts, and married Anthony Bland, a member of the United States Navy, when she was fourteen. In the early 1970s, they relocated to the Naval Station Great Lakes in North Chicago, Illinois She and her husband remained together for 31 years before separating.

Bland received a BA from the University of Southern Illinois in 1981, and from 1981 to 1999 worked as an accountant. She had two children and several grandchildren, and resided in Waukegan, Illinois, during the later years of her life. She served on the board of the Waukegan Public Library and chaired its friends of the library group.

She was diagnosed with Gardner's syndrome in the 1970s, and was reportedly given only two years to live at the time. However, Bland lived forty more years. She died from Gardner's Syndrome on June 2, 2010, in Waukegan, Illinois.

== Works ==
Bland's first novel, Dead Time (1992), introduced her sleuth, African-American police detective Marti MacAlister, recently transferred from Chicago to the small town of Lincoln Prairie, Illinois. However, her second book, Slow Burn, was actually the first one written but no publisher wanted it.

Several novels featuring Marti MacAlister followed. Marti works in collaboration with a male partner, Polish-American Vik Jessenovik, and their contrasting styles have been described as city-reared, streetwise, spunky and intuitive and Baptist (Marti) versus meticulous and small-town-minded Catholic (Vik).

Family and community life, and social issues, are also strong elements in the novels.

In a survey of women detectives in crime fiction, Maureen Reddy points out that almost all African American women writers create detectives who have children and a family life. Bland herself once commented that "the most significant contribution that we have made, collectively, to mystery fiction is the development of the extended family; the permanence of spouses and significant others, most of whom don't die in the first three chapters; children who are complex, wanted and loved; and even pets."

== Books ==
- Dead Time (1992)
- Slow Burn (1993)
- Gone Quiet (1994)
- Done Wrong (1995) ISBN 9780312957940, OCLC 34698212
- Keep Still (1996)
- See No Evil New York : St. Martin's Press, 1998. ISBN 9780312169107, OCLC 37560267
- Tell No Tales (1999) ISBN 9780312971137, OCLC 43671747
- Scream in Silence (2000)
- Whispers in the Dark (2001)
- Windy City Dying (2002)
- Fatal Remains (2003)
- A Cold and Silent Dying (2004)
- A Dark and Deadly Deception (2005)
- Suddenly a Stranger (2007)

Editor

- Shades of Black: Crime and Mystery Stories by African American Authors (2004)

== Legacy & Awards ==
Following her death, the organization of mystery writers Sisters in Crime created the "Eleanor Taylor Bland Crime Fiction Writers of Color Award" in her honor.

The Chicago Literary Hall of Fame has announced her as a 2026 inductee, citing among other things her presidency of Sisters in Crime and her mentoring of mystery writers Libby Fischer Hellman and Michael Dymmoch.

== See also ==
- Police Procedural
- Crime fiction
- Mystery (fiction)
- Detective
- List of female detective/mystery writers
- List of female detective characters
