= Sarah Shankman =

American mystery writer

Sarah Shankman is an American writer of mystery novels. She has written books under the name Alice Storey. She may be best known for the Samantha Adams mystery series.

== Biography ==
Shankman was born in Louisiana. She attended Emory University. She taught at Georgia State College and at a high school in Milpitas, CA. She worked at Alfred magazine and in publishing in New York City.

Her first novel was published in 1986 and her most recent book was published in 2014. Most of her novels take place in the American South and specifically in Georgia, Louisiana, and Mississippi. She is a member of the International Association of Crime Writers, Mystery Writers of America, PEN, and Sisters in Crime.

== Selected works ==
- Impersonal Attractions. Simon & Schuster, 1986.
- Keeping Secrets. Simon & Schuster, 1988.
- I Still Miss My Man but My Aim Is Getting Better. Pocket Books, 1996.
- (Editor) A Confederacy of Crime: New Stories of Southern-Style Mystery. Signet, 2001.
- Say You're Sorry: 12 Stories of Bad Behavior and Criminal Consequences. Untreed Reads Publishing, 2014.

=== Samantha Adams series ===
1. (Under pseudonym Alice Story) First Kill All the Lawyers. Pocket Books, 1988.
2. (Under pseudonym Alice Story) Then Hang All the Liars. Pocket Books, 1988.
3. Now Let's Talk of Graves. Pocket Books, 1990.
4. She Walks in Beauty. Pocket Books. 1992.
5. The King Is Dead. Pocket Books. 1992.
6. He Was Her Man. Pocket Books. 1993.
7. Digging up Momma. Pocket Books, 1998.
