= Rebecca Cantrell =

American novelist

Rebecca Cantrell is a New York Times and USA Today bestselling author. She has published nine novels in over ten different languages. Her novels have won the ITW Thriller, the Macavity, and the Bruce Alexander awards. They have been nominated for the GoodReads Choice award, the Barry, the RT Reviewers Choice, and the APPY award. She and her husband and son live in Berlin.

== Works ==
Cantrell is the author of the series of novels featuring Hannah Vogel, a crime reporter in 1930s Berlin. The first novel in the series, A Trace of Smoke, won the 2010 Sue Feder Historical Mystery Macavity Award and the 2010 Bruce Alexander Memorial Historical Mystery Award. The fourth novel in the series, A City of Broken Glass, was nominated for the 2013 Mary Higgins Clark Award and the 2013 Sue Feder Historical Mystery Macavity Award.

Cantrell collaborated with novelist James Rollins to write the Order of the Sanguines trilogy. The first novel in the series, The Blood Gospel, was a New York Times best seller.

Cantrell is also the author of a series of novels featuring Joe Tesla, an agoraphobic millionaire who is confined to Grand Central Terminal and the tunnels under New York City. The first novel in the series, The World Beneath, won the 2014 Best Ebook Original award from International Thriller Writers.

== Books ==
=== Malibu Mystery (with Sean Black) ===
1. "A" is for Actress or "A" is for Asshat (December 5, 2015 by Sean Black Digital)
2. "B" is for Bad Girls (December 1, 2015 by Createspace Independent Publishing Platform)
3. "C" is for Coochy Coo (July 27, 2016 by Createspace Independent Publishing Platform)
4. "D" is for Drunk (July 27, 2016 by Createspace Independent Publishing Platform)
5. "E" is for Exposed (December 22, 2017 by Createspace Independent Publishing Platform)
6. "F" is for Fred (June 27, 2019 by Independently Published)
7. "G" is for Groovy (January 30, 2020 Kindle Edition)

=== Hannah Vogel Series ===
1. A Trace of Smoke (Forge Books, 2009)
2. A Night of Long Knives (Forge Books, 2010)
3. A Game of Lies (Forge Books, 2011)
4. A City of Broken Glass (Forge Books, 2012)

=== The Order of the Sanguines Trilogy (with James Rollins) ===
- 0.5: "City of Screams" (short story ebook; William Morrow, 2012)
- 1.0: The Blood Gospel (William Morrow, 2013)
- 1.5: "Blood Brothers" (short story ebook; William Morrow, 2013)
- 2.0: Innocent Blood (William Morrow, 2013)
- 3.0: Blood Infernal (William Morrow, 2015)

=== Joe Tesla Series ===
- The World Beneath: A Joe Tesla Novel. Self-published. 2013. Winner of the International Thriller Writers award
- The Tesla Legacy (self, February 2015)
- The Chemistry of Death (self, August 2015)
- The Steel Shark (self, July 2017)

=== Short story ===
- Cantrell, Rebecca (2010). Child, Lee (ed.). "On the Train". First Thrills: High-Octane Stories from the Hottest Thriller Authors. Forge Books.
