= Jerrilyn Farmer =

American novelist

- Born: Lincolnwood, Illinois, U.S.
- Citizenship: United States
- Education: Northern Illinois University
- Writing career
- Genres: Fiction, Cozy mystery, Mystery
- Website: www.jerrilynfarmer.com

Jerrilyn Farmer is an American mystery fiction writer, author of a series of humorous 'cozy' mysteries featuring Hollywood caterer 'Madeline Bean'.

Originally from Illinois, Jerrilyn Farmer majored in Acting and English at Northern Illinois University, and moved to Los Angeles to pursue an acting career. However she found a career writing for television, mainly for game shows and sketch comedy. Her first novel Sympathy for the Devil (1998) was nominated for an Agatha award and an Edgar award and won the Macavity Award. Her second was nominated for an Agatha award and a Lefty award. She has also taught mystery writing at the UCLA Extension's Writers Program.

== Books ==
Madeline Bean Series:

- Sympathy for the Devil (1998)
- Immaculate Reception (1999)
- Killer Wedding (2000)
- Dim Sum Dead (2001)
- Mumbo Gumbo (2003)
- Perfect Sax (2004)
- The Flaming Luau of Death (2005)
- Desperately Seeking Sushi (2006) - Never released

Other:

- (with Joan Rivers) Murder at the Academy Awards (2009)

== See also ==
- Mystery (fiction)
- List of female detective/mystery writers
- List of female detective characters
