= Jeri Westerson =

American novelist (born 1960)

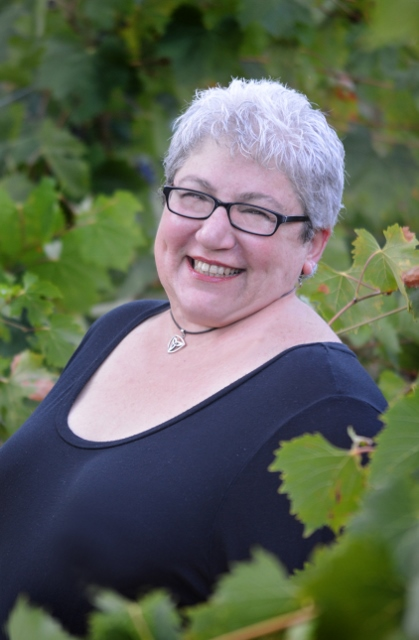
- Westerson in 2015
- Born: 1960 (age 65–66); Los Angeles, California, U.S.
- Occupation: Novelist
- Writing career
- Pen name: Haley Walsh
- Website: www.jeriwesterson.com

Jeri Westerson (born 1960) is an American novelist of medieval, Tudor, and Sherlockian mysteries, historical novels, and paranormal novels, along with LGBTQ mysteries under the pen name Haley Walsh.

== Career ==
Westerson, born and raised in Los Angeles, California, originally had designs on a career as an actress but changed her major in college to graphic design. After graduating, she continued as a commercial artist in the Los Angeles area for fifteen years before semi-retiring to start a family. She has lived in Hawthorne, Pasadena, and currently lives in Menifee in the Inland Empire. She began writing seriously for publication two years after giving birth to her son.

Westerson was a newspaper reporter for eight years, writing as a stringer for two local daily and several weekly papers to hone her skills. After that, she had several part-time jobs while continuing to write historical novels, including tasting host and tour guide for a local winery, choir director and soloist for a church, theology teacher, and secretary.

Westerson sold her first medieval mystery novel, Veil of Lies, in 2007 to St. Martin’s Minotaur. Her debut medieval mystery with protagonists Crispin Guest, a disgraced knight turned detective, along with his cutpurse servant Jack Tucker, received a nomination for the Macavity Award (Sue Feder Historical Mystery Award) and the Shamus Award for Best First Mystery.

The second Crispin Guest novel, Serpent In The Thorns, was released in 2009, and received nominations for the Bruce Alexander Historical Mystery Award and the Macavity Award (Sue Feder Historical Mystery Award). The third Crispin Guest novel, The Demon’s Parchment, was released in 2010 and also finaled for the Macavity Award and the Romantic Times Reviewers’ Choice Award.

In October 2011, Minotaur Books published her fourth medieval mystery entitled Troubled Bones. It received nominations for the Macavity, RT Reviewer's Choice, the Bruce Alexander Award, and the Agatha Award. In October 2012, her fifth, Blood Lance was released and was named one of the “Ten Hot Crime Novels for Colder Days” by Kirkus Reviews. Her sixth and last from Minotaur Shadow of the Alchemist, was released October 15, 2013. It was nominated for the RT Reviewers' Choice Award and was named by Suspense Magazine as one of the Best of 2013.

Westerson decided to release a prequel to the series, Cup of Blood, on her own under the label Old London Press. The book was released July 25, 2014, and was nominated for the Bruce Alexander Award and semi-finaled for the M.M. Bennetts Award for Historical Fiction.

Severn House, a UK based publisher, picked up the series beginning with The Silence of Stones—released first in the UK in November 2015 and in the US in February 2016. Her follow-up A Maiden Weeping released in the UK in April 2016 with a US release in August 2016. Next came Season of Blood, which also garnered a nomination for the Bruce Alexander Award with the next book, The Deepest Grave released in the US in August 2018. The fifteenth and final Crispin Guest book, The Deadliest Sin, was released in December 2021.

Westerson ventured into the world of the paranormal romance with Booke of the Hidden, released October 31, 2017 by Diversion Books. The series is complete in four books, with Deadly Rising, Shadows in the Mist, and concluding with The Darkest Gateway. A spin-off series from Booke of the Hidden, Moonrisers; A Werewolf Mystery released February 2020. She has also written a gaslamp fantasy trilogy, Enchanter Chronicles.

In 2010, writing as Haley Walsh, Westerson published the first in a series of LGBTQ romantic comedy mysteries featuring high school English teacher and amateur sleuth Skyler Foxe, with the book Foxe Tail, published by MLR Press. The second in the series, Foxe Hunt, was released in September 2011, and the third, Out-Foxed was released November 2012.

A follow-up novella, Foxe Den was self-published in December 2012. The next full-length Skyler Foxe mystery, Foxe Fire, was released in January 2014, and the fifth, Desert Foxe was released November 2014. Two novellas, Foxe Den 2: Summer Vacation and A Very Merry Foxemas were published in 2015. Crazy Like A Foxe, the next full-length mystery, was published in 2016, and the last of the series Stone Cold Foxe was released in 2017.

In 2011, author Tim Hallinan asked Westerson to participate in a short story e-book anthology whose entire proceeds would raise money for Japan earthquake relief. The book, called Shaken: Stories for Japan, includes nineteen other authors, such as Brett Battles and Ken Kuhlken. Westerson's historical short story “The Noodle Girl” is included in this Japanese-themed book.

In 2012, she was asked by two other editors to contribute to anthologies, the November released Murder and Mayhem in Muskego and 2015's serial anthology, Day of the Destroyers. Her gay erotic short story under the name Haley Walsh, "Marked," was included in the anthology Anything for a Dollar, edited by Todd Gregory, released October 15, 2013.

In 2021, Gary Phillips, editing the Akashic Noir series anthology South Central Noir, asked Westerson to contribute her original short story The Last Time I Died, released September 2022.

Westerson served two terms as president of the Southern California chapter of Mystery Writers of America from Jan 2013 to Dec 2014, is former Vice President of the Sisters in Crime Los Angeles chapter (Jan 2012 to Dec 2013), and has served two terms as past president of the Orange County California chapter of Sisters in Crime, and a member also of the San Diego chapter, Partners in Crime. She is also a founding member of the Los Angeles chapter of the Historical Novel Society and other professional writing organizations.

== Bibliography ==
=== The Crispin Guest Mysteries ===
- Veil of Lies (2008) Minotaur Books
- Serpent in The Thorns (2009) Minotaur Books
- The Demon’s Parchment (2010) Minotaur Books
- Troubled Bones (2011) Minotaur Books
- Blood Lance (2012) Minotaur Books
- Shadow of the Alchemist (2013) Minotaur Books
- Cup of Blood: A Prequel (2014) Old London Press
- The Silence of Stones (UK December 2015) (US February 2016), Severn House
- A Maiden Weeping (UK April 2016) (US August 2016), Severn House
- Season of Blood (2017), Severn House
- The Deepest Grave (2018), Severn House
- Traitor's Codex (2019), Severn House
- Sword of Shadows (2020), Severn House
- Spiteful Bones (2021), Severn House
- The Deadliest Sin (2021), Severn House, the last Crispin Guest novel

=== The King's Fool Mysteries ===
- Courting Dragons (2023), Severn House
- The Twilight Queen (2024), Severn House
- Rebellious Grace (2025), Severn House

=== An Irregular Detective Mystery Series (Sherlockian) ===
- The Isolated Seance (2023), Severn House
- The Mummy of Mayfair (2024), Severn House
- The Misplaced Physician (2025), Severn House

=== Oswald the Thief Medieval Caper series ===
- Oswald the Thief (2022), Old London Press

=== Historical Novels ===
- Though Heaven Fall (2014)
- Native Spirit: The Story of Saint Kateri Tekakwitha (2014), as Anne Castell
- Roses in the Tempest (2015)

=== Paranormal Novels ===
==== Booke of the Hidden Series ====
1. Booke of the Hidden (October 31, 2017). Diversion Books.
2. Deadly Rising: (October 23, 2018). Diversion Books.
3. Shadows in the Mist: (JABberwocky May 2019)
4. The Darkest Gateway (JABberwocky October 2019)

==== Enchanter Chronicles Trilogy ====
1. The Daemon Device (October 2019), Dragua Press
2. Clockwork Gypsy (October 2020) Dragua Press
3. Library of the Damned (Oct 2021), Dragua Press

==== Moonriser Werewolf Mystery Series ====
- Moonriser Werewolf Mysteries Book One Moonrisers; A Werewolf Mystery (March 2020), Dragua Press
- Baying for Blood Book Two in the Moonriser Werewolf Mystery Series (April 2021), Dragua Press

=== The Skyler Foxe Mysteries (writing as Haley Walsh) ===
- Foxe Tail (2010). MLR Press.
- Foxe Hunt (2011). MLR Press.
- Out-Foxed (2012). MLR Press.
- Foxe Den: A Skyler Foxe Holiday Short Story Collection (2012). Foxe Press.
- Foxe Fire (2014). MLR Press.
- Desert Foxe (2014). MLR Press.
- Foxe Den 2: Summer Vacation (2015). Foxe Press.
- A Very Merry Foxemas (2015). Foxe Press.
- Crazy Like a Foxe (2016). Foxe Press.
- Stone Cold Foxe (2017). Foxe Press. (Last in the series)

=== Short stories ===
- "Pax" in Kinesis Literary Magazine (1997)
- "The Tin Box" in St. Anthony Messenger Magazine (won second place in the Best Short Story Contest sponsored by the Catholic Press Association; 2003) and now on Kindle (2013)
- "Catching Elijah" in St. Anthony Messenger Magazine (2004) and now on Kindle (2013)
- "The Noodle Girl" in Shaken: Stories for Japan anthology, edited by Tim Hallinan (2011)
- "Universal Donor" in Murder and Mayhem in Muskego anthology, edited by Jon Jordan (2012)
- "Do-Over" an ebook short story (writing as Haley Walsh) (2012)
- "Marked" in Anything for a Dollar (writing as Haley Walsh), edited by Todd Gregory (2013)
- "Mesmer Maneuver" in Day of the Destroyers serial anthology, edited by Gary Phillips (2015)
- "Dark Chamber: A Crispin Guest Short Story" (2016)
- "Last Pole on the Left: A Santa Noir Short Story" (2019)
- "The Last Time I Died" in South Central Noir anthology, Akashic Noir, edited by Gary Phillips (Sept 2022)

=== Editing ===
- Ladies Night: Sisters in Crime Anthology edited by Naomi Hirahara, Kate Thornton, and Jeri Westerson (2015)
