= Yesterday's Echo =

2013 book by Matt Coyle

- First edition
- Author: Matt Coyle
- Genre: Mystery fiction, Crime
- Published: 2013
- Publisher: Oceanview Publishing
- Pages: 310
- Awards: Anthony Award for Best First Novel (2014)
- ISBN: 978-1-608-09076-1
- Website: Yesterday's Echo

Yesterday's Echo is a crime novel written by Matt Coyle and published by Oceanview Publishing on May 7, 2013. The novel won the Anthony Award for Best First Novel in 2014.

== Reception ==
Publishers Weekly called Yesterday's Echo a "promising debut," saying, "Coyle breaks no new ground, but Cahill turns out to be both tough and resourceful when forced to confront his past. Readers can hope his future will be brighter."

Year	Award	Category	Result	Ref.
2014	Anthony Award	Best First Novel	Won	
2014	San Diego Book Award	Best Mystery	Won	
2014	Ben Franklin Award	Best New Voice in Fiction	Won	
2014	Macavity Award	Macavity Award for Best First Mystery	Finalist	
