= Matt Coyle (writer) =

American author of crime fiction

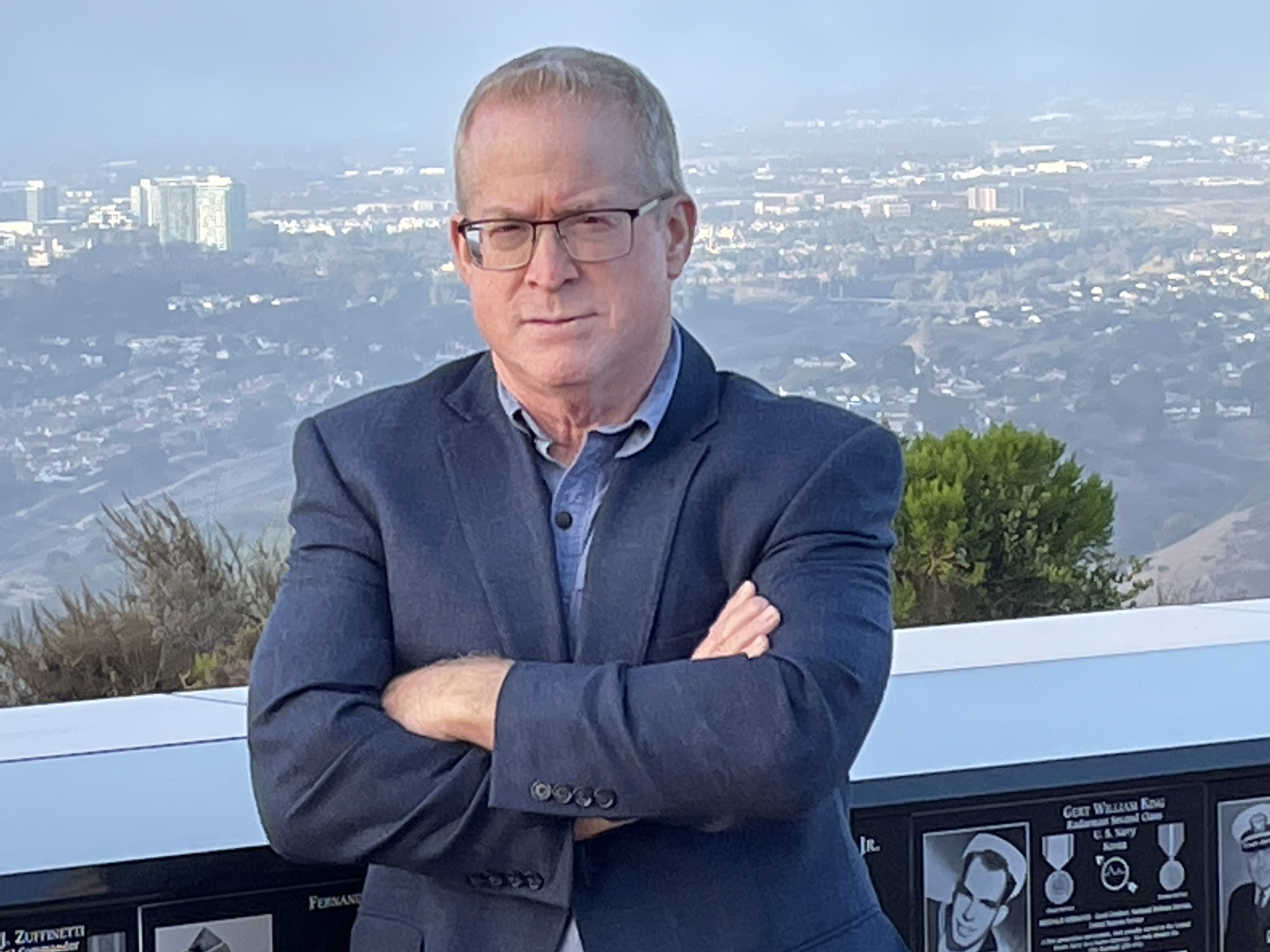
Matt Coyle in 2021

Matt Coyle is an American author of crime fiction, best known for his Rick Cahill mystery series.

== Biography ==
Coyle received a Bachelor of Arts degree in English from the University of California, Santa Barbara. He presently lives in San Diego.

== Awards ==
Awards for Coyle's writing
Year	Title	Award	Result	Ref.
2014	Yesterday’s Echo	Anthony Award for Best First Novel	Winner	
2014	Yesterday’s Echo	Ben Franklin Award for Best New Voice in Fiction	Winner	
2014	Yesterday’s Echo	Macavity Award for Best First Mystery	Finalist	
2014	Yesterday’s Echo	San Diego Book Award for Best Mystery	Winner	
2016	Night Tremors	Anthony Award for Best Paperback Original	Finalist	
2016	Night Tremors	Lefty Award for Best LCC Regional Mystery	Finalist	
2016	Night Tremors	Shamus Award for Best First PI Novel	Finalist	
2017	Blood Truth	INDIES Award for Thriller & Suspense (Adult Fiction)	Silver	
2017	Dark Fissures	Lefty Award for Best Mystery Novel	Finalist	
2017	Dark Fissures	Macavity Award for Best Mystery Novel	Finalist	
2018	Blood Truth	Lefty Award for Best Mystery Novel	Finalist	
2018	Blood Truth	Shamus Award for Best Novel	Finalist	
2018	"The #2 Pencil" in Coast to Coast	Derringer Award	Finalist	
2018	"The #2 Pencil" in Coast to Coast	Macavity Award for Best Mystery Short Story	Finalist	
2019	Wrong Light	Shamus Award for Best Novel	Finalist	
2020	Lost Tomorrows	Lefty Award for Best Mystery	Winner	
2020	Lost Tomorrows	Shamus Award for Best P. I. Hardcover Novel	Winner	
2020	Wrong Light	Lefty Award for Best Mystery Novel	Winner	
2020	Wrong Light	San Diego Book Award	Finalist	
2020	Wrong Light	Shamus Award for Best Novel	Finalist	
2021	Blind Vigil	Barry Award for Best Novel	Finalist	
2021	Blind Vigil	Lefty Award for Best Mystery Novel	Finalist	
2021	Blind Vigil	Macavity Award for Best Mystery Novel	Finalist	
2021	Blind Vigil	Shamus Award for Best P. I. Hardcover Novel	Winner	
2022	Last Redemption	Barry Award for Best Mystery/Crime Novel	Finalist	
2022	Last Redemption	Lefty Award for Best Mystery Novel	Finalist	
2022	Last Redemption	Shamus Award for Best Novel	Finalist	

== Publications ==
=== Rick Cahill series ===
1. Yesterday’s Echo (2013)
2. Night Tremors (2015)
3. Dark Fissures (2016)
4. Blood Truth (2017)
5. Wrong Light (2018)
6. Lost Tomorrows (2019)
7. Blind Vigil (2020)
8. Last Redemption (2021)
9. Doomed Legacy (2022)
10. Odyssey’s End (expected 2023)
