= James W. Ziskin =

Mystery author

- Writing career
- Subject: American crime fiction
- Notable work: Ellie Stone Series
- Notable awards: Anthony Awards, Barry Award (crime novel prize), Macavity Awards
- Website: jameswziskin.com

James W. Ziskin (born 1960) is an American crime fiction author. He has won an Anthony Award, a Barry Award, and two Macavity Awards.

== Early life and education ==
Ziskin grew up in Amsterdam, New York. He studied Romance Languages and Literature at the University of Pennsylvania.

== Career ==
Following his education, Ziskin worked as a photo-news producer and writer in New York City before becoming the director of New York University's Casa Italiana Zerilli-Marimo from 1993 to 1998.

== Awards ==
Awards for Ziskin's writing
Year	Title	Award	Result	Ref.
2015	No Stone Unturned	Anthony Award for Best Paperback Original	Finalist	
2016	Stone Cold Dead	Anthony Award for Best Paperback Original	Finalist	
2016	Stone Cold Dead	Barry Award for Best Paperback Original	Finalist	
2016	Stone Cold Dead	Lefty Award for Best World Mystery	Finalist	
2017	Heart of Stone	Anthony Award for Best Paperback Original	Winner	
2017	Heart of Stone	Edgar Allan Poe Award for Best Paperback Original	Finalist	
2017	Heart of Stone	Lefty Award for Best Mystery Novel	Finalist	
2017	Heart of Stone	Macavity Award for Best Historical Mystery	Winner	
2018	Cast the First Stone	Anthony Award for Best Paperback Original	Finalist	
2018	Cast the First Stone	Lefty Award for Best Mystery	Finalist	
2018	Cast the First Stone	Macavity Award for Best Historical Mystery	Finalist	
2019	A Stone’s Throw	Anthony Award for Best Paperback Original	Finalist	
2019	A Stone’s Throw	Dr. Tony Ryan Book Award	Finalist	
2019	A Stone’s Throw	Lefty Award for Best Mystery	Finalist	
2020	"The Twenty-Five Year Engagement"	Agatha Award for Best Short Story	Finalist	
2021	"The Twenty-Five Year Engagement"	Anthony Award for Best Short Story	Finalist	
2021	"The Twenty-Five Year Engagement"	Edgar Allan Poe Award for Best Short Story	Finalist	
2021	"The Twenty-Five Year Engagement"	Macavity Award for Best Short Story	Finalist	
2021	Turn to Stone	Barry Award for Best Paperback Original	Winner	
2021	Turn to Stone	G. P. Putnam's Sons Sue Grafton Memorial Award	Finalist	
2021	Turn to Stone	Lefty Award for Best Historical Mystery	Finalist	
2021	Turn to Stone	Sue Feder Historical Mystery Award	Winner	

== Publications ==
=== Novels ===
==== Danny Jacobs books ====
- Bombay Monsoon. Oceanview. 2022. ISBN 978-1-60809-507-0.

==== Ellie Stone books ====
- Styx & Stone. Seventh Street. 2013. ISBN 978-1-61614-819-5.
- No Stone Unturned. Seventh Street. 2014. ISBN 978-1-61614-883-6.
- Stone Cold Dead. Seventh Street. 2015. ISBN 978-1-63388-048-1.
- Heart of Stone. Seventh Street. 2016. ISBN 978-1-63388-183-9.
- Cast the First Stone. Seventh Street. 2017. ISBN 978-1-63388-281-2.
- A Stone's Throw. Seventh Street. 2018. ISBN 978-1-63388-419-9.
- Turn to Stone. Seventh Street. 2020. ISBN 978-1-63388-552-3.

=== Short stories ===
- Berry, Mysti, ed. (2018). "Who Is Stuart Bridge?". Low Down Dirty Vote. Berry Content Corporation. ISBN 978-1-946502-59-9.
- Beetner, Eric, ed. (2018). "Pan Paniscus". Unloaded 2: More Crime Writers Writing Without Guns. Down & Out Books. ISBN 978-1-946502-59-9.
- "A Bed of Roses". Strand Magazine. February–May 2019.
- Thornton, Brian, ed. (2019). "Harley Quinn Is Dead". Die Behind the Wheel: Crime Fiction Inspired by the Music of Steely Dan. Down & Out Books. ISBN 9781643960166.
- King, Laurie R., ed. (2020). "The Twenty-Five Year Engagement". League with Sherlock Holmes: Stories Inspired by the Sherlock Holmes Canon. Pegasus Crime. ISBN 9781643135830.
- Phillips, Gary, ed. (2023). "Prisoner of Love". Get Up Offa That Thing: Crime Fiction Inspired by the Songs of James Brown. Down & Out Books.
