= Cynthia Kuhn =

American writer and editor of mystery fiction

Cynthia Guerrera Kuhn (born 1965) is an American writer and editor of mystery fiction and a Professor of English at the Metropolitan State University of Denver, where she teaches Creative Writing, Film and Media studies, and Literature.

Kuhn was born and raised in Upstate New York and presently lives in Colorado.

== Awards and honors ==
Awards for Kuhn's novels
Year	Title	Award	Category	Result	Ref.
2016	The Semester of Our Discontent	Agatha Award	First Novel	Won	
2018	The Art of Vanishing	Lefty Award	Humorous Mystery Novel	Shortlisted	
2019	"The Blue Ribbon"	Agatha Award	Short Story	Shortlisted	
2019	The Spirit in Question	Lefty Award	Humorous Mystery Novel	Shortlisted	
2021	The Study of Secrets	Lefty Award	Humorous Mystery Novel	Shortlisted	
2022	How to Book a Murder	Lefty Award	Humorous Mystery Novel	Shortlisted	

== Publications ==
=== Anthologies edited ===
- Styling Texts: Dress and Fashion in Literature, edited alongside Cindy L. Carlson (2007)
- Reading Chuck Palahniuk: American Monsters and Literary Mayhem, edited alongside Lance Rubin (2009)

=== Lila Maclean Academic Mystery series ===
1. The Semester of Our Discontent (2016)
2. The Art of Vanishing (2017)
3. The Spirit in Question (2018)
4. The Subject of Malice (2019)
5. The Study of Secrets (2020)

=== Short stories ===
- "The Blue Ribbon" in Malice Domestic 14: Mystery Most Edible

=== Standalone books ===
- Self-Fashioning in Margaret Atwood's Fiction: Dress, Culture, and Identity (2005)

=== Starlit Bookshop Mystery series ===
1. How to Book a Murder (2021)
2. In the Event of Murder (2024)
3. Save the Date for Murder (expected TBD)
