= Jennifer Chow (novelist) =

American writer and novelist

Jennifer J. Chow
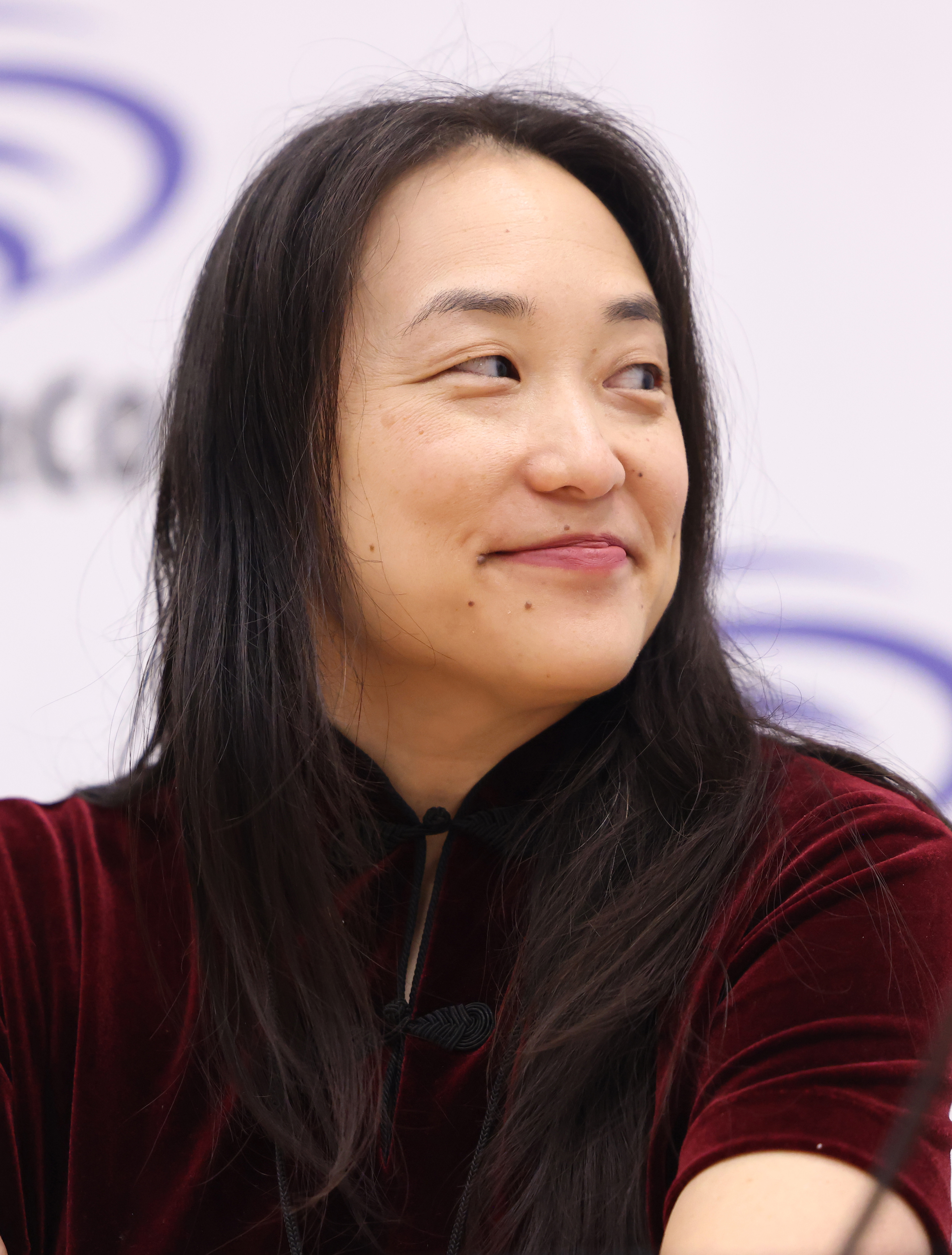
- Chow in 2025
- Education: Cornell University (BA); University of California, Los Angeles (MSW)
- Occupations: Novelist; fiction writer
- Writing career
- Pen name: J.J. Chow, Jennifer Chow
- Genres: Novel; short story; flash fiction
- Notable works: Death by Bubble Tea, Hot Pot Murder

Jennifer J. Chow is an American writer and novelist. She is an Agatha, Anthony, Lefty, and Lilian Jackson Braun Award nominated author.

Chow has also published other Asian-American novels involving secrets and mysteries. She's active in Sisters in Crime, Crime Writers of Color, and Mystery Writers of America.

== Early life and education ==
Chow was born to a Taiwanese American family. She graduated from Cornell University with a bachelor's degree in biology and sociology with a specialization in gerontology. She then earned a master's degree in social welfare from the University of California, Los Angeles. She has performed geriatric work with the elderly, which has influenced her stories. She also currently lives in Los Angeles.

== Career ==
=== Novels ===
Chow's debut novel was The 228 Legacy (2013), published by Martin Sisters Publishing, which concerns three generations of females in a Taiwanese American family living in Los Angeles during the 1980s, who each closely guard their personal secrets. The novel was an Honorable Mention in the 2015 San Francisco Book Festival, made the Second Round of the 2013 Amazon Breakthrough Novel Award, and a 2013 Finalist in the IndieFab/ForeWord Reviews' Book of the Year Award.

Chow's next novel was a mystery entitled Seniors Sleuth (2015), published by the CreateSpace Independent Publishing Platform, the first installment in her "Winston Wong Cozy Mystery" series. The book is about a former video game tester named Winston Wong, who attempts to solve a crime that takes place in his senior home, being inspired by Encyclopedia Brown. The novel was a 2015 CLUE Award Finalist, and a 2015 Runner-Up for the Beach Book Festival. Chow also wrote the book under the pseudonym "J.J. Chow." The other two books in the Winston Wong Cozy Mystery series are Robot Revenge (2018) and Wedding Woes (2019).

The third novel from Chow is a young adult novel entitled Dragonfly Dreams (2015), published by Booktrope Editions. It is a supernatural story centering around a young 17-year-old female protagonist named Topaz Woo.

Chow returned to writing cozy mysteries and published the Lefty Award-nominated Sassy Cat Mysteries with Berkley/Penguin Random House: Mimi Lee Gets a Clue (2020), Mimi Lee Reads Between the Lines (2020), and Mimi Lee Cracks the Code (2021).

She wrote the Agatha, Anthony, Lefty & Lilian Jackson Braun Award-Nominated L.A. Night Market Mysteries (Berkley/Penguin Random House): Death by Bubble Tea (2022) and Hot Pot Murder (2023). She also writes the Magical Fortune Cookie (Minotaur/St. Martin's Press) series: Ill-Fated Fortune (2024).

=== Short fiction ===
Chow has published "The Fall of the Tech Titan" in Malice Domestic: Mystery Most Traditional (April 2023), "Midnight Escapade" in Midnight Hour: A Chilling Anthology of Crime Fiction from 20 Authors of Color (November 2021), and "Those Holiday Blues", published in limited-time holiday anthology, Festive Mayhem (October 2020). She also published a short story entitled "Love Is Fragile" in the February 2016 issue of Over My Dead Body magazine.

Beyond the mystery genre, Chow has a short story called "Moon Girl" in a STEM anthology for young adults: Brave New Girls: Tales of Heroines Who Hack (July 2018). She has also published two flash fiction stories - "Gratitude" and "Hey Beautiful" in the July 2015 issue of Hyphen Magazine. Chow also published another flash fiction piece entitled "The Delicate Lotus" in the March 2015 issue of YAY! LA Magazine, her short story "The Red Book" in the April 2013 issue of Mouse Tales Press, and a flash fiction piece entitled "Look Again" in the March 2013 issue of Foliate Oak Literary Magazine, which was anthologized in the best submissions print anthology spanning stories from 2012 to 2013.

== Accolades ==
Chow has several mystery writing accolades, including Agatha, Anthony, Lefty, and Lilian Jackson Braun Award nominations.

For short fiction, she has won second place in The Sacrifice Anthology Contest, an honorable mention in the Project Keepsake Contest, earned finalist standing in the Writer Advice's 7th Annual Flash Prose Contest, and was also an honorable mention in the 2012 Whispering Prairie Press Writers Contest.

=== Literary prize nominations ===
| Year | Title | Award | Category | Result | Ref |
|---|---|---|---|---|---|
| 2020 | Mimi Lee Gets a Clue | Lefty Award | Humorous Mystery | Finalist | |
| 2021 | Mimi Lee Cracks the Code | Lefty Award | Humorous Mystery | Finalist | |
| 2022 | Death by Bubble Tea | Agatha Award | Contemporary Novel | Finalist | |
| 2022 | Death by Bubble Tea | Anthony Awards | Humorous | Finalist | |
| 2022 | Death by Bubble Tea | Lefty Award | Humorous Mystery | Finalist | |
| 2023 | Hot Pot Murder | Edgar Awards | Lilian Jackson Braun Award | Finalist | |
| 2023 | Hot Pot Murder | Lefty Award | Humorous Mystery | Finalist | |

== Bibliography ==
=== Novels ===
==== Standalone novels ====
- —— (2013). The 228 Legacy.
- —— (2015). Dragonfly Dreams.
- —— (2024). Ill-Fated Fortune.

==== Winston Wong Cozy Mysteries (as J.J. Chow) ====
- —— (2015). Seniors Sleuth.
- —— (2018). Robot Revenge.
- —— (2019). Wedding Woes.

==== Sassy Cat Mysteries ====
- —— (2020). Mimi Lee Gets a Clue.
- —— (2020). Mimi Lee Reads Between the Lines.
- —— (2021). Mimi Lee Cracks the Code.

==== L.A. Night Market Mysteries ====
- —— (2022). Death by Bubble Tea.
- —— (2023). Hot Pot Murder.

=== Short Stories/Flash Fiction ===
- "The Fall of the Tech Titan", Malice Domestic: Mystery Most Traditional, April 2023
- "Midnight Escapade", Midnight Hour, November 2021
- "Those Holiday Blues", Festive Mayhem, October 2020
- "Moon Girl", Brave New Girls: Tales of Heroines Who Hack, July 2018
- "Love Is Fragile", Over My Dead Body magazine, February 2016
- "Gratitude", Hyphen, July 2015
- "Hey Beautiful", Hyphen, July 2015
- "The Delicate Lotus", YAY! LA Magazine, March 2015
- "The Red Book", Mouse Tales Press, April 2013
- "Look Again", Foliate Oak Literary Magazine, March 2013 (also anthologized in the best of 2012–2013 stories print edition)
