= Timothy Hallinan =

American novelist

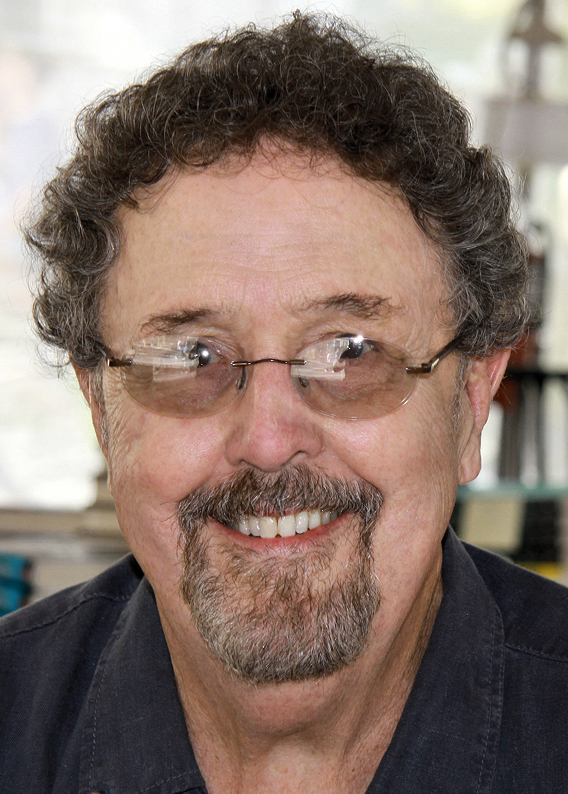
- Hallinan at the 2014 Texas Book Festival
- Born: 1949 (age 76–77)
- Occupation: Writer
- Writing career
- Genre: Thriller

Timothy Hallinan (born 1949) is an American thriller writer, based in Southern California and Southeast Asia.

In the 1990s, Hallinan created the erudite private eye Simeon Grist, who appeared in a total of six novels, all set in Los Angeles. The series was widely and well reviewed, with some titles appearing on critics' "Ten Best" lists for the year in which they appeared, such as that of the Drood Review of Mystery, but did not achieve widespread popularity. (Hallinan came out with a seventh Grist novel in 2017.)

Hallinan returned to publication in 2007 with a second series, set in Bangkok, where he has lived off and on since the early 1980s. The first book in the series is A Nail Through the Heart (2007). The fourth, The Queen of Patpong (2010), was nominated for both the Edgar and the Macavity awards. The sixth, For the Dead (2014), was chosen by The New York Times Book Review to represent Thailand in its “Thrillers from Around the World” feature.

In 2011 he launched a third series starring Junior Bender, a burglar who serves as a private detective to Los Angeles' underworld elite. The fourth book, Herbie's Game, won the Lefty Award for Best Humorous Mystery Novel in 2015.

In his non-writing career, Hallinan served as a consultant to corporations, advising on issues of television sponsorship and audience-building. He also created a firm, Hallinan Consulting, that created educators' websites on behalf of a number of public television programs, including The Rise and Fall of Jim Crow, Slavery in America, and The Supreme Court. He now writes full-time.

== Personal life ==
Hallinan lives eight months a year in Santa Monica, California, and four months a year in Southeast Asia.

== Novels ==
=== Simeon Grist series ===
Series about an erudite LA private eye. While Skin Deep was the third published novel, it was actually the first written and, according to the internal chronology of the series, takes place earlier than the other Simeon Grist books. (According to Hallinan, the "actual order of the Simeon Grist novels" is Skin Deep, The Four Last Things, Everything but the Squeal, Incinerator, The Man with No Time, The Bone Polisher, and Pulped.

- The Four Last Things (1989) ISBN 978-0-453-00650-7
- Everything but the Squeal (1990)
- Skin Deep (1991)
- Incinerator (1992)
- The Man with No Time (1993)
- The Bone Polisher (1995)
- Pulped (2017) ISBN 0982830270

=== Poke Rafferty series ===
Thrillers set in Bangkok – a travel writer trying to make a life in the Thai capital.

- A Nail Through the Heart (2007)
- The Fourth Watcher (2008) ISBN 0-06-125725-7
- Breathing Water: A Bangkok Thriller (2009) ISBN 978-0-06-167225-5
- The Queen of Patpong: A Poke Rafferty Thriller (2010)
- Hansum Man (2011)
- The Fear Artist (2012)
- For the Dead (2014)
- The Hot Countries (2015)
- Fools' River (2017)
- Chalee's Nativity ( 2017)
- Street Music (2018)

=== Junior Bender series ===
Comic thriller series about Junior Bender.

- Crashed (2010)
- Little Elvises (2011)
- The Fame Thief (2013)
- Herbie's Game (2014)
- King Maybe (2016)
- Fields Where They Lay (2016)
- Nighttown (2018)
- Rock of Ages (2022)

== Books edited by Timothy Hallinan ==
- Shaken, a fundraising anthology that Hallinan conceived and edited in the wake of the 2011 earthquake/tsunami disaster in Japan.
- Making Story, an anthology of 21 authors telling how they plot or write their stories.
