= Ellen Byron =

American mystery writer

- Born: New York
- Occupation: Novelist; Screenwriter; Producer
- Notable awards: Agatha Award

Website
- ellenbyron.com

Ellen Byron (born 1956 in New York) is an American novelist, screenwriter, and producer.

As a novelist, she has written the Cajun Country Mystery series and Vintage Cookbook Mystery series, as well as the Catering Hall Mystery series under the pseudonym Maria DiRico. She has won two Agatha Awards for Best Contemporary Novel and multiple Best Humorous Mystery Lefty Awards. Bayou Book Thief, her first Vintage Cookbook Mystery, was nominated for an Anthony Award.

As a screenwriter, she has written for Wings, Just Shoot Me!, and The Fairly OddParents.

== Biography ==
Byron was born in the borough of Queens, New York City.

She attended Tulane University. Her experiences in Louisiana inspired her Cajun Country Mystery series.

Byron has written over 200 articles for national publications. She relocated from New York to Los Angeles to pursue a television career that spanned twenty-five years. She lives in the Los Angeles area with her husband, daughter, and rescue dog.

== Awards and honors ==
Awards for Byron's writing
Year	Title	Award	Result
2015	Plantation Shudders	Agatha Award for Best First Novel	Finalist
2016	Plantation Shudders	Lefty Award for Best Humorous Mystery	Finalist
2016	Body on the Bayou	Agatha Award for Best Contemporary Novel	Finalist
2017	Body on the Bayou	Lefty Award for Best Humorous Mystery Novel	Winner
2017	A Cajun Christmas Killing	Agatha Award for Best Contemporary Novel	Finalist
2018	A Cajun Christmas Killing	Lefty Award for Best Humorous Mystery Novel	Winner
2018	Mardi Gras Murder	Agatha Award for Best Contemporary Novel	Winner
2019	Mardi Gras Murder	Lefty Award for Best Humorous Mystery Novel	Finalist
2019	Fatal Cajun Festival	Agatha Award for Best Contemporary Novel	Finalist
2020	Fatal Cajun Festival	Lefty Award for Best Humorous Mystery Novel	Finalist
2020	Murder in the Bayou Boneyard	Agatha Award for Best Contemporary Novel	Finalist
2021	Murder in the Bayou Boneyard	Lefty Award for Best Humorous Mystery Novel	Winner
2021	Cajun Kiss of Death	Agatha Award for Best Contemporary Novel	Winner
2022	Cajun Kiss of Death	Lefty Award for Best Humorous Mystery Novel	Finalist

== Publications ==
=== Cajun Country Mystery series ===
- Plantation Shudders (2015)
- Body on the Bayou (2016)
- A Cajun Christmas Killing (2017)
- Mardi Gras Murder (2018)
- Fatal Cajun Festival (2019)
- Murder in the Bayou Boneyard (2020)
- Cajun Kiss of Death (2021)

=== Catering Hall Mystery series (as Maria DiRico) ===
- Here Comes the Body (2020)
- Long Island Iced Tina (2021)
- It's Beginning to Look a Lot Like Murder (2021)
- Four Parties and a Funeral (2023)

=== Plays ===
- Graceland and Asleep on the Wind (1998)
- Election Year and So When You Get Married.... Two Short Plays. (1998)

=== Vintage Cookbook Mystery series ===
- Bayou Book Thief (2022)
- Wined and Died in New Orleans (2023)

== Television ==
Byron's television credits
Year(s)	Show	Episodes (No.)	Role
1992-1993	Flying Blind	3	Writer
1993	Joe's Life	3	Writer
1994-1997	Wings	50	Co-producer; Executive story editor; Supervising producer; Writer
1997-1998	Jenny	17	Supervising producer; Writer
2000	Young Americans	1	Writer
2000-2001	The Weber Show	8	Consulting producer; Writer
2001-2002	Maybe It's Me	21	Co-executive producer; Writer
2002-2003	Just Shoot Me!	24	Consulting producer; Writer
2003-2004	It's All Relative	20	Supervising producer; Writer
2004-2006	Still Standing	6	Co-executive producer; Consulting producer; Writer
2009	Rita Rocks	2	Writer
2010	Sonny with a Chance	8	Consulting producer
2011	Good Luck Charlie	11	Consulting producer; Writer
2014	The Tom and Jerry Show	1	Writer
2017	Bunsen is a Beast	10	Developer; Writer
2013-2017	The Fairly OddParents	22	Writer
