= Bill Cameron (mystery author) =

American author

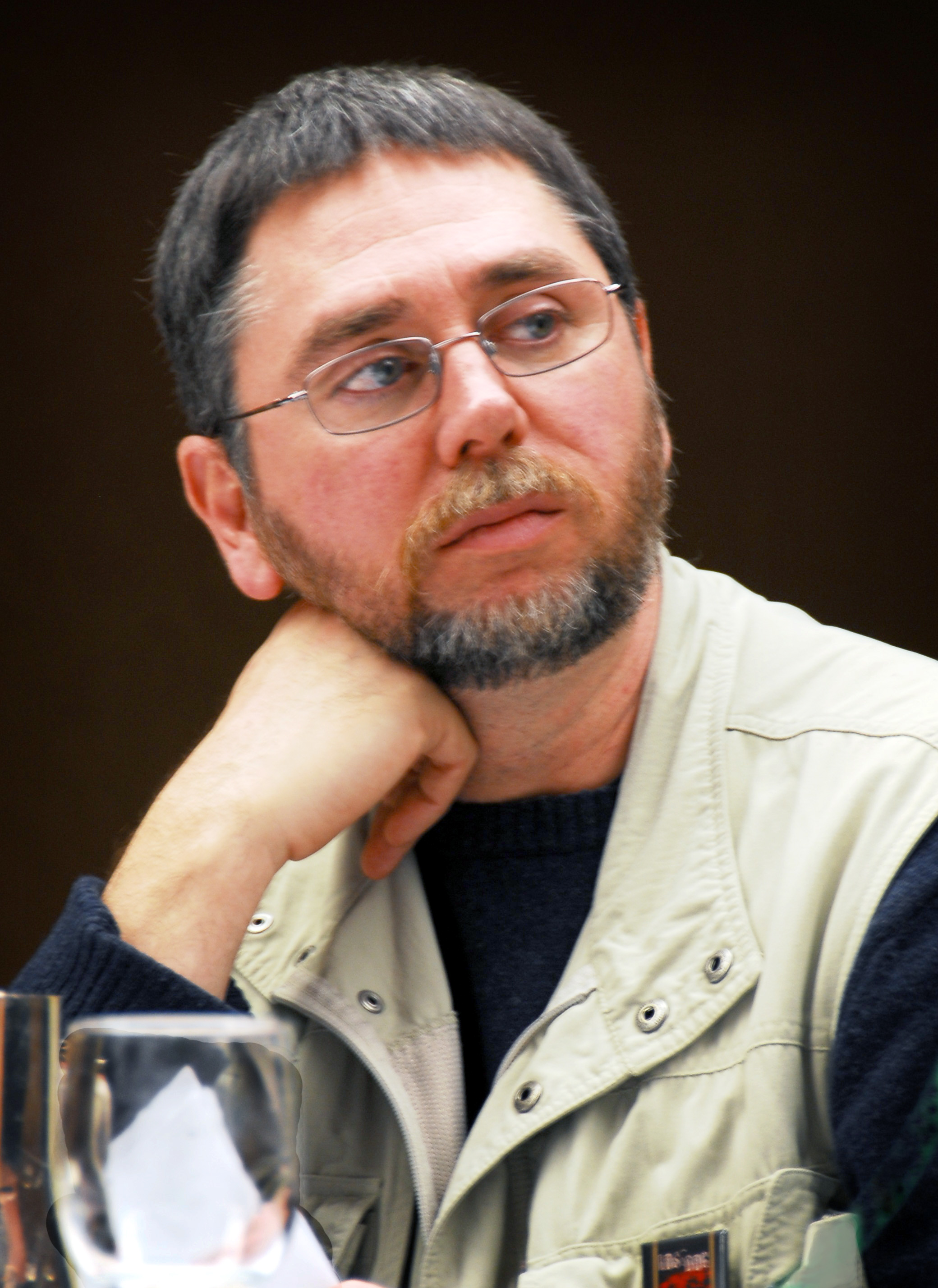
- Born: William H. Cameron; November 19, 1963 (age 62); Cincinnati, Ohio, U.S.
- Occupation: Novelist
- Writing career
- Period: 2006–present
- Genres: mystery, crime fiction, thriller, suspense
- Website: bill-cameron.com

William H. Cameron (born November 19, 1963, Cincinnati, Ohio) is an American author.

== Publishing History ==
Bill Cameron's first novel, Lost Dog (2007), was a Left Coast Crime Rocky Award nominee and a finalist for the 2008 Spotted Owl Award for best mystery in the Pacific Northwest.

His second novel, Chasing Smoke (2008), received a starred review from Library Journal and was a finalist for the 2009 Spotted Owl Award. It was also an IndieBound Notable Next for January 2009.

Cameron's third novel, Day One, was published by Tyrus Books in 2010, and features the return of his series character, Skin Kadash. Day One was a finalist for the 2011 Spotted Owl Award and was included in the Best of 2010 list by the Portland Mercury.

His fourth novel, County Line was published by Tyrus Books/F+W Crime in June 2011. County Line received a starred review from Publishers Weekly. County Line was named a Favorite of 2011 by the Portland, Oregon mystery bookstore Murder by the Book. In March 2012, County Line was named the winner of the 2012 Spotted Owl Award for Best Northwest Mystery.

Cameron's short story, 'The Princess of Felony Flats,' from the 2010 anthology First Thrills edited by Lee Child was nominated for the CWA Short Story Dagger, an award given annually by the UK-based Crime Writers' Association.

His young adult mystery, Property of the State, was named a 'Best Book of 2016: Teen' by Kirkus Reviews.

Writing as W.H. Cameron, his sixth novel, Crossroad, was published in 2019 by Crooked Lane Books. It received favorable reviews from Publishers Weekly and Kirkus Reviews.

Cameron currently lives in Eugene, Oregon.

== Bibliography ==
Novels

- 2007 – Lost Dog (Midnight Ink, 2007: ISBN 978-0-7387-0966-6)
- 2008 – Chasing Smoke (Bleak House Books, 2008: ISBN 978-1-60648-019-9)
- 2010 – Day One (Tyrus Books, 2010: ISBN 978-1-935562-08-5)
- 2011 – County Line (Tyrus Books, 2011: ISBN 978-1-935562-52-8)
- 2016 – Property of the State (Poisoned Pen Press, 2016: ISBN 978-1-929345229)
- 2019 – Crossroad (Crooked Lane Books, 2019 (Distributed by Penguin Random House): ISBN 9781643852805)

Short stories

- 2006 – "A Tall House" (published in Spinetingler Magazine)
- 2008 – "Slice of Pie" (published in Killer Year edited by Lee Child - St. Martin's Press)
- 2009 – "Coffee, Black" (published in Portland Noir edited by Kevin Sampsell - Akashic Books)
- 2010 – "The Princess of Felony Flats" (published in First Thrills edited by Lee Child - Forge Books)
- 2011 – "Sunlight Nocturne" (published in Deadly Treats edited by Anne Frasier - Nodin Press)
- 2011 – "The Last Ship" (published in West Coast Crime Wave edited by Brian Thornton - BSTSLLR)
- 2014 – "Daisy and the Desperado" (published in Murder at the Beach edited by Dana Cameron - Down & Out Books: ISBN 978-1937495800)
- 2015 – "Heat Death" (published in Alfred Hitchcock's Mystery Magazine, July/August 2015 issue)
- 2019 – "Hey Nineteen" (writing as W.H. Cameron) (published in A Beast Without a Name: Crime Fiction Inspired by the Music of Steely Dan edited by Brian Thornton - Down & Out Books: ISBN 978-1-64396-043-2)
