= Ann Parker (writer) =

Writer

Ann Parker is a writer, and was a finalist for Best Historical Novel in the 2011 Agatha Award. Her novel Silver Lies won the 2004 WILLA Literary Award in Historical Fiction. She studied at the University of California, Berkeley.

== Works ==
=== Silver Rush Series ===
1. Silver Lies (2003)
2. Iron Ties (2006)
3. Leaden Skies (2009)
4. Mercury's Rise (2011)
5. What Gold Buys (2016)
6. A Dying Note (2018)
7. Mortal Music (2020)
8. The Secret in the Wall (2022)
