= James Rollins =

American veterinarian and novelist (born 1961)

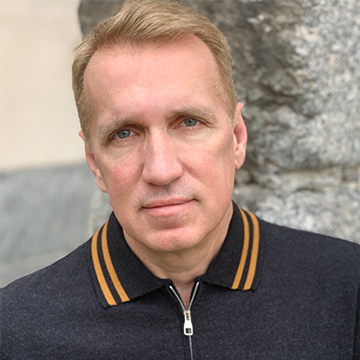
- Rollins in Milan, Italy Spring 2019
- Born: James Paul Czajkowski; August 20, 1961 (age 65); Chicago, Illinois, U.S.
- Education: Parkway West High School
- Alma mater: University of Missouri
- Occupations: Veterinarian; journalist; novelist
- Writing career
- Pen name: James Rollins; James Clemens
- Genres: Action-adventure, thriller, fantasy, mystery, techno-thriller
- Website: jamesrollins.com jamesclemens.com

James Paul Czajkowski (born August 20, 1961), better known by his pen name of James Rollins, is an American veterinarian and writer of action-adventure/thriller, mystery, and techno-thriller novels who gave up his veterinary practice in Sacramento, California to be a full-time author. Rollins' experiences and expertise as an amateur spelunker and a certified scuba diver have provided content for some of his novels, which are often set in underground or underwater locations. Under the pen name James Clemens, he has also published fantasy novels, such as Wit'ch Fire, Wit'ch Storm, Wit'ch War, Wit'ch Gate, Wit'ch Star, Shadowfall (2005), and Hinterland (2006).

== Biographical sketch ==
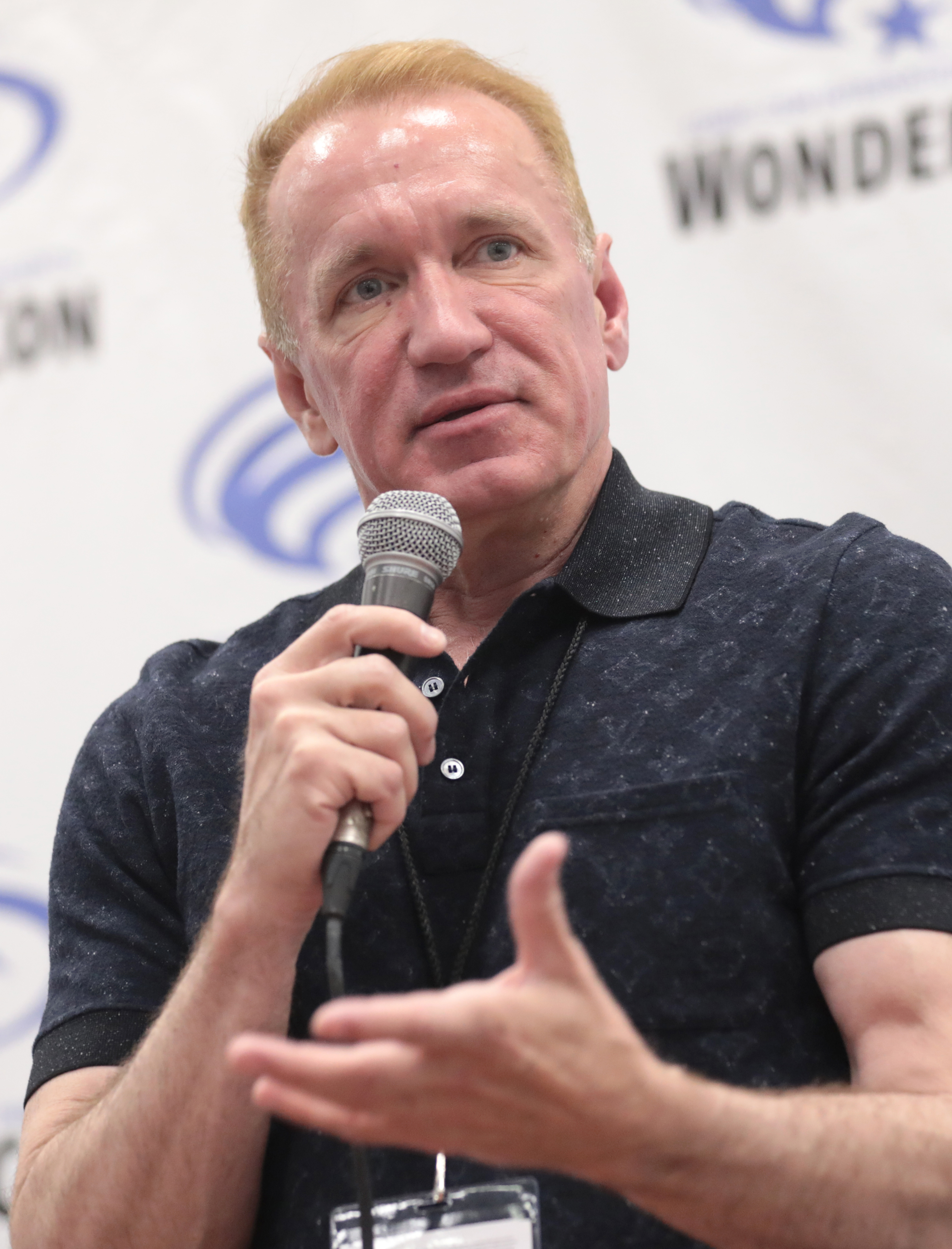
Rollins at the 2023 WonderCon.

James Paul Czajkowski was born in Chicago, Illinois. His father worked for the Libby's canning plant and his mother was a housewife.

He graduated from Parkway West High School in Ballwin, Missouri in 1979. His undergraduate work focused on evolutionary biology and he graduated from the University of Missouri in Columbia in 1985 with a doctorate in veterinary medicine (D. V. M). Soon afterward, he moved to Sacramento, California, where he established his veterinary practice.

In an August 16, 2012 interview, Rollins told SLM's Jeannette Cooperman:

For 20 years my paycheck was coming from my veterinary degree and my writing was my hobby, and I thought it would be really cool to flip that around. Veterinary medicine is much harder. It's a 14-, 16-, 18-hour-a-day job. I owned my own practice, had 24 employees. I couldn't get away, that was the biggest thing. In the 10 years I ran my own practice, I had three weeks of vacation total. I started writing during my lunch hour at the clinic—dogs barking, cats meowing—so now I can write anywhere.

== Influences ==
Rollins found the authors of the Doc Savage series inspirational as a youth and acquired an extensive collection of the popular 1930s and 1940s pulp magazine stories. Rollins was fascinated by stories of the exploits of Howard Carter and his discovery of the tomb of Tutankhamun (King Tut); this true-life tale later inspired Rollins' novel Excavation, in which the main character, archaeologist Henry Conklin, and his nephew Sam discover a lost Inca city in the mountains of the Andean jungle that contains a treasure—and a curse. He also enjoyed L. Frank Baum's Oz series, Edgar Rice Burroughs' Tarzan novels, and C. S. Lewis' Chronicles of Narnia. Additionally, he was inspired by Jules Verne and H. G. Wells, whose works he used as a springboard for creating similar contemporary novels filled with what he refers to as "the three M's of fiction: magic, mayhem, and monsters".

== First novel ==
Czajkowski sold his first novel, Wit'ch Fire (1999), under the pen name James Clemens, through Terry Brooks' publisher. Brooks had been one of the judges for a writing contest at the Maui Writers' Conference in Maui, Hawaii, in which James had entered a manuscript he had recently completed.

== Action-adventure novels ==
=== Subterranean (1999) ===
Beneath the ice at the bottom of the Earth is a magnificent subterranean labyrinth, a place of breathtaking wonders—and terrors beyond imagining. A team of specialists, led by archaeologist Ashley Carter, has been hand-picked to explore this secret place and to uncover the riches it holds. But they are not the first to venture here—and those they follow did not return. There are mysteries here older than humanity and revelations that could change the world. But there are also things that should not be disturbed—and a devastating truth that could doom Ashley and the expedition: they are not alone. The caverns are inhabited by an entire subterranean ecosystem of primitive mammals—some intelligent, others savage, all beyond the reach of today's knowledge.

=== Excavation (2000) ===
The story is set in Peru, low in the Andes, where Dr. Henry Conklin discovers a 500-year-old mummy that should not be there. While deep in the South American jungle, Conklin's nephew, Sam, stumbles upon a remarkable site nestled between two towering peaks, a place hidden from human eyes for thousands of years. Ingenious traps have been laid to ensnare the careless and unsuspecting, and wealth beyond imagining could be the reward for those with the courage to face the terrible unknown. But where this perilous journey ends—in the cold, shrouded heart of a breathtaking necropolis—something else is waiting for Sam Conklin and his exploratory party. A thing created by Man, yet not humanly possible. Something wondrous...something terrifying...a mysterious metal known only as el Sangre del Diablo (or Devil's Blood), known only to the most ancient of Incas and a secret sect of Dominican friars who have already killed and died to protect its secrets.

=== Deep Fathom (2001) ===
Ex-Navy SEAL Jack Kirkland surfaces from an aborted underwater salvage mission to find the Earth burning. Solar flares have triggered a series of gargantuan natural disasters. Earthquakes and hellfire rock the globe. Air Force One has vanished from the skies with America's president on board. Now, with the U.S. on the narrow brink of a nuclear apocalypse, Kirkland must pilot his oceangoing exploration ship, Deep Fathom, on a desperate mission miles below the ocean's surface. There, devastating secrets await him—and a power of an ancient civilization. And it will forever alter a world that's already racing toward its own destruction.

=== Amazonia (2002) ===
Four years ago, all contact with a U.S. medical-scientific expedition in the wilderness of the Amazon basin suddenly ceased; the 30-man team was declared lost and likely dead. Now, one of its members staggers into a Christian mission but dies within hours. He carries identification: he is Gerald Clark, ex-Special Forces. Two years before the expedition, while in Iraq, the CIA operative's left arm was amputated at the shoulder. Photographs of the corpse and fingerprints reveal that the arm has grown back perfectly. Unable to comprehend this inexplicable event, the United States CIA establishes a special team to return to this impenetrable secret world of unforeseen perils and to follow the dead man's trail. On arrival, they enlist Nathan Rand, the son of the lost researchers' team leader. A mysterious plague, that threatens the Earth's entire population, leads back to Gerald Clark. This means the lost expedition's destination, which holds the key to the cure, must be discovered at any cost. But the nightmare that awaits Rand and his team of scientists and seasoned U.S. Army Rangers dwarfs any danger they may have anticipated.

=== Ice Hunt (2003) ===
After an Alaskan game warden rescues a man from a crashed plane and saves him from subsequent attack by foreign soldiers, his ex-wife's piloting skills take them all to the man's intended destination, a US research base on the Arctic ice. The base was set up following the discovery by advanced ice-penetrating sonar of a derelict Russian scientific base buried within a massive iceberg, Ice Station Grendel, where the personnel all died decades earlier. A Russian submarine carrying the son of the station's former commander approaches, ostensibly to retrieve the bodies found by the Americans. Both sides know the station contains vastly important scientific secrets, worth fighting for, but neither side knows quite how the other will fight, or how Grendel itself will complicate matters. In an atmosphere of mistrust and fear, the Alaskans and the scientist overseeing the sonar project have unexpected roles to play, while in the midst of terror, unexpected allies, and betrayals, neither side can afford to lose.

=== Indiana Jones and the Kingdom of the Crystal Skull (2008) ===
In 2008, Random House commissioned Rollins to write the novelization of Indiana Jones and the Kingdom of the Crystal Skull (2008), the eponymous, American adventure science fiction film. This is the fourth film in the Indiana Jones franchise, created by George Lucas and directed by Steven Spielberg. The novelization won the Scribe Award for Best Adapted Novel (General) in 2009.

=== Altar of Eden (2009) ===
The story starts outside the Baghdad Zoo immediately after the Battle of Baghdad (2003). After being decimated during the 2003 invasion of Iraq, the floodgates have been opened for the smuggling of hundreds of exotic birds, mammals, and reptiles to Western nations. However, this crime hides a deeper secret. Years later, a Louisiana state veterinarian, Lorna Polk, is flown to a wrecked fishing trawler in the Mississippi River delta basin by the United States Customs and Border Protection (CBP). The crew is missing, but the boat holds a live cargo: a caged group of exotic animals. Initially, Polk assumes it is part of a black market smuggling racket. Then she discovers disturbing deformities that make no sense. Also, the animals all share disturbingly heightened intelligence. To uncover the truth about the origin of this strange cargo and the threat it poses, Polk must team up with a man who shares a dark and bloody past with her, now an agent with the CBP.

== Sigma Force series ==
Sigma Force is a fictional division of the U.S. DARPA program. Their chief operatives combine highly trained military skills with specialized scientific knowledge. Their purpose is to investigate sensitive scientific matters that could pose a threat to the United States. Its functions include counter-terrorism, research, and covert operations. Following the events of the first book, Sandstorm, Sigma Force moves its headquarters into a sub-basement of the Smithsonian Institution in Washington, D.C.

=== Book 1: Sandstorm (2004) ===
Originally published as a stand-alone novel, Sandstorm became the first book in the Sigma Force series. Commander Painter Crowe attempts to thwart a computer hacker who is putting the United States in danger. Meanwhile, in the British Museum, a private collection is destroyed and the cause cannot be explained. Sigma Force's quest takes them into the Arabian Desert and to a long-buried threat that may bring about the end of the balance of power.

This novel introduces Sigma Force and a mysterious opposing group, the Guild, who appear in several of Rollins' future Sigma Force novels.

=== Book 2: Map of Bones (2005) ===
The magi brought gold, frankincense, and myrrh to the Christ child; their bones may bring destruction to the world if they are allowed to remain in the hands of the thieves who stole them.

=== Book 3: Black Order (2006) ===
Sigma Force team members risk their lives to get to the heart of one of mankind's greatest mysteries: the origins of life itself. This novel features Dr. Lisa Cummings, who was first introduced in Deep Fathom.

=== Book 4: The Judas Strain (2007) ===
Sigma Force members seek to prevent an outbreak that could threaten the entire planet. The outbreak's source and the key to the cure are based on the Hindu temple complex of Angkor Wat. The book also features the apparent death of Dr. Monk Kokkalis and introduction to Sigma Force of Joe Kowalski, who first appeared in Ice Hunt.

=== Book 5: The Last Oracle (2008) ===
Sigma Force battle a group of rogue scientists who have unleashed a bio-engineering project that could bring about the extinction of humankind. An international think-tank of scientists discover a way to bio-engineer autistic children who show savant talents, in the hope of creating a world prophet who can be manipulated to create a new era of global peace on their terms.

=== Book 6: The Doomsday Key (2009) ===
Three murders occur on three different continents; each shares a puzzling, hideous disfigurement, but otherwise no other obvious connection. A clue links the father of one victim, an influential U.S. senator, to a Norwegian corporation. It is revealed that the characters are dealing with an ancient fungal parasite that was discovered and used first by the Egyptians and then, later, by eleventh century Celts and Druids as a bio-weapon.

=== "The Skeleton Key" (short story, 2011) ===
Seichan and a young urban explorer, who has tattooed on his body a map of the Catacombs of Paris, awaken in a Paris hotel after having been kidnapped and drugged, to find deadly electronic collars fastened around their necks. They are tasked to rescue the kidnapper's son who has fallen under the sway of the nefarious leader of an apocalyptic cult. The trail leads them into the dark necropolis beneath Paris. Seichan and her guide must battle the clock, as the cult leader has wired the catacombs with bombs.

This short story includes a sneak peek of the first 70 pages of The Devil Colony, in which a clue unlocked by the skeleton key plays a key role.

=== Book 7: The Devil Colony (2011) ===
SIGMA Force deals with mysterious nanotechnology that may have been mastered by an ancient Native American tribe with input from the Manasseh. The team attempts to track down a lost map, journeying to Fort Knox and the grave of Meriwether Lewis. Rollins refers to secret codes used by Thomas Jefferson and Lewis. The coded message leads Crowe to John Trumbull's painting depicting the presentation of The Declaration of Independence.

=== "Tracker" (short story, 2012) ===
In the medieval heart of Budapest, Captain Tucker Wayne and his war dog, Kane, rescue a mysterious woman fleeing three armed men. They are after the secret she holds, which will unlock a terrible treasure steeped in blood and treachery and tied to a crime going back to the fall of Nazi Germany and a heritage of suffering and pain that reaches out from the past to wreak havoc today. In a final showdown, truths are unearthed and treasures exposed. This short story exclusive includes a sneak peek at the opening chapters of Bloodline, in which further exploits of Tucker and Kane are revealed.

=== Book 8: Bloodline (2012) ===
Sigma Force follows up on information gained in Tracker. The president's daughter is kidnapped by mysterious doctors who seek her baby. President Gant's family is revealed to be a driving force behind the Guild, with their bloodline stretching back for centuries. Jack Kirkland, who first appeared in Deep Fathom, makes an appearance. The novel deals with the quest for immortality, nanotechnology, and micro-engineering.

=== Book 9: The Eye of God (2013) ===
Sigma Force chases down clues related to Attila the Hun and his fateful meeting with Pope Leo I that stopped a Hunnic invasion of Rome. The Vatican receives a package containing the skull of Genghis Khan, along with a book wrapped in his skin, leading the team to Mongolia. All the while, a nearing comet interferes with the imagery of an orbital satellite, causing it to show an image of America's Eastern Seaboard in flaming ruins. It's a race against time for Sigma to stop the apocalypse from occurring.

=== Book 10: The 6th Extinction (2014) ===
Sigma Force fights against a geneticist with a nefarious agenda for handling the extinction of species. The team travels from California, near Yosemite National Park, to the tepuis of the northern Amazon rainforest, and to the ice caves of Antarctica.

=== "The Midnight Watch" (short story, 2015) ===
In the dead of night, a faceless enemy hacks into the Smithsonian Institution's network of servers, but it is only the first strike masking a larger attack. To rescue a biologist trapped in the National Museum of Natural History and discover the true intent behind an assault that grows bolder and bloodier by the minute, Sigma Force must unleash its most headstrong operative, Joe Kowalski.

=== Book 11: The Bone Labyrinth (2015) ===
An amazing discovery is made when an earthquake reveals a subterranean Catholic chapel in the remote mountains of Croatia. An investigative team finds the bones of a Neanderthal woman as well as an elaborate cave painting depicting an immense battle between Neanderthal tribes and monstrous shadowy figures. At the same time, a bloody assault is carried out on a DARPA funded primate research center outside of Atlanta. Sigma Force sends operatives to look into both cases, but does not realize these events may be connected. Plunged into a battle for the future of humanity, the Sigma Force operatives uncover the true source of human intelligence.

=== "Crash and Burn" (short story, 2016) ===
On a transatlantic flight, Seichan and Kowalski must set aside their differences when a mysterious force knocks their airplane out of the sky.

=== Book 12: The Seventh Plague (2016) ===
Two years ago, a famous archaeologist was thought lost in the Sudanese desert during a search for proof of the ten plagues of Moses. His sudden reappearance, and subsequent death, reveal that someone had begun mummifying his body while he was still alive. When the medical team who performed the autopsy falls ill with a strange disease which quickly spreads throughout Cairo, Safia al-Maaz, who originally appeared in Sandstorm, reaches out to Sigma Force for help.

=== "Ghost Ship" (short story, 2017) ===
The discovery of a burned body sprawled on a remote Australian beach shatters the vacation plans of Gray Pierce and Seichan.

=== Book 13: The Demon Crown (2017) ===
An ancient species of deadly parasitic wasp is unleashed upon the islands of Hawaii, where Gray and Seichan are wrapping up their vacation. Teamed with Kowalski and a trio of native Hawaiians, the pair must uncover the perpetrators and bring them to justice. Meanwhile, Kat, Monk and the newly appointed Librarian of Congress, Elena Delgado, follow a trail of clues left across Europe by James Smithson, the mysterious founder of the Smithsonian Institution, to discover a possible way to contain the outbreak.

=== Book 14: Crucible (2019) ===
Gray is thrown into action as he discovers his house ransacked, his lover missing, and Kat unconscious on the kitchen floor. Left without any leads, Gray and his team turn to a brilliant neurologist to get answers from the only witness: the comatose Kat. What Gray learns sets the team on a quest for answers to a mystery that reaches as far back as the Spanish Inquisition and to a reviled medieval text known as the Malleus Maleficarum (The Hammer of Witches). What he uncovers reveals a frightening truth in the present and a future on the brink of annihilation.

=== Book 15: The Last Odyssey (2020) ===
In the frozen tundra of Greenland, a group of modern-day researchers stumble upon a medieval ship buried a half-mile below the ice. The ship's hold contains a collection of artifacts dating back to the Bronze Age. Inside the captain's cabin is found a clockwork gold map embedded with an intricate silver astrolabe. Once activated, the moving map traces the path of Odysseus's famous ship as it sailed away from Troy. But the route detours as the map opens to reveal a fiery river leading to a hidden realm underneath the Mediterranean Sea, the subterranean world of Tartarus. When word of Tartarus spreads, and of the cache of miraculous weapons said to be hidden there, tensions explode in this volatile region. Sigma Force must now go where humans fear to tread. To prevent a tyrant from igniting a global war, they must cross the very gates of Hell.

=== Book 16: Kingdom of Bones (2022) ===
Sigma Force investigates a viral outbreak deep in the heart of the Congo.

=== Book 17: Tides of Fire (2023) ===
Sigma Force must intervene when a research station in the Coral Sea comes under siege during a geological disaster that triggers earthquakes, tsunamis, and volcanic eruptions.

=== Book 18: Arkangel (2024) ===
The execution of a Vatican archivist within the shadow of the Kremlin exposes a conspiracy going back three centuries to the bloody era of the Russian Tsars. Before his murder, he manages to dispatch a coded message, a warning of a terrifying threat, one tied to a secret buried within the Golden Library of Tsars, a vast and treasured archive that had vanished into history.

=== Adaptations ===
A television adaptation of the book series is in development from Absentia creator Matt Cirulnick, Amazon MGM Studios, Leonardo DiCaprio ’s Appian Way Productions, Oakhurst Entertainment and Talaria Media.

== Fantasy novels ==
=== The Banned and the Banished series ===
The Banned and the Banished is a fantasy novel series that follows a girl named Elena, "who ripens into the heritage of lost power".

The series is a pentalogy. The five books are as follows:

1. Wit'ch Fire
2. Wit'ch Storm
3. Wit'ch War
4. Wit'ch Gate
5. Wit'ch Star

=== Godslayer series ===
==== Godslayer Book One: Shadowfall (2005) ====
For 4,000 years, the people of the Nine Lands have lived peacefully under the guidance of their hundred gods. When the goddess Meeryn is murdered the peace is shattered, and Tylar de Noche – a defrocked knight who, as sole witness, is now sole suspect – must find the killer and prove himself innocent. Tylar turns to Delia, a priestess and love interest, and to Rogger, a thief wise to the ways of the criminal underworld. Slogging hither and yon for scraps of clues, the three begin to suspect that the supposedly pacific gods are in fact engaged in an ongoing struggle for power and control. The self-absorption of the gods and the apathetic ignorance of the people form stumbling blocks on Tylar's quest.

==== Godslayer Book Two: Hinterland (2006) ====
Failed Shadowknight Tylar witnessed the death of a god, whose blood healed his deformities but branded him a Godslayer and a hunted criminal. In this second volume, Tylar's struggle for the truth is vindicated when he is officially reinstated as a Shadowknight. Yet this is a trap, revealed as Sithryn forces flow from the Ice Eyrie to wage a deadly siege, trapping Tylar and his friends. But even Tylar's skill and magic cannot save the Citadel of Tashijan, ancient Shadowknight headquarters, for something foul lies at the heart of their Order. The Cabal has infiltrated the inner council and Tylar and his allies must flee for now there can be no refuge from evil.

==== Other Godslayer Books ====
On the FAQ section of his website, Rollins announces plans for further novels: "There are more plans for the Godslayer books. The working title for Book Three is God-Sword. Besides continuing the storyline, it will discover much more about Laurelle, her past, and her perilous journey to a god hidden in the heart of a volcano. God-Sword will finish the first trilogy. And there may be a second trilogy with many of the same characters."

On February 10, 2015, Rollins wrote in an AMA ("Ask Me Anything") on Reddit.com: "Third book is done; fourth is midway. Once the fifth is done, the entire series is slated for publication, each book coming out 6 months apart, starting with a re-release of the first two."

== Collaboration with Rebecca Cantrell ==
Rollins collaborated with the mystery writer Rebecca Cantrell to write several works in the Order of the Sanguines series (comprising a trilogy published in print and digital formats, plus a number of short fiction e-books): City of Screams (2012), a novella set in Afghanistan; The Blood Gospel (2013); Blood Brothers (2013), an e-short; Innocent Blood (2013); and Blood Infernal (2015).

== Collaboration with Grant Blackwood ==
Rollins collaborated with the thriller writer Grant Blackwood to write multiple works in the Tucker Wayne series of military thriller novels: The Kill Switch (2014) and War Hawk (2015). Tucker Wayne also appears in the SIGMA Force series in "Tracker".

== Bibliography ==
=== As James Rollins ===
==== Stand-alone action-adventure novels ====
- Subterranean (1999)
- Excavation (2000)
- Deep Fathom (2001)
- Amazonia (2002)
- Ice Hunt (2003)
- Indiana Jones and the Kingdom of the Crystal Skull (2008) (novelization)
- Altar of Eden (2009)
- Trust No One (2026)

==== Sigma Force series ====
1. Sandstorm (2004)
2. Map of Bones (2005)
3. Black Order (2006)
3.5 Kowalski's in Love (2006) [short story]
4. The Judas Strain (2007)
5. The Last Oracle (2008)
6. The Doomsday Key (2009)
6.5 The Skeleton Key (2011) [short story]
7. The Devil Colony (2011)
7.5 Tracker (2012) [short story]
8. Bloodline (2012)
9. The Eye of God (2013)
9.5 The Devil's Bones: Cotton Malone vs. Grey Pierce (2014) (with Steve Berry) [short story]
10. The 6th Extinction (2014)
10.5 The Midnight Watch (2015) [short story]
11. The Bone Labyrinth (2015)
11.5 Crash and Burn (2016) [short story]
12. The Seventh Plague (2016)
12.5 Ghost Ship (2017) [short story]
13. The Demon Crown (2017)
14. Crucible (2019)
15. The Last Odyssey (2020)
16. Kingdom of Bones (2022)
17. Tides of Fire (2023)
18. Arkangel (2024)

==== Tucker Wayne Series (with Grant Blackwood) ====
1. The Kill Switch (2014)
2. War Hawk (January, 2016)

==== The Order of the Sanguines Trilogy (with Rebecca Cantrell) ====
0.5 City of Screams (2012) [short story]
1. The Blood Gospel (2013)
1.5 Blood Brothers (2013) [short story]
2. Innocent Blood (2013)
3. Blood Infernal (2015)

==== MoonFall series ====
1. The Starless Crown (2022)
2. The Cradle of Ice (2023)
3. A Dragon of Black Glass (2025)
4. A Fist of Molten Fire (2026)

==== Kids & Adult series ====
1. Jake Ransom and the Skull King's Shadow (2009)
2. Jake Ransom and the Howling Sphinx (2011)

==== Anthologies ====
- Thriller: Stories to Keep You Up All Night (2006)
  - "Kowalski's In Love"
- Warriors (2010)
  - "The Pit"
- Fear (2010)
  - "Tagger"
- Thrillers: 100 Must Reads (2010)
  - "Jack Finney's Invasion of the Body Snatchers"
- FaceOff (2014)
  - "The Devil's Bones"

=== As James Clemens ===
==== The Banned and the Banished series ====
1. Wit'ch Fire (1998)
2. Wit'ch Storm (1999)
3. Wit'ch War (2000)
4. Wit'ch Gate (2001)
5. Wit'ch Star (2002)

==== The Godslayer series ====
1. Shadowfall (2005)
2. Hinterland (2006)
