= Susanna Calkins =

American mystery writer

- Born: November 3, 1971 (age 54); Philadelphia, Pennsylvania, U.S.
- Education: Northwestern University, M.S. in education; Purdue University, M.A. and Ph.D., both in history
- Occupations: Mystery writer; historian; college administrator
- Writing career
- Notable awards: Macavity Award for Best Historical Novel, 2016
- Website: www.susannacalkins.com

Susanna Calkins (born November 3, 1971) is an American writer of historical mysteries, an historian, and a university teacher and administrator. Through 2020, her publications include five mystery novels in two series, as well as a work of non-fiction about higher education. Her third novel, The Masque of a Murderer won the Sue Feder Historical Mystery Award (a Macavity Award) in 2016 for Best Historical Novel.

Born in Philadelphia, Calkins attended Northwestern University, graduating with a Master of Science in education. She then went to graduate school at Purdue University, earning Master of Arts and Doctor of Philosophy degrees in history. Calkins was an assistant professor of history at the University of Louisville through 2003 before becoming a lecturer in higher-education administration and associate director of Searle Center for Advanced Learning & Teaching at Northwestern University. Calkins lives with her husband and two sons in the Chicago area.

== Critical reception ==
Calkins' first four novels, the Lucy Campion series, are set in 17th-century London. Mystery author Stefanie Pintoff says of the first novel, A Murder at Rosamund's Gate, "Susanna Calkins makes Restoration England come alive... Murder, romance, and flawless social history combine into a beautifully crafted mystery...".

Critic Bethany Latham finds Calkins' second novel, From the Charred Remains, disappointing. The protagonist, Campion, is naive in matters of love, the other characters are "unevenly crafted", and the plot is too often contrived, she says.

The third novel, The Masque of a Murderer, won the Sue Feder Historical Mystery Award (a Macavity Award) in 2016 for Best Historical Novel. Writing for the Historical Novel Society, reviewer Rebecca Henderson Palmer praises the novel for its historical detail. "The printing presses, the Quakers’ struggles with the king, the searcher with her bell, the scold's bridle, the societal upheaval after both the plague, and then the fire – all provide a setting that becomes another character in the tale."

Publishers Weekly gives a mixed review of the fourth novel in the series, Death Along the River Fleet. "Calkins deftly evokes period attitudes toward mental illness," the reviewer writes, "but with a pivotal character too impaired to generate much suspense or action, the first half of the story doesn’t do justice to Lucy’s resourcefulness or the author’s full gifts."

Kirkus Reviews says of Calkins' Murder Knocks Twice, "A spunky sleuth and plenty of period flavor enliven the first in a new series...", which is set in a speakeasy in Chicago.

== Bibliography ==
=== Lucy Campion series ===
- A Murder at Rosamund's Gate (2013)
- From the Charred Remains (2014)
- The Masque of a Murderer (2015)
- A Death Along the River Fleet (2016)
- The Sign of the Gallows (2021)
- The Cry of the Hangman (2021)
- Death Among the Ruins (2023)

=== Speakeasy series ===
- Murder Knocks Twice (2019)
- The Fate of a Flapper (2020)

=== Non-fiction ===
- Learning and Teaching in Higher Education: The Reflective Professional, 2nd ed. with Greg Light and Roy Cox (2009)
- "Colonial Whips, Royal Writs and the Quaker Challenge: Elizabeth Hooton's Voyages through New England in the Seventeenth Century"
