= Sisters in Crime =

Organization of women mystery authors

Sisters in Crime (SinC) is a writing organization focused on increasing equity and inclusion for women crime writers within the publishing industry. The group has 4,500 members in 60+ regional chapters worldwide, offering networking, advice and support to mystery authors. Members are authors, readers, publishers, agents, booksellers and librarians bound by their affection for the mystery genre and their support of women who write mysteries.

SinC also runs an annual monitoring project (Sisters in Crime Monitoring Project Report) to evaluate national and regional publishing trends within the crime genre with the goal of tracking crime publications written by women. The report is called the Business of Books Survey.

== History ==
Events leading up to the formation of Sisters in Crime included a conference at Hunter College on Women in the Mystery Genre in 1986, at which Sara Paretsky spoke on growing use of graphic sadism against women in mysteries; a letter by Phyllis Whitney to the Mystery Writers of America, pointing out that women were not being nominated for awards; an initial meeting of interested women at the October 1986 Bouchercon World Mystery Convention in Baltimore convened by Sara Paretsky; and a meeting at Sandra Scoppettone's loft during the annual Edgars week, at which the organization was formed.

At the 1987 Boucheron in Minneapolis, SinC established a steering committee led by Dorothy Salisbury; Sara Paretsky was named its first president. The following year, the organization held its first election, during which Nancy Pickard became the group's first elected president. Organization membership was open to all writers, including unpublished authors, librarians, booksellers, and other women involved with the genre.

In its early years, SinC faced backlash and discrimination from critics who accused the organization of being "anti-men", and argued that there was not a need for an organization focused on women crime fiction writers. Nevertheless, SinC continued to organize and gain new members. In the late 1980s, local chapters of SinC began to form around the United States, with the first chapter organized in Los Angeles in 1988. By 2017, the organization had fifty-two chapters, throughout the U.S., Canada, and Europe. The group also connects members across geographic boundaries through "Support and Information Groups" (SIGs).

In 1997, SinC joined the Authors' Coalition of America (AC), to support international copyright distributions of members' work. This achievement took place under the leadership of SinC president Annette Meyers, and is recognized as a turning point for the organization which had minimal funding and financial resources until this point. In 2010, SinC established the "We Love Libraries!" Program, a grant program providing book-buying funds to American libraries, and the "We Love Bookstores" program which provides funds to local bookstores. The organization also provides academic research grants, emergency grant programs to support writers in times of financial struggle, and numerous webinars and write-in events. The organization also has its own podcast, "Sisters in Crime Writers' Podcast", a biannual journal "SinC Bulletin", and an online merchandise store.

In an effort to better acknowledge the diversity of SinC membership and welcome writers of different backgrounds and identities, the organization has revised its mission statement several times to be more inclusive. The organization hosts Frankie's List, an ongoing reference list of crime writers from historically marginalized communities. The list is named for its creator, Frankie Y. Bailey, SinC's first African-American president. Sherry Harris (2018-2019 President) established the Pride Award, a grant to an emerging LGBTQ+ crime fiction writer. The organization also administers The Eleanor Taylor Bland Crime Fiction Writer of Color Award.

== Leadership ==
SinC leadership includes a board consisting of an executive council, coordinators and staff. Sitting SinC presidents have a tradition of passing down white seal stuffed animal known as "Sealine", initially purchased by former president Susan Dunlap to highlight the organization's "innovation, humor, and outspokenness" and to become a contrasting symbol for SinC's anti-corporate focus, and their goal of combating discrimination in the genre. Sealine wears a necklace made of keychains associated from each president, a tradition started by former president Kate Grilley.

List of presidents:

- Dorothy Salisbury (1986–1987) Head of the initial steering committee
- Sara Paretsky (1987–1988)
- Nancy Pickard (1988–1989)
- Margaret Maron (1989–1990)
- Susan Dunlap (1990–1991)
- Carolyn Hart (1991–1992)
- P.M. Carlson (1992–1993)
- Linda Grant (1993–1994)
- Barbara D'Amato (1994–1995)
- Elaine Raco Chase (1995–1996)
- Annette Meyers (1996–1997)
- Sue Henry (1997–1998)
- Medora Sale (1998–1999)
- Barbara Burnett Smith (1999–2000)
- Claire McNab (2000–2001)
- Joanna Carl/Eve Sandstrom (2001–2002)
- Kate Clark Flora (2002–2003)
- Kate Grilley (2003–2004)
- Patricia Houck Sprinkle (2004–2005)
- Libby Fischer Hellmann (2005–2006)
- Rochelle Majer Krich (2006–2007)
- Lucy Burdette (2007–2008)
- Judy Clemens/J.C. Lane (2008–2009)
- Marcia Talley (2009–2010)
- Cathy Pickens (2010–2011)
- Frankie Y. Bailey (2011–2012)
- Hank Phillippi Ryan (2012–2013)
- Laura DiSilverio (2013–2014)
- Catriona McPherson (2014–2015)
- Leslie Budewitz (2015–2016)
- Diane Vallere (2016–2017)
- Kendel Lynn (2017–2018)
- Sherry Harris (2018–2019)
- Lori Rader-Day (2019–2020)
- Sandra SG Wong (2020–2021)
- Stephanie Gayle (2021–2022)
- JenniferJ. Chow (2022–2023)
- Kelly Oliver (2023-2024)
- Tracee de Hahn (2024-2025)
- Raquel V. Reyes (2025-2026)

== See also ==
- Davitt Awards
- List of female detective/mystery writers
- List of female detective characters
