= The Cat Who Played Brahms =

1987 novel by Lilian Jackson Braun

- Soft cover
- Author: Lilian Jackson Braun
- Language: English
- Series: The Cat Who series
- Genre: Mystery
- Publisher: Jove
- Publication date: 1987
- Publication place: United States
- Media type: Print (hardback & paperback)
- Pages: 185 pp
- ISBN: 0-515-09050-6
- OCLC: 16059763
- Dewey Decimal: 813/.54 21
- LC Class: PS3552.R354 C344 1987
- Preceded by: The Cat Who Saw Red
- Followed by: The Cat Who Played Post Office

The Cat Who Played Brahms is the fifth book in Lilian Jackson Braun's The Cat Who series, published in 1987.

== Plot ==
Jim Qwilleran decides to get out of the city for a while and go on vacation to Moose County, Pickax, in the countryside. He stays at a lakeside cabin, owned by his old friend, Aunt Fanny. He has plans to write a book, however his plans get delayed when a peaceful fishing trip catches a body. Or is it simply an old tire, like the locals claim?

== Awards ==
The novel was nominated for the 1988 Anthony Award in the "Best Paperback Original" category, losing out to The Monkey's Raincoat by Robert Crais.
