= The Cat Who Went Bananas =

2005 book by Lilian Jackson Braun

- First edition (h/b)
- Author: Lilian Jackson Braun
- Cover artist: Walter Harper
- Language: English
- Series: The Cat Who series
- Genre: Mystery
- Publisher: G. P. Putnam's Sons (h/b); Jove Books (p/b)
- Publication date: 2005
- Publication place: United States
- Media type: Print (hardback & paperback)
- Pages: 223 (hardcover)
- ISBN: 0-515-09320-3
- OCLC: 17197171
- Preceded by: The Cat Who Talked Turkey
- Followed by: The Cat Who Dropped a Bombshell

The Cat Who Went Bananas is the 2005 novel in The Cat Who... series by Lilian Jackson Braun.

== Plot introduction ==
Jim Qwilleran reviews the local play for the Moose County Something. Polly is busy with the grand opening of The Pirates Chest, a local bookstore funded by the K Fund. While going about with his daily life, one of the cast members of The Importance of Being Earnest is killed during a car accident. Rumors circulate after it is discovered Ronnie Dickson had a large amount of alcohol in his system. Jim has a sneaky suspicion over newcomer Alden Wade, a notorious ladies man. In order to get closer to Alden, Qwill writes a book about the Hibbard House, run by an eccentric Violet Hibbard. It's up to Qwill, Koko, and Yum-Yum to solve the mystery.

== Reception ==
The Cat Who Went Bananas has been reviewed by Kirkus Reviews ("Fans will go bananas; others may go Wilde."), Publishers Weekly (".. lacks the charm of earlier adventures .."), and the Bristol Herald Courier ("This book is more about local color than the mystery. ... If you like light mysteries and love cats, this is a book for you."). The Booklist gave the book a positive review, remarking that, despite being the 27th book in the series, "[w]hat keeps readers flocking back to Braun's books is her stellar cast of characters", which is still present in The Cat Who Went Bananas. Writing for the Library Journal, Rasmussen criticizes the weak plot, commenting on the lack of a solution to the mystery and the sudden ending, and concludes by saying that "[o]nly Braun's most devoted fans will enjoy this".
