= The Cat Who Dropped a Bombshell =

2006 novel by Lilian Jackson Braun

- Author: Lilian Jackson Braun
- Language: English
- Series: The Cat Who series
- Genre: Mystery
- Publisher: Putnam Adult
- Publication date: 2006
- Publication place: United States
- Media type: Print (hardback & paperback)
- Pages: 208 pp
- ISBN: 0-399-15307-1
- OCLC: 60589186
- Dewey Decimal: 813/.54 22
- LC Class: PS3552.R354 C3355 2006
- Preceded by: The Cat Who Went Bananas
- Followed by: The Cat Who Had 60 Whiskers

The Cat Who Dropped A Bombshell is the twenty-eighth book in The Cat Who series by Lilian Jackson Braun. This book contains a fictional interview (with true facts) between Ms. Braun and Jim Qwilleran, a main character in the story.

== Plot ==
To commemorate town of Pickax's 150th anniversary Qwilleran's barn will be sketched by Nathan and Doris Ledfield's nephew, an architectural student named Harvey. He brings along his fiancée Clarissa Moore, a journalism student. When they arrive Harvey begins sketching but the cat Koko drops on his head. Harvey Clarissa break up after they return to southern Michigan. She returns to Pickax looking for a job at The Moose County Something. She confesses to Qwilleran she never was really engaged to Harvey.

Since Harvey never got Clarissa a ring Doris Ledfield had given her one, not knowing the engagement was a ruse. The Ledfields come down with allergies. Clarissa wants to return the ring but the Ledfields don't answer the phone and she is not she allowed to go in their house. Qwilleran calls the Ledfields’ doctor, who is considering calling in an allergy specialist. Both the Ledfields die from respiratory complications.

Clarissa brings her friend Vicky to Pickax to participate in a kitten auction for charity and to watch the Labor Day Pickax Now parade. She leaves before she has a chance to speak to Qwilleran, but leaves a letter for him. The letter says that Harvey had come to Moose County to ask the Ledfields for money for a ski lodge he had in mind but they refused. Clarissa had told Harvey, Vicky and Vicky's boyfriend about deadly mold on which she wrote a report for journalism school. Vicky's boyfriend, a construction specialist, had said that it could be found in the closets of old houses. Clarissa had told Vicky how Harvey had become furious when the Ledfields would not fund his project even though he seemed he would be entering college and getting married. He had even refused to go to church that morning and Vicky suspected he had used the time to put mold in the ventilation ducts of the Ledfields' bedroom.

Qwilleran shares this with the police, and Harvey is arrested. In the meantime, the Ledfields' will is read, revealing that they had left their collection of mounted animals to the city and funded the creation of a music center in Pickax and a museum in their old home. They also gave funds for a massive music foundation that would make the Ledfield name famous worldwide, to be set up in a city with a population of one million or more. Shortly after the mystery is solved, a tragic accident at the ill-fated Black Creek bridge takes the life of Qwill's long-time eccentric friend, Elizabeth Hart, the owner of the Grist Mill fine restaurant. In honor of her, the Black Creek Bridge is set to be repaired so that no more deaths occur.

== Reception ==
Publishers Weekly called the book "disappointing". Kirkus Reviews wrote that fans of the series would "no doubt enjoy the latest from Pickax." Maggie Harding of Book Reporter called it a "charming quick read."
