= The Cat Who... =

Novels series by Lilian Jackson Braun

There are over two dozen books in The Cat Who. . . series.

The Cat Who... is a series of twenty-nine mystery novels and three related collections by Lilian Jackson Braun and published by G. P. Putnam's Sons, featuring a reporter named Jim Qwilleran and his Siamese cats, Kao K'o-Kung (Koko for short) and Yum Yum. The first was written in 1966, with two more following in 1967 and 1968. The fourth appeared eighteen years later, after which at least one new novel was published every year until 2007. A thirtieth novel, originally announced for 2008, was postponed indefinitely by its publisher and then canceled after the author's death in 2011. It remains unpublished.

== Main characters ==
James Mackintosh Qwilleran is the main human character in the books. Qwilleran (Qwill to his friends) is a man who goes from late forties to mid fifties over the course of the series. He is often described as looking melancholy or brooding, but he is witty and enjoyable company. His most distinguishing feature is his "luxuriant moustache."

"Kao K’o-Kung" is the full name of the Siamese cat who is almost always referred to as Koko. He is named after a 13th-century Chinese artist whose name is usually written in modern Pinyin as Gao Kegong. He has the appearance of a prize-winning show-cat and an obstinate attitude toward anything he does not like.

Yum Yum is also Siamese, and had a troubled past. Yum Yum is named after a character in the opera The Mikado by Gilbert and Sullivan who is also the ward of a man named Ko-Ko. Yum Yum is described as being smaller than Koko, and far more affectionate. Her beautiful violet-blue eyes are slightly crossed.

== Novels ==
Order Number	Release year	Title	ISBN	Peak on NY Times Best Seller List	Summary
1	1966	The Cat Who Could Read Backwards	0-515-09017-4	--	Qwilleran and Koko's first meeting.
2	1967	The Cat Who Ate Danish Modern	0-515-08712-2	--	Qwill is given the interior design beat for his newspaper. He also meets Yum Yum.
3	1968	The Cat Who Turned On and Off	0-515-08794-7	--	Qwill goes to Junktown to write a Christmas feature series.
4	1986	The Cat Who Saw Red	0-515-09016-6	--	Qwill gets assigned to the culinary beat and reunites with an old flame.
5	1987	The Cat Who Played Brahms	0-515-09050-6	--	A contemplative Qwill withdraws from the big city to visit his Aunt Fanny in Moose County.
6	1988	The Cat Who Played Post Office	0-515-09320-3	--	A bicycling mishap and a brightly painted room have Qwill's mustache twitching.
7	1988	The Cat Who Knew Shakespeare	0-515-09582-6	--	Fire and death at the newspaper offices.
8	1988	The Cat Who Sniffed Glue	0-515-09954-6	--	Vandalism appears in Pickax and a couple is murdered.
9	1989	The Cat Who Went Underground	0-515-10123-0	--	Qwill goes on vacation and carpenters in the area start dying.
10	1990	The Cat Who Talked to Ghosts	0-515-10265-2	--	One of Qwill's friends is found scared to death in her own home.
11	1990	The Cat Who Lived High	0-515-10566-X	--	Qwill returns to Junktown to try to restore an old apartment building.
12	1991	The Cat Who Knew a Cardinal	0-515-10786-7	11	Pickax's principal is found fatally shot after a party at Qwill's barn.
13	1991	The Cat Who Moved a Mountain	0-515-10950-9	9	Qwill and the cats go on retreat in the Potatoes.
14	1992	The Cat Who Wasn't There	0-515-11127-9	11	Sixteen Moose County residents go on group tour to Scotland.
15	1993	The Cat Who Went Into the Closet	0-515-11332-8	15	Qwill attempts to solve a murder mystery long distance.
16	1994	The Cat Who Came to Breakfast	0-515-11564-9	6	Qwill and his felines take a trip to Breakfast Island resort.
17	1995	The Cat Who Blew the Whistle	0-515-11824-9	8	A railroad buff and president of a local bank disappears.
18	1996	The Cat Who Said Cheese	0-515-12027-8	5	A stranger checks into the New Pickax Hotel. Not too long after, the hotel is bombed.
19	1997	The Cat Who Tailed a Thief	0-515-12240-8	9	Small actions of theft are occurring in Pickax and a few people are found dead.
20	1998	The Cat Who Sang for the Birds	0-515-12463-X	5	An old farmhouse across from the new art center burns down.
21	1999	The Cat Who Saw Stars	0-515-12739-6	6	Qwill takes a vacation in Mooseville.
22	2000	The Cat Who Robbed a Bank	0-515-12994-1	9	A jewelry dealer from Chicago comes to visit and is murdered.
23	2001	The Cat Who Smelled a Rat	0-399-14665-2	2	A very dry year and concerns about wildfires have everyone praying for snow.
24	2002	The Cat Who Went Up The Creek	0-515-13438-4	4	Qwill and the cats stay at a riverside inn in Black Creek.
25	2003	The Cat Who Brought Down the House	0-515-13655-7	3	An aging film star retires to Pickax.
26	2004	The Cat Who Talked Turkey	0-399-15107-9	4	The long-absent turkey population begins to return to Pickax.
27	2005	The Cat Who Went Bananas	0-399-15224-5	14	A new bookstore opens.
28	2006	The Cat Who Dropped a Bombshell	0-399-15307-1	3	Moose County prepares for its 150th anniversary.
29	2007	The Cat Who Had 60 Whiskers	978-0399153907	10	Polly unexpectedly takes a library job in Paris, leaving without even saying goodbye to Qwill, and a gardener's so-called accidental death does not seem so accidental.
30	--	The Cat Who Smelled Smoke	978-0399154744		Unpublished. Title supposedly a reference to events in the previous book.

=== Related works by Lilian Jackson Braun ===
1. The Cat Who Had 14 Tales, 1988 (ISBN 0-515-09497-8): an anthology of unrelated short stories involving various cats. Note that Qwilleran, Koko and Yum Yum do not appear in these tales.
2. Short and Tall Tales: Moose County Legends Collected by James Mackintosh Qwilleran, 2002 (ISBN 0-515-13635-2): collected anecdotes and regional folklore from residents of Pickax & environs
3. The Private Life of the Cat Who ...: Tales of Koko and Yum Yum (from the Journals of James Mackintosh Qwilleran), 2004 (ISBN 0-515-13832-0): collection of extracts from several previous works with limited new material

=== Related works by other authors ===
- The Cat Who... Companion, 1998 (ISBN 0-425-18642-3) by Sharon A. Feaster, including Braun interview
- The Cat Who... Quiz Book, 2003 (ISBN 0-425-19187-7) by Robert J. Headrick, Jr., with introduction by Braun
- The Cat Who... Cookbook, 2000 (ISBN 0-425-17674-6) by Julie Murphy and Sally Abney Stempinski, with foreword by Braun
- The Cat Who... Reunion Cookbook, 2006 (ISBN 0-425-21188-6) by Julie Murphy and Sally Abney Stempinski, with foreword by Braun
- The Cat Who Killed Lilian Jackson Braun, 2003 (ISBN 1-893-22484-8), a parody novel by Robert Kaplow

== See also ==
- List of fictional cats in literature
- The Cat Who Came for Christmas, an unrelated 1987 memoir by Cleveland Amory
- The Cat Who Walks Through Walls, an unrelated 1985 novel by Robert A. Heinlein
