= The Cat Who Sniffed Glue =

1988 novel by Lilian Jackson Braun

- First edition (h/b)
- Author: Lilian Jackson Braun
- Language: English
- Series: The Cat Who series
- Genre: Mystery
- Publisher: G. P. Putnam's Sons (h/b); Jove Books (p/b)
- Publication date: 1988
- Publication place: United States
- Media type: Print (hardback & paperback)
- Preceded by: The Cat Who Knew Shakespeare
- Followed by: The Cat Who Went Underground

The Cat Who Sniffed Glue is the eighth book in The Cat Who... mystery series by Lilian Jackson Braun, published in 1988.

== Plot summary ==
Pickax City is first disrupted by vandalism, then by murder. Harley Fitch, vice-president of the Pickax Bank, and his wife, Belle, are found shot to death, and vandals from neighboring Chipmunk are suspected. After three suspects die in a car accident, the case is closed. But Qwilleran does not agree.

In this book, Qwilleran meets Alacoque Wright, his former love interest from The Cat Who Ate Danish Modern. Offering her help to Qwilleran, she ironically refers to herself as "young, talented, friendly female" ("young, talented, friendly female wishes to apply").

== Reception ==
According to Publishers Weekly:

…this [is a] tame, nonmysterious mystery… When Harley Fitch [is murdered, Qwilleran] doesn't discover anything, except for the spotted pasts of the deceased. Eventually, the killer attacks Qwilleran and his identity is made known; there are no clues, no logical way for the reader to figure out whodunit. The author's device of introducing every scene with stage directions, and her reliance on stereotypical characters, may bore ….
