= The Cat Who Saw Red =

1986 novel by Lilian Jackson Braun

- Cover later than The Cat Who Tailed a Thief (1997), with first ed. illustration and design
- Author: Lilian Jackson Braun
- Language: English
- Series: The Cat Who...
- Genre: Mystery
- Publisher: Jove Books
- Publication date: April 1986
- Publication place: United States
- Media type: Print (paperback)
- Pages: 183
- ISBN: 0-515-08491-3
- OCLC: 53385501
- LC Class: CPB Box no. 1360 vol. 1
- Preceded by: The Cat Who Turned On and Off
- Followed by: The Cat Who Played Brahms

The Cat Who Saw Red is a mystery novel by Lilian Jackson Braun, published as a Jove Books paperback original in 1986. It is the fourth story in The Cat Who... series featuring journalist Jim Qwilleran and Siamese cat Koko, which it resumed eighteen years after a 1960s trilogy. Reissues of the first three stories were promoted on its back cover: "Watch for these other Lilian Jackson Braun mysteries:" (titles also beginning The Cat Who). 25 further sequels were published from 1987 to 2007.

The Cat Who Saw Red shares with the original trilogy its setting in a smaller city (not Chicago). Qwill first visits fictitious Moose County in the next volume and soon afterward moves there permanently.

== Plot ==
Newspaper reporter Jim Qwilleran, who once covered crime in the big city, is reassigned by The Daily Fluxion from interior decoration to food. He learns that he will be paid to eat at local restaurants while reading his doctor's assignment to a severe diet! For his first story, he decides to review Maus Haus, owned by Robert Maus. In addition to a restaurant, the architecturally peculiar historic building is also a boarding house. When Qwill discovers there is an open apartment, he promptly moves in with his two Siamese cats, Koko and Yum Yum.

Another resident of Maus Haus is Qwill's old girlfriend from Chicago, Joy Wheatley. She had learned that she has a knack for pottery and married a potter named Dan Graham. It soon becomes obvious that the relationship between Joy and Dan is strained, especially when they discuss how Joy's cat has gone missing; Joy is deeply troubled, but Dan jokes about it. Joy is a far more successful potter; Dan is missing one thumb, so he can only make roll pots, not as appealing as those spun on a wheel. One night she tells Qwill privately that she would divorce Dan if she could afford the court costs. Qwilleran decides to lend her $750, the last of the prize money he won for a series of news articles.

Later that night Qwilleran hears a scream, and then hears a car pull out of the garage and drive away. Next day, Dan claims that Joy has left him. He also explains the scream: Joy was working on an electric wheel and caught her hair in a pot. She was saved from scalping by Dan when he threw the switch, shutting the wheel off.

Days later, another Maus Haus resident mentions how well Joy threw pots on her manual, not electric, wheel. Qwilleran begins to suspect Joy is dead. Soon after, another mystery comes to his attention. Maus Haus resident Max Sorrel owns a restaurant called the Golden Lamb Chop which is suffering a spate of anonymous damaging rumors about how the meat is cat, that the chef has a terrible disease, and so on. With many customers scared off, the restaurant is near bankruptcy. So Qwilleran decides to review the Golden Lamp Chop; despite a threatening phone call advising him to write nothing about the Golden Lamb Chop, he files the review.

Dan gets a passport and says he will be go to Europe to display his pots. Qwilleran learns that the car that drove off after the scream in the night was Max Sorrel speeding off after learning his restaurant was on fire. The houseboy says Joy always used the kick wheel, and that "Mr. Graham was going to blow a whole load of pots" because he was heating the kiln too quickly. The houseboy had spied on Graham using a peephole cut in the wall of Qwill's room.

Next morning, the houseboy is nowhere to be found. Dan claims he has received a postcard from Joy in Florida, asking to have her summer clothes. Maus Haus resident Hixie Rice breaks off her engagement with Graham, as she does not want to be with a man cheating on his wife.

When Qwill peers through the houseboy's peephole, he sees Dan copying material from a ledger. To get a better look, Qwill claims that Fluxion wants a photo shoot of Dan's pottery; he brings Koko along to pose in some pictures, although he really wants the cat to sniff around for clues. Koko does show great interest in the trap door to the basement but Dan says they shouldn't go down, because there are rats. Later Qwill learns that Maus is very particular about sanitation and has an exterminator visit regularly. He also finds the ledger and discovers that it contains recipes for glazes used by Joy.

Stepping on Qwill's typewriter, Koko types 'pb', the chemical symbol for lead. Through the peephole, Qwill witnesses Dan burning Joy's clothing.

At the pottery opening, Dan surprises everyone with his "living glaze", which compensates for the poor quality of his pots. Many people say his glaze on Joy's pots would be very popular. After the housekeeper tells Qwill she saw someone dump a bag into the river, he asks a diver friend to look below the boardwalk behind Maus Haus. The diver reports that the bag contains Joy's pots with the living glaze. That night, Qwilleran reads a book on pottery, which provides the missing clues. He imagines his way through the affair:

- Dan, already envious of his wife's success, became very jealous of her living glazes.
- He (like Qwilleran) read that in ancient China, potters burned human bodies to create a powerful red glaze.
- Dan used Joy's cat, whom he dislikes, as a test, and finds that it works.
- Dan prevented any of Joy's pots from being displayed before the show, so no one will know she invented the living glaze.
- Dan murdered Joy, and used her ashes to create more red glazes. He then forged the post card saying that she was in Florida, and burned her clothing.
- So no one will know the living glaze was her idea, he threw her pots with the living glaze into the river.
- When he learned that the houseboy was becoming suspicious, Dan invited him for a drink and poisoned him with lead oxide, used in glazes. Because pots in the kiln were cooling, he had stored the houseboy's body in the basement; the smell of ripening clay from the basement clay room would disguise any other odors.
- Dan got a passport and tickets to France so he could flee the country.

Dan breaks into Qwill's apartment to kill him, but throughout the apartment Koko and Yum-Yum had spun a spider web from a yarn ball. Dan trips and falls; Qwilleran is alerted and Graham arrested. Charlotte Roop overhears two Heavenly Hash House managers discuss the failure of their attempts to put the Golden Lamb Chop out of business. They had hoped to purchase the property for their own business.

== Awards ==
The Cat Who Saw Red was nominated for both the 1987 Anthony Award and the Edgar award of the same year in the "Best Paperback Original" category. In both instances, the novel lost out to the Robert Wright Campbell novel, The Junkyard Dog.

== Reception ==
Publishers Weekly were commending of Braun's work and stated that "she offers here a delightful tale." Unlike her other book The Cat Who Ate Danish Modern which "occasionally verges on the cutesy."
