= Dorothy Cannell =

English-American mystery writer

- Born: 1943 (age 82–83); London, England
- Occupation: Novelist
- Spouse: Julian Cannell (m. 1964)
- Children: 4
- Writing career
- Language: English
- Genre: Mystery
- Notable work: Ellie Haskell series

Dorothy Cannell (born 1943) is an English-American mystery writer.

== Biography ==
Dorothy Cannell was born in London, England. She moved to the United States in 1963 at the age of 20. She married Julian Cannell in 1964 and they lived in Peoria, Illinois, for many years before moving to Belfast, Maine. She is a mother of four and a grandmother of ten.

== Bibliography ==
Cannell writes mysteries featuring Ellie Haskell, interior decorator, and Ben Haskell, writer and chef, and Hyacinth and Primrose Tramwell, a pair of dotty sisters and owners of the Flowers Detection Agency. Her first Ellie Haskell novel, The Thin Woman, was selected as one of the "100 Favorite Mysteries of the Twentieth Century" by the Independent Mystery Booksellers Association.

=== Ellie Haskell series ===
1. The Thin Woman (1984)
2. The Widow's Club (1988)
3. Mum's the Word (1990)
4. Femmes Fatal (1992)
5. How to Murder Your Mother-In-Law (1994)
6. How to Murder the Man of Your Dreams (1995)
7. The Spring Cleaning Murders (1998)
8. The Trouble with Harriet (1999)
9. Bridesmaids Revisited (2000)
10. The Importance of Being Ernestine (2002)
11. Withering Heights (2007)
12. Goodbye, Ms. Chips (2008)
13. She Shoots to Conquer (2009)

=== Other novels and collections ===
- Down The Garden Path (1985)
- God Save the Queen (1997)
- Naked Came The Farmer (1998)
- The Sunken Sailor (2004)
- Sea Glass Summer (2012)
- The Family Jewels and Other Stories (Collection, 2001)
- Murder at Mullings (2014)

Death at Dovecote Hatch (2015) Peril in the Parish (2022)

== Awards ==
Cannell's 1988 novel The Widows Club was nominated for the "Best Novel" award at the 1989 Anthony Awards and the Agatha Awards in the same year. She was also nominated for a "Best Short Story" Agatha Award in 1991, for "The High Cost of Living"; 1992, for "The January Sales Stowaway"; and 1996, for "Cupid's Arrow".

In 2014 Cannell received the Malice Domestic Award for Lifetime Achievement.
