= The Cat Who Lived High =

1990 novel by Lilian Jackson Braun

- First edition (h/b)
- Author: Lilian Jackson Braun
- Language: English
- Series: The Cat Who series
- Genre: Mystery
- Publisher: G. P. Putnam's Sons (h/b); Jove Books (p/b)
- Publication date: 1990
- Publication place: United States
- Media type: Print (hardback & paperback)
- Preceded by: The Cat Who Talked to Ghosts
- Followed by: The Cat Who Knew a Cardinal

The Cat Who Lived High is the 11th novel in The Cat Who series of murder mystery novels by Lilian Jackson Braun.

Jim Qwilleran receives a request for help from Amberina, one of the three weird sisters in Junktown, to come back and help save the historic Art Deco Casablanca apartment building from demolition by developers. Accordingly, Jim and the cats rent the penthouse, which turns out to be the scene of an apparent murder-suicide, involving the death of Dianne Bessinger, the head of the committee formed to prevent the demolition of the building. Jim and the cats discover that Dianne and her lover had been killed on the orders of those opposed to her campaign to prevent demolition of the Casablanca, and eventually uncover the killer's identity.
