= The Cat Who Went Underground =

1989 novel by Lilian Jackson Braun

- First edition (h/b)
- Author: Lilian Jackson Braun
- Language: English
- Series: The Cat Who series
- Genre: Mystery
- Publisher: G. P. Putnam's Sons (h/b); Jove Books (p/b)
- Publication date: 1989
- Publication place: United States
- Media type: Print (hardback & paperback)
- Pages: 288 pp
- ISBN: 0-515-10123-0
- OCLC: 20350901
- Preceded by: The Cat Who Sniffed Glue
- Followed by: The Cat Who Talked to Ghosts

The Cat Who Went Underground is the ninth novel in The Cat Who series of murder mystery novels by Lilian Jackson Braun.

== Synopsis ==
With Polly Duncan in England, Qwilleran realizes that Pickax is a bore in summer. So he decides to go to his cabin on the lakeshore in Mooseville. Shortly before Qwill arrives, Buddy Yarrow, a carpenter, drowns while fishing, but the police report it as an accident. When he arrives, Qwill discovers his heater is broken, so calls a nearby resident and friend, Mildred Hanstable. She suggests subscribing to "Glinko," a family "network" that "dispatches" people like plumbers, electricians and others for emergencies. The plumber "dispatched" is Joanna Trupp, known to many as Little Joe, who is the daughter of Big Joe, a carpenter who was recently killed in an accident. She makes many visits to fix broken plumbing equipment. Qwill is annoyed at the constant breakdowns and sometimes even suspects her of breaking things on purpose, but is never really sure. He decides to build an addition to his cabin but is advised against it, because during the summer, all the good contractors are busy with big jobs, so the people are forced to hire itinerant carpenters, or Underground Builders as they are referred to by the locals, who are unreliable.

But Qwilleran is lucky and finds out that Clem Cottle, a reliable and experienced carpenter, needs money and so could work for Qwill. He builds steps to the beach and begins on Qwill's addition, but goes missing shortly after. Despite the assurances by Clem's father that he is on a last fling before he marries, Qwill, Clem's mother, and Clem's soon-to-be wife do not believe that. One day while biking on an abandoned road used only by hunters (and Clem was not a hunter), Qwill finds Clem's truck abandoned in a ditch. So he reports Clem's disappearance and begins to look for a replacement. When Clem went missing, Koko began tapping his tail three times, similar to the way Clem hammered nails.

Eventually, Qwilleran resorts to an underground builder by the name of Iggy. He is lazy, has nicotine addiction, and very large teeth. After doing a few days of work, in which little progress is made, he goes missing, only to reappear a few days later. That day Qwilleran and two friends go on a trip to Three Tree Island, a small island in the middle of the lake with a small shack, a dock, and three trees. John Bushland and Roger MacGillivray are looking for the scorched sand a helicopter pilot said he saw. They believe it was left by UFOs, or visitors as they are referred by the locals, but Qwill is skeptical of such things and does not expect to find anything. After a squall hits, the men become stranded on the island and are later rescued after a harrowing experience and taken to the Pickax hospital. He is released the next day and arrives home to find Iggy's truck is parked in the drive, but the carpenter is nowhere to be found.

Koko then begins to paw excitedly at the trap door to the crawlspace under the cabin, which is where all the pipes and electrical wires enter the house, and Qwill lets Koko in. Koko had recently shown a great interest in the trap door, and to try to convince Koko there's no reason to go down, Qwilleran closes the door behind him, and goes to lunch. When he returns, Yum Yum shows she is worried about Koko and so he goes down to get Koko. But Qwilleran finds Koko digging, and helps him uncover Iggy's dead body.

The discovery of this death begins to convince Qwilleran that something is happening to carpenters that are causing their demise. He reads some papers of Emma Wimsey, an old woman who was interviewed by Qwilleran for the Qwill Pen and was so delighted she gave him some of her old papers and discovered that Little Joe was Emma's granddaughter and had had a troubled life. Her mother married Big Joe and lived a terrible life. She and her children were poor, didn't have proper clothes, and were abused by their father. This was so terrible that Joanna’s younger sister shot herself. Qwilleran rides out to her house to give her the papers but finds it flooded by the rain that came with the storm that marooned Qwill on the island. But her truck is not there so he assumes she got away safely. But while he is there, he finds Clem Cottle’s jacket.

Qwill learns that the local riff-raff believe he is responsible for Iggy's death. Also, a policeman overheard him discussing how frustrating it was to have an underground builder, and even his statement, "I could clobber him with a two-by-four..." The police mention this during a second questioning, but then the phone rings and the cats act as though it scared them (though the telephone had never scared them before), and the police leave without getting an answer to that particular question. Nick Bamba, a friend of Qwilleran's who is an engineer at the state prison, says he heard about some nasty rumors about Qwilleran and says he will stay with Qwill that night, with his camper blocking the entrance, a shotgun, a rifle, and the sheriff alerted. Early in the morning, Koko begins acting the way he did when he uncovered Iggy's body. Qwilleran lets the cat down and he leads them to a list of names of carpenters who had died recently, written in the lipstick used by Little Joe.

Qwill calls Glinko and fakes an emergency so that Little Joe comes. He then confronts her with the murder of her father, which she had rigged so it appeared to be an accident; Buddy Yarrow, who was fishing on her property; Mert, another underground builder who went missing and was never seen again; Clem Cottle; and Iggy, whose real name is Ignatius K. Small. She says simply that Louise did the killings and then ran off. Qwill calls the police and Little Joe is arrested. Qwilleran suspects that she has multiple personalities and “Louise” is the other personality Joanna uses when she kills carpenters.

== Versions ==
- United States: Jove publishers; 1989; ISBN 0-515-10123-0 & Putnam; 1989; 0-399-13431-X
- U.K.: Headline Publishing Group; ISBN 0-7472-5039-1
- Large Print Edition: G. K. Hall Large Print Book Series; ISBN 0-8161-4941-0
- Book on Tape: Recorded Books; 1993; Read by George Guidall ISBN 0-7887-5491-2
