= If I'd Killed Him When I Met Him =

1995 novel by Sharyn McCrumb

- Author: Sharyn McCrumb
- Language: English
- Genre: Detective
- Publisher: Ballantine Books
- Publication date: June 1995
- Publication place: United States
- Pages: 277
- ISBN: 978-0-345-38229-0

If I'd Killed Him When I Met Him (stylized with trailing ellipsis) is a 1995 detective novel by American author Sharyn McCrumb. It is the eighth book in the Elizabeth MacPherson series, following the titular character investigating multiple murder cases of wives on husbands. It received positive reviews and won an Agatha Award for best novel in 1995.

== Plot ==
The story follows a forensic anthropologist, Elizabeth MacPherson, who is working for a law firm operated by her brother, Bill. She goes to Danville, Virginia, to investigate a case of a preacher, Chevry Morgan, who recently died of arsenic poisoning after his affair with a 16-year-old girl, with his previous wife, Donna Jean Morgan the prime suspect. Another lawyer, Amy Powell Hill, is defending another woman, Eleanor Royden, who readily admits to murdering her ex-husband, and the woman he cheated on her with, using a pistol. Meanwhile, an animal rights activist named Miri Malone is attempting to legally marry a dolphin. In the process of dealing with these cases, MacPherson also investigates a 19th-century murder case of a southern woman who was presumed to have murdered her New Yorker husband, who Donna Morgan is descended from.

=== Title ===
The titular quote, "If I'd killed him when I met him...", is completed by a character in a statement of "... I'd be out of jail by now."

== Publication history ==
If I'd Killed Him When I Met Him was published on June 5, 1995, by Ballantine Books. It was the eighth work of Sharyn McCrumb to feature the character of Elizabeth MacPherson. A sequel, The PMS Outlaws, was released in 2000.

== Reception ==
If I'd Killed Him When I Met Him received generally positive reviews. It received critical praise for its humor and wit as well as its mystery and intrigue writing. San Francisco Chronicle reviewer Claudia Conlon praised its "spicy dialogue and eccentric characters", although she also noted that many of the characters had "the same racy humor", even when it wouldn't make sense for them to. It was frequently noted to be an entertaining depiction of a "battle of the sexes" scenario. McClatchy News Service reviewer Bill Peschel praised it for its highs in both comedy and tragedy, while telling multiple separate stories in a relatively short novel. It won the Agatha Award for Best Novel in 1995.
