= Ross Macdonald Literary Award =

The Ross Macdonald Literary Award is a U.S. book prize given each year by the Santa Barbara Book Council to "a California writer whose work raises the standard of literary excellence." The award is named in honor of California mystery novelist Ross Macdonald, whose novels were set in a fictionalized version of Santa Barbara, California.

== Past award recipients ==
Year	Honoree
2002	Ray Bradbury
2003	Dean Koontz
2004	Sue Grafton
2005	Mark Salzman
2006	Robert Crais
2007	T. C. Boyle
2008	James Ellroy
2016	Dennis Lynds
2017	Fannie Flagg
2018	Pico Iyer
