= The Cat Who Had 60 Whiskers =

2007 novel by Lilian Jackson Braun

- First edition cover
- Author: Lilian Jackson Braun
- Language: English
- Series: The Cat Who series
- Genre: Mystery, crime
- Publisher: Putnam Adult
- Publication date: January 2, 2007
- Publication place: United States
- Media type: Print (paperback)
- Pages: 208 pp
- ISBN: 0-399-15390-X
- OCLC: 76074326
- Dewey Decimal: 813/.54 22
- LC Class: PS3552.R354 C3365 2007b
- Preceded by: The Cat Who Dropped a Bombshell
- Followed by: TBA

The Cat Who Had 60 Whiskers is the 29th book in The Cat Who series. It was released in 2007 and is written by Lilian Jackson Braun.

== Plot introduction ==
The Old Hulk, being developed for a senior center, mysteriously burns to the ground. Meanwhile, a young woman dies from a bee sting—or could it have been murder? Qwill's lady friend, Polly Duncan, goes to Paris and decides to stay there. Later, Qwill's apple barn residence is burned by fire.

== Reception ==
The author, Lilian Jackson Braun, died June 4, 2011, making The Cat Who Had 60 Whiskers her final book.

Sally Estes, of Booklist reviewed the book saying, "A welcome chance to revisit Moose County for regulars, but don't expect passer-by to stick around. Dave Roy, of Curled Up, reviewed the book saying, "Give The Cat Who Had 60 Whiskers a miss, because it's something the cat hacked up." Marge Fletcher, of Book Reporter reviewed the book saying, "Throughout the book, on the lefthand side of certain new paragraphs, there are drawings of a cat paw. These serve to remind the audience that Koko and Yum Yum are the real stars of the series, as they provide an interesting and creative leitmotif for the reader's enjoyment".
