= David Stout =

American journalist and author (1942–2020)

- Born: May 13, 1942; Erie, Pennsylvania, U.S.
- Died: February 11, 2020 (aged 77); Washington, DC, U.S.
- Occupations: Author, journalist
- Writing career
- Subject: Crime
- Notable works: Carolina Skeletons; The Boy in the Box
- Notable awards: Edgar Allan Poe Award for Best First Novel – 1989

David Stout (May 13, 1942 – February 11, 2020) was a journalist and author of mystery novels, two of which have been turned into TV movies, and of non-fiction about violent crime. For his first novel, Carolina Skeletons, he won the Edgar Allan Poe Award for Best First Novel.

== Career as journalist ==
Stout obtained a bachelor's degree in English from the University of Notre Dame in 1964, and a master's in English literature from Buffalo State College in 1970. His early work as journalist was for The Erie Daily Times, The Buffalo Evening News, and The Record of Hackensack in northern New Jersey.

In 1982, Stout went to work for The New York Times, where he continued to work both as reporter and editor. In 1997 he moved to their Washington office and became a night rewrite man, i.e. working mainly in the office and turning information and texts received from others into articles. After 2000, Stout worked mainly for the paper's website, again including work as rewrite man. Throughout his career, Stout's responsibilities had also covered sports and domestic news. After 27.5 years with The New York Times, editor Stout took advantage of a buy-out offer in 2009 and left the newspaper. He stated he was "leaving with very warm feelings for the [New York Times]." By February 2010, the online archive of The New York Times listed 1425 articles by Stout.

== Career as author ==
Since the late 1980s, Stout has published four books about fictional and non-fictional violent crime cases. In 2003, a short note in a New York Times article about one of Stout's books described Stout's perspective on "violent crime [to be] unsentimental" and suggested that his approach may be shaped by "his own motives and his own demons from the strangling murder of an aunt.

=== 1988-1993: Novels ===
For his first novel Carolina Skeletons, published in 1988, Stout received the Edgar Allan Poe Award for "Best First Novel". It was also nominated for the 1989 Anthony Award in the same category. The book is based on the true story of the 1944 murder of two girls in South Carolina, for which the 14-year-old African-American boy George Stinney was later charged and executed on the electric chair, becoming the youngest child ever killed through capital punishment in the United States. Stout used the controversies surrounding Stinney's guilt and trial for a mystery story. A little less than the first half of the book is based on the facts although changing the name from George Stinney to Linius Bragg. The remainder of the book is fictional and tells the story how a nephew of the convicted unravels the truth some 40 years later. The book tells about still prevailing racial prejudice in the South, but also about Southerners—including police officers—honestly trying to uncover the truth. The New York Times, one of whose editors Stout was at the time of the book's publication, described the "ending of Carolina Skeletons" as "somewhat pat," but praised the novel generally as "sensitive, well-written" and "full of compassion and understanding. It is a plea for people of different ethnic and social backgrounds to understand one another and come together. The theme is sorrow and pity, not vengeance."

The novel was turned into the 1991 made-for-TV movie which aired on NBC Carolina Skeletons (alternative title: The End of Silence), directed by John Erman and starring Louis Gossett Jr. The movie made some changes to the book's plot, e.g., turning Gossett's character, who returns to his hometown to find out the truth about the crime, into the brother instead of the nephew of the executed boy. The boy himself was portrayed by Kenn Michael, who was nominated for a Young Artist Award for Best Young Actor in a Television Movie for the role in 1993.

Stout's next novel was Night of the Ice Storm (1991), a fictional whodunit about a journalist solving a murder, which had remained unsolved for some 20 years. The New York Times critic Marilyn Stasio called the novel "coolly terrifying" and the plot "killingly suspenseful." She compared the novel to Carolina Skeletons in the way Stout "expertly works the genre format on more than one level," reaching "into the psychology of grown-up children tortured by unresolved love-hate relationships" and developing the story into a thriller which is "even more haunting as a fathers-and-sons drama." Moreover, finds Stasio, the story can also be read as a "regional novel" about the fictional upstate New York town of Bessemer with its wealthy steel-and-coal past, which has now become "a symbol of stagnation for those who must decide whether to stay or leave."

In 1993, The Dog Hermit followed: Set again against a (Thanksgiving) winter storm in a fictitious upstate New York community that had once seen better times, and starring again a journalist becoming interested in a crime, the plot evolves this time around a kidnapping case, whose young victim is abandoned to die in the forests around the rural place of Long Creek. New York Times critic Stasio praised Stout's "clean and direct [writing] style," with which he conjured "the vivid scenes of suspense he's after." Stasio also highlighted that the story offered again more than "only" a mystery plot: "Less showy, but just as sturdy, are [Stout's] sensitive observations on the absent fathers, lost children and forsaken values that go with the territory of bleak towns like Long Creek."

The novel The Dog Hermit was turned into a 1995 TV movie under the title A Child Is Missing. Directed by the TV movie and series director John Power, the cast included Henry Winkler, Roma Downey, and Dale Midkiff.

=== Since 2003: Non-fiction ===
A few years later, Stout turned to writing non-fiction books and published Night of the Devil: The Untold Story of Thomas Trantino and the Angel Lounge Killings (2003) about the murder of two policemen in New Jersey. (The phrase "Night of the Devil" had already been linked to the crime in 1981, when it was used as title for a documentary about the Trantino case.) Trantino was sentenced to death for the killings, but never executed due to the 1972 suspension of capital punishment in the United States. Trantino became a "model prisoner," but his release on parole was delayed due to opposition from police, politicians, and people close to the victims. New York Times critic Charles Salzberg praised the book for not "taking sides or moralizing about the death penalty," but instead providing an "evenhanded, well-researched account of the legal machinations that kept Trantino a prisoner, as well as a fair and sympathetic portrait of the families of the victims, who still suffer the effects of that night at the [crime scene]."

Stout's publication, The Boy in the Box: The Unsolved Case of America's Unknown Child (2008), tells the story of the unsolved death of Joseph Augustus Zarelli, known until 2022 only as "the Boy in the Box" and "America's Unknown Child", a young, then-unidentified boy found in Philadelphia on 25 February 1957. Stout had already published an article in The New York Times about the crime at the beginning of 2007, the year of the 50th anniversary of the discovery of Zarelli's body.

From the mid-1970s to mid-1980s, Stout was a resident of Englewood, New Jersey, where he lived near the former home of Dwight Morrow, the father-in-law of Charles Lindbergh. The Lindbergh baby kidnapping was one of the subjects of his 2020 book, The Kidnap Years: The Astonishing True History of the Forgotten Kidnapping Epidemic That Shook Depression-Era America.

Stout died on 11 February 2020 from complications of esophageal cancer.

== Published books ==
- Carolina Skeletons (1988) – novel, based on a true story
- Night of the Ice Storm (1991) – novel
- The Dog Hermit (1993) – novel
- Night of the Devil: The Untold Story of Thomas Trantino and the Angel Lounge Killings (2003) – non-fiction
- The Boy in the Box: The Unsolved Case of America's Unknown Child (2008) – non-fiction
- The Kidnap Years: The Astonishing True History of the Forgotten Kidnapping Epidemic That Shook Depression-Era America (2020) – non-fiction
