= The Cat Who Brought Down the House =

2003 novel by Lilian Jackson Braun

- First edition cover
- Author: Lilian Jackson Braun
- Publisher: G. P. Putnam's Sons
- Publication date: January 6, 2003
- ISBN: 0-399-14942-2

The Cat Who Brought Down the House (2003) is the 25th novel in The Cat Who series written by American writer Lilian Jackson Braun.

== Plot introduction ==
A native of Moose County, Thelma Thackeray, is returning to die. She is 82, has fame and fortune, and owns a vacant opera house downtown. She wants to have fun before she dies. Everyone is curious about her. Local historians say that her twin brother, Thurston, had died from an accidental fall near Lockmaster. His son, Richard, has now moved in with Thelma. When Thelma decides to turn the opera house into a film club, Dick is offered the job of manager. The first public event is a fund-raiser, with wealthy citizens and their cats. That is when Koko brings down the house.

== Reception ==
Peter Cannon of Publishers Weekly reviewed the book saying, "In her inimitable gentle style, Braun documents the daily activities of the inhabitants of Pickax. Kidnappings, robberies and murders may abound, but nothing is really upsetting or unpleasant. Braun devotees will cheer." A Kirkus Reviews review says, "The smidgen of mystery will be just enough for the faithful already queued up for this mild silver anniversary for Braun." Rex E. Klett of Library Journal reviewed the book saying, "For all of those cat aficionados out there, here is more quaint, small-town goings-on."

Booklist also reviewed the novel. Booklist and Publishers Weekly reviewed the audiobook narrated by George Guidall.
