= Bouchercon XVIII =

1987 mystery and detective fiction convention

- "Murder in the North Country"
- Date: October 9, 1987
- Location: Minneapolis, Minnesota
- Country: USA
- Hosted by: Steven A. Stilwell & Becky A. Reineke

Bouchercon is an annual convention of creators and devotees of mystery and detective fiction. It is named in honour of writer, reviewer, and editor Anthony Boucher; also the inspiration for the Anthony Awards, which have been issued at the convention since 1986. This page details Bouchercon XVIII and the 2nd Anthony Awards ceremony.

== Bouchercon ==
The convention was held in Minneapolis, Minnesota on October 9, 1987; running for two days until the 11th. The event was chaired by authors Steven A. Stilwell and Becky A. Reineke.

=== Special Guests ===
- Guest of Honor — Lawrence Block
- Fan Guest of Honor — John Nieminski (posthumously)
- Toastmasters — Mary S. Craig & Max Allan Collins

== Anthony Awards ==
The following list details the awards distributed at the second annual Anthony Awards ceremony.

=== Novel award ===
Winner:

- Sue Grafton, "C" is for Corpse

Shortlist:

- Lawrence Block, When the Sacred Ginmill Closes
- John Lutz, Tropical Heat
- Nancy Pickard, No Body
- Jonathan Valin, Life's Work

=== First novel award ===
Winner:

- Bill Crider, Too Late to Die

Shortlist:

- Joan Hess, Strangled Prose
- Faye Kellerman, The Ritual Bath
- Joseph Koenig, Floater
- Mike Lupica, Dead Air

=== Paperback original award ===
Winner:

- Robert Wright Campbell, The Junkyard Dog

Shortlist:

- Lilian Jackson Braun, The Cat Who Saw Red
- J.A. Jance, Trial By Fury
- Rob Kantner, The Back-Door Man
- Warren Murphy, Trace: Too Old a Cat

=== Short story award ===
Winner:

- Sue Grafton, "The Parker Shotgun", from Mean streets: The Second Private Eye Writers of America Anthology

Shortlist:

- Wayne D. Dundee, "Body Count", from Mean streets: The Second Private Eye Writers of America Anthology
- Clark Howard, "Scalplock", from Ellery Queen's Mystery Magazine July 1986
