= The Cat Who Could Read Backwards =

Novel by Lilian Jackson Braun

- First edition, 1966
- Author: Lilian Jackson Braun
- Language: English
- Series: The Cat Who...
- Genre: Mystery, Novel
- Publisher: E. P. Dutton
- Publication date: 1966
- Publication place: United States
- Media type: Print (Hardback & Paperback)
- Pages: 256 pp (Jove pb, 2007)
- ISBN: 0-515-14408-8 (Jove pb, 2007)
- OCLC: 154688712
- Followed by: The Cat Who Ate Danish Modern

The Cat Who Could Read Backwards is the first novel in Lilian Jackson Braun's The Cat Who... series, published in 1966. The book introduces the main character, former crime reporter James Qwilleran, who starts to look after a Siamese cat named Koko, who is literate.

== Plot introduction ==
In the first book of the series, the reader is introduced to James Mackintosh Qwilleran (Qwill), a former crime reporter turned newsman on The Daily Fluxion. His first assignment is the art beat where he meets a rather eccentric – and not very well-liked – art critic whom he befriends. He also meets the critic's cat, a Siamese named Kao K'o-Kung, Koko for short.

== Plot summary ==
Jim Qwilleran is attempting to get his life back on track, starting with a new job; his old acquaintance, Arch Riker, is taking a chance. Qwilleran became known as a journalist for covering crime, but his new job at the Flux is hardly so glamorous: he's working on the art beat. The paper's resident art critic is the reclusive and decidedly unpopular one-handed man named George Bonifield Mountclemens III. Qwill visits Mountclemens and meets Koko, a male Siamese cat who appears to be able to read, but only backwards. Qwilleran rents a room from Mountclemens and starts to take care of Koko, who has rather delicate taste in eating.

Mountclemens adores some local artists and despises others. One of the former is a young woman, Zoe Lambreth, whose husband owns the Lambreth Gallery, which showcases her works among others, including Scrano, and Zoe's protégé, Nino. Mountclemens has an argument with Noel Farhar, the director of an art museum; the museum lost a million-dollar deal after a bad review from Mountclemens, and as a result Farhar is retiring.

One evening, Qwill is relaxing in the Press Club with his friend, the Flux photographer Odd Bunsen, when Bunsen is paged: there's been a murder at the Lambreth Gallery. Specifically, it's the owner, Earl Lambreth, and the gallery was left in disarray, with paintings destroyed and furniture tossed about. Qwill notices that a Ghirotto painting, or rather half of one, is missing; intact, the painting of a ballerina and monkey would be worth $150,000, but Lambreth's half, the ballerina, has disappeared.

Qwill attempts to comfort the attractive widow Lambreth, who is being protected and cared for by a friend named Butchy, also an artist and a teacher. A dagger goes missing from the art museum. Mountclemens, just returned from a trip, does not seem very interested in Earl's death.

As an art writer, Qwill goes to a "happening" featuring Nino. Nino's creations are made from things that people throw away, things that have meaning to him that others may not necessarily understand. The show ends disastrously, when one of Nino's creations is knocked from its scaffolding, and Nino falls to his death attempting to save it.

Qwill has more theories than real sympathy for the recently deceased. Nino didn't like Earl Lambreth. Butchy didn't like the friendship between Zoe and Nino. Could Butchy have pushed Nino to his death? Meanwhile, the dagger and the Ghirotto are both found. Defeated in possible conspiracy theories, Qwill returns home to Koko. Koko leads Qwill upstairs to Mountclemens' flat, where they find Mountclemens lying dead at the bottom of his fire escape.

Qwill continues to take care of the Siamese, and the next day, Koko leads him upstairs to retrieve his blue cushion and his favorite "mousie" toy, nicknamed Minty Mouse. In the course of searching for the Minty Mouse, Qwill finds Mountclemens' stash of paintings, which includes a half-painting of a monkey. It is the match to the Ghirotto ballerina that Earl Lambreth owned. Mountclemens had offered to buy Earl's half from him, not letting on that he owned the other half. However, Earl had something else Mountclemens wanted, or rather someone—Zoe had been leading the critic on by flirting with him in order to stay in his good graces. Mountclemens might have killed Earl, but his name is on the airline's list of passengers, and Qwill believes this proves he was out of town. Zoe interrupts Qwill's contemplation, and he invites her to the Press Club for lunch.

At the Press Club, Zoe gives credence to Qwill's theories. She tells him Mountclemens owned the Lambreth Gallery, and Earl had been maintaining two sets of books, one real and one falsified. Earl had threatened to expose Mountclemens in order to stop his relationship with Zoe. This would have put Mountclemens in jail. Zoe believes Mountclemens killed Earl, and had someone fly under his name to provide himself with an alibi.

Returning to the apartment, Qwill is in a quiet mood. Could Zoe have killed Mountclemens? She didn't seem unhappy to see the art critic dead. Koko leads Qwill to the old apartment again, where he knocks a knife off the counter. In the broom closet is a flashlight, but why wasn't there one by Mountclemens' body? Unless in being one handed, Mountclemens chose a knife over a flashlight? Yet he wasn't wearing his false hand, and the art critic was vain enough to wear it if he had an assignation with Zoe.

Koko growls at the door of the abandoned studio, and Qwill enters to find that several of the paintings have vanished, and the remaining ones are highly valuable Scranos. As Koko runs his nose over the signature backwards (ONARCS), the painter Qwill knew as Narx—but readers had never previously been introduced too—entered. Narx reached for the knife lying on the table, but Koko deflects his attack by leaping upon him and Qwill hits Narx with the flashlight.

Back at the Press Club, Qwill recounted the adventure, pointing out that Narx drew robotic drawings that resembled himself, and was clearly also O. Narx since the paintings' texture was so similar. Koko's reading the signature backwards merely confirmed this. Though Mountclemens could no longer paint or draw when he lost his hand, he could still instruct others, and Scrano had painted for him. In the art critic's last review, he said there would be no more art coming from Scrano which led Qwill to think that Mountclemens had intended on killing him, but Narx killed Mountclemens.

Once Scrano woke up, he confirmed Qwill's story. Qwill had, however, guessed wrong about Butchy and Zoe. Butchy had tried to save Nino and hurt herself in the process. Zoe had had murderous intent but never followed up on it. Upon his return to the apartment, Qwill asked Koko: Had it been all a coincidence, when Koko led him up to the closet with the monkey painting was it simply for a lost toy? Koko gave the man no answers, just removed an itch with a hind paw and a contented look.

== Reception ==
When the book was re-issued 30 years after its debut, Publishers Weekly said, "Braun's witty investigation of the 1960s art scene is as entertaining as her depiction of crusty Qwill's growing admiration for Koko's extraordinary talents."
