= The Watchman (Crais novel) =

2007 novel by Robert Crais

- First edition
- Author: Robert Crais
- Language: English
- Series: Elvis Cole series
- Genre: Detective fiction
- Publisher: Bantam
- Publication date: 2007
- Publication place: United States
- Media type: Print (Paperback)
- Pages: 304 pp (1st edition)
- ISBN: 0-7432-8163-2
- OCLC: 76481559
- Dewey Decimal: 813/.54 22
- LC Class: PS3553.R264 W38 2007
- Preceded by: The Forgotten Man
- Followed by: Chasing Darkness

The Watchman is a 2007 detective novel by Robert Crais. It is the eleventh in a series of linked novels centering on private investigator Elvis Cole and his partner Joe Pike.

== Awards ==
The novel won the Barry Award for the Best Thriller of 2007 and the Mystery Ink Gumshoe Award for the Best Thriller of 2007; and was nominated for both the 2007 Anthony Award for "Best Novel" and the International Thriller Writers Thriller Award.
