= Les Roberts (author) =

American screenwriter and novelist

Les Roberts (born July 18, 1937) is an American screenwriter and mystery novelist.

== Early life and education ==
Roberts was born Lester Roubert, to Lester Nathaniel and Eleanor (Bauch) Roubert in Chicago, Illinois. He changed his name to Roberts in 1968.

He attended the University of Illinois at Champaign-Urbana and Roosevelt University from 1954 to 1956. Roberts served in the United States Army from 1960 to 1962.

== Writing career ==
Roberts began his career as a contemporary American mystery novelist after twenty-four years in Hollywood, having written and/or produced more than 2,500 half-hour segments of network and syndicated television. He was the first producer and head writer of The Hollywood Squares, and has written for The Lucy Show, The Andy Griffith Show, The Jackie Gleason Show and The Man from U.N.C.L.E., among others.

Roberts is primarily seen as a regional writer. Though his Saxon series is set in Los Angeles, he is best known for his Milan Jacovich series set in his adopted hometown of Cleveland, Ohio. Jacovich, unlike many single, dashing private eyes of fiction, is a battered, Stroh's-drinking, polka-dancing Slovenian American Vietnam veteran, ex-cop, and former Kent State football star, with a Serbian strong-willed ex-wife and two sons that he sees every other Sunday. Jacovich's working-guy attitude has endeared him to many Cleveland readers.

He is past president of the Private Eye Writers of America and the regular mystery book critic for The Plain Dealer. He has been a professional actor, singer, businessman, teacher and jazz musician.

== Social views ==
Roberts became a vegan c. 2012 after watching 'Peaceable Kingdom: The Journey Home' stating:

Humane slaughter is a bit of misnomer. Chicken, cows, pigs. They are all intelligent, sentient, emotional creatures and we treat them like we would an old pair of shoes. How could we ever eat animals again after that?

=== Bibliography ===
==== The Saxon series ====
- An Infinite Number Of Monkeys (1987 ISBN 978-1-930916-30-2)
- Not Enough Horses (1988 ISBN 978-1-930916-32-6)
- A Carrot For The Donkey (1989 ISBN 978-0-312-02554-0)
- Snake Oil (1990 ISBN 978-0-312-04424-4)
- Seeing The Elephant (1992 ISBN 978-1-930916-33-3)
- The Lemon Chicken Jones (1994 ISBN 978-0-312-10490-0)

==== The Milan Jacovich series ====
- Pepper Pike (1988: ISBN 978-1-59851-001-0)
- Full Cleveland (1989 ISBN 978-1-59851-002-7)
- Deep Shaker (1991 ISBN 978-1-59851-003-4)
- The Cleveland Connection (1993 ISBN 978-1-59851-004-1)
- The Lake Effect (1994 ISBN 978-1-59851-005-8)
- The Duke Of Cleveland (1995 ISBN 978-1-59851-006-5)
- Collision Bend (1996 ISBN 978-1-59851-007-2)
- The Cleveland Local (1997 ISBN 978-1-59851-008-9)
- A Shoot In Cleveland (1998 ISBN 978-1-59851-009-6)
- The Best-Kept Secret (1999 ISBN 978-1-59851-010-2)
- The Indian Sign (2000 ISBN 978-1-59851-011-9)
- The Dutch (2001 ISBN 978-1-59851-012-6)
- The Irish Sports Pages (2002 ISBN 978-1-59851-013-3)
- King of the Holly Hop (2008 ISBN 978-1-59851-054-6)
- The Cleveland Creep (2011 ISBN 978-1-59851-071-3)
- Whiskey Island (2012 ISBN 978-1-93844-139-4)
- Win, Place, or Die (with co-author Dan S. Kennedy) (2013 ISBN 978-1-93844-137-0)
- The Ashtabula Hat Trick (2015 ISBN 978-1-938441-71-4)
- Speaking of Murder (with co-author Dan S. Kennedy) (2016 ISBN 978-1-938441-84-4)

==== Other ====
- A Carol for Cleveland (1991 ISBN 0-944125-18-2)
- The Chinese Fire Drill (2001 ISBN 978-0-7862-3760-9)
- The Scent of Spiced Oranges and Other Stories (2002 ISBN 978-0-7862-4331-0)
- We'll Always Have Cleveland (2006 ISBN 978-1-59851-014-0)
- The Strange Death of Father Candy (Dominick Candiotti #1) (2011 ISBN 978-0-31256-633-3)
- Wet Work (Dominick Candiotti #2) (2014 ISBN 978-1938441547)
- Sheehan's Dog (2022 ISBN 9781643962474)

=== Awards ===
In 1986 he won the inaugural "Best First Private Eye Novel Contest" for An Infinite Number of Monkeys in 1986. This novel was also nominated for the 1988 Anthony Award for "Best First Novel" and the Shamus Award the same year in the same category. The following year, the initial novel in the Milan Jacovich series was nominated for the 1989 Anthony Award in the "Best Novel" category. Next, Roberts also won the 1992 Cleveland Arts Prize for Literature and has been voted "Cleveland's Favorite Author" by Cleveland.com. The novel The Lake Effect was nominated for the 1995 Shamus Award in the "Best Private Eye Novel" category.
