= Bouchercon XIX =

1988 mystery and detective fiction convention

- "Murder Sunny Side Up"
- Date: October 7, 1988
- Location: San Diego, California
- Country: USA
- Hosted by: Phyllis Brown & Ray Hardy

Bouchercon is an annual convention of creators and devotees of mystery and detective fiction. It is named in honour of writer, reviewer, and editor Anthony Boucher; also the inspiration for the Anthony Awards, which have been issued at the convention since 1986. This page details Bouchercon XIX and the 3rd Anthony Awards ceremony.

== Bouchercon ==
The convention was held in San Diego, California on October 7, 1988; running until the 9th. The event was chaired by Phyllis Brown, of local mystery bookshop "Grounds For Murder", and Ray Hardy.

=== Special Guests ===
- Guest of Honor — Charlotte MacLeod
- Fan Guest of Honor — Bruce Taylor
- Toastmaster — Robert Barnard

== Anthony Awards ==
The following list details the awards distributed at the third annual Anthony Awards ceremony.

=== Novel award ===
Winner:

- Tony Hillerman, Skinwalkers

Shortlist:

- Linda Barnes, A Trouble of Fools
- Aaron Elkins, Old Bones
- Elizabeth Peters, Trojan Gold
- Nancy Pickard, Marriage is Murder

=== First novel award ===
Winner:

- Gillian Roberts, Caught Dead in Philadelphia

Shortlist:

- Michael Allegretto, Death on the Rocks
- Robert J. Bowman, The House of Blue Lights
- Mary Monica Pulver, Murder at the War: A Modern-Day Mystery With a Medieval Setting
- Les Roberts, An Infinite Number of Monkeys

=== Paperback original award ===
Winner:

- Robert Crais, The Monkey's Raincoat

Shortlist:

- Lilian Jackson Braun, The Cat Who Played Brahms
- Carolyn G. Hart, Death on Demand
- Conrad Haynes, Bishop's Gambit, Declined
- Lia Matera, Where Lawyers Fear to Tread
- Sharyn McCrumb, Bimbos of the Death Sun

=== Short story award ===
Winner:

- Robert Barnard, "Breakfast Television", from Ellery Queen's Mystery Magazine January 1987

Shortlist:

- Max Allan Collins, "Scrap", from The Black Lizard Anthology of Crime Fiction
- Harlan Ellison, "Soft Monkey", from Mystery Scene Reader: A Special Tribute to John D. MacDonald
- Ed Gorman, "Turn Away", from The Black Lizard Anthology of Crime Fiction
- Joyce Harrington, "The Au Pair Girl", from A Matter Of Crime

=== Movie award ===
Winner:

- The Big Easy

Shortlist:

- Black Widow
- Fatal Attraction
- No Way Out
- RoboCop
- Stakeout

=== Television series award ===
Winner:

- Mystery!

Shortlist:

- The Equalizer
- Murder She Wrote
- Private Eye
- Wiseguy
