= The Cat Who Knew Shakespeare =

1988 novel by Lilian Jackson Braun

- Author: Lilian Jackson Braun
- Language: English
- Series: The Cat Who series
- Genre: Mystery
- Publisher: Jove
- Publication date: June 1, 1988
- Publication place: United States
- Media type: Print (hardback & paperback)
- Pages: 256
- ISBN: 0-515-09582-6
- OCLC: 18043172
- Preceded by: The Cat Who Played Post Office
- Followed by: The Cat Who Sniffed Glue

The Cat Who Knew Shakespeare is the seventh book in The Cat Who series by Lilian Jackson Braun, published in 1988.

== Plot summary ==
Jim Qwilleran, a newspaperman, and his Siamese cats, Koko and Yum Yum, enjoy his inherited wealth in Moose County, Michigan, particularly in its county seat, Pickax City. Qwilleran investigates a mysterious accidental death of a newspaper publisher with the help of his cats, who communicate with him by knocking various Shakespeare plays from his shelf. This is also the first appearance of Polly Duncan, who becomes Qwill's long time romantic interest.
