= The Cat Who Turned On and Off =

1968 novel by Lilian Jackson Braun

- First edition (US)
- Author: Lilian Jackson Braun
- Language: English
- Series: The Cat Who series
- Genre: Mystery
- Publisher: Collins Crime Club (UK)
- Publication date: 1968
- Publication place: United States
- Media type: Print (hardback & paperback)
- Pages: 192 pp
- ISBN: 0-00-231116-X
- Preceded by: The Cat Who Ate Danish Modern
- Followed by: The Cat Who Saw Red

The Cat Who Turned On and Off is the third novel in a series of murder mystery novels by Lilian Jackson Braun.

== Plot introduction ==
Qwill and his two lovable Siamese, Koko and Yum Yum find themselves in a rundown section of the city known as Junktown. Expecting it to be a haven of dopers and the homeless, they are surprised to see that it is a collection of old antique stores trying to survive. They also find mystery and murder waiting for them. A mysterious fall ends the life of one of Junktown's leading citizens and Qwill suspects it was no accident. It takes Koko to prove him right.

== Reception ==
A review in the Detroit Free Press, found it "by far the most effective" of the series to that point.
