= The Cat Who Played Post Office =

1987 novel by Lilian Jackson Braun

- Soft cover
- Author: Lilian Jackson Braun
- Language: English
- Series: The Cat Who series
- Genre: Mystery
- Publisher: Jove
- Publication date: 1987
- Publication place: United States
- Media type: Print (hardback & paperback)
- ISBN: 0-515-09320-3
- OCLC: 17197171
- Preceded by: The Cat Who Played Brahms
- Followed by: The Cat Who Knew Shakespeare

The Cat Who Played Post Office is the sixth book in Lilian Jackson Braun's The Cat Who series. The novel was published in 1987 by Jove.

== Plot ==
Through an inheritance from Aunt Fanny, Jim Qwilleran has acquired a large mansion in the Great Lakes area and, of course, a mystery. Iris Cobb joins him in Pickax as the mansion's caretaker, along with Koko and Yum Yum. Koko keeps trying to tell Qwill something about the missing housemaid, Daisy Mull.
