= Stalking the Angel =

1989 detective novel by Robert Crais

- Author: Robert Crais
- Language: English
- Series: Elvis Cole series
- Genre: Detective fiction
- Publisher: Bantam
- Publication date: September 1989
- Publication place: United States
- Media type: Print (Paperback)
- Pages: 260
- ISBN: 0-553-28644-7
- Preceded by: The Monkey's Raincoat
- Followed by: Lullaby Town

Stalking the Angel is a 1989 detective novel by Robert Crais. It is the second in a series of linked novels centering on the private investigator Elvis Cole. An audiobook was released in 2001.

== Plot summary ==
Elvis Cole and Joe Pike are hired to find a stolen rare Japanese manuscript, the Hagakure. Their search takes them into Los Angeles's Little Tokyo and the dangerous world of the Yakuza, where they encounter madness, murder, and sexual obsession.

== Characters ==
- Elvis Cole: The main protagonist, a wise-cracking, insightful private investigator, known for his unconventional methods and strong moral compass.
- Joe Pike: Elvis Cole's silent and deadly partner, a former Marine with exceptional skills in combat and investigation.
- Bradley Warren: Elvis’s client. Self-important wealthy hotel chain owner.
- Jillian Becker: Bradley’s extremely loyal assistant.
- Hatcher: Warren’s family hired security.
- Sheila Warren: Bradley’s unhappy alcohol addicted wife.
- Mimi Warren: Bradley's and Sheila’s sixteen years old daughter.
- Berke Feldstein: Elvis’s former client and informant.
- Nobu Ishida: Japanese yakuza.
- Lou Poitras: Police detective and old friend of Elvis.
- Eddie Tang: Japanese yakuza.
