= The Cat Who Tailed a Thief =

1997 novel by Lilian Jackson Braun

- First edition (h/b)
- Author: Lilian Jackson Braun
- Language: English
- Series: The Cat Who series
- Genre: Mystery
- Publisher: G. P. Putnam's Sons (h/b); Jove Books (p/b)
- Publication date: 1997
- Publication place: United States
- Media type: Print (hardback & paperback)
- ISBN: 0-515-12240-8
- OCLC: 38463733
- Preceded by: The Cat Who Said Cheese
- Followed by: The Cat Who Sang for the Birds

The Cat Who Tailed a Thief is the nineteenth book in The Cat Who series of mystery novels by Lilian Jackson Braun, published in 1997.

== Plot summary ==
The residents of Pickax take pride in a town which has considerably less crime than the places "Down Below." However, this holiday season has seen a streak of small crimes. New in town is the bank manager, Willard Carmichael and wife Danielle. Her cousin wants to restore historic Pleasant Avenue to its original splendor, but something seems amiss to Qwill. Two deaths soon follow.
