= Bouchercon XX =

1989 mystery and detective fiction convention

- "Give Me Liberty or Give Me...Death"
- Date: October 6, 1989
- Location: Philadelphia, Pennsylvania
- Country: USA
- Hosted by: Deen Kogan & Jay Kogan

Bouchercon is an annual convention of creators and devotees of mystery and detective fiction. It is named in honour of writer, reviewer, and editor Anthony Boucher; also the inspiration for the Anthony Awards, which have been issued at the convention since 1986. This article details Bouchercon XX and the 4th Anthony Awards ceremony.

== Bouchercon ==
The convention was held in Philadelphia, Pennsylvania, on October 6, 1989; running until the 8th. The event was chaired by Deen Kogan and Jay Kogan, founders of the Society Hill playhouse.

=== Special guests ===
- Lifetime Achievement award — Dorothy Salisbury Davis
- Guest of Honor — Simon Brett
- Fan Guests of Honor — William F. Deeck and Linda Toole
- Toastmaster — Bruce Taylor
- Distinguished Contribution award — Joan Kahn

== Anthony Awards ==
The following list details the awards distributed at the fourth annual Anthony Awards ceremony.

=== Novel award ===
Winner:

- Thomas Harris, The Silence of the Lambs

Shortlist:

- Dorothy Cannell, The Widows Club
- Sue Grafton, "E" Is for Evidence
- Tony Hillerman, A Thief of Time
- Sara Paretsky, Blood Shot
- Nancy Picard, Dead Crazy
- Bill Pronzini, Shackles
- Les Roberts, Pepper Pike

=== First novel award ===
Winner:

- Elizabeth George, A Great Deliverance

Shortlist:

- Mary Lou Bennett, Murder Once Done
- Caroline Graham, The Killings at Badger's Drift
- Linda Grant, Random Access Murder
- Gar Anthony Haywood, Fear of the Dark
- David Stout, Carolina Skeletons

=== Paperback original award ===
Winner:

- Carolyn G. Hart, Something Wicked

Shortlist:

- Michael Avallone, High Noon at Midnight
- P.M. Carlson, Murder Unrenovated
- David Handler, The Man Who Died Laughing
- Lia Matera, A Radical Departure
- Sharyn McCrumb, Paying the Piper
- D.R. Meredith, Murder by Impulse
- Marilyn Wallace, Primary Target
