= The Cat Who Knew a Cardinal =

1991 novel by Lilian Jackson Braun

- First edition (h/b)
- Author: Lilian Jackson Braun
- Language: English
- Series: The Cat Who series
- Genre: Mystery
- Publisher: G. P. Putnam's Sons (h/b); Jove Books (p/b)
- Publication date: 1991
- Publication place: United States
- Media type: Print (hardback & paperback)
- Pages: 275
- ISBN: 0-515-10786-7
- OCLC: 30969579
- Preceded by: The Cat Who Lived High
- Followed by: The Cat Who Moved a Mountain

The Cat Who Knew a Cardinal is the twelfth book in The Cat Who series of mystery novels by Lilian Jackson Braun, published in 1991. The novel is set in the fictional Pickaxe City, in Moose Country, “400 miles north of everywhere”.

== Plot summary ==
Jim Qwilleran and his lovable siamese cats, Koko and Yum-Yum, have moved into an apple barn on the Klingenschoen estate. After a successful closing night on the stage production Henry VIII in the theatre that was once the Klingenschoen mansion the actors throw a cast party at Qwill's new home. At the end of the party, Qwill notices one car had not left yet. Walking towards the car, wondering if someone has broken down or run out of gas, he discovers the dead body of the much disliked play's director and high school principal, Hilary VanBrook. VanBrook was killed by a single gunshot to the back of the head.

== During the story ==
During the story, Qwill continues his search for a copy of the book he once wrote, City of Brotherly Crime, looking through used bookstores and libraries. He eventually finds a copy near the end of the story. Later, he and the cats spends the night at the home of the Ingleharts to see a steeplechase. He meets a man named Steve O'Hare. After the event, they arrive back at the Ingleharts to hear Koko howling from inside. Running inside, they find that Grummy Inglehart, the grandmother, has died from a heart attack. Koko watches a cardinal every morning outside the window, which is shot by a stablemaster named Steve for fun after visiting Qwill about a horse barn Qwill is interested in.

Dennis Hough, the person who remodeled Qwill's barn, disappeared after the murder, creating rumors. Qwill visited his apartment to try to find his whereabouts to clear Dennis's name, and found a message on his answering machine, which Qwill recorded on a tape recorder. Returning home, Dennis is found hanging from the balcony in Qwill's barn. He had committed suicide. Showing the recording to Brodie, the chief of police, it was deduced that Dennis hanged himself learning that his wife was divorcing him.

He visits VanBrook's home with Susan Exbridge to help her go through the boxes of books in his home. Koko, after jumping onto the top shelf, leads Qwill to a hollowed out book containing a sort of catalogue for VanBrook's collection. Finding red dots beside selected books, he sets out to find them in the many rooms. Taking a few "red-dotted" books home, he discovered money inside all three of them. He reported this to Vanbrook's attorney and they retrieved all books inside the house with red dots beside them. They found a bunch of money inside all of them. All counterfeit.

Inside one of the books, Qwill finds another will of VanBrook's, saying that he leaves money to Robin Stucker, son of Fiona Stucker and Steve O'Hare. Qwilleran solves the case after finding this. He figures out that Steve killed Hilary after learning that he was writing Robin out of his will because he dropped out of school. However, Hilary had already re-written his will and given it to his attorney.

Qwilleran is visited by the local bookstore owner to give him a book he found and Qwill tells him to hide out of sight on the balcony and listen when Steve arrives in his van at the barn. When Steve comes in for a drink, Qwilleran tells him that he figured out it was he who killed VanBrook and can prove it. Steve pulls a gun, but a giant tapestry hanging from Qwill's balconies falls on Steve and Qwill hits him with a stick, knocking him out. Steve is arrested following the arrival of the cops on the scene.
