= Sharyn McCrumb =

American writer (born 1948)

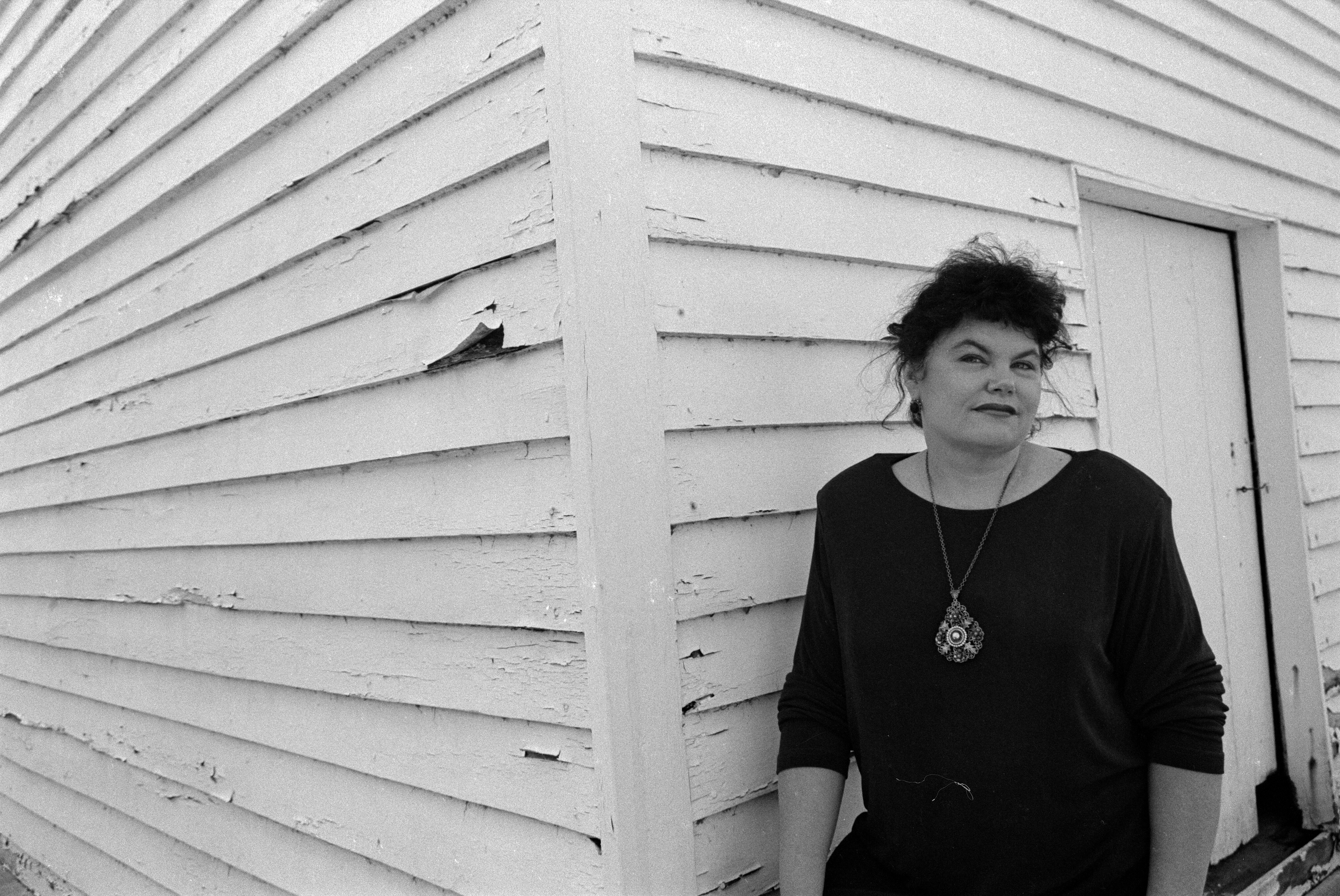
- Sharyn McCrumb c. 1997
- Born: Sharyn Elaine Arwood; February 26, 1948 (age 78); Wilmington, North Carolina, U.S.
- Education: Master's degree
- Alma mater: University of North Carolina at Chapel Hill; Virginia Tech
- Writing career
- Notable works: Ballad series Elizabeth MacPherson series
- Notable awards: See list

Sharyn McCrumb (born February 26, 1948) is an American writer best known for books that celebrate the history and folklore of Appalachia. McCrumb is the winner of numerous literary awards, and is the author of the best-selling Ballad novels, set in the North Carolina/Tennessee mountains; the NASCAR series featuring St. Dale; and the Elizabeth McPherson mystery series.

== Early life ==
Sharyn McCrumb was born Sharyn Elaine Arwood on February 26, 1948, in Wilmington, North Carolina.

== Career ==
McCrumb is a Southern writer, perhaps best known for her Appalachian Ballad novels, including The New York Times bestsellers The Ballad of Frankie Silver and She Walks These Hills, and for St. Dale, winner of a Library of Virginia Award and featured at the National Festival of the Book. The Devil Amongst the Lawyers (2010) deals with the regional stereotyping of rural areas by national journalists. The Ballad of Tom Dooley (2011) tells the true story behind the celebrated folk song. In 2008 McCrumb was named a Virginia Woman of History for Achievement in Literature.

Educated at the University of North Carolina at Chapel Hill with a master's degree in English from Virginia Tech, McCrumb was the first writer-in-residence at King College in Tennessee. In 2005, she was honored as the Writer of the Year at Emory & Henry College.

Her novels, studied in universities throughout the world, have been translated into eleven languages, including French, German, Dutch, Japanese, Arabic, and Italian. She has lectured on her work at Oxford University, the University of Bonn-Germany, and at the Smithsonian Institution. McCrumb has also taught a writers workshop in Paris and served as writer-in-residence at King College in Tennessee and at the Chautauqua Institute in western New York.

In 2008 McCrumb was honored as one of the Library of Virginia's "Virginia Women in History" for her career.

== Novels ==
McCrumb is the author of The Ballad Novels, a series set in the Appalachian Mountains. These books weave together the legends, geography and contemporary issues of Appalachia, and each centers on an event from North Carolina history. She is also the author of the Elizabeth MacPherson mystery series, though her career has evolved beyond genre fiction.

=== Ballad series ===
- If Ever I Return, Pretty Peggy-O. Scribner. 1990. ISBN 978-0-684-19104-1.
- The Hangman's Beautiful Daughter. Scribner. 1992. ISBN 0-684-19407-4.
- She Walks These Hills. Scribner's. 1994. ISBN 0-684-19556-9.
- The Rosewood Casket. Dutton. 1996. ISBN 0-525-94011-1.
- The Ballad of Frankie Silver.
- The Songcatcher. Dutton. 2001. ISBN 0-525-94488-5.
- Ghost Riders. Dutton Adult. 2003. ISBN 0-525-94718-3.
- The Devil Amongst the Lawyers. Thomas Dunne Books. 2010. ISBN 978-0-312-55816-1.
- The Ballad of Tom Dooley: A Novel (Appalachian Ballad). Thomas Dunne Books. 2011. ISBN 978-0-312-55817-8.
- King's Mountain. Thomas Dunne Books. 2013. ISBN 978-1-250-011404
- Nora Bonesteel's Christmas Past. Abingdon Press. 2014. ISBN 9781426754210
- Prayers the Devil Answers. Atria Books. 2016. ISBN 9781476772813
- The Unquiet Grave. Atria Books. 2017. ISBN 9781476772875

=== St. Dale novels ===
In 2005, NASCAR racing fan McCrumb wrote St. Dale. Her inspiration for the novel came from her study of medieval literature at Virginia Tech and her desire to update Geoffrey Chaucer's The Canterbury Tales. It was Dale Earnhardt who became the saint of her tale, complete with the Dale Earnhardt Pilgrimage of fans.

- St. Dale. Kensington. 2005. ISBN 0-7582-0776-X.
- Once Around the Track. Kensington. 2007. ISBN 978-0-7582-0778-4.
- McCrumb, Sharyn; Edwards, Adam (2010). Faster Pastor. Ingalls Publishing Group. ISBN 978-1-932158-88-5.

=== Elizabeth MacPherson novels ===
- Sick of Shadows. Avon Books. 1984. ISBN 978-0-380-87189-6.
- Lovely in Her Bones. Avon Books. 1985. ISBN 978-0-380-89592-2.
- Highland Laddie Gone. Avon Books. 1986. ISBN 978-0-380-89910-4.
- Paying the Piper. Ballantine Books. 1988. ISBN 0-345-34518-5.
- The Windsor Knot. Ballantine Books. 1990. ISBN 0-345-36583-6.
- Missing Susan. Ballantine Books. 1991. ISBN 0-345-36575-5.
- MacPherson's Lament. Ballantine Books. 1992. ISBN 978-0-345-36576-7.
- If I'd Killed Him When I Met Him. Ballantine Books. 1995. ISBN 978-0-345-38229-0.
- The PMS Outlaws. Wheeler Publishing. 2000. ISBN 978-1-56895-935-1.

=== Jay Omega novels ===
These are satirical novels set in the world of science fiction conventions and fandom.

- Bimbos of the Death Sun. TSR. 1988. ISBN 0-88038-455-7.
- Zombies of the Gene Pool. Simon & Schuster. 1992. ISBN 0-671-70526-1.

=== Short story collections ===
- Our Separate Days. 1985. (Co-author: Mona Walton Helper)
- Foggy Mountain Breakdown and Other Stories. Ballantine Books. 1997. ISBN 0-345-41493-4.

== Awards ==
Winners are in bold

Awarding body	Year	Award issued	Work
National Daughters of the American Revolution	2017	**Woman of the Arts Award**	
West Virginia Library Association	2017	**Literary Merit Award**	
Clarksville Arts and Heritage Development Council	2015	**Patricia Winn Award for Southern Fiction**	**King's Mountain**
Chowan University	2014	**Mary Frances Hobson Prize for Southern Literature**	
Library of Virginia	2008	**Virginia Woman in History Award**	
Library of Virginia	2006	**People's Choice Award for Fiction**	**St. Dale**
Appalachian Writers Association	2006	**Book of the Year**	**St. Dale**
Appalachian Writers Association	2005	**Best Novel**	**St. Dale**
Appalachian Writers Association	1992	**Best Novel**	**The Hangman's Beautiful Daughter**
Appalachian Writers Association	1985	**Best Novel**	**Lovely in Her Bones**
Audio Publishers Association	2004	**Best Recorded Book**	**Ghost Riders**
East Tennessee State University	2003	**Wilma Dykeman Award for Literature**	**Ghost Riders**
Flora MacDonald Award	1999	**Achievement in the Arts by a Woman of Scots Heritage**	
Shepard University and the WV Heritage Council	1999	**Appalachian Heritage Writer's Award**	
Berea College	1998	**Plattner Award for Best Appalachian Short Story**	**Foggy Mountain Breakdown**
Morehead State University	1998	**Chaffin Award for Appalachian Writing**	
Appalachian Writers Association	1997	**Outstanding Contribution to Appalachian Literature**	
Agatha Award	1995	**Best Novel**	**If I'd Killed Him When I Met Him**
Agatha Award	1994	**Best Novel**	**She Walks These Hills**
Agatha Award	1992	Best Novel	The Hangman's Beautiful Daughter
Agatha Award	1992	Best Short-story	"Happiness is a Dead Poet"
Agatha Award	1989	**Best Short-story**	**"A Wee Doch and Doris"**
Agatha Award	1988	Best Novel	Paying the Piper
Anthony Award	1995	**Best Novel**	**She Walks These Hills**
Anthony Award	1995	**Best Short-story**	**"The Monster of Glamis"**
Anthony Award	1991	Best Novel	If Ever I Return, Pretty Peggy-O
Anthony Award	1991	Best Short-story	"The Luncheon"
Anthony Award	1991	Best Short-story	"Remains to be Seen"
Anthony Award	1990	Best Short-story	"A Wee Doch and Doris"
Anthony Award	1989	Best Paperback Original	Paying the Piper
Anthony Award	1988	Best Paperback Original	Bimbos of the Death Sun
Edgar Award	1988	**Best Paperback Original**	**Bimbos of the Death Sun**
Sherwood Anderson Short Story Award	1984	**Best Short Story**	**"Precious Jewel"**
Macavity Award	1995	**Best Novel**	**She Walks These Hills**
Macavity Award	1991	**Best Novel**	**If Ever I Return Pretty Peggy-O**
Nero Award	1995	**Best Novel**	**She Walks These Hills**
