= Free Fall (Crais novel) =

1993 detective novel by Robert Crais

- Author: Robert Crais
- Language: English
- Series: Elvis Cole series
- Genre: Detective fiction
- Publisher: Bantam
- Publication date: 1993
- Publication place: United States
- Media type: Print (Hardcover and Paperback)
- Pages: 280
- ISBN: 0-553-09242-1
- Preceded by: Lullaby Town
- Followed by: Voodoo River

Free Fall is a 1993 detective novel by Robert Crais. It is the fourth in a series of linked novels centering on the private investigator Elvis Cole.

== Plot summary ==
Elvis Cole is known for his inability to refuse helping those in need, especially young women in trouble. Jennifer Sheridan seeks Elvis Cole's help because she believes her fiance, a decorated Los Angeles cop in an elite unit, is in serious trouble. Elvis Cole and Joe Pike are quickly embroiled in a dangerous case involving South Central gangs, corrupt police, and hidden secrets immediately after a new client departs. Elvis Cole and Joe Pike, escaped and armed killers, become the targets of the entire Los Angeles Police Department.

== Characters ==
- Elvis Cole: A sharp and a private investigator with a knack for getting into trouble while solving cases.
- Joe Pike: Cole's loyal partner. A former military operative, Pike provides muscle and backup when things get rough.
- Jennifer Sheridan: The worried girlfriend who hires Cole. She believes her fiancé is in severe danger.
- Mark Thurman: An Los Angeles Police Department officer whose troubles spark the investigation. His integrity is called into question.
- Lou Poitras: A friend of Cole's and a fellow investigator, contributing to the case's regency.
- Floyd Riggens: A corrupt officer involved in scandalous activities, complicating the investigation.
