= Lullaby Town =

1992 detective novel by Robert Crais

- Author: Robert Crais
- Language: English
- Series: Elvis Cole series
- Genre: Detective fiction
- Publisher: Bantam
- Publication date: 1992
- Publication place: United States
- Media type: Print (Hardcover and Paperback)
- Pages: 295
- ISBN: 0-553-08197-7
- Preceded by: Stalking the Angel
- Followed by: Free Fall

Lullaby Town is a 1992 detective novel by Robert Crais. It is the third in a series of linked novels centering on the private investigator Elvis Cole.

== Plot summary ==
Peter Alan Nelsen, a successful but demanding Hollywood director, tasks Elvis with finding his estranged wife and child. Cole takes on an easy case that quickly escalates into a nightmare when the ex-wife he's meant to find is nothing like he anticipated. Elvis might be in serious trouble because of his lady friend's mob connections, potentially leading to him opening a private investigator branch at the bottom of the Hudson River - a euphemism for being killed by the mob.

== Characters ==
- Elvis Cole: The main protagonist, a private investigator, he possesses superior martial arts skills and a penchant for humor.
- Joe Pike: Cole's partner, a former soldier, who is taciturn, dangerous, and always ready to back Elvis when the stakes rise.
- Peter Alan Nelson: An arrogant Hollywood filmmaker who hires Cole to locate his ex-wife and son.
- Karen Lloyd: Nelson's estranged wife, managing a local bank while entangled in mob activities.
- Toby Nelson: The 12-year-old son, oblivious to his father's identity.
