= Sunset Express =

1996 novel by Robert Crais

- First edition
- Author: Robert Crais
- Language: English
- Series: Elvis Cole series
- Genre: Detective fiction
- Publisher: Hyperion Books
- Publication date: 1996
- Publication place: United States
- Media type: Print (Paperback)
- Pages: 352 pp
- ISBN: 0-345-45494-4
- Preceded by: Voodoo River
- Followed by: Indigo Slam

Sunset Express is a 1996 detective novel by Robert Crais. It is the sixth in a series of linked novels centering on the private investigator Elvis Cole. It won the Shamus Award and was named as one of the "Best Books of 1996" by Publishers Weekly.
