= Bimbos of the Death Sun =

Book by Sharyn McCrumb

- First edition
- Author: Sharyn McCrumb
- Language: English
- Series: Jay Omega series
- Genre: Mystery
- Publisher: TSR, Ballantine
- Publication place: United States
- English publication date: February 1987
- Media type: Print (Paperback)
- ISBN: 978-0-345-48302-7
- OCLC: 137341615
- Followed by: Zombies of the Gene Pool (1992)

Bimbos of the Death Sun is a 1987 mystery novel by Sharyn McCrumb.

== Plot summary ==
The novel takes place at Rubicon, a fictional science fiction convention being held in the Virginia suburbs of Washington, DC, and at which the guests of honor are Appin Dungannon, a fantasy author noted for his books about hero Tratyn Runewind, and Dr. James O. Mega, an electrical engineering professor at Virginia Tech, who, under the pen name Jay Omega, has written one novel. That novel, a hard science fiction book about a space station crew whose female members are affected by radiation from a dying star (which causes them to become less intelligent), was retitled Bimbos of the Death Sun and given an R-rated cover by the publisher.

Mega is somewhat lost in the world of hardcore SF and fantasy fans at the con, but his companion, Marion, a professor of English literature, is more familiar with these events, and she guides him through it. They have troubles, such as being asked to judge a fiction contest (which Marion tackles eagerly) and a costume contest. All seems to be going somewhat well for Mega, but his co-Guest of Honor, Dungannon, is making it a point to offend everyone at the con - he is highly successful with a series of adventure novels featuring "Tratyn Runewind," an alpha-male Norse warrior similar to Conan the Barbarian, but he has come to hate the character when Tratyn becomes so successful there is more interest in the cheesy novels than his lone serious work on Norse mythology (which remains unpublished). It is hardly surprising when he is killed, a bullet through his heart. The fans react by buying up everything with his signature in the huckster room.

The police are at a loss to find the murderer. Everyone had a motive to kill Dungannon, but it seems that no one had the opportunity. Jay and Marion begin investigating and discover many things about Dungannon - he was working on what was to be the last Runewind book, while revealing the depths of his hatred for the character, and that someone had tried to erase the last chapter that depicted Tratyn's humiliating death. Jay corrals the suspects into a scheduled role-playing game event and works out a confession in the way Hamlet did ("The play's the thing / Wherein I'll catch the conscience of the King") with the police detective doing his best to understand the process of a role-playing game. The murderer is revealed to be a super-fan who found out about Tratyn's "death" and killed Dungannon to keep it from happening. As he attempts to kill Jay, Jay uses a plugged-in CRT monitor to block the sword the fan uses, which electrocutes the killer when he stabs the screen.

While the murder investigation continues, the author satirizes a lot of events at science fiction conventions, such as cosplay and the filk songs that science fiction fans sing.

== Reception ==
Dave Langford reviewed Bimbos of the Death Sun for White Dwarf #99, and stated that "McCrumb deploys her research with kitchen-sink enthusiasm, neatly caricaturing several SF fan stereotypes but striking an unconvincing note when all these wildly different and often mutually intolerant types sit down to play D&D together."

=== Awards ===
The novel won the 1988 Edgar Allan Poe Award for Best Paperback Original and was nominated for the Anthony Award in the same category in the same year.
