= The Cat Who Came to Breakfast =

1994 novel by Lilian Jackson Braun

- First UK edition cover
- Author: Lilian Jackson Braun
- Language: English
- Series: The Cat Who series
- Genre: Mystery
- Publisher: G. P. Putnam's Sons
- Publication date: 1994
- Publication place: United States
- Media type: Print (hardback & paperback)
- Pages: 254 pp (first edition, hardback)
- ISBN: 0-399-13868-4 (first edition, hardback)
- OCLC: 28799226
- Dewey Decimal: 813/.54 20
- LC Class: PS3552.R354 C3345 1994
- Preceded by: The Cat Who Went into the Closet
- Followed by: The Cat Who Blew the Whistle

The Cat Who Came to Breakfast (1994) is the sixteenth mystery novel by Lilian Jackson Braun, one of The Cat Who series.

Qwilleran and his cats solve another mystery, this time at the newly sprouted Breakfast Island, a resort hot spot with an attractive history. As it turns out, Breakfast Island is only one of several names given to this island that is also called Pear Island (for its shape). XYZ Developers, an environmentally unconscious consortium buys up the southern part of the island and puts up a gaudy, touristy series of fudge shops, T-shirt shops, pizza shops and a Caribbean Pirate Themed Hotel and Lounge, where a guest is found dead in the pool.

Qwill decides to accept an invitation to stay at Lori and Nick Bamba's Domino Inn so that he can nose around a bit. Qwill finds out that the country club set own a part of the island that they call Grand Island that includes an exclusive marina. He also finds out that the long established islanders call the island Providence Island (thanking Providence for their rescue from shipwrecks) and don't really care for the country club set, but strongly dislike the tourists.

Qwill rescues Elizabeth Applehardt, the strange young daughter of one of the most elite families in the country club set, after a snake bite incident. He then is able to meet this family and learn about their history on the island. Eventually a 'northern hurricane' destroys the XYZ development and Qwill's K Foundation restores it to its natural beauty. Elizabeth Applehardt moves to Pickax and starts to develop into a quite capable young lady.

== Critical reception ==
According to Publishers Weekly, "Braun [...] gives fans what they crave in this latest meandering tale about the skeptical, lovable Qwill on an island full of cats."
