= The Cat Who Ate Danish Modern =

Novel by Liliam Jackson

- Author: Lilian Jackson Braun
- Language: English
- Series: The Cat Who series
- Genre: Mystery
- Publisher: E. P. Dutton
- Publication date: June 1967
- Publication place: United States
- Media type: Print (hardback & paperback)
- ISBN: 0-515-08712-2
- Preceded by: The Cat Who Could Read Backwards
- Followed by: The Cat Who Turned On and Off

The Cat Who Ate Danish Modern is the second novel in Lilian Jackson Braun's The Cat Who... series, published in 1967. This book introduces Yum Yum, who became a permanent character in the series.

== Plot introduction ==
Qwilleran, a reporter for the Daily Fluxion, and Koko, his Siamese cat with strange talents, are settling into Qwill's newest assignment—a magazine specializing in interior decorating. His first assignment leads him to David Lyke and his partner, Starkweather. David introduces him to George Tait and his Swiss wife, who had paid him to decorate their home in Muggy Swamp, an ultra rich neighborhood. George Tait is a collector of jade and he enthusiastically allows Odd Bunsen, a photographer, to take pictures of them. A day after the article comes out, the Tait mansion is robbed and Mrs. Tait is dead of a heart attack.

On the other hand, Qwill meets David's clientele and his decorator friends, including rich banker Harry Noyton and his ex-wife, Natalie. He is traveling to Europe so he offers to rent out his apartment to Qwill. He moves into his expensive apartment, but Koko starts eating fabric off the expensive furniture. Also, he bites Alacoque Wright, the new lady in Qwill's life. He also finds that Harry Noyton knew Mrs. Tait and that he is in Denmark.

He suspected sabotage by the Morning Rampage when a house he covers for his second assignment gets raided. For his third article, he published David Lyke's apartment but he is found dead by Koko and Odd Bunsen. He suspected the Japanese chef since David Lyke had Japan's national treasures.

He finally meet David's ex-friend and rival, John Baker, who tells him that David was an orphan who was a self made interior decorator. However, he also charmed the ladies and talked bad about his friends. When Qwill finally reads the Tait file and looks closely at a picture Koko licks, the pieces fall into place.

- Tait made some really bad business decisions and so, he was near bankruptcy.
- His jades were insured and he could get a lot of money if they were stolen
- Mrs. Tait's family were scientists and needed funding for new products
- David was murdered by Natalie Noyton since she assumed he would marry her after she got a divorce. When he didn't, she committed homicide-suicide.
- Mrs Tait had asked Harry Noyton to invest in her family before her death

When Qwill arrives at Tait's, to pick up Yum Yum, an orphan Siamese, he finds the jades in a secret compartment of a shelf. George Tait is not happy and tries to smash in his skull. Koko trips him and saves Q's life.

== Reception ==
Marguerite R. Oliver of the Springfield Leader & Press wrote that Braun "uses extensive knowledge of interior decorating and the myseterious personalities of the foreign felines to concoct a delightfully different story." Dan Marlowe of the Detroit Free Press called it a "thoroughly delightful story which will charm the socks off all ailurophiles and might even be the means of coverting a few ailurophobes." Alice Cromie of the Chicago Tribune called it a "lively account of the world of interior decoration, with perceptive comments and pleseantly puzzling cases of murder and theft."
