= Robert Crais =

American author of detective fiction

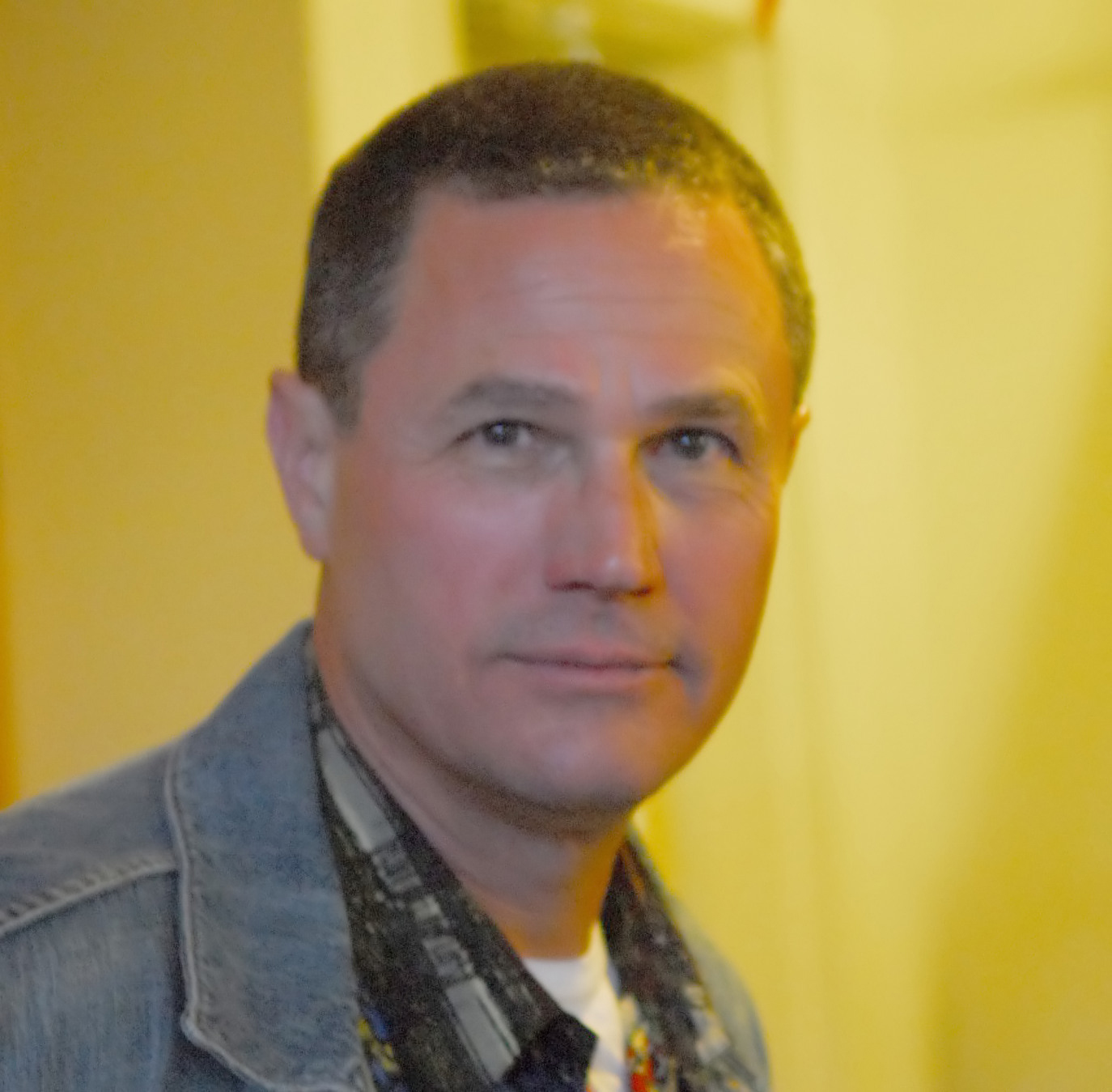
- Crais in 2008
- Born: June 20, 1953 (age 73); Independence, Louisiana, U.S.
- Education: Louisiana State University
- Occupations: Novelist; screenwriter
- Writing career
- Pen name: Elvis Cole, Jerry Gret Samouche
- Genres: Fiction, crime fiction, thrillers
- Website: robertcrais.com

Robert Crais (pronounced /kreɪs/; born June 20, 1953) is an American author of detective fiction and former screenwriter. Crais began his career writing scripts for television shows such as Hill Street Blues, Cagney & Lacey, Quincy, Miami Vice and L.A. Law. His writing is influenced by Raymond Chandler, Dashiell Hammett, Ernest Hemingway, Robert B. Parker and John Steinbeck. Crais has won numerous awards for his crime novels. Lee Child has cited him in interviews as one of his favorite American crime writers. The novels of Robert Crais have been published in 62 countries and are bestsellers around the world. Robert Crais received the Ross Macdonald Literary Award in 2006 and was named Grand Master by the Mystery Writers of America in 2014.

== Biography ==
Born in Independence, Louisiana, he was adopted and raised as an only child. He attended Louisiana State University and studied mechanical engineering.

Crais moved to Hollywood in 1976, where he initially found work as a screenwriter for the television series Baretta and Quincy, M.E., later working on Hill Street Blues, Cagney & Lacey and Miami Vice. He was nominated for an Emmy award for a Hill Street Blues episode he co-wrote in 1981. Following the death of his father in 1985, Crais published the novel The Monkey's Raincoat, which won the 1988 Anthony Award for "Best Paperback Original" and the 1988 Mystery Readers International Macavity Award for "Best First Novel". It has since been selected as one of the 100 Favorite Mysteries of the Century by the Independent Mystery Booksellers Association.

In 2006 Crais was awarded the Ross Macdonald Literary Award and in 2010 the Private Eye Writers of America's (PWA) Lifetime Achievement Award The Eye. In 2014 Crais received the Mystery Writers of America's (MWA) Grand Master Award. In 2026, MWA awarded The Big Empty the Edgar Allen Poe Award for Best Novel.

Crais novels include Demolition Angel, Hostage, Suspect, and The Two-Minute Rule. Most of Crais' books feature the characters Elvis Cole and Joe Pike, with The Watchman (2007), The First Rule (2010) and The Sentry (2011) centering on Joe Pike. Taken is a 2012 detective novel by Robert Crais. It is the fifteenth in a series of linked novels centering on the character Elvis Cole. The 2005 film Hostage was an adaptation of one of his books.

In 2020 his novel Suspect (2013) was named Best Mystery/Crime Novel of the Decade in the Barry Awards.

== Published works ==
=== Elvis Cole and Joe Pike novels ===
Nr	Year	Title	Award	Result
1	1987	The Monkey's Raincoat	Anthony Award – Best Paperback Original 1988	Won
1	1987	The Monkey's Raincoat	Macavity Award – Best First Novel 1988	Won
1	1987	The Monkey's Raincoat	Edgar Award – Best Paperback Original 1988	Nominated
1	1987	The Monkey's Raincoat	Shamus Award – Best Original P.I. Paperback 1988	Nominated
2	1989	Stalking the Angel		
3	1992	Lullaby Town	Anthony Award – Best Novel 1993	Nominated
3	1992	Lullaby Town	Shamus Award – Best P.I. Hardcover 1993	Nominated
4	1993	Free Fall	Edgar Award – Best Novel 1994	Nominated
5	1995	Voodoo River	Dilys Award	Nominated
6	1996	Sunset Express	Shamus Award – Best P.I. Novel 1997	Won
6	1996	Sunset Express	Publishers Weekly	Best Books of 1996 selection
7	1997	Indigo Slam	Shamus Award – Best P.I. Novel 1998	Nominated
8	1999	L.A. Requiem	Dilys Award	Won
8	1999	L.A. Requiem	Edgar Award – Best Novel 2000	Nominated
8	1999	L.A. Requiem	Anthony Award – Best Novel 2000	Nominated
8	1999	L.A. Requiem	Shamus Award – Best P.I. Novel 2000	Nominated
9	2003	The Last Detective	Audie Award	Finalist
10	2005	The Forgotten Man	Shamus Award – Best P.I. Novel 2006	Nominated
11	2007	The Watchman	Barry Award – Best Thriller 2008	Won
11	2007	The Watchman	Mystery Ink's Gumshoe Award – Best Thriller 2008	Won
11	2007	The Watchman	Anthony Award – Best Novel 2008	Nominated
11	2007	The Watchman	International Thriller Writers Awards – Best Novel 2008	Nominated
12	2008	Chasing Darkness	Southern California Independent Booksellers Association – Best Mystery Award	Nominated
13	2010	The First Rule	Shamus Award – Best Hardcover P.I. Novel 2011	Nominated
14	2011	The Sentry		
15	2012	Taken	Shamus Award – Best Hardcover P.I. Novel 2013	Won
15	2012	Taken	Left Coast Crime – The Watson (mystery novel with the best sidekick) 2013	Nominated
16	2015	The Promise		
17	2017	The Wanted		
18	2019	A Dangerous Man		
19	2022	Racing the Light		
20	2025	The Big Empty	Edgar Award – Best Novel 2026	Won

=== Other novels ===
Year	Title	Publisher	Award	Result
2000	Demolition Angel	Doubleday	Mary Higgins Clark Award 2001	Nominated
2000	Demolition Angel	Doubleday	Dilys Award	Nominated
2001	Hostage	Doubleday	New York Times Book Review	Notable Book
2006	The Two-Minute Rule	Simon & Schuster	London Evening Standard	Best Crime Novel of the Year
2006	The Two-Minute Rule	Simon & Schuster	Otto Penzler, The New York Sun	Top Ten Best Crime Novels of the Year
2006	The Two-Minute Rule	Simon & Schuster	Oline Cogdill, Sun-Sentinel	Top Ten Best Crime Novels of the Year
2006	The Two-Minute Rule	Simon & Schuster	January Magazine	Best Books of 2006
2006	The Two-Minute Rule	Simon & Schuster	Audie Award	Finalist
2013	Suspect			
