= Cleveland Amory =

American author, reporter, commentator and animal rights activist (1917–1998)

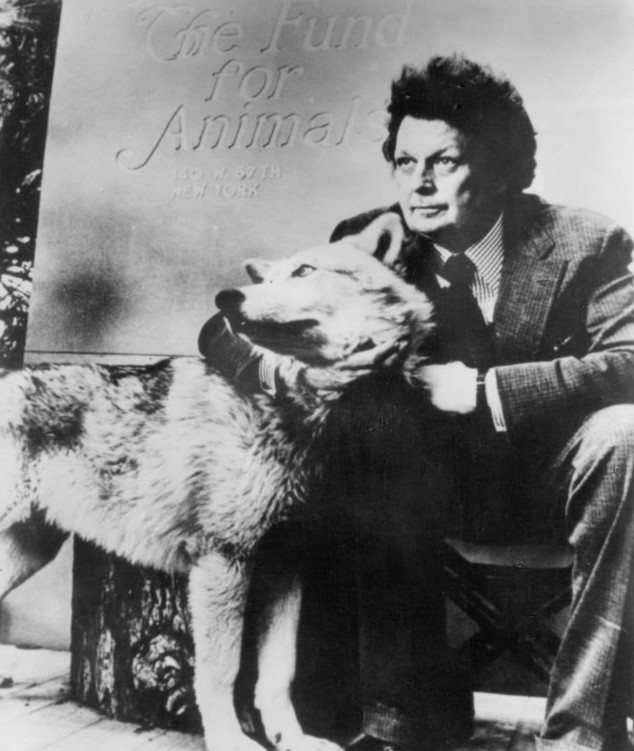
- Cleveland Amory in 1974
- Born: September 2, 1917; Nahant, Massachusetts
- Died: October 14, 1998 (aged 81); Manhattan, New York
- Resting place: Black Beauty Ranch, Murchison, Texas
- Citizenship: United States
- Education: Harvard University
- Occupations: Author, commentator, reporter, and animal rights activist
- Spouse(s): (1) Cora Fields Craddock (m. 1941–1947, divorced) (2) Martha Hodge (m. Dec. 31, 1954–1977, divorced)
- Writing career
- Notable works: The Proper Bostonians (1947); The Cat Who Came for Christmas (1987)

Cleveland Amory (September 2, 1917 – October 14, 1998) was an American author, reporter, television critic, commentator and animal rights activist. He wrote a series of popular books poking fun at the pretensions and customs of society, starting with The Proper Bostonians in 1947. From the 1950s through the 1990s, he had a career as a reporter and writer for national magazines and as a television and radio commentator. In the late 1980s and 1990s, he wrote bestselling books about his adopted cat, Polar Bear, starting with The Cat Who Came for Christmas (1987). Amory devoted much of his life to promoting animal rights, particularly protection of animals from hunting and vivisection. The executive director of the Humane Society of the United States described Amory as "the founding father of the modern animal protection movement."

== Early life ==
Amory was born September 2, 1917, into a privileged Boston Brahmin family; his parents were Robert Amory and Leonore Cobb Amory, daughter of Chicago architect Henry Ives Cobb. During his childhood, he had a great affection for his aunt Lucy "Lu" Creshore, who took in many stray animals and was instrumental in helping Amory get his first puppy, an event that Amory remembered seventy years later as the most memorable moment of his childhood.

In 1936, when he was 18, Amory held a summer job as tutor and companion to 13-year-old William Zinsser, who grew up to be a notable writer and editor. Zinsser later recalled that they had many discussions about their shared interest in journalism, which at that time was not considered suitable for upper-class young men. After attending Milton Academy, Amory went to Harvard where he was president of The Harvard Crimson.

== Career ==
=== Early career and social history trilogy ===
After graduating from Harvard in 1939, he worked as a reporter for the Nashua Telegraph and the Arizona Daily Star, and became managing editor of the Prescott Evening Courier. He was then hired by The Saturday Evening Post, where he was their youngest editor, and held that position until he left to serve in the Second World War. During the war, Amory served as a lieutenant in military intelligence in the United States Army. Upon returning, he worked as a writer and reporter for several publications.

Starting in the late 1940s, Amory wrote a series of bestselling social history books, starting with The Proper Bostonians (1947) and continuing through The Last Resorts (1952) and Who Killed Society? (1960), that satirized the pretensions of the upper class society, particularly in Boston, where he had grown up. In 1952, he became a regular columnist for the weekly magazine Saturday Review. He continued to write the column for 20 years, until 1972. He also wrote articles for many other publications. In the spring of 1955, he traveled to France with his wife Martha for an assignment with the Duke and Duchess of Windsor. Amory agreed to ghostwrite the Duchess' autobiography, but after realizing that she wanted him to sugar-coat her life, he quickly left the project.

=== Today show commentator ===
In 1952, Amory was hired as a commentator on the NBC morning news and talk television program Today, the first of its genre. He provided a televised commentary every few weeks, usually with light humor or satire. Because his subject matter tended to be light, the network did not review his planned commentaries in advance. Amory continued as a popular commentator for eleven years until 1963, when he was fired in one of his first controversial moments relating to his views on animal rights:

In 1963, Amory learned that the American Legion in Harmony, North Carolina, planned to sponsor a "bunny bop" rabbit killing contest. At that time, wild rabbits in the United States were widely regarded as both agricultural pests and game animals for hunting and eating. After learning of the "bunny bop," Amory and his assistant traveled to Harmony to engage in a debate with its planners. When he returned, instead of the usual lighthearted commentary expected by the Today show management, Amory proposed, on air and during viewers' breakfast hour, the formation of a hunt club where human hunters would be tracked down and killed for sport, arguing that killing hunters in cold blood would be humane and kind owing to their overpopulation. Viewer response was overwhelmingly negative and Amory was quickly reprimanded by NBC President Julian Goodman. Just a few months later, Amory again voiced controversial animal rights opinions during his Today show segment by speaking at length about the evils of vivisection—the abuse of animals in laboratory experiments. Although Amory did not entirely oppose the scientific use of animals, he strongly believed that many of them were being inhumanely and needlessly mistreated. His commentary drew opposition from scientists, and he was abruptly fired from the Today show with no warning.

=== Later career and Cat trilogy ===
Over time, the subject matter of Amory's published work increasingly focused on animal rights. From 1963 to 1976, Amory was a television critic for TV Guide magazine, where he drew the ire of hunters for his biting criticisms of sports hunting programs. His book Man Kind? Our Incredible War on Wildlife (1974) detailed inhumane hunting practices, sparking an editorial in The New York Times and a CBS documentary on hunting, The Guns of Autumn. Amory also presented a daily radio essay called "Curmudgeon at Large". Later he wrote a syndicated column called "Animail" and served as a senior contributing editor of Parade magazine from 1980 to 1998.

In the late 1980s and early 1990s, Amory wrote another series of bestselling nonfiction books about Polar Bear, a stray, starving white cat that he had rescued from a Manhattan street on Christmas Eve 1977. The Cat Who Came for Christmas (1987) spent twelve weeks at #1 on the New York Times bestseller list. Its sequels, The Cat and the Curmudgeon (1990) and The Best Cat Ever (1993, published after Polar Bear's death), also were bestsellers.

In 1988, Amory made his only feature film appearance in the role of "Mr. Danforth" in the comedy-drama Mr. North, starring Anthony Edwards.

Amory was a co-chairman of the executive committee for Writers and Artists for Peace in the Middle East, a pro-Israel group. In 1984, he signed a letter protesting German arms sales to Saudi Arabia.

== Animal rights work ==
=== Director and president of organizations ===
As a young newspaper reporter in Arizona, Amory was assigned to cover a bullfight along the border with Mexico. The New York Times reported in its obituary of Amory that he "was sickened both by the scene and by the winner's cutting off the bull's ears. He picked up a cushion and threw it at the bullfighter who fell to the ground. He never returned to the paper." He often said that led to his interest in animal welfare.

Beginning in the early 1960s, Amory, while maintaining his career as an outspoken reporter and commentator, began to devote an increasing amount of his time to animal rights organizations. In 1962, he joined the board of directors of the Humane Society of the United States (HSUS), remaining there until 1970. Amory also served as president of the New England Anti-Vivisection Society (NEAVS) from 1987 until his death in 1998.

=== The Fund for Animals ===
In 1967, Amory founded the Fund for Animals with a planned focus on protecting animals from hunters and creating animal sanctuaries. The Fund struggled during the first years of its existence but became known in 1979 for sponsoring a removal by air and land of 580 Grand Canyon burros slated for destruction by the National Park Service. Amory later fought a similar battle to prevent the killing of San Clemente Island's goats by the Department of Defense. By the time Amory died in 1998, the Fund had a "$2 million budget, more than 200,000 members, and three animal sanctuaries, and had initiated several high profile animal rescues, including the organic 'painting' of baby harp seals off the Magdalen Islands in Canada to ensure that their fur was worthless to hunters."

In 2005, a few years after Amory's death, HSUS formed a corporate association with the Fund for Animals.

=== Black Beauty Ranch ===
Inspired by Anna Sewell's novel Black Beauty, Amory established the Black Beauty Ranch, a 1,460 acres (590 hectares) sanctuary that sheltered various abused animals, including chimpanzees, burros and elephants. Located in Murchison, Texas, this ranch accommodated over 600 resident animals. Amory's goal when creating the animal refuge was to "create a sanctuary where its inhabitants would roam unfettered and unbothered by human taskmasters." The words on the ranch's gate are taken from the final lines of Sewell's novel: "I have nothing to fear, / and my story ends. / My troubles are all over, / and I am at home."

The ranch was created as sanctuary for the many burros rescued in 1979 and the early 1980s by the Fund for Animals. It became the largest sanctuary sponsored by the Fund. One of Black Beauty's most famous residents was a 25-year-old chimp named Nim Chimpsky who had been used in language experiments when young and then sold as a laboratory animal.

The ranch was the fulfillment of a longtime dream for Amory. He explained in his 1997 book Ranch of Dreams: "It was not long after reading Black Beauty for the first time that I had a dream that one day I would have a place which would embody everything Black Beauty loved about his final home. I dreamed that I would go even a step further—at my place none of the horses would ever wear a bit or blinkers or check reins, or in fact have reins at all, because they would never pull a cart, a carriage, a cab, or anything else. Indeed, they would never even be ridden—they would just run free."

Black Beauty Ranch is operated by HSUS.

=== Support of Sea Shepherd Conservation Society ===
In 1978, Amory purchased the first oceangoing vessel for Captain Paul Watson, the founder of the Sea Shepherd Conservation Society. Watson used this boat in his first actions against the Japanese whaling fleet. Amory took part in many campaigns such as the one waged by Paul Watson and the Sea Shepherd Conservation Society against whaling and sealing.

=== Influence on celebrities ===
Amory, who had many prominent persons and celebrities in his social circle, was noted for influencing celebrities to support animal rights. He reportedly enlisted Henry Fonda, Andy Williams and Grace Kelly, and he also recruited Doris Day, Angie Dickinson, and Mary Tyler Moore for his campaigns against fur clothing.

== Personal life ==
Amory was married twice. His first wife was Cora Fields Craddock in 1941; they divorced in 1947. His second wife was actress Martha Hodge, whom he married on December 31, 1954. The couple divorced in 1977. Amory had one stepdaughter by his second marriage.

Amory enjoyed playing chess and was a member of the New York Athletic Club.

== Death ==
Amory died in 1998 of an abdominal aortic aneurysm. He was cremated and his ashes were spread across Black Beauty Ranch by his favorite burro, named Friendly.

A stone monument to Amory stands on Black Beauty Ranch beside the monument and burial site of his beloved cat, Polar Bear.

== Awards and honors ==
Amory was inducted into the U.S. Animal Rights Hall of Fame in 2000, for his dedicated work on behalf of animals.

== Works ==
=== Written ===
All books are nonfiction, unless noted otherwise.

- The Proper Bostonians (1947)
- Home Town (1947) (novel)
- The Last Resorts (1952)
- Who Killed Society? (1960)
- Celebrity Register (1963) (with Earl Blackwell)
- Man Kind? Our Incredible War on Wildlife (1974)
- Animail (1976) (collection of Amory's syndicated columns)
- The Trouble With Nowadays: A Curmudgeon Strikes Back (1979) (fictional satire)
- The Cat Who Came for Christmas (1987)
- The Cat and the Curmudgeon (1990) (alternate title: The Cat Who Stayed for Christmas)
- The Best Cat Ever (1993)
- Cleveland Amory's Compleat Cat (1995) (collection of all three "Cat" titles)
- Ranch of Dreams (1997)

=== Edited ===
- Vanity Fair, A Cavalcade of the 1920s and 1930s (1960) (ed. with Frederic Bradlee)
- A Treasury of Great Recipes: Famous Specialties of the World's Foremost Restaurants Adapted for the American Kitchen (1974) (ed. with Vincent Price, Mary Price, and Martha Amory)

== See also ==
- List of animal rights advocates
