= The Cat Who Talked Turkey =

2003 novel by Lilian Jackson Braun

- First edition cover
- Author: Lilian Jackson Braun
- Audio read by: George Guidall
- Series: The Cat Who...
- Publisher: G. P. Putnam's Sons

The Cat Who Talked Turkey is the 26th novel in The Cat Who series written by American writer Lilian Jackson Braun. The audiobook is narrated by George Guidall.

== Plot introduction ==
A man is shot and killed in the woods on reporter Jim Qwilleran "Qwill"'s property, and his cat Koko howls his "death howl" at the exact time of the murder. The death is almost neglected because of the excitement about the neighboring town of Brr's bicentennial celebration. In order to write a story for the celebration, he interviews Edythe Carroll, who is a wealthy widow. Edythe, who now lives in Ittibittiwasse Estates, doesn't know that her granddaughter Lish (Alicia) and her "driver" (Lush) trashed her mansion while they stayed in it. After Qwill convinces Mrs. Carroll to turn her historic mansion into a museum, "Lish & Lush" are evicted from the house.

Gary Pratt (owner of the Hotel Booze) suggests Alicia handle sound effects on Qwill's new one-man show "The Great Storm". After Qwill hires her to research Koko's ancestry in Milwaukee, she is unable to assist with the show and is replaced by Maxine Pratt (Gary's wife and owner/operator of the marina in Brr). Alicia finds out "facts" about Koko's heritage (which are made up stories) and charges him an outrageous fee for the "research".

After the dedication of the Carroll Museum, Edythe and Qwill return to Edythe's home to discover "Lish" has burglarized the place. She stole many valuable miniature porcelain shoes her grandmother had collected. Later it is revealed that she dies in a car accident, but the porcelain shoes are recovered, because they were wrapped in thick towels and in suitcases in the car. In the end "Lish & Lush" are revealed as the shooters of the man in the woods. Lush visits Qwill's barn, not knowing "Lish" was killed in an accident. After revealing that he was her "shooter" and learning he would be arrested and put on trial for the crimes they committed, he ends up shooting and killing himself in Qwill's gazebo.

Koko "talks turkey" and begins attracting wild turkeys back to Moose County after a long absence.

== Reception ==
Peter Cannon of Publishers Weekly reviewed the book saying, "In spite of two murders and a pair of villains, the tale is as cozy as an hour spent cuddling your favorite cat." Ilene Cooper of Booklist said, "Loyal readers find the series inconsistencies and idiosyncrasies charming, but even they, at times, must wish for less of Qwill and more of the cats. R. Kent Rasmussen (Note: Rasmussen is also the author of Mark Twain A to Z, the real-life book that Polly gives to Qwilleran in The Cat Who Sang for the Birds.) of Library Journal reviewed the book saying, "As always, George Guidall's warm reading brings the characters alive and ensures that Braun's devoted listeners will welcome another visit to Moose County. No point in recommending this; if your library has "Cat Who" devotees, you must acquire it."
