= The Cat Who Came for Christmas =

1987 book by Cleveland Amory

- Author: Cleveland Amory
- Audio read by: Alan Sklar
- Language: English
- Genre: Memoir
- Publisher: Little Brown & Co
- Publication date: 1987
- Publication place: United States
- Media type: Hardback, Paperback, & Audio
- Pages: 240 pp
- ISBN: 0-316-03737-0
- OCLC: 15790076
- Followed by: The Cat and the Curmudgeon

The Cat Who Came for Christmas is the first book in a trilogy written by Cleveland Amory, an American author who wrote extensively about animal rights. Amory recounts his rescue and adoption of Polar Bear, a cat he featured in two future books. It was first published by Little, Brown and Company in 1987 and then in paperback by Penguin Books in 1988.

== Plot summary ==
Amory, a writer and animal rights activist (but not a cat person), finds a stray cat while walking down an alley one snowy Christmas Eve. Amory takes the cat to his apartment and acclimates him to living indoors. Polar Bear meets a number of Amory's celebrity friends and acquaintances, including Cary Grant, Walter Cronkite, and George C. Scott. Amory also details his animal rights work at the time.

== Reception ==
Kirkus Reviews wrote that the book was "utterly delightful and humorous, and a treasure for anyone who's ever been 'owned by a cat.'"

Publishers Weekly wrote: "Amory offers an entertaining, if precious, re-creation of his first year with Polar Bear (his account of selecting a name takes 20 pages)."

Mary Daniels in Chicago Tribune wrote, "Amory makes seamless transitions between what might otherwise be unrelated material by using Polar Bear as a sub-theme throughout the book."

The first edition was #8 on the New York Times bestseller list on November 29, 1987. It spent 20 weeks on the list. The 1988 paperback edition was #3 on the New York Times bestseller list on October 30, 1988. It reached #1, remaining in that place for 5 weeks. New York Times listed it as the #5 top paperback nonfiction book of 1988. The paperback returned to the New York Times bestseller list in fall 1988 at #3, the next month reaching #1.

== Audiobook, sequels, and combined edition ==
The audiobook is read by Alan Sklar.

The Cat Who Came for Christmas has two sequels:

- The Cat and the Curmudgeon. Little, Brown & Company, 1990. ISBN 978-0-517-20861-8
- The Best Cat Ever. Little, Brown & Company, 1993. ISBN 0-316-03744-3

The three books were published in one volume in 1995 under the title The Compleat Cat.
