= The Monkey's Raincoat =

1987 detective novel by Robert Crais

- First edition
- Author: Robert Crais
- Language: English
- Series: Elvis Cole series
- Genre: Detective fiction
- Publisher: Bantam
- Publication date: 1987
- Publication place: United States
- Media type: Print (Paperback)
- Pages: 237
- ISBN: 0-553-27585-2
- OCLC: 33271313
- Followed by: Stalking the Angel

The Monkey's Raincoat is a 1987 detective novel by Robert Crais. It is the first in a series of linked novels centering on the private investigator Elvis Cole and his partner Joe Pike. Cole is a tough, wisecracking ex-Ranger with an irresistible urge to do what is morally right. The novel won the 1988 Anthony Award for "Best Paperback Original" at Bouchercon XIX and the 1988 Mystery Readers International Macavity Award for "Best First Novel"; and has since been named one of the 100 Favorite Mysteries of the Century by the Independent Mystery Booksellers Association.

== Explanation of the novel's title ==
The title of the novel derives from a poem by the Japanese poet Matsuo Bashō which is quoted at the start of the novel:

Winter downpour; Even the monkey needs a raincoat.

— Matsuo Bashō, The Monkey's Raincoat

== Plot ==
Ellen and her friend hire Elvis Cole to find her missing husband, Mort, and young son, Perry, who disappeared after Mort was supposed to pick Perry up from school. Ellen is aware of Mort's girlfriend, Kimberly Marsh, who Elvis learns has seemingly disappeared from town. Mort's business associate, Garrett Rice, hasn't seen Mort since a recent Hollywood party. Garrett is rumored to be using cocaine. Ellen's house was burglarized, but she's avoiding police involvement to protect Mort into trouble.

At Ellen's house, Elvis discovers that Mort, a talent agent with a new but failing agency, is likely in financial trouble and that his registered gun is missing. Elvis's investigation is interrupted by a call from the police. Mort was murdered by gunshot in his car. Elvis goes to meet Ellen to tell her something, but she doesn't appear. A woman has been kidnapped from a grocery store parking lot.

Elvis is obsessively watching Kimberly's apartment and stalking a man who collects her mail. He discovers Kimberly in hiding with her boyfriend, Larry, at a house nearby. Kimberly informed Elvis that she and Mort attended a Hollywood party at the lavish home of Dom, a wealthy former bullfighter who could potentially finance a film project. She slept with Dom, causing a major fight among the men at the party. She's in hiding because Mort warned her of danger.

Domingo "Dom" Duran, a former bullfighter with mob ties, orchestrates the kidnapping of Elvis. Dom accuses Mort of stealing his cocaine and is holding Ellen and Perry hostage, demanding Elvis return the drugs to get them back. Elvis tailing a member of Dom's crew, saves Ellen and eliminates two assailants. Dom is still holding the boy. Meanwhile, Garrett Rice is found dead, and Elvis is investigating if he was dealing cocaine. The discovers that drugs from Kimberly's boyfriend, Larry, is also involved in something they are connected to danger. Elvis forcibly takes drugs from Kimberly at the house where she is staying. The person arranges a meeting to trade cocaine for Perry. Dom sends a squad to kill Elvis and Ellen.

Elvis and his partner, and Ellen crash a drug deal at Dom's estate after Elvis escapes a trap, leading to a bloody shootout where they rescue Perry and kill Dom and ten others. The police investigation reveals Mort did not pick up Perry from school as expected. A father was killed while trying to rescue his kidnapped son, armed with his missing gun. Ellen's experiences have made her independent, and she's now ready to face the challenge of raising three children alone.

== Alternative ending ==
Robert Crais' original outline for the novel had Joe Pike getting killed at the end, so that he would have a moment of tragedy that would push Elvis Cole on to the rescue of the boy.

== Awards and nominations ==
- 1988 Anthony Award for "Best Paperback Original"
- 1988 Mystery Readers International Macavity Award for "Best First Novel"
- 1988 Edgar Award nominee for "Best Paperback Original"
- 1988 Shamus Award nominee for "Best Original P.I. Paperback"
