= Lilian Jackson Braun =

American writer

- Born: Lilian Jackson; June 20, 1913 Willimansett, Chicopee, Massachusetts, US
- Died: June 4, 2011 (aged 97) Landrum, South Carolina, US
- Occupation: Novelist
- Period: 1966–2008
- Genre: Mystery

Lilian Jackson Braun (June 20, 1913 – June 4, 2011) was an American writer known for her light-hearted series of The Cat Who... mystery novels. The Cat Who books features newspaper journalist Jim Qwilleran and his two Siamese cats, Koko (short for Kao K'o Kung) and Yum Yum, first in an unnamed midwestern American city and then in the fictitious small town of Pickax located in Moose County "400 miles north of everywhere". Although never explicitly located in the books, the towns, counties, and lifestyles portrayed in the series are generally accepted to be modeled after Bad Axe, Michigan, where Braun resided with her husband until the mid-1980s.

== Life and career ==
Born Lilian Jackson in the Willimansett neighborhood of Chicopee, Massachusetts, to Charles and Clara Ward Jackson, she began her writing career as a teenager after her family moved to Michigan, contributing sports poetry to the Detroit News. She went on to write advertising copy for many Detroit department stores. At the Detroit Free Press she worked 30 years as the "Good Living" editor and retired in 1978. Lilian married her second husband, Earl Bettinger in 1979.

Braun wrote a series of three mystery novels published to critical acclaim from 1966 to 1968: The Cat Who Could Read Backwards, The Cat Who Ate Danish Modern, and The Cat Who Turned On and Off. She resumed writing novels following a nearly twenty-year hiatus, after her retirement from the Detroit Free Press, and in 1986 the Berkley Publishing Group continued the series, and introduced Braun to a new generation, by publishing The Cat Who Saw Red as a paperback original. During the next two years, Berkley released four more Cat Who novels in paperback and reprinted all three from the 1960s. The series rose to the top of some bestseller lists; it reached number two on the New York Times Best Seller list with its 23rd volume The Cat Who Smelled a Rat in 2001. And beginning in 1990, Braun’s books made the New York Times Best Seller List for 20 years in a row. The Los Angeles Times characterized her storytelling voice as being filled with “wonder and whimsy.” The 29th and last completed novel in the series, The Cat Who Had 60 Whiskers was published by Penguin Group in January 2007. Like many writers of her generation, Braun was an admitted technophobe; she wrote all of her books in long hand and then typed them herself. Many of her books have been published as audiobooks narrated by George Guidall, Mason Adams, Christopher Ragland and Theodore Bikel.

Little was known about Braun, who was protective of her private life. Publishers long gave the incorrect birth year of 1916; she was three years older, which remained unknown until she gave her true age during a 2005 interview with the Detroit News. Finally she lived in Tryon, North Carolina, with her second husband of 32 years, Earl Bettinger, and their two cats. Bettinger shared that Braun’s only regret at the end of life was being unable to complete another book she was working on—The Cat Who Smelled Smoke—due to failing health, saying, "She regretted it most of all because so many fans wanted another book." Each of her books from 1990 to 2007 is dedicated to "Earl Bettinger, the Husband Who ...".

Braun died from a lung infection in June 2011, at the Hospice House of the Carolina Foothills in Landrum, South Carolina. She was preceded in death by her first husband, Louis Paul Braun, a sister, Florence Jackson, and a brother, Lloyd Jackson. Earl A. Bettinger (born November 24, 1923) died at the age of 96 on July 20, 2020.

== Legacy ==
Braun’s works have sold worldwide and had been translated into 16 languages by the time of her death in 2011, according to a Penguin Group corporate news release.

In June 2022, Mystery Writers of America (MWA) announced the establishment of the Lilian Jackson Braun Award, to be awarded to the best contemporary cozy mystery book in a modern day setting. Braun left a bequest to MWA that enabled them to fund new projects and programs and MWA chose to honor her career and legacy with the award.

The Columbus Library in Columbus, North Carolina opens its new Lilian Jackson Braun and Earl Bettinger Music Garden June 10, 2023.

== "The Cat Who..." novels ==
1. The Cat Who Could Read Backwards (1966)
2. The Cat Who Ate Danish Modern (1967)
3. The Cat Who Turned On and Off (1968)
4. The Cat Who Saw Red (1986) – nominated for the 1987 Anthony Award and Edgar Award, Best Paperback Original
5. The Cat Who Played Brahms (1987) – nominated for the 1988 Anthony Award, Best Paperback Original
6. The Cat Who Played Post Office (1987)
7. The Cat Who Knew Shakespeare (1988)
8. The Cat Who Sniffed Glue (1988)
9. The Cat Who Went Underground (1989)
10. The Cat Who Talked to Ghosts (1990)
11. The Cat Who Lived High (1990)
12. The Cat Who Knew a Cardinal (1991)
13. The Cat Who Moved a Mountain (1992)
14. The Cat Who Wasn't There (1992)
15. The Cat Who Went into the Closet (1993)
16. The Cat Who Came to Breakfast (1994)
17. The Cat Who Blew the Whistle (1995)
18. The Cat Who Said Cheese (1996)
19. The Cat Who Tailed a Thief (1997)
20. The Cat Who Sang for the Birds (1999)
21. The Cat Who Saw Stars (1999; copyright 1998)
22. The Cat Who Robbed a Bank (2000)
23. The Cat Who Smelled a Rat (2001)
24. The Cat Who Went up the Creek (2002)
25. The Cat Who Brought Down the House (2003)
26. The Cat Who Talked Turkey (2004)
27. The Cat Who Went Bananas (2005)
28. The Cat Who Dropped a Bombshell (2006)
29. The Cat Who Had 60 Whiskers (2007)
30. The Cat Who Smelled Smoke – cancelled by publisher Putnam after Braun's death

=== Short stories ===
1. The Cat Who Had 14 Tales (1988) – 14 stories featuring cats unrelated to The Cat Who...
2. Short & Tall Tales: Moose County Legends Collected by James Mackintosh Qwilleran (2002) – 27 stories
3. The Private Life of the Cat Who...: Tales of Koko and Yum Yum from the Journals of James Mackintosh Qwilleran (2003)
