= The Man Who Hated Banks =

1997 story collection by Michael Gilbert

First edition

The Man Who Hated Banks (full name The Man Who Hated Banks and other mysteries) is a collection of mystery stories by the British thriller writer Michael Gilbert, first published in 1997 by the American company Crippen & Landru. As the back cover of the book tells us, it was "published in honour of the fiftieth anniversary of Michael Gilbert's first book." Gilbert, who was appointed CBE in 1980, was a founder-member of the British Crime Writers' Association. The Mystery Writers of America named him a Grand Master in 1988 and in 1990 he was presented Bouchercon's Lifetime Achievement Award. It has an Introduction by the author and contains 18 of his previously uncollected stories, all of them concerning characters who have figured in other novels and short stories. Seven of the stories feature Chief Inspector Hazlerigg; five Henry Bohun; three Detective Chief Inspector Mercer; and three Detective Inspector Petrella.

== Stories in order ==
- Introduction, page 7, by Michael Gilbert
- Back in Five Years, page 11, told in the first person by Chief Inspector Hazlerigg
- A Neat, Cold Killing, page 19, Chief Inspector Hazlerigg
- Ticker Batson's Last Job, page 26, Chief Inspector Hazlerigg
- Something Like Hard Work, page 33, Chief Inspector Hazlerigg
- Balloons Will Be Released, page 39, Chief Inspector Hazlerigg
- The Awkward Customer, page 49, Chief Inspector Hazlerigg
- Follow the Leader, page 54, Chief Inspector Hazlerigg
- After All These Years, page 59, Henry Bohun
- Every Monday, A New Letter, page 63, Henry Bohun
- An Appealing Pair of Legs, page 68, Henry Bohun, plus a role for Superintendent Hazlerigg
- Money Is Honey, page 73 Henry Bohun, plus a mention of Superintendent Hazlerigg
- The Craven Case, page 94, Henry Bohun
- The Man at the Bottom, page 109, Detective Chief Inspector Mercer, plus a mention of Chief Superintendent Morrissey
- The Man in the Middle, page 128, Detective Chief Inspector Mercer, plus a brief role for Chief Superintendent Morrissey
- The Man at the Top, page 149, Detective Chief Inspector Mercer, plus an important role for Chief Superintendent Morrissey
- The Terrible Mrs. Barker, page 168, Detective Inspector Petrella
- Petrella's Holiday, page 182, Detective Inspector Petrella—Wilfred Wetherall, the protagonist of Fear to Tread, has a small but vital role
- The Man Who Hated Banks, page 208, Detective Inspector Petrella
