= Empty House =

Empty House may refer to:

- "The Adventure of the Empty House", 1903 Sherlock Holmes short story by Arthur Conan Doyle
- "The Empty House", 1906 short story by Algernon Blackwood
- The Empty House (novel), 1978 novel by Michael Gilbert
- "Empty House", 2000 song by Air from The Virgin Suicides
- "Empty Houses", 2007 song by Garry Schyman from BioShock
- "Empty House", 2016 song by Relient K from Air for Free
- "Empty House", 2019 song by Doll Skin from Love Is Dead and We Killed Her
- "Empty House", 2019 song by Low Roar from Ross
- "Empty House", 2020 song by Neck Deep from All Distortions Are Intentional
