= Even Murderers Take Holidays and Other Mysteries =

2007 story collection by Michael Gilbert

First edition

Even Murderers Take Holidays and Other Mysteries is a collection of mystery stories by British thriller writer Michael Gilbert, first published in 2007 by the British company Robert Hale. It contains 25 previously uncollected stories, as well as an introduction by John Cooper and an appendix. The first twelve stories feature Inspector Petrella, one of the many recurring characters that Gilbert created throughout his long career of writing both novels and short stories. Its next story has Mr. Calder and Mr. Behrens, and there are four stories about Inspector Hazlerigg. Gilbert, who was appointed CBE in 1980, was a founder-member of the British Crime Writers' Association. The Mystery Writers of America named him a Grand Master in 1988 and in 1990 he was presented Bouchercon's Lifetime Achievement Award. The stories are mostly set in London and its environs.

== Stories in order ==
- Introduction, page 7, by John Cooper
- The Girl Who Moved, page 10 — Detective Constable Petrella
- Somebody, page 18 — Detective Sergeant Petrella
- Amateur Detective, page 25 — Detective Sergeant Petrella
- Counter Attack, page 35 — Detective Sergeant Petrella
- Deep and Crisp and Even, page 45 — Detective Sergeant Petrella
- It Never Pays to be Too Clever, page 53 — Detective Sergeant Petrella
- Kendrew's Private War, page 58 — Detective Inspector Petrella
- The White Slaves, page 68 — Detective Inspector Petrella, a mention of Wilfred Wetherall
- A Real Born Killer, page 81 — Detective Inspector Petrella, a brief role for Wilfred Wetherall
- Old Mr Martin, page 91 — Detective Inspector Petrella
- The Facts of Life, page 100 — Detective Inspector Petrella, a brief role for Wilfred Wetherall
- The Battle of Bank Street, page 110
- Double, Double, page 124 — Mr. Calder and Mr. Behrens
- Death Duties, page 140
- A Nose in a Million, page 144
- Snuffy, page 153
- Death Money, page 158
- Even Murderers Take Holidays, page 162
- The Drop Shot, page 167
- Cumberland v Cumberland, page 171
- The Indifferent Shot, page 174
- Hangover, page 179
- When A Girl Moves Among Diplomats, page 184
- Twm Carney, page 188
- A Very Special Relationship, page 192
- The Smiler, page 204
- Mrs Haslet's Gone, page 216
- Appendix, page 220
