= The Body of a Girl =

1972 thriller novel by Michael Gilbert

First edition (UK)

The Body of a Girl is a suspense novel by the British author Michael Gilbert published in England by Hodder and Stoughton and in the United States by Harper & Row in 1972. It was Gilbert's 15th novel and falls into the category of police procedurals, although it is undoubtedly more hard-boiled in tone than the usual procedurals. Its protagonist is a new character from Gilbert, the tough Inspector Bill Mercer, and a secondary character, Chief Superintendent Morrissey, also makes his first appearance. Gilbert, who created many series characters over his long career, later used both of them in various short stories.

== Plot ==
Three separate plot elements eventually come together in Body of a Girl. First, New Scotland Yard and high government officials are concerned about an alarming rise in organized gangster activities, particularly from the Crows, and, under the command of Chief Superintendent Morrissey, determine ways to combat it. One step, apparently related to this, involves promoting Inspector Bill Mercer to Chief Inspector and posting him to the small city of Stoneferry on Thames, an upriver station of Q Division of the Metropolitan Police. (Q Division, it will be recalled, was the division in which Gilbert's better-known Inspector Patrick Petrella spent most of his career.)

Not long after arriving in Stoneferry, the tough, scar-faced, and rather enigmatic Mercer becomes a drinking companion of John Bull, the one-armed but extremely rugged proprietor of the town's leading garage; somewhat to the puzzlement of his fellow policemen, Mercer takes a peculiar interest in the operations of the garage and in the history of how it came to have its predominant position on the High Street.

The third component also shows up soon after Mercer's arrival: the discovery on a small island in the Thames of the body of a young woman; she has been completely buried and been there long enough now that only her clothes and bones remain. Mercer, as a divisional detective, takes charge of the investigation, supervising the local uniformed branch. Because of a handbag found buried nearby, it becomes nearly certain that the remains are those of Sweetie Sowthistle, a teenage girl who was a well-known and very well-liked local prostitute and who had suddenly vanished two years earlier. An inquest is called to formally identity the remains but, to the chagrin of the local police (and the apparent indifference of Mercer), evidence is unexpectedly introduced to indicate that the victim was a somewhat older woman who could not have been the missing Sweetie.

A second young woman, the clerk from a local solicitor's office, who also apparently left Stoneferry two years earlier is soon brought into the picture but it proves curiously elusive to determine her actual status: Were those her bones in the sand or had she simply moved to London? While Mercer and his fellow policemen attempt to solve this riddle, Mercer's interest in John Bull's garage continues to grow and, in a sudden change in the narrative flow, the story becomes less of a procedural and more of a study in violence as it pivots back to Superintendent Morrissey and his determination to smash the criminal gang the Crows. In a final, carefully planned ambush of the Crows with a deadly shoot-out in London, Mercer plays a key role, bringing him face to face for a final time with John Bull, the one-armed garage proprietor. And then, on the final page, almost as an anti-climax, we learn the apparent story behind the disappearances of the two Stoneferry girls two years before.
