= The Family Tomb =

1969 suspense novel by Michael Gilbert

First edition under original title (publ. Hodder & Stoughton)

The Family Tomb is a 1969 suspense novel by British mystery and thriller writer Michael Gilbert. It was published by Harper & Row in the United States in 1970 and in 1969, by Hodder and Stoughton in England as The Etruscan Net. It is Gilbert's 14th novel and takes place entirely in Florence, Italy, a few years after the great flood of the Arno river in 1966, which caused serious damage in the city. Gilbert had a great fondness for Italy, which was the setting for a number of his books. One of these is his other well-known novel Death in Captivity, a mystery based on Gilbert's time in an Italian prisoner-of-war camp during World War II.

Apart from Death in Captivity and The Family Tomb, however, most of Gilbert's other books have only a portion of their events taking place in Italy. The Family Tomb occurs entirely within a few miles of the Ponte Vecchio and central Florence.

== Plot ==
Unlike many of Gilbert's novels, which have plots within plots and apparently disparate themes that eventually merge. The Family Tomb is a straightforward suspense story involving only members of the British colony in Florence. They include a wealthy Etruscan professor who excavates and sells ancient art objects, Italian police and judiciary officials, assorted politicians and lawyers, sympathetic Italian working-class people, and two sinister Mafia figures.

The protagonist, Robert Broke, a middle-aged Englishman and expert on Etruscan art, lives in Florence in a state of semi-suspension, having never fully recovered emotionally from the sudden deaths of his wife and child in England several years earlier. He runs a bookstore and art gallery and is on friendly, if somewhat distant terms, with the other members of the British colony. He is attached to his youthful housekeeper and her elderly father, who is a marvellous craftsman excelling at restoring broken antiques. Broke is invited to an elaborate luncheon at the country estate of Professor Bronzini, where excavations into ancient Etruscan tombs are ongoing. Broke encounters the very different members of Bronzini's peculiar household and is shown some of the excavations and ancient tombs. Without quite realizing it, he catches a glimpse of something that he should not have seen—apparently an ancient Etruscan's helmet—and from that point onward his well-being is in danger.

Within a few days, the elderly craftsman who worked for Broke is killed by an apparent hit-and-run driver late one evening—and Broke himself is arrested, put into jail, and accused of killing the man. The rest of the book dwells on attempts by a devoted band of British expatriates to free him and their experience with the Italian legal and political system that weaves its mesh around Broke, and vicious counter-moves by Mafia gangsters who hope to ensure that Broke's arrest will lead to his conviction so that the shadowy deeds taking place on Professor Bronzini's estate are left in peace. Fortunately for Broke, a few Italian officials are less committed to gaining a guilty plea than others. Moreover, an extremely clever local lawyer takes up his case, and on his side is a gilded youth with special talents, who is also the adopted son of Professor Bronzini, and a giant Corsican handyman who works for the Professor. As is frequently the case with Gilbert books, there is a violent dénouement with a satisfactory number of corpses—which leads to a newly found interest in life on the part of Broke.

== Reception ==
The book was released to mixed critical response.

The New York Times described The Family tomb "eminently satisfying", while Kirkus Reviews deemed it, "A tedious, cluttered and overelaborated enterprise" full of "farinaceous nonsense".
