= Anything for a Quiet Life (short story collection) =

1990 collection by Michael Gilbert

First edition (UK)

Anything for a Quiet Life and Other New Mystery Stories is a collection of nine short stories by the British writer Michael Gilbert published in the United Kingdom by Hodder and Stoughton in 1990 and in the United States by Carroll & Graf the same year. Gilbert, who was appointed CBE in 1980, was a founder-member of the British Crime Writers' Association. The Mystery Writers of America named him a Grand Master in 1988 and in 1990 he was presented Bouchercon's Lifetime Achievement Award. All nine stories had previously appeared in Ellery Queen's Mystery Magazine. All of them take place in a fictional English coastal town called Shackleton-on-Sea that is situated in the south of England not far from Brighton and Hove. In spite of Gilbert's usual low-key urbanity in his style, a number of them have an unexpected grimness about them. "Michael was an exceptionally fine storyteller, but he's hard to classify," said one of his British publishers after his death. "He's not a hard-boiled writer in the classic sense, but there is a hard edge to him, a feeling within his work that not all of society is rational, that virtue is not always rewarded.".

== Reception ==
Upon publication, Kirkus Reviews found it to be:

A charming collection of nine stories.... None of these stories is particularly noteworthy for the mystery it presents, but, taken together, they offer a wry commentary on English-village attitudes toward gypsies, Londoners, foreigners, holidayers, tradesmen, country gentry, business partnerships, farmers, small-town nabobs, and the relative discomfort that exists between the police and members of the legal profession.... A companionable way to while away the time... and a clear pleasure for partisans of the cozy.

Sybil Steinberg in Publishers Weekly said, "Though the characters may be two-dimensional and the stories of uneven quality, this collection, overall, delights by virtue of Gilbert's fanciful plotting."

== Main characters and stories ==
The stories feature the activities of a small law firm called Jonas Pickett, Solicitor and Commissioner for Oaths, recently started by Pickett, a man "on the wrong side of sixty".

He was not, as he was fond of explaining to his friends, a retired solicitor. He was a retreating solicitor. Having made as much money as a bachelor of modest habits was likely to use in the rest of his lifetime, but not wishing to rust in idleness, he had abandoned a successful practice in north London and set up a modest office in Shackleton-on-Sea.

There are three other main characters, his partner, Sabrina Mountjoy; their secretary, Claire Easterbrook; and a general handyman, Sam Conybeare, "a mountain of a man who had once performed remarkable feats of strength and daring in a circus." Pickett himself had played a role in an earlier Gilbert novel, The Long Journey Home. Confronted by arcane legal matters, Pickett consults Mountjoy: "She's a much better lawyer than I am."

The stories are all told from the third person omniscient narrator perspective, sometimes with the members of Pickett's law firm playing fairly minor roles. They are written with Gilbert's usual straightforward, urbane, and somewhat detached tone but, as is usual in Gilbert's work, there is often a deceptively hard edge or even grimness to some of the stories. In Holy Writ, for instance, a deranged but nevertheless sympathetically portrayed parson is only narrowly prevented by Pickett and Sam Conybeare from killing his trusting young son in emulation of the Biblical story of Abraham and Isaac. In the final story, The Freedom Folk, an encampment of squatters refuses to heed a warning from Pickett and is carried away to the sea by a flash flood; the fairgrounds strongman, Conybeare, heroically manages to save six of them from the waters, but the other 70 are drowned. By the end of the last story, four years have passed since Pickett first opened his office, he has been elected to the local governing council, and he has retired from practice.

In the first story Mr. Calder, one of the two protagonists of Gilbert's Mr. Calder and Mr. Behrens and Game without Rules, makes a brief appearance. In the same story, Pickett also meets a police superintendent named Queen, as well as a headmaster named Major Appleby. Inspector Queen was a character in many of the Ellery Queen mystery novels by Ellery Queen, and Inspector Appleby was the lead character in many novels by Michael Innes.

In the second story, there is a small role for Chief Superintendent Morrissey, head of the London District Regional Crime Squad, a character in a number of works by Gilbert.

== Stories in order ==
- Anything for a Quiet Life, page 7 — Mr. Calder makes a brief appearance
- Black Bob, page 28
- Vivat Regina, page 50
- The Reign of Terror, page 73
- The Admiral, page 99
- We've Come to Report a Murder, Sir, page 122
- Holy Writ, page 147
- The Bird of Dawning, page 171
- The Freedom Folk, page 197
