= A Pity About the Girl and Other Stories =

2008 story collection by Michael Gilbert

First edition

A Pity About the Girl and Other Stories is a collection of mystery stories by the British thriller writer Michael Gilbert, first published in 2008 by the British company Robert Hale and unpublished in the United States. It contains 14 previously uncollected stories, as well as an introduction by John Cooper and two appendices. Some of the stories feature one or another of Gilbert's many recurring characters that he created throughout his long career of writing both novels and short stories. Gilbert, who was appointed CBE in 1980, was a founder-member of the British Crime Writers' Association. The Mystery Writers of America named him a Grand Master in 1988 and in 1990 he was presented Bouchercon's Lifetime Achievement Award. The locales vary from London to Latin America and the time frame from the present back to the Victorian days of Sherlock Holmes. A number of them, such as the title story, "A Pity About the Girl", and the two concerning Colonel Cristobal Ocampas, have an unexpected grimness about them. "Michael was an exceptionally fine storyteller, but he's hard to classify," said one of his British publishers after his death. "He's not a hard-boiled writer in the classic sense, but there is a hard edge to him, a feeling within his work that not all of society is rational, that virtue is not always rewarded". This is particularly true of the last story in the collection, "By The Pricking of My Thumbs".

== Stories in order ==
- Introduction, page 7, by John Cooper
- A Pity About the Girl, page 11
- The Brave Don't Talk, page 24
- The Man Who Was Reconstituted, page 31 — Elfe has a brief role as Assistant Commissioner and head of Special Branch
- One-tenth Man, page 42
- What Happened at Castelbonato?, page 55 — Henry Bohun has a role and Hargest Macrae a somewhat smaller one
- Camford Cottage, page 97
- Safe!, page 107
- The Revenge of Martin Lucas Field on Colonel Cristobal Ocampas, page 118
- Basilio, page 136 — a second story about Colonel Cristobal Ocampas (see previous story)
- Prize of Santenac, page 158 — a brief appearance by Nap Rumbold
- Villa Almirante, page 165
- The Two Footmen, page 179 — a Sherlock Holmes pastiche
- Trust Little Al, page 195
- By The Pricking of My Thumbs, page 208
- Appendix A, page 221
- Appendix B, page 222
