= Danger Within =

1959 British film by Don Chaffey

- U.S. theatrical release poster
- Directed by: Don Chaffey
- Written by: Bryan Forbes; Frank Harvey
- Based on: Death in Captivity by Michael Gilbert
- Produced by: Colin Lesslie
- Starring: Richard Todd; Bernard Lee; Michael Wilding; Richard Attenborough
- Cinematography: Arthur Grant
- Edited by: John Trumper
- Music by: Francis Chagrin
- Production company: Colin Lesslie Productions
- Distributed by: British Lion Films
- Release date: 17 February 1959 (London)
- Running time: 101 minutes
- Country: United Kingdom
- Language: English
- Budget: £178,111

Danger Within (U.S. title: Breakout) is a 1959 British war film directed by Don Chaffey and starring Richard Todd and Bernard Lee. It was written by Bryan Forbes and Frank Harvey, based on the 1952 novel Death in Captivity by Michael Gilbert, who had been a prisoner of war held by the Italians at PG 49 in Fontanellato. A combination of POW escape drama and whodunit, the film set in a prisoner of war camp in Northern Italy during the summer of 1943.

== Plot ==
A well-planned escape attempt, which seemed guaranteed to work, ends in disaster. Within seconds of leaving the POW camp, the would-be escapee, cleverly disguised as sadistic Capitano Benucci, is caught and killed by the real Capitano Benucci. This incident is witnessed by the other prisoners, who notice that Benucci seemed to be waiting for the escapee to arrive before shooting him dead in cold blood.

Afterwards, the escape committee, led by Lieutenant Colonel David Baird, is convinced that there is an informer within their ranks. The prime suspect is a Greek officer, Lieutenant Coutoules. However, when Coutoules is found dead in an escape tunnel, suspicions that there is a traitor living among the POWs die down. In an effort to explain away his death to the Italian captors, Coutoules' body is placed in an abandoned escape tunnel within the camp and the Italians are informed he was suffocated by a roof fall.

Based on fingerprint evidence, Benucci charges Captain Roger Byfold with the murder of Coutoules. It is obvious to the POWs that, although Byfold is completely innocent, Benucci will ensure he is found guilty and executed. The escape committee develops a desperate plan to get Byfold and two other officers out of the camp before Byfold goes on trial. The three POWs scale the camp fence with a ladder constructed from two rugby posts. However, Benucci and his men are concealed just outside the fence with a machine gun mounted on the back of a truck, and the three escapees are promptly mowed down by a hail of bullets. This is the second time Benucci has deliberately killed escaping POWs in cold blood, even though it would have been easy to capture them alive.

The escape committee realises that Benucci knew when and where the three POWs planned to escape and had positioned himself in the best place to ambush them. The only logical explanation is that there really is a traitor among the POWs, who has betrayed them by passing information to Benucci. That also means that Benucci must already know about another tunnel they are working on, intended for a mass escape of POWs. The prisoners realise that Benucci could easily intervene to prevent the next escape attempt from taking place, if he wanted to. They assume that Benucci prefers to let preparations continue so the informer can tell him the date and time of the escape, allowing Benucci to wait at the other end of the tunnel to machine-gun as many POWs as he can.

The race is on to find the informer, and for the rest of the inmates to escape en masse before the camp is handed over to the Nazis, following the Italian Armistice. The escape plan, devised by Lieutenant Colonel Huxley, is for the prisoners to make their escape during the day, under the cover of a production of Hamlet in the theatre hut by a group of POWs led by Captain Rupert Callender. They assume that Benucci would never expect the POWs to attempt an escape in broad daylight.

== Cast ==
- Richard Todd as Lieutenant Colonel David Baird
- Bernard Lee as Lieutenant Colonel Huxley
- Michael Wilding as Major Charles Marquand
- Richard Attenborough as Captain 'Bunter' Phillips
- Dennis Price as Captain Rupert Callender
- Donald Houston as Captain Roger Byfold
- William Franklyn as Captain Tony Long
- Vincent Ball as Captain Pat Foster
- Peter Arne as Capitano Benucci
- Peter Jones as Captain Alfred Piker
- Ronnie Stevens as Lieutenant Meynell, 'The Sewer Rat'
- Terence Alexander as Lieutenant Gibbs
- Andrew Faulds as Lieutenant Commander 'Dopey' Gibbon, R.N.
- Steve Norbert as Lieutenant Pierre Dessin
- Cyril Shaps as Lieutenant Cyriakos Coutoules
- Eric Lander as Lieutenant Tim O'Brien
- John Dearth as Lieutenant Robson
- Robert Bruce as 'Doc' Simmonds, R.A.M.C.
- Harold Siddons as Captain 'Tag' Burchnall
- Ian Whittaker as 2nd Lieutenant Betts-Hanger
- Michael Caine as POW (uncredited)

== Production ==
The film was inspired by escape involving producer Colin Lesslie. Richard Todd agreed to make the film in part because he was attracted to true war stories. Todd tried to make a sequel about Lesslie's adventures in Italy but no film resulted.

Locations for the film were Chobham Common, Surrey and Shepperton Studios.

== Reception ==
The Monthly Film Bulletin wrote: "After an initial cheap, and pointless joke, sustained through the titles, the film's merits of ingenuity and tight construction soon take firm hold, while the atmosphere of camp life is established with economy and insight. If attention tends to slacken during moments of crisis, this is mainly because of a certain too-familiar reliance on the virtues of understatement. This, and one other flaw – a sadistic Italian officer given only one-dimensional characterisation – narrowly detracts from the film's considerable sense of style. Bernard Lee's solid and thoughtful performance stands out in a generally workmanlike cast."

In British Sound Films: The Studio Years 1928–1959 David Quinlan rated the film as "good", writing: "Although some way behind Stalag 17, film carries a good share of tension, excitement and humour."

The Radio Times Guide to Films gave the film 3/5 stars, writing: "Anyone who has seen Billy Wilder's PoW-camp classic Stalag 17 will find this workmanlike British imitation somewhat predictable. The story has a whodunnit element that is cleverly and wittily plotted, but prisoners and guards alike are cardboard cutouts and it takes some competent character acting to make them even half credible. Richard Attenborough and Bernard Lee come off best, while Richard Todd trots out all his gruff officer mannerisms. Director Don Chaffey sustains the suspense with unfussy ease."

Leslie Halliwell said: "Escape plans of officers in a prisoner-of-war camp are threatened by an informer. Familiar comedy and melodrama with an added whodunnit element, smartly handled and very entertaining."

== See also ==
- Stalag 17 (similar war film involving an informer inside an American POW camp)
