= The Doors Open =

1962 mystery novel by Michael Gilbert

First edition

The Doors Open, published by Hodder and Stoughton in England in 1949 and by Walker and Company in the United States in 1962, is the third novel by the British mystery and thriller writer Michael Gilbert. Gilbert, who was appointed CBE in 1980, was a founder-member of the British Crime Writers' Association. The Mystery Writers of America named him a Grand Master in 1988 and in 1990 he was presented Bouchercon's Lifetime Achievement Award. Like his first two books, it features Inspector Hazlerigg, although not in a major role. It is, in fact, a very diffuse book in terms of its characters. Angus McMann, who was the chief protagonist of Gilbert's previous book, They Never Looked Inside, is briefly mentioned on the first page and makes a later appearance as a minor character. Hazlerigg does not appear until page 24 and thereafter only at intervals throughout the book. There are, in actuality, three other protagonists who, along with Hazlerigg, share the role of driving the narrative. One is Noel Anthony Pontarlier Rumbold ("Nap"), a junior solicitor in his father's London firm. Nap had spent four months on dangerous missions with the French maquis in occupied France during the war and is, apparently, still a Lieutenant-Colonel, D.S.O. A few years later he will be a main character in Gilbert's well-received novel Death Has Deep Roots. Patrick (Paddy) Yeatman-Carter, an acquaintance of Nap's, is another lead character, as is his uncle, Alfred Lord Cedarbrook, a man with an astonishing background, much sought after by both the Foreign Office and the War Office during WWII and now, apparently, still affiliated with the Secret Service. As well as being a linguist, explorer, soldier, and diplomat, he also has a law degree. All three of them, to one degree or another, carry out private investigations, sometimes with the backing of Hazlerigg, sometimes not.

== Plot and Title ==
Stripped of all narrative complications, the basic story is simple. First Yeatman-Carter, then Nap, and finally Cedarbrook, become suspicious of the activities of a venerable, well-known London insurance company that is now being run, unbeknownst to its august Board of Directors, in a fraudulent manner by its manager, James Legate. Although Legate is actually a long-time, clandestine Communist, possibly even a Soviet agent, Legate is a competent businessman who has made Stalagmite into an important company while making himself a very wealthy man. He is, however, in actuality, defrauding the company, knowingly bringing it close to financial ruin, and feathering his own nest in the process. As Paddy, Nap, and Cedarbrook try to determine what is actually happening, Legate takes ruthless action to defend his position, instigating at least two murders and attempting to kill, or at least seriously injure all three of the amateur investigators. Legate represents a recurring character in many of Gilbert's novels: an apparently upright, prosperous businessman who is actually either the secret head of a criminal organization or simply a dishonest and highly corrupt man of affairs.

In a Prologue to the novel, we are given an example of incongruous cause and supposed effect and are told that this aptly describes the events to follow. This may be true, but it may not be apparent to all readers.

== Reception and/or Later Appraisals ==
The New York Times did not review it upon its American publication in 1962 and there are no discernible British reviews. The only easily found appraisal is in Barzun and Taylor's encyclopedic Catalogue of Crime:

The author's least satisfactory work. The usually competent Inspector Hazlerigg stays on the sidelines while a pair of male amateurs (too reminiscent of the bright young things of the thirties) look into possible crookedness in a large insurance firm, thus inviting the usual sequence of non-fatal retaliation.
