= The Unstoppable Man =

1960 British film by Terry Bishop

- Directed by: Terry Bishop
- Written by: Terry Bishop; Alun Falconer; Paddy Manning O'Brine
- Based on: The short story Amateur in Violence by Michael Gilbert
- Produced by: John Pellatt
- Starring: Cameron Mitchell; Marius Goring
- Cinematography: Arthur Grant
- Edited by: Antony Gibbs (as Anthony Gibbs)
- Music by: Bill McGuffie
- Production company: Argo Film Productions
- Distributed by: Anglo-Amalgamated Film Distributors (UK)
- Release date: 1960
- Running time: 68 minutes
- Country: United Kingdom
- Language: English

The Unstoppable Man is a 1960 British second feature crime drama film directed by Terry Bishop and starring Cameron Mitchell, Harry H. Corbett, Marius Goring and Lois Maxwell. It was written by Bishop, Alun Falconer and Paddy Manning O'Brine based on the 1973 short story Amateur in Violence by Michael Gilbert.

== Plot ==
A gang of criminals kidnaps the son of James Kennedy, who is an American executive of a London-based chemical company.

Kennedy ignores the advice of Inspector Hazelrigg of Scotland Yard to try a plan of his own. He wants to act without the police. The father wants to pay any ransom and simply make a business deal. He doubles the ransom amount expecting the thieves to have a falling-out over how to divide it. Rocky steals part of the money and is indeed killed for it. Evidence at the crime scene leads Kennedy to a home in Hampstead where the mastermind, Feist, is keeping Kennedy's son.

Hazelrigg comes along for a second ransom payment but agrees to give Kennedy a few minutes to enter the house alone. Armed with a flamethrower, Kennedy is able to take his son to safety while the police close in on Feist.

== Cast ==
- Cameron Mitchell as James Kennedy
- Marius Goring as Inspector Hazelrigg
- Harry H. Corbett as Feist
- Lois Maxwell as Helen Kennedy
- Denis Gilmore as Jimmy Kennedy
- Humphrey Lestocq as Sergeant Plummer
- Ann Sears as Pat Delaney
- Timothy Bateson as Rocky
- Kenneth Cope as Benny
- Brian Rawlinson as Moonlight Jackson
- Tony Quinn as Casey
- Tony Doonan as Alan
- Susan Denny as Milly* Jean Marlow as May
- Edward Harvey as Lewis
- Emrys Leyshon as lab assistant
- Tony Hawes as TV interviewer
- Alan Edwards as Station Constable
- John Baker as reporter
- Liza Page as club girl
- Donald Auld as doorman
- Graham Stewart as taxi driver

== Critical reception ==
In a contemporary review, Monthly Film Bulletin said "For its size and type, this is a creditable little production. Though in the familiar tradition of British second feature crime thrillers, it has the benefit of a Michael Gilbert story which, though unconvincing in some of its details, offers an intriguing exercise in detection. The characters are sharply drawn, Terry Bishop's direction – apart from a slow middle section – is slick and resourceful, and the authentic backgrounds heighten impact. Cameron Mitchell makes a strong impression as the businessman, while Marius Goring as the Inspector and Harry H. Corbett as the kidnapper give quieter but equally competent performances."
