= Into Battle =

Into Battle may refer to:

- Into Battle (novel), a 2001 Australian novel by Garth Nix
- Into Battle (play), 2021 play by Hugh Simon
- Into Battle (thriller), a 1997 historical thriller by the British writer Michael Gilbert
- "Into Battle" (poem), a 1915 British war poem by Julian Grenfell
- Into Battle with the Art of Noise, 1983 debut album by British synthpop band the Art of Noise
- Into Battle, 1984 debut album by heavy metal band Brocas Helm
