= Inspector Bill Mercer =

Inspector Bill Mercer is a detective created by the British crime and mystery writer Michael Gilbert. He is the leading character in the 1972 novel The Body of a Girl, a somewhat hardboiled police procedural, and appears later in at least three short stories. On the first page of the novel, "Detective Inspector William Mercer received... confirmation of his promotion to chief inspector and his appointment in charge of the CID at Stoneferry on Thames, which is one of the larger upriver stations of Q Division of the Metropolitan Police."

Gilbert goes on to say that "He was a man in his late twenties or early thirties, with a lot of dark hair, worn rather long,, and a thick, sensual face. His appearance was not improved by a puckered white scar which started at the cheekbone and gathered up the corner of the left eye so that it seemed permanently half closed. He had thick shoulders, a barrel of a chest, and legs disproportionately long for such a body". In the novel, mention is made of the many girls he has known and discarded over the years, and he carries out a smooth seduction of a beautiful young girl in the course of his investigation. But in the three short stories, which take place over an extended period of time, he is living with, and apparently faithful to, a beautiful Pakistani girl named Shallini whom he had brought back from his time in Bahrain. At the stories' conclusion, he is planning a trip to Pakistan with her at the Treasury's expense.

As Gilbert later described him in an introduction to a 1997 collection of stories: "He once shared with Hazlerigg the rank of Chief Inspector, but this is about the only thing that he did share. While Hazlerigg plays the game according to the rules, Mercer is prepared to bend any rule that gets in the way of his single-minded pursuit of his objective.... He was going to get his revenge for that scar, whatever the cost.

== Short story appearances ==
Mercer was the ruthless protagonist of three connected, and rather grim, stories that appeared in Ellery Queen's Mystery Magazine in the issues of April, May, and June of 1979. They were called "The Man at the Bottom," "The Man in the Middle," and "The Man at the Top." Mercer's precise status in the three stories is murky. He is living an apparently hand-to-mouth existence in a bare flat in London and goes to work, at the bottom, for what is obviously a gang of highly organized and highly dangerous criminals. As the head criminal, a Mr. Henderson, sums up Mercer's two previous years when he is first being taken in on probation: He was dismissed from the Metropolitan Police for assault on a prisoner; he was allowed to join the police force of the Ruler of Bahrain but soon dismissed for bribery and corruption; returned to England and worked as a laborer but was dismissed for assaulting a foreman; and finally worked as a protector for criminals smuggling hard pornography into England.

By the end of the three stories, it is still impossible to tell what his motivating force has been throughout the series and whether or he has been successfully infiltrated into Henderson's gang as a long-term mole by New Scotland Yard's tough, ruthless, and cunning Chief Superintendent Morrissey. In the final story he is definitely working in coordination with the police, but in the first two this is far from clear.
