= Mr. Calder and Mr. Behrens (book) =

1982 story collection by Michael Gilbert

- First US edition 1982
- Author: Michael Gilbert
- Language: English
- Genre: Short stories
- Publisher: Harper & Row (US); Hodder & Stoughton (UK)
- Publication date: 1982 (UK and US)
- Publication place: United Kingdom
- Media type: Print
- Preceded by: Game Without Rules

First UK edition 1982

Mr. Calder and Mr. Behrens is a 1982 short story collection by the British crime and spy writer Michael Gilbert featuring his eponymous counter-intelligence agents. It was published by Hodder & Stoughton in the UK and by Harper & Row in the US. The book was Gilbert's second collection of Calder and Behrens stories, following Game Without Rules (1967).

== Stories ==
The book contains the following stories, all originally published in Ellery Queen's Mystery Magazine:

- "The Twilight of the Gods"
- "Emergency Exit"
- "One-to-Ten"
- "The Peaceful People"
- "The Lion and the Virgin"
- "The African Tree Beavers"
- "Signal Tresham"
- "The Mercenaries"
- "Early Warning"
- "The Killing of Michael Finnegan"
- "The Decline and Fall of Mr. Behrens"
- "The Last Reunion"

== Literary criticism ==
Kirkus Reviews called the stories "a tidy assortment" for those who enjoy leisurely, literate espionage vignettes, even though few are plausible and the humour "sometimes dry to the point of invisibility".

== Adaptations ==
A series of twenty radio plays by Gilbert under the general title Game without Rules was broadcast by BBC Radio 2 between October 1968 and January 1969, including the following derived from stories collected in this anthology:

- "In Which Mr Calder Acquires a Dog" (adapted from "Emergency Exit")
- "The Peaceful People"
- "One-to-Ten"
- "The African Tree Beavers"
- "The Lion and the Virgin"
- "Ahmed and Ego" (adapted from "The Decline and Fall of Mr. Behrens")
- "The Mercenaries"
- "Signal Tresham"
