= Young Petrella =

1987 story collection by Michael Gilbert

First edition (UK)

Young Petrella is a collection of 16 short stories about the British policeman Patrick Petrella by the British writer Michael Gilbert published in the United Kingdom by Hodder and Stoughton in 1987 and in the United States by Harper & Row the same year.

== Content ==
All of the stories except one had previously appeared in the British magazine Argosy. In addition to the stories themselves, there is an introduction written Gilbert specifically for the book. The first story in the book, "The Conspirators", concerns an 11-year old Petrella; the rest are about his early career as a policeman in London, first as a detective constable, then as a detective sergeant. An earlier collection of stories, Petrella at Q, had been published ten years before, in 1977, but consisted of stories about Petrella's later years on the force, when he was first a detective inspector and then a detective chief inspector. As usual with Gilbert, in spite of his smooth, urbane style, some of the stories take an unexpectedly grim turn, "Lost Leader", in particular, which begins with a group of teen-aged boys playing Robin Hood and comes to a harsh conclusion.

== Analysis ==
"Michael was an exceptionally fine storyteller, but he's hard to classify," said one of his British publishers after his death. "He's not a hard-boiled writer in the classic sense, but there is a hard edge to him, a feeling within his work that not all of society is rational, that virtue is not always rewarded.".

== Stories in order ==
- Introduction, page 7 — by Michael Gilbert
- PROLOGUE
  - The Conspirators, page 11 — Petrella is 11 years old in this story
- DETECTIVE CONSTABLE
  - Who Has Seen the Wind?, page 31
  - The Prophet and the Bird, page 38
  - Nothing Ever Happens on Highside, page 47
  - Cash in Hand, page 55
  - Source Seven, page 65 — Inspector Hazlerigg has a role
  - The Night the Cat Stayed Out, page 79
- DETECTIVE SERGEANT
  - Breach of the Peace, page 93
  - Voyage into Illusion, page 103 — Inspector Hazlerigg has a role
  - The Oyster Catcher, page 116
  - Dangerous Structure, page 130
  - Death Watch, page 140
  - Lost Leader, page 150 — Wilfred Wetherall has a brief appearance
  - The Coulman Handicap, page 166
  - The Sark Lane Mission, page 184
  - Paris in Summer, page 207
