= Ring of Terror (novel) =

1995 suspense novel by Michael Gilbert

First edition (UK)

Ring of Terror is a mystery-suspense novel by the British crime writer Michael Gilbert, first published in the United Kingdom in 1995 by Hodder and Stoughton and in the United States by Carroll & Graf. It was Gilbert's 28th novel and the first of three featuring his final set of recurring characters, Luke Pagan and Joe Narrabone. Set in the reign of Edward VII, during the first decade of the 20th century, it was also the first of Gilbert's historical mysteries. Along with its fictional characters and situations, there are references to actual events of the time, such as the Siege of Sidney Street, and Winston Churchill plays a minor role as Home Secretary. Gilbert, who was appointed CBE in 1980, was a founder-member of the British Crime Writers' Association. The Mystery Writers of America named him a Grand Master in 1988 and in 1990 he was presented Bouchercon's Lifetime Achievement Award.

== Plot ==
The book's events take place in Gilbert's usual locale of London and, to a lesser degree, the English countryside. Luke and Joe are both country boys, one the son of a gamekeeper of a landed gentleman, the other the son of a poacher. Both are therefore expert at tracking and hunting for prey. Close friends in spite of their very different natures and levels of education, they have become London policemen at an early age. Because Luke has learned Russian and French and has an ear for other languages, he is soon recruited by various authorities to help in their battle against an increasing number of émigré anarchists, criminals, and terrorists now causing considerable problems in the metropolitan London area. By the end of the book Luke has been asked to join the recently formed MO5 (later renamed MI5), a counter-intelligence agency, and Joe, in spite of losing part of a leg to a terrorist's bomb, has secured a good job as a security guard.

== Reviews ==
From Publishers Weekly, which writes pre-publication reviews for the publishing industry and libraries:

Set more along the lines of a lean spy novel than a police procedural, veteran Gilbert's latest propels young Luke Pagan and Joe Narrabone of the Metropolitan Police into a web of complex geopolitics one year before the outbreak of WWI. As trouble-making Russian immigrants spread terror throughout Edwardian London... the two coppers track three suspected Russian revolutionaries, the Home Office seems to put politics over police work, even when the naked corpse of an immigrant bearing the notice "Let Authority beware" is found hanging in Victoria Park. Leave it to Gilbert to keep readers hooked while making his tale reverberate with all kinds of historical chords, including the invention of dynamite and the beginning of the modern intelligence agency.

From Booklist:

As usual in Gilbert's always entertaining period mysteries, the atmosphere is palpable, the protagonist is admirable if just a bit naive, and the plot moves quickly and logically. Toss in a bit of sly humor, and one has a thoroughly enjoyable, intelligent crime novel. The conclusion lends itself to the hope of further Luke Pagan adventures. Wes Lukowsky
