= Patrick Petrella =

- First appearance: Blood and Judgement (1959)
- Last appearance: The Facts of Life (2007)
- Created by: Michael Gilbert
- Portrayed by: Peter Gilmore; Philip Jackson

In-universe information
- Gender: Male
- Title(s): Detective Sergeant, Detective Inspector, Superintendent
- Occupation: Police detective
- Family: Gregorio Petrella (father); Mirabel Trentham-Foster (mother)
- Spouse: Jane Orfrey
- Children: Donald Petrella
- Nationality: British

Patrick Petrella is a fictional police detective created by the British mystery writer Michael Gilbert who appears in ten books published between 1959 and 2003 and is probably the best-known of the half-dozen or so recurring characters that Gilbert wrote about throughout his long career. He is the protagonist of two novels and of 54 short stories that were first published in magazines and newspapers and then republished in eight collections of stories. In one of the short stories, however, "The Spoilers", in Game Without Rules, featuring Mr. Calder and Mr. Behrens as the protagonists, he appears only very briefly, at the end of the story. In his first appearance in a novel, the 1959 police procedural Blood and Judgement, Petrella is a "probationary" Detective Sergeant at the (fictional) Q Division of the London Metropolitan Police. By the final novel in the series, Roller Coaster, he has worked his way up to become a Superintendent.

== Creation ==
Gilbert attributes reading the poem Who Has Seen The Wind? by Christina Rossetti during a boring church sermon as the inspiration for the first Petrella mystery. The lines "But when the leaves hang trembling, the wind is passing through" caused Gilbert to suddenly visualize a young policeman "who read and could quote poetry" visiting a working-class family who are trembling and uncommunicative because the father, an escaped convict, is hiding in the kitchen, and the policeman suddenly realizes why.

== Background and appearance ==
As his name indicates, Petrella is the offspring of different nationalities. His father, Lieutenant of Police Gregorio Petrella, was in the Spanish equivalent of England's Special Branch when he met Petrella's British mother, Mirabel Trentham-Foster, in front of the pyramids in Egypt. Lieutenant Petrella, whose primary job was to prevent Spain's dictator, Francisco Franco, from assassination, spoke a number of languages and was often sent abroad to investigate possible conspiracies against Franco. On one of these missions he met Miss Trentham-Foster, who was sketching the pyramids. She was the daughter of an English architect and the granddaughter of a judge "who was also an accomplished painter." Patrick spent the first seven years of his life running around with great freedom with other Spanish boys his own age. On his eighth birthday, however, his mother "put her small foot down" and began the process that would launch him "into the traditional educational system of the English middle and upper class." So he spent the next nine years at English boarding schools. At the age of 17 his father, by now a Colonel, sent him to the American University in Beirut, where he learned to speak Arabic, then to another "rather peculiar" one in Cairo, where, among other things, he learned to pick locks. His ambition had always been to be a policeman; on his 21st birthday he joined the Metropolitan Police as a Constable. After training, he was first posted to the North London Division of Highside.

Bilingual in English and Spanish, Petrella speaks at least three other languages: Arabic; German; and French at least well enough to pass for a Belgian when in France. In Young Petrella he says to a fellow policeman: "I speak French better than Spanish... We all moved to Bordeaux when I was six. That's a good age for picking up a language, because you don't forget it again easily." This contradicts other information about his early life from other sources, so it may be that he was not being entirely factual about it.

In "Petrella's Holiday" we learn something about his appearance: a saleslady who describes him with "an accuracy which suggested she had looked at him more than once" says he has "Dark black hair, young-looking, a brown face, very deep blue eyes."

In the 1964 story "The Man Who Hated Banks" he is in Germany on a job and at one point speaks "impeccable German". During the course of that investigation he has a young and attractive clerical assistant named Jane Orfrey who turns out to be the niece of the Assistant Commissioner—and in the last paragraph their engagement is announced. They later have a son named Donald.

== Character ==
In Blood and Judgement Petrella is young and, apparently, not very experienced in his non-professional dealings with women. He lodges at Mrs. Catt's, who cooks large meals for his youthful appetite. He drinks sparingly and is a dedicated bridge player. Very little of his personality or background come through in the first book; he is apparently fit and athletic but beyond that we learn nothing of his physical appearance or personality. We are told early on that he is considered by his superiors to be something of a maverick with a streak of somewhat unruly independence; as the book progresses he is shown to have a very strong and very stubborn sense of right and wrong—although he is a dedicated policeman to his core, with a strong sense of belonging to its brotherhood, he nevertheless goes behind his superior's back to unearth evidence that he feels is being unwarrantedly ignored. The only other thing we learn about him in this book, although he is the protagonist who appears in nearly all of its scenes, is that his surname is Spanish. In a 1959 short story, "Petrella's Holiday", published about the same time as Blood and Judgement, his upstairs neighbor and friend is Wilfred Wetherall, a schoolmaster who is the protagonist of Gilbert's 1953 novel Fear to Tread.

We are initially told that from his English heritage Petrella had derived "an abstract notion of what was fair and what was unfair." Combined with "a Spanish temper" it was "an explosive mixture capable of blowing [him] out of "the carefully regulated ranks of the Metropolitan Police." This is clearly demonstrated in the final story in Petrella at Q, in which Augie the Pole, a vicious London gangster who enjoys flaying his enemies alive, incautiously seeks to dissuade Petrella from an investigation by kidnapping his four-year-old son. Accompanied by fellow officers on an informal mission, Petrella locates the Pole and, armed with a knife, leads him away into the depths of a darkened warehouse. Upon hearing a scream a while later, one of the policemen remarks,

"Augie made a mistake there. The Skipper's half Spanish. It's the Spanish half that's operating just now." The second scream was muffled, as if it was made through folds of thick cloth.

The boy is located and rescued—and Augie the Pole meets a violent end at the hands of a rival gang.

== Appearances by Petrella ==
=== In novels ===
- Blood and Judgement (1959) — introduction of Detective Sergeant Petrella.
- Roller-Coaster (1993) — he is now Superintendent Petrella

=== In collections of short stories ===
- Game Without Rules (1968) — in one story he makes a brief appearance as Superintendent Petrella
- Stay of Execution (1971) — in one story he is Detective Inspector Petrella
- Amateur in Violence (Davis Publications, 1973) — in four stories he is Detective Inspector Petrella
- Petrella at Q (1977) — in 12 stories
- Young Petrella (1988) — in 16 stories
- The Man Who Hated Banks (1997) — in three stories he is Detective Inspector Petrella
- The Curious Conspiracy (Crippen & Landru, 2002) — in two stories he is Detective Sergeant Petrella, in one story Detective Inspector Petrella
- Even Murderers Take Holidays and Other Mysteries (2007) — in 12 stories

=== On the radio ===
Peter Gilmore voiced Petrella in four BBC radio plays in 1976, followed by a fifth in 1979.

From 1997 to 2001, BBC Radio 4 broadcast two series of radio plays adapted from the books with Petrella played by Philip Jackson.
