= Fear to Tread =

1953 thriller novel by Michael Gilbert

- First edition (UK)
- Author: Michael Gilbert
- Language: English
- Publication date: 1953

Fear to Tread is a mystery–crime thriller by the British mystery writer Michael Gilbert, first published in 1953 by Hodder and Stoughton in England and by Harper & Brothers in the United States. Set mostly in London, it was his seventh novel in six years and built upon the favourable reputation he had achieved earlier with the well-received Smallbone Deceased and Death Has Deep Roots. Gilbert, who was appointed CBE in 1980, was a founder-member of the British Crime Writers' Association. The Mystery Writers of America named him a Grand Master in 1988 and in 1990 he was presented Bouchercon's Lifetime Achievement Award. It is one of numerous stories and novels by Gilbert presenting a gritty, realistic depiction of organized gangs, frequently directed by a deeply concealed mastermind who is not unearthed until the final pages.

== Main character ==
Its main character is Wilfred Wetherall, a middle-aged, mild-mannered headmaster of "an understaffed, overpopulated secondary school for boys in the south-east of London." To further emphasize the apparently unheroic nature of the protagonist, throughout the book the third-person, omniscient narrator refers to him as "Mr. Wetherall". Chief Superintendent Hazlerigg plays an important role in the book but does not appear until page 154 of the 223-page British edition.

== Plot ==
The book's plot is the gradual discovery by Mr. Wetherall that even a number of years after the end of World War II there is a flourishing black market in London for rationed food and other items, most of them stolen by one gang or another and then "redistributed" for their profit to restaurateurs and catering services. The gangs responsible for these activities are directed by a well-concealed master criminal and all of them are totally ruthless when it comes to protecting their identities. Mr. Wetherall becomes more and more aware of the black marketing from dealing with both some of his youthful students and with his staff and their relatives. As he gets caught up in their developments, threats and warnings are increasingly directed at him. A deeply stubborn streak that refuses to let him be unfairly pushed around, as well as his innate sense of fair play, keep him getting further and further involved. At first he seeks allies from a powerful newspaper editor and then, at last, from Superintendent Hazlerigg.

== Appraisal ==
In a long, admiring article about Gilbert in The New York Times by the mystery writer Amanda Cross, she writes that:

His heroes fight without hope of reward, because they hate bullying; they honor, albeit with regret, the slow processes of democracy and law; they are loyal to those who have fought at their side, and they do not think trust a mug's game. In short, his characters embody the virtues of the class-ridden but romantic public school tradition.

This sums up Mr. Wetherall and his battle with the underworld.

== Characteristics ==
Characteristic of much of Gilbert's work over the next half-century is his use in this book of teen-aged boys as important characters—in this he is practically unique in the field: very few of his peers' works have any characters except adults. Also characteristic of his other works is the growing blackness he brings to the story as it progresses. What begins in a rather innocuous way becomes darker and grimmer as the events unfold in sometimes surprising ways. As one of his editors said after Gilbert's death in 2006, "He's not a hard-boiled writer in the classic sense, but there is a hard edge to him, a feeling within his work that not all of society is rational, that virtue is not always rewarded.". Such is the case here.
