= Close Quarters (Gilbert) =

1947 mystery novel by Michael Gilbert

First edition

Close Quarters is the first novel by the British mystery writer Michael Gilbert. Published in England by Hodder and Stoughton in 1947, it did not appear in the United States until 1963. By then Gilbert's reputation had been firmly established in both countries and his regular American publisher for many years had been Harper & Brothers. Close Quarters, however, was published by Walker and Company, a less prestigious house. In it we are introduced to Chief Inspector Hazlerigg, who will go on to be a recurring character in a number of Gilbert's works throughout the next ten years. Gilbert, who was appointed CBE in 1980, was a founder-member of the British Crime Writers' Association. The Mystery Writers of America named him a Grand Master in 1988 and in 1990 he was presented Bouchercon's Lifetime Achievement Award.

== Golden Age conventions ==
A series of deaths, the first one an apparent accident, takes place in the normally quiet cathedral town of Welchester, more particularly within the "Close" of the 500-year old cathedral itself, "Close" being the English word for the precincts of a cathedral. "Educated at Blundell’s, a well-known private school, and London University, Gilbert had a short spell as a schoolteacher before the Second World War.... By then his enthusiasm for detective fiction had prompted him to start work on Close Quarters... conceived in the spirit of Golden Age mystery writing." Golden Age mysteries had been popularized throughout the 1930s by writers such as Agatha Christie, Dorothy L. Sayers, and Michael Innes and had informally created a number of conventions that are to be found in Close Quarters.

The setting here is the tightly limited confines of the cathedral Close and those few houses within its exterior walls, much as many Golden Age stories were set in isolated country houses; two full pages are devoted to a complete cast of the "householders" inhabiting the Close; the main characters (and suspects) are strictly limited to those ecclesiastics living within these confines; we have three full-page diagrams showing the grounds of the Close with its cathedral and houses; an inspector and detective sergeant are sent down from Scotland Yard to conduct the inquiries; a loving imitation of a London Times crossword puzzle is presented, along with its recondite clues, and is the subject of an entire chapter, with three iterations of the puzzle itself being shown as it is gradually filled in by two of the story's scholarly characters; there is much leisurely description of the cathedral, the neighboring houses, and of the characters themselves; and there is one lengthy red herring in which the detective sergeant follows two of the suspects to London to no great purpose. And finally, of course, Inspector Hazlerigg deduces the identity of the murderer, contrives to trick him into an incriminating act, and then explains all of the story's most baffling events to a gathering of the surviving characters.

== Characteristics ==
Characteristic of much of Gilbert's work over the next half-century is his use of teen-aged boys as relatively important characters—in this he is practically unique in the field: in very few of his peers' works are any characters except adults shown. Also characteristic of his works to come is the growing blackness he brings to the story as it progresses. What begins here as a relatively light-hearted depiction of the Close and its ecclesiastic inhabitants becomes darker and grimmer as the events unfold in sometimes surprising ways. As one of his editors said after Gilbert's death in 2006, "He's not a hard-boiled writer in the classic sense, but there is a hard edge to him, a feeling within his work that not all of society is rational, that virtue is not always rewarded."

== Reception and appraisal ==
The New York Times did not review the book upon its publication. A much later appraisal comes from Barzun and Taylor's encyclopedic Catalogue of Crime:

One of the good stories of murder in godly surroundings, it was the author's first attempt at detection, written while he was a schoolmaster at Salisbury. He now considers the tale cluttered, but the plan showing who was where in the close of Melchester Cathedral on the critical evening makes clear the theories of the official and unofficial detectives: Chief Inspector Hazlerigg and the dean's nephew.
