= Amateur in Violence =

1973 story collection by Michael Gilbert

- First edition cover
- Author: Michael Gilbert
- Genre: Mystery fiction; Short story collection
- Publisher: Davis Publications
- Publication date: 1973

Amateur in Violence is a collection of mystery stories by the prominent British thriller writer Michael Gilbert, published in the United States in 1973 by Davis Publications, a publishing house for magazines, but not in England. Gilbert, who was appointed CBE in 1980, was a founder-member of the British Crime Writers' Association. The Mystery Writers of America named him a Grand Master in 1988 and in 1990 he was presented Bouchercon's Lifetime Achievement Award. The book is edited, and has an introduction, by Ellery Queen, the founder and long-term editor of Ellery Queen's Mystery Magazine. It contains 10 stories and a short novel that had been previously uncollected in the United States. Some of them feature characters who have figured in other novels and short stories by Gilbert. Three stories feature Inspector Hazlerigg and four Inspector Petrella. The short novel, "Stay of Execution", had previously given its name to the title of a collection published in England in 1971. The title story was adapted into the 1960 film The Unstoppable Man.

== Stories in order ==
- Introduction, page 4, by Ellery Queen
- Amateur in Violence, page 7, Inspector Hazlerigg
- Modus Operandi, page 15, Inspector Hazlerigg
- Tea Shop Assassin, page 25, Inspector Hazlerigg
- Bonny for Value, page 29, Inspector Petrella
- The Oyster Catcher, page 44, Inspector Petrella
- Mr. Duckworth's Night Out, page 57, Inspector Petrella
- The King in Pawn, page 72, Inspector Petrella
- Mr. Portway's Practice, page 84,
- Dr. Lethbury's Last Case, page 94,
- Snap Shot, page 100,
- Stay of Execution, page 112 — short novel
