= Doll Skin =

American rock band

- Origin: Phoenix, Arizona, US
- Genres: Punk rock; alternative rock; pop punk
- Years active: 2013–2023
- Labels: Hopeless; EMP; Cargo; Megaforce
- Past members: Alex Snowden; Meghan Herring; Nicole Sander (née Rich); Syd Dolezal
- Website: dollskinband.com

Doll Skin was an American rock band from Phoenix, Arizona, United States. The original band members met at School of Rock Scottsdale. Their sound was a blend of punk, metal, alternative, and pop. Doll Skin has been compared to bands ranging from the Donnas to the Go-Go's to the Runaways. They received press coverage in Alternative Press, Phoenix New Times Billboard, Rock Sound, Kerrang and Bravewords.

== History ==
=== 2013–2014: Formation ===
In 2013, the members began their collaborative work. The initial goal of the project was to compete in a local battle of the bands called Rock Revolution, at Desert Mountain High School in Scottsdale, Arizona. In attendance that night was David Ellefson, bassist of the band Megadeth, and a judge. Doll Skin won first place that year with a nearly perfect score, with their time on stage leaving Ellefson convinced of their potential. He approached them a year later after following their local activity with an offer to manage and produce their music. In November 2014, Doll Skin competed in and were a finalist in the Alice Cooper's "Proof Is In The Pudding" music competition. A cover of Mariah Carey's "All I Want for Christmas Is You" recorded by the band appears on the compilation album Alice Cooper's Taste of Christmas Pudding 2015 the following year.

In December 2014, they were featured in the Phoenix New Times as one of the 10 Best Bands and Musicians in Phoenix Under the Age of 21. In March 2015, they were again featured in the Phoenix New Times as one of the top 15 bands to watch for in 2015. In April 2015, they were the cover story of the North Valley Magazine as "Teen Sensations" rock band.

=== 2015–2018: EMP Label Group ===
In October 2015, Doll Skin released their debut EP, In Your Face, via EMP Label Group and distributed by Megaforce Records (a division of Sony Music Entertainment/RED Distribution) in North America. The record was produced by David Ellefson, EMP Label Group. In Your Face was mixed by the American record producer, sound engineer, former owner of Crush Recording Studios in Scottsdale, Arizona, and founder of Area 52 Entertainment in Los Angeles, California, Ryan Greene. In November 2015, Doll Skin was again referenced by the Phoenix New Times as the No. 1 band under the age of 21 in Phoenix, Arizona, by stating that "It would be wholly impossible to discuss underage bands in Phoenix who are rocking it out without bringing Doll Skin up first.". In December 2015, In Your Face was released in Europe, Asia and Australia by Cargo Records. The EP, and first single, "Family of Strangers", received airplay on many prominent stations in the US, Europe and Asia, including the LA Rock station KROQ, and their debut song "Family of Strangers" landed on the CMJ Loud Rock Chart at No. 34. In January 2016, Doll Skin was included in a list of the "10 Best Female Fronted Bands In Phoenix" by the Phoenix New Times. In November 2016, Doll Skin was awarded the 'Best Break Through Band' by Heavy Metal Television. The award was presented by Ed Masley, the music and entertainment reporter for The Arizona Republic.

In December 2016, Alternative Press magazine featured Doll Skin in the article "7 of the best rising bands under 21" stating: "Don't let the rainbow hair fool you: Doll Skin are one rough and tough act to follow. Expressing themselves as 'glitter-fueled, teenage, punk-rock superheroes,' these Southwest rockers are definitely more than just a pretty face, having toured extensively around the West Coast with bands as diverse as Dead Kennedys and Escape The Fate."

On January 1, 2017, Stone Chrome Radio & TV announced that Doll Skin won the 2016 Listener's Choice Award for "Favorite Female Fronted Band".

On June 16, 2017, Doll Skin released their full-length debut album Manic Pixie Dream Girl. It debuted on the Billboard Heat-seeker chart at No. 6 and moved up one spot to No. 5 in week two.

=== 2019–2023: Hopeless Records debut, Love Is Dead and We Killed Her, and break-up ===
In April, 2019, Taco Bell announced that Doll Skin was added as a member of the Spring 2019 Feed The Beat roster. Since 2006, Taco Bell and its "Feed the Beat" program has helped support more than 1,600 touring artists/bands. Taco Bell provides them with free food while on tour and exposure for those artists by giving them a stage at events around the country, featuring their music in national television commercials, and providing amplification through Taco Bell's social presence. In April 2019, Doll Skin announced that they signed with Hopeless Records, along with the release of their third studio album Love Is Dead And We Killed Her on June 28, 2019. The band also dropped a The Craft-inspired video for the first single "Mark My Words" on April 23 earlier the same year. On September 24, Doll Skin were revealed to one of the bands to appear on Hopeless Records' Songs That Saved My Life Vol. 2, a charity compilation album released by the label to raise funds for mental health and suicide prevention organizations. The band appears on the album with a cover of the Florence + The Machine song "Shake It Out", dedicating the track to long-time supporter and personal friend of the band Robb Veloz, who had died earlier the same year.

In December 2019, Billboard ranked "Mark My Words" at No. 14 on their list of 'The 25 Best Rock & Alternative Songs of 2019'. Additionally, Cryptic Rock Magazine selected Love Is Dead And We Killed Her as one of the Top 5 Punk Rock Albums of 2019. In December 2020, Nicole Rich and Alex Snowden announced their departure from the band. Snowden joined the nu metal band Tallah while Rich moved to Los Angeles and opened a jewelry business called Shop Strawbaby.

On July 15, 2022, Meghan Herring announced her departure from the band.

On January 12, 2023, Doll Skin announced their break-up and Doll Skin Funeral (final show), which was performed at The Rebel Lounge (The Mason Jar) on March 12. The band's original members – Meghan Herring, Nicole Sander (née Rich), and Alex Snowden – reunited for this final performance and played during the majority of Doll Skin's set. Other guests included touring members (see Band Member Doll Skin Alumni section below) that were recruited after Sander, Snowden and Herring's departures. The last song Doll Skin performed was "Family Of Strangers" which vocalist Syd mentioned prior to performing the song it was the first original song Doll Skin wrote together.

On March 6, the band would announce its final song "Melancholia" for release on April 5, 2023. In an Instagram live stream on April 5, Dolezal and Herring announced that demos of unfinished songs would be released for free online, but didn't state when.

== Band members ==
Former members

- Syd Dolezal – lead vocals (2013–2023), rhythm guitar (2014–2020)
- Meghan Herring – drums, backing vocals (2013–2022, 2023)
- Alex Snowden – lead guitar, backing vocals (2013–2020, 2023)
- Nicole Sander (née Rich) – bass, backing vocals (2013–2020, 2023)
- Liz Adams – rhythm guitar (2013–2014)

Touring members (Post 2020 Snowden/Sander Departure – Touring, One-Off Performances and March 2023 Doll Skin Funeral)

- Aria Hurtado – lead guitar (2021, Doll Skin Funeral)
- Cameron Gile – bass, rhythm guitar (2021)
- Chloe Lindeback – lead guitar (2021, Doll Skin Funeral)
- Chris Marchant – saxophone (Doll Skin Funeral)
- Donovan Lloyd – lead guitar (2022)
- Kenzie Halliday – rhythm guitar (2021, Doll Skin Funeral)
- Max Calkins – backing vocals (Doll Skin Funeral)
- Molly Mashal – backing vocals, lead guitar (2021, Doll Skin Funeral)
- Shelby McVicker – rhythm guitar (2021)
- Syd "Scoot" McVicker – lead guitar, drums (2022), drums (Doll Skin Funeral)
- Tay Fischer – bass (2021–2022, Doll Skin Funeral)
- Torri Ross – backing vocals (2021–2022, Doll Skin Funeral), bass (2021), rhythm guitar (2021), lead guitar (2022, Doll Skin Funeral), drums (2021, 2022)
- Wes Spaulding – bass (2022)

Timeline

== Awards ==
Heavy Metal Television Awards

Year	Nominee / work	Award	Result
2016	Doll Skin	Breakout Band Of The Year	Won

Stone Chrome Radio Listener's Choice Awards

Year	Nominee / work	Award	Result
2016	Doll Skin	Favorite Female Fronted Band Of The Year	Won
2017	Doll Skin	Female Artist Of The Year	Won
2017	Doll Skin / "Daughter"	Song Of The Year	Won

Billboard Magazine

Year	Nominee / work	Award	Result
2019	Doll Skin / "Mark My Words"	Best Rock & Alternative Songs of the Year (#14)	Won

Cryptic Rock

Year	Nominee / work	Award	Result
2019	Doll Skin / "Love is Dead and We Killed Her"	Best Punk Albums of 2019	Won

== Discography ==
=== Demos ===
- Live at The Trunk Space (Self-Released, 2014)
- Live at Wolfstock (Self-Released, 2014)
- Guts & Glitter (Self-Released, 2014)

=== Studio releases ===
- In Your Face EP (EMP, 2015)
- In Your Face (Again) (EMP, 2016)
- Manic Pixie Dream Girl (EMP, 2017)
- Love Is Dead and We Killed Her (Hopeless, 2019)

=== Other appearances ===
- Vans Warped Tour '18 2XCD (SideOneDummy, 2018) – "Baby's Breath" [various artist compilation]
- Ellefson-Sleeping Giants (Combat/EMP, 2019) – "Daughter" [David Ellefson sampler]
- Songs That Saved My Life, Vol. 2 (Hopeless/Sub City, 2019) – "Shake It Out" [Florence And The Machine cover, various artist compilation]
- "Parents" by NOAHFINNCE featuring Doll Skin [YUNGBLUD cover, non-album single]

=== In Your Face (2015) ===
All tracks are written by Meghan Herring, Syd Dolezal, Nicole Rich, Alex Snowden; except "Weatherman" (Dead Sara).

No.	Title	Length
1.	"Family of Strangers"	2:26
2.	"Wring Me Out"	3:25
3.	"Let's Be Honest"	2:56
4.	"Blind"	5:47
5.	"So Much Nothing"	3:08
6.	"Weatherman (live)"	4:27
Total length:		22:09

=== In Your Face (Again) (2016) ===
All tracks are written by Meghan Herring, Syd Dolezal, Nicole Rich, Alex Snowden; except "Woman" (Heskett/James/Ross/Stockdale). "Weatherman" (live) and "Woman" are omitted from the vinyl release.

No.	Title	Length
1.	"Family of Strangers"	2:26
2.	"Wring Me Out"	3:25
3.	"Let's Be Honest"	2:56
4.	"Blind"	5:47
5.	"So Much Nothing"	3:08
6.	"Weatherman (live)"	4:27
7.	"Furious Fixation"	5:07
8.	"Woman"	2:21
9.	"Family of Strangers (Punk'd Mix)"	2:17
Total length:		31:54

=== Manic Pixie Dream Girl (2017) ===
All tracks are written by Meghan Herring, Syd Dolezal, Nicole Rich, Alex Snowden; except "Uninvited" (Alanis Morissette).

No.	Title	Length
1.	"Shut Up (You Miss Me)"	2:45
2.	"Daughter"	2:56
3.	"Road Killa"	2:58
4.	"Boy Band"	3:23
5.	"Rubi"	3:52
6.	"Sunflower"	2:46
7.	"Sweet Pea"	4:18
8.	"Baby's Breath"	3:42
9.	"Persephone"	3:29
10.	"Puncha Nazi"	1:53
11.	"Uninvited"	4:14
Total length:		36:27

== Charted songs/albums ==
Song title	Year	Chart Name	Peak chart positions	Album Title
"Daughter"	2017	US Billboard Mainstream Rock Indicator	32	Manic Pixie Dream Girl
n/a	2019	US Billboard Heatseekers Albums	10	Love Is Dead And We Killed Her
n/a	2019	US Billboard Independent Albums	35	Love Is Dead And We Killed Her
n/a	2019	US Billboard Rock Album Sales	39	Love Is Dead And We Killed Her
n/a	2019	US Billboard Alternative Album Sales	19	Love Is Dead And We Killed Her
n/a	2020	BandsInTown + Billboard U.S. Rising Artists Index	30	n/a
n/a	2020	BandsInTown + Billboard U.S. Global Artists Index	32	n/a

== Tours ==
- Jan 2016: Metal Allegiance West Coast Tour (direct support)
- Jan–Feb 2016: Ship Rocked Cruise 2016
- Mar–Apr 2016: Doll Skin Family of Strangers Tour
- Apr–May 2016: Generation Doom 2016 North American Tour (with OTEP, Lacey Sturm, September Mourning, & Through Fire)
- Jun 2016: We're All In This Together Tour (with Hellyeah, Escape the Fate, & Sunflower Dead)
- Jul–Aug 2016: Equal Rights, Equal Lefts Tour (with OTEP, Fire from the Gods)
- May 2017: Shut Up Tour
- June 2017: Vans Warped Tour – Vans Warped Tour 2017
- June–Aug 2017: Shut Up Tour (Part 2)
- Sept–Oct 2017: Something Wicked Tour (with One-Eyed Doll)
- Jan–Feb 2018: Rock The Boat Tour
- Jan 2018: Ship Rocked Cruise 2018
- Mar 2018: Europe/UK Manic Pixie Dream Tour
- Jun–Aug 2018: Vans Warped Tour – Vans Warped Tour 2018
- Aug 2018: United Kingdom/Europe Tour
- May–Jul 2019: From The Screen To Your Stereo Tour (with New Found Glory, Real Friends, and The Early November)
- Jul 2019: Vans Warped Tour – Vans Warped Tour 25 Years (Mountain View)
- Aug–Sep 2019: United Kingdom/Europe Tour (with Trash Boat, Capstan, and The Woes)
- Nov–Dec 2019: US Tour (with With Confidence, Seaway (band), Between You And Me)
- Mar 2020: US Tour with Anti-Flag and Grade 2 (band)

== Endorsements ==
Doll Skin has been endorsed by Music Man, Sinister Guitar Picks, Schecter Guitar Research, ISP Technologies, Beier Drums, D'Addario, Blackstar Amplification, Hartke Systems, Korg, Lag Guitars, SJC Drums, Samson, and Sonal Percussions.

== See also ==
- List of Warped Tour lineups by year
