= Game Without Rules =

1967 story collection by Michael Gilbert

- First US edition 1967
- Author: Michael Gilbert
- Language: English
- Genre: Short stories
- Publisher: Harper & Row (US); Hodder & Stoughton (UK)
- Publication date: 1967 (US); 1968 (UK)
- Publication place: United Kingdom
- Media type: Print
- Pages: 243
- Followed by: Mr. Calder and Mr. Behrens

First UK edition 1968

Game Without Rules is a short story collection by the British crime and spy writer Michael Gilbert featuring his counter-intelligence agents Calder and Behrens. The first US edition was published in 1967 by Harper & Row, and the UK edition in 1968 by Hodder & Stoughton. A second collection of stories followed in 1982 under the title Mr. Calder and Mr. Behrens.

== Stories ==
The book contains the following stories, most of which were originally published in Ellery Queen's Mystery Magazine between 1962 and 1967:

- "The Road to Damascus"
- "On Slay Down"
- "The Spoilers"
- "The Cat Cracker"
- "Trembling's Tours"
- "The Headmaster"
- "Heilige Nacht"
- "Upon the King..."
- "Cross-Over"
- "Prometheus Unbound"
- "A Prince of Abyssinia"

== Principal characters ==
The collection features two of Gilbert's most popular characters, the amiable elderly spies Daniel John Calder and Samuel Behrens. The third member of the team is Mr Calder's Persian deerhound, Rasselas, a ferocious creature of at times "distinctly superhuman intelligence".

== Literary criticism ==
The mystery critic Anthony Boucher called Game without Rules the second-best volume of spy short stories ever published, next only to Somerset Maugham's Ashenden.

Kirkus Reviews considered the book to be a coup, a "stellar collection of short stories in a very difficult form — episodes and espionage". The reviewer thought the stories to be highly diverting and sometimes touching.

The New York Times Book Review called the stories "entertaining and exciting", and found it hard to say which element was the most effective: the smooth ingenuity of plotting, the disconcerting combination of elegance and harshness, or the shock of amoral realism. The New Yorker opined that Gilbert "has given us an evening of pure joy in this collection of tales". And Life Magazine praised the author's almost perfect timing and surprise, elegance of language, and general sense of economy.

In their encyclopedic Catalogue of Crime, Barzun and Taylor noted that while the story-telling is first-rate, "the genre seems to us more liable to repetition of effects than crime and detection".

In a 1984 essay, George N Dove considered that one of the reasons for the lasting popularity of Calder and Behrens was the happy contrast between their outward appearance of elderly, quiet gentility and the pair's ability to take forceful action.

== Adaptations ==
A series of twenty radio plays by Gilbert under the general title Game without Rules was broadcast by BBC Radio 2 between October 1968 and January 1969, including the following derived from stories collected in this anthology:

- "The Spoilers"
- "The Road to Damascus"
- "Cat Cracker"
- "Cross-Over"
- "Heilige Nacht"
