= The Man Who Could Not Sleep and Other Mysteries =

2011 radio plays by Michael Gilbert

First edition

The Man Who Could Not Sleep and Other Mysteries is a collection of radio plays by the British thriller writer Michael Gilbert, first published in 2011 by the British company Robert Hale and unpublished in the United States. It contains two long, previously uncollected radio plays, as well as synopses of two proposed stage plays that were never subsequently written. It also has an introduction by John Cooper and three appendices. The locales of the plays are mostly in London and its environs. Two of the many recurring characters that Gilbert created over his exceedingly long writing career, Nap Rumbold and Hargest Macrea, are in "The Game Called Justice". As usual with Gilbert, the tone of the stories is civilized and even occasionally light-hearted, but there are always elements of bleakness beneath the urbane surface, particularly in "The Last Chapter". "Michael was an exceptionally fine storyteller, but he's hard to classify," said one of his American publishers after his death. "He's not a hard-boiled writer in the classic sense, but there is a hard edge to him, a feeling within his work that not all of society is rational, that virtue is not always rewarded.". Gilbert, who was appointed CBE in 1980, was a founder-member of the British Crime Writers' Association. The Mystery Writers of America named him a Grand Master in 1988 and in 1990 he was presented Bouchercon's Lifetime Achievement Award.

== Contents in order ==
- Introduction, page 7, by John Cooper
- The Man Who Could Not Sleep—A Serial thriller in six parts, page 14 — radio play featuring Henry Bohun
  - The Hampstead Flat, page 15
  - The Early Hours of the Morning, page 33
  - Miss Tappett and Her Tortoises, page 51
  - Trouble at the Law Society, page 70
  - Closing the Gap, page 90
  - The Traveller's Rest, page 111
- My Aunt She Died a Month Ago, page 135 — proposed play synopsis
- The Game Called Justice, page 142 — proposed play synopsis featuring Noel Anthony Pontarlier ("Nap") Rumbold and Hargest Macrae
- The Last Chapter, page 155 — radio play
- Appendix A — The Casebook of Henry Montacute Bohun, page 215
- Appendix B — Radio plays by Michael Gilbert, page 217
- Appendix C — Television plays and serial by Michael Gilbert, page 220
