= Petrella at Q =

1977 story collection by Michael Gilbert

First edition (UK)

Petrella at Q is a collection of 11 short stories plus one longer story divided into four parts about the British policeman Patrick Petrella by the British writer Michael Gilbert published in the United Kingdom by Hodder and Stoughton in 1977 and in the United States by Harper & Row the same year. Gilbert, who was appointed CBE in 1980, was a founder-member of the British Crime Writers' Association. The Mystery Writers of America named him a Grand Master in 1988 and in 1990 he was presented Bouchercon's Lifetime Achievement Award. Many of the stories had previously appeared in such magazines as Reveille in the United Kingdom and Ellery Queen's Mystery Magazine in the United States. In addition to the stories themselves, there is an introductory sketch of Petrella by Gilbert written especially for this book. A second collection of stories, Young Petrella, was published ten years later, in 1987, but consisted exclusively of stories about Petrella's very first years on the force, when he began as a detective constable.

== Stories in order ==
- Patrick Petrella, page 9 — biographical sketch of Petrella by Gilbert
- SUMMER: The Elusive Baby, page 16 — he begins the book as Detective Inspector Petrella
- SUMMER: The Banting Street Fire, page 28
- SUMMER: The Death of Mrs. Key, page 39
- SUMMER: Why Tarry the Wheels of His Chariot, page 49
- AUTUMN: Rough Justice page 59 — Detective Inspector Petrella has just been promoted to Deputy Chief Inspector Petrella
- AUTUMN: Counterplot, page 69
- AUTUMN: "To the Editor, Dear Sir–", page 77
- AUTUMN: A Thoroughly Nice Boy, page 92
- WINTER: The Cleaners, page 104
  - PART I: Inquest on the Death of Bernie Nicholls, page 104
  - PART II: A Lively Night at Basildon Mansions, page 119
  - PART III: The Peripatetic Birds, page 134
  - PART IV: St. Valentine's Day, page 150
- SPRING: Captain Crabtree, page 164
- SPRING: The Last Tenant, page 186
- SPRING: Mutiny at Patton Street, page 205
