= The Murder of Diana Devon and Other Mysteries =

2009 story collection by Michael Gilbert

First edition

The Murder of Diana Devon and Other Mysteries is a collection of mystery stories and radio plays by the British thriller writer Michael Gilbert, first published in 2009 by the British company Robert Hale. Gilbert, who was appointed CBE in 1980, was a founder-member of the British Crime Writers' Association. The Mystery Writers of America named him a Grand Master in 1988 and in 1990 he was presented Bouchercon's Lifetime Achievement Award. It contains 13 previously uncollected stories, as well as a poem and two unpublished radio plays featuring his characters Mr. Calder and Mr. Behrens. It has an introduction by John Cooper and an appendix listing all of the Calder and Behrens radio plays. At least two of the stories feature Superintendent Mahood, one of Gilbert's earlier recurring characters and who only appears in short stories.

== Stories in order ==
- Introduction, page 7, by John Cooper
- The Murder of Diana Devon, page 13, Superintendent Mahood
- The Rules of the Game, page 42
- Good Old Monty, page 58
- No Place Like Home, page 72
- St Ethelburga and the Angel of Death, page 77, radio play featuring Mr. Calder and Mr. Behrens
- The Great German Spy Hunt, page 106
- The Killing of Karl Carver, page 112
- Close Contact, page 123
- The Fire-Raisers, page 127
- Y Mynyddoed Sanctiaidd, page 145
- The Klagenfurt Tote, page 153
- Churchill's Men, page 159, radio play featuring Mr. Calder and Mr. Behrens
- Coronation Year, page 186
- The Seventh Paragraph, page 197
- Superintendent Mahood and the Craven Case, page 201, Superintendent Mahood
- Arnold or the Uses of Electricity, page 219, poem
- Appendix, page 223 — Game Without Rules, a series in twenty parts
