= Stay of Execution (short story collection) =

1971 story collection by Michael Gilbert

First edition

Stay of Execution is a collection of mystery stories by the British thriller writer Michael Gilbert, first published in 1971 by Hodder & Stoughton. Gilbert, who was appointed CBE in 1980, was a founder-member of the British Crime Writers' Association. The Mystery Writers of America named him a Grand Master in 1988 and in 1990 he was presented Bouchercon's Lifetime Achievement Award. Unusually for a collection of stories, its reprint edition by House of Stratus in 2011 has no index detailing the stories in the book. The longest story, by far, is the last one in the book, Stay of Execution. At 54 pages, it is what is generally called a novella. Two of the stories feature Chief Superintendent Hazlerigg; three Henry Bohun; and one Detective Inspector Petrella, characters who have figured in other short stories and novels by Gilbert. The Independent said of the book in 2006:

Gilbert had a fondness for amusing but unscrupulous pirates... and an entirely practical, indeed sceptical, view of the workings of the law. It was typical of his humour that the two stories in his excellent collection Stay of Execution (1971) in which rascally solicitors "get away with it", "Back on the Shelf" and "Mr Portway's Practice", were written in the first person.

== Stories in order ==
- Preface, page vii
- Back on the Shelf, page 1
- The Blackmailing of Mr. Justice Ball, page 6
- Murder by Jury, page 18 Chief Inspector Hazlerigg
- Xinia Florata, page 29 Henry Bohun. Published in US newspapers as The Secret of the Missing Will
- Weekend at Wapentake, page 35 Henry Bohun
- The System, page 47 Henry Bohun
- Cousin Once Removed, page 61
- Modus Operandi, page 66 Chief Inspector Hazlerigg
- The King in Pawn, page 78 Detective Inspector Petrella
- The Rich Man in His Castle, page 92
- Where There's a Will, page 103
- Mr. Portway's Practice, page 116
- Stay of Execution, page 128
