= The Mathematics of Murder: A Fearne & Bracknell Collection =

2000 story collection by Michael Gilbert

First edition

The Mathematics of Murder: A Fearne & Bracknell Collection, is a collection of mystery short stories by the prominent British thriller writer Michael Gilbert, first published in the United Kingdom by Robert Hale in 2000 when Gilbert was 88 years old but still an active writer. Gilbert, who was appointed CBE in 1980, was a founder-member of the British Crime Writers' Association. The Mystery Writers of America named him a Grand Master in 1988 and in 1990 he was presented Bouchercon's Lifetime Achievement Award.

The 14 stories in the book all revolve around one or more members of a small law firm of solicitors located in London in an area near the Tower called Little Bethel, "on the borderline between the City and the East End". The two senior partners are Francis Fearne and Robert Bracknell; the junior partners are their children, Tara Fearne and Hugo Bracknell. The senior partners are seldom seen outside their offices except for occasional visits to police stations or law courts. The younger partners, however, in addition to their more pedestrian legal activities are frequently engaged in investigations or inquiries outside London that sometimes put them into actual physical danger. The most important member of the firm in many ways, though, appears to be their managing clerk, an "old" bachelor named Horace Piggin. Affectionately called "Piggy", he is a font of bottomless experience, sage advice, and acquaintanceship with, apparently, nearly everyone in London, including policemen, criminals, and potential clients. It is Piggy who frequently either suggests to the partners or who actively finds a resolution to the legal problem they are grappling with. The firm's relations with the Metropolitan Police are distinctly mixed: they help each other out from time to time on certain cases, but Chief Inspector Mayburg, a recurring character, regards all solicitors as obstructive nuisances "and was particularly suspicious of Fearne & Bracknell who, it seemed to him, interfered in matters which ought to be left to the police."

A long-time solicitor in London (he once drafted Raymond Chandler's will), Gilbert's stories in this collection all concern some legal problem, frequently involving wills, as well as crimes of one kind or another. Murders or disappearances figure in some of them, including the lead story, The Mathematics of Murder, which features a serial killer who dispatches his victims on commuter trains going to and from London. They are written in a spare, straightforward style that occasionally approaches the light-hearted. Some of them, though, such as The Mathematics of Murder and Halfway House become increasing grim as the story progresses. And at least one of them, The Good Shepherd, besides having a distinctly dark side to it, also comes to a conclusion that is far from being a happy one.

When he heard the news, Bob Bracknell said to Francis Fearne, "Not really one of our successes."

"Not really," Fearne agreed.

A number of the stories contain what might seem to be rather unlikely coincidences that ultimately lead to their satisfactory but perhaps improbable conclusions. At least one of them, A Message from the Stars, revolves around what appears to be a preposterous premise: a successful lady horse-racing handicapper is sometimes visited during the night in her third-story apartment in London by a circus acrobat who scales the walls, enters her bedroom through an open window, and whispers hot tips on up-coming races to the half-awake woman—tips that then come true.

== Stories ==
- The Mathematics of Murder
- Tiger Country
- The Lord of the Book
- Rat's Castle
- The Message of the Stars
- The Good Shepherd
- On a Dead Man's Chest
- Halfway House
- Police Business
- High Finance
- Enter the Vulture
- Ranulph Hall
- A Problem in Ethics
- Locard's Principle
