= Death Has Deep Roots =

1951 mystery novel by Michael Gilbert

First edition

Death Has Deep Roots is the fifth novel by the British mystery writer Michael Gilbert. It was published in England by Hodder and Stoughton in 1951 and in the United States by Harper & Brothers in 1952. It is a classical courtroom trial story juxtaposed with thriller elements. Although Inspector Hazlerigg, who had appeared in all of Gilbert's earlier novels as a mostly leading character, does play a role in this story, it is only in two brief appearances, once towards the beginning of the book and once again near the end. Two of the three main characters in this book are from previous novels, Major Angus McMann (They Never Looked Inside) and Noel Anthony Pontarlier ("Nap") Rumbold (The Doors Open). The other leading character, the trial barrister Hargest Macrae, also appears in some of Gilbert's early short stories.

The novel is the basis of the 1956 Gibraltar Films production Guilty?, directed by Edmond T. Gréville and starring John Justin as Nap Rumbold.

== Plot ==
The setting is London in about 1950. Victoria Lamartine, a young French woman working at a small family hotel in Soho, has been arrested for the murder of an English major whom she had previously known in France during the war. Lamartine had been active in the Resistance and, the prosecution now asserts, had had a child fathered by the major, who was liaising with the French maquisards. In spite of being arrested by the Gestapo, she nevertheless bears the child and survives the war. The child dies not long afterwards and Lamartine comes to London to work in the hotel. Since the end of the war, she has been trying to locate the major but in vain. Finally, just before the story opens, she succeeds in contacting him and he agrees to meet her at the hotel. That evening he is found dead in his hotel room, stabbed through the heart with a deadly technique that the Resistance had developed. Lamartine is quickly arrested and charged with his murder.

Nap Rumbold, a junior solicitor in his father's London firm, is asked by Lamartine to represent her. Nap, who speaks excellent French, had himself spent four months on dangerous missions with the French maquis in occupied France and is now a retired Lieutenant-Colonel, D.S.O. He is a friend of Major McCann, who had led tanks through France after the D-Day invasion, and asks McCann for help. McMann in turn interviews his friend Inspector Hazlerigg at Scotland Yard. Hazlerigg is not directly involved in the case, but subtly points McMann into a possible direction to take. The rest of the book is divided about equally between courtroom scenes involving Hargest Macrae and various witnesses, and the adventures (and misadventures) of Rumbold and McCann as they try to track down witnesses in both England and France who might help bring in a verdict of not guilty. Rumbold, in particular, in trying to uncover new information in France, is put in particular danger by a murderous gang and at one point saves his life only by a desperate plunge into the Loire River. The final scenes are in the courtroom and with a summing up in Hazlerigg's office.

== Reception and Appraisals ==
Anthony Boucher of The New York Times said that "the first 1952 book to reach this reviewer's desk is one which wouldn't disgrace any Best-of-the-Year list" and went on to say that it concerned:

...an important murder trial, with real understanding of courtroom psychology and technique. But the camera eye of the author constantly flashes from this... to the efforts of two likable and believable amateurs detectives who are striving to assemble last-minute evidence for the defense; and their adventures, involving maquisards and collaborators from the past, and gold-smugglers and secret agents of the present, make a thriller as wildly exciting as the courtroom scenes are suavely persuasive. It's hard to recall any technical tour de force of fusion quite so admirably integrated as this. Mr. Gilbert is one of the most accomplished leaders of the new British school of murder writing.

A much later appraisal comes from Barzun and Taylor's encyclopedic Catalogue of Crime:

There have been many mystery tales based upon the activities of the French Resistance; few have been good, and fewer stand up to current rereading. This is one of the very best... Scene of the crime is a small London hotel. Counsel of both sides are excellently portrayed. A gripping tale: one of the author's triumphs.
