= Blood and Judgement =

1959 detective novel by Michael Gilbert

First edition

Blood and Judgement is a police procedural novel by the British author Michael Gilbert. Published in England in 1959 as Blood and Judgement by Hodder and Stoughton and in the United States as Blood and Judgment by Harper & Brothers, it was Gilbert's tenth novel. It was originally serialized in Argosy magazine in 1958 as Blood On The Scales. Gilbert, who was appointed CBE in 1980, was a founder-member of the British Crime Writers' Association. The Mystery Writers of America named him a Grand Master in 1988 and in 1990 he was presented Bouchercon's Lifetime Achievement Award. It introduces his most notable series character, Patrick Petrella, as a young and already somewhat controversial Detective Sergeant working out of the fictional Q Division of the Metropolitan Police Area.

== Plot ==
The body of a woman is discovered hidden away in the bushes near a little-known part of London, the fictitious Binford Park Reservoir, which, in spite of its size, importance, and somewhat rural aspects, is relatively inconspicuous and unknown even to its closest neighbors. Although a number of policemen are featured in the book, both those at Q Division and additional members from New Scotland Yard, Petrella is the protagonist through whom we see most of the story. The story is told in what is apparently a realistic and knowledgeable depiction of how a great metropolitan police force would actually investigate this sort of crime. So-called "police procedurals" were becoming popular in the 1950s, with notable examples being the 87th Precinct novels of the American writer Ed McBain and the British novels about Commander Gideon of Scotland Yard by J.J. Marrick. Gilbert himself was a longtime practicing solicitor in London, and in this story, as in many of his others, he imbues it with a fair amount of court scenes and overall legal expertise.

In spite of being mostly focused on the police and how they methodically track down, arrest, and have prosecuted various professional criminals, there are still surprising twists and turns in the story's plotting, in which apparently straightforward assumptions and/or characters are suddenly revealed to be something completely different. It is, in fact, not until the very last pages that we are sure that the actual perpetrator has been arrested—but not yet brought to trial. And, in a final ironic twist, the odious gangster who has previously been arrested and convicted on a capital murder charge is set free on appeal and now looks to profit greatly from his legal tribulations by selling his story to the newspapers for a large amount of money. As one of Gilbert's editors said after his death in 2006, "He's not a hard-boiled writer in the classic sense, but there is a hard edge to him, a feeling within his work that not all of society is rational, that virtue is not always rewarded.". Such is the case here.

== Reception and/or Appraisal ==
Anthony Boucher, the noted mystery critic of The New York Times, gave it a very favorable review, saying that:

Michael Gilbert has the agreeable habit of never writing the same book twice.... [This] case seems to be a simple gang killing, but evolves into something of greater psychological interest; and the detective is unorthodox but effective young Detective Sergeant Pat Petrella—a man who should have a great career if he can manage not to get kicked off the force. Despite Gilbert's insistence on variety, I shouldn't mind at all if he'd write this book again, and give us more of Petrella.

A much later appraisal comes from Barzun and Taylor's encyclopedic Catalogue of Crime:

M.G.'s first effort at "police routine" and very well done. His hero is Sergeant Petrella... Here he unravels the murder of a woman, wife of a convict, on the bank of an isolated London reservoir, while also tracing a vanished employee of the Metropolitan Water Board. The politics within the CID interrupt his search, and he and a friend do some night skin diving on their own, with the happiest results. The title is a phrase from Hamlet III, 2,74.

== See also ==
- Patrick Petrella
- 87th Precinct
- Commander Gideon
- Metropolitan Police
- Crime Writers' Association
- Mystery Writers of America
