= The Curious Conspiracy =

2002 story collection by Michael Gilbert

First edition (US)

The Curious Conspiracy is a collection of mystery stories by the British thriller writer Michael Gilbert, first published in 2002 by the American company Crippen & Landru and then in England. Published to recognize Gilbert's 90th birthday, it contains 20 previously uncollected stories, as well as a brief introduction by Gilbert himself and an appendix for Sources. Gilbert, who was appointed CBE in 1980, was a founder-member of the British Crime Writers' Association. The Mystery Writers of America named him a Grand Master in 1988 and in 1990 he was presented Bouchercon's Lifetime Achievement Award. Four of the stories in this collection feature two of Gilbert's many recurring characters that he created throughout his long career of writing both novels and short stories. Gilbert's introduction says that the topics covered by the stories are "catholic", in the sense of being "of universal human interest; touching the needs, interests or sympathies of all men." The locales vary from London to a Red Sea sheikdom and the time frame from the present day back to the Peninsular War. Some of them, such as "Judith", have an unexpected grimness about them. "Michael was an exceptionally fine storyteller, but he's hard to classify," said one of his British publishers after his death. "He's not a hard-boiled writer in the classic sense, but there is a hard edge to him, a feeling within his work that not all of society is rational, that virtue is not always rewarded.".

== Stories in order ==
- Introduction, page 7, by Michael Gilbert
- Audited and Found Correct, page 9
- Friends of the Groom, page 21, Chief Inspector Hazlerigg
- The Blackmailer, page 27
- Squeeze Play, page 35
- Under the Last Scuttleful, page 40
- Scream in A Soundproofed Room, page 45
- The Sheik Goes Shopping, page 52
- Clos Carmine, page 63
- The Curious Conspiracy, page 69
- Blood Match, page 81
- The Seventh Musket, page 90 — set during the Peninsular War
- The Inside Pocket, page 106
- Freedom of the Press, page 122, Detective Sergeant Petrella
- Miss Bell's Stocking, page 133, Detective Sergeant Petrella
- Five on the Gun, page 144
- The Jackal and the Tiger, page 149
- Judith, page 172
- Verdict of Three, page 185
- Decoy, page 198, Detective Inspector Petrella
- Dead Reckoning, page 224
- Sources, page 234
