= Flash Point (Gilbert novel) =

1974 thriller novel by Michael Gilbert

First edition (UK)

Flash Point is a 1974 novel by the British author Michael Gilbert published in England by Hodder and Stoughton and in the United States by Harper & Row. It was Gilbert's 17th novel and undoubtedly written during the last days of the American Watergate scandal. Although none of the events in the book directly parallel those of Watergate, it begins with a banal legal matter and then escalates into a government cover-up and national scandal. The American edition has an apparent subtitle shown only on its copyright page: "A Harper Novel of Law and Lawlessness". Like a number of other works by Gilbert and his near contemporaries Victor Canning and Ross Thomas, it is less a standard novel of suspense than a political thriller about the amorality and subsequent lethal reactions of those in the highest government positions when confronted by seemingly trivial events that blossom uncontrollably into perceived challenges to their positions.

== Plot ==
Written with Gilbert's usual urbane and understated style, the events mostly take place in and around London, as is customary in most of his books: in sundry law offices, courts, government offices, and gentlemen's clubs. Gilbert himself was a most Establishment figure, frequently writing about other Establishment figures, and was usually firmly on the side of England's police forces and shadowy (though lethal) Intelligent departments. But perhaps because of his many years of legal practice, he was also equally at home in filling his narratives with other types of characters: sleazy strip-club owners, tough and semi-crooked policemen, hard-bitten union officials, factory workers, relentless and unscrupulous Intelligent agents, and a wide variety of hard-boiled villains and crooks from small-time burglars and con men to gangster chieftains.

Flash Point begins with Jonas Killey, an obscure but obstinate and somewhat truculent solicitor with a small practice in Wimbledon, attempting to bring charges against Will Dylan, a rising young politician, for what he purports to be the embezzlement of funds during Dylan's handling of the merger of two small labor unions several years before. The facts are obscure, the documentation equally obscure, the matter of no interest to anyone except Killey; the various Law Societies and associated bodies to whom he appeals for help in pursuing his claims are reluctant to take up the matter. The story unfolds through the points of view of various legal and political personalities, and little by little Killey succeeds in bringing the matter to wider public attention—at the cost of drawing into the picture a number of unscrupulous characters, communist trades union men apparently acting on his behalf, and an even more unscrupulous intelligence department's chief acting to discredit Killey and suppress the entire matter. Much of the ensuing book takes place in lawyer's chambers, magistrates' courts, newspaper offices, and the occasional meeting between high government officials, including the Prime Minister himself. By the time the book ends, the cover-up has become a newspaper sensation comparable to the Watergate scandal of that time in the United States and in the ensuing election the Prime Minister and his party are turned out of office. Unlike most other Gilbert books, however, all of the violence is of the non-lethal kind: people are threatened, roughed up, and actually beaten, but the only two fatalities in the story are inadvertent. There is, nevertheless, a sharp edge to the entire story that is entirely in keeping with what one of Gilbert's American editors said about him after his death in 2006, many years after the publication of Flash Point:

"He's not a hard-boiled writer in the classic sense, but there is a hard edge to him, a feeling within his work that not all of society is rational, that virtue is not always rewarded.". Such is the case in Flash Point, although Jonas Killey himself, the uncompromising instigator of so much national drama, ends up in surprisingly benign circumstances in totally different, non-legalist surroundings.

== Reception ==
Newgate Callendar, the mystery critic of the New York Times, gave it a very favorable review, saying that:

Michael Gilbert's FLASH POINT (Harper & Row, $6.95) examines certain aspects of the British Parliamentary system and does not like what it sees. Gilbert, himself a lawyer, works up a situation where, in an effort to stop a legal case, the British Government steps in and subverts the basic rights of citizens. Gilbert poses big questions that carry the ethical problems straight up to the Prime Minister. The analogy to certain doings in the United States Government of recent vintage is not once mentioned, but obviously Gilbert had it on his mind. The ending of “Flash Point,” however, is a bit weak. It is as though Gilbert did not know exactly how to resolve the plot, and there is the sudden, unconvincing reversal of character of several key figures. Nevertheless a strong, well‐written book.
