= Death in Captivity =

1952 WWII mystery novel by Michael Gilbert

First edition (UK)

Death in Captivity is a mystery novel by the British crime writer Michael Gilbert, first published in the United Kingdom in 1952 by Hodder and Stoughton and in the United States by Harper & Brothers as The Danger Within. It was Gilbert's sixth novel and, unlike his previous ones, does not feature Chief Inspector Hazlerigg in any way. Nor is it set in Gilbert's usual locales of London, the English countryside, or France. Instead, while it has many of the elements of the classic detective story, it is also a gripping novel of mounting suspense that takes place in a 1943 prisoner of war camp for British officers in northern Italy—it was the first of Gilbert's numerous later works that would feature suspense and danger as much or more as elements of detection. Gilbert himself had been a British officer during the war, was captured, and interned in an Italian camp. He escaped and spent several months making his way through the Italian countryside trying to reach the British lines. Much of this book apparently reflects his own experiences. It was the basis of a 1959 British film, Danger Within (Breakout in the United States), that closely followed the events in the book. H.R.F. Keating, who wrote Gilbert's obituary for The Guardian, said that "Gilbert's time as a PoW prompted Death In Captivity (1952), surely the only whodunnit set in a prisoner-of-war camp."

== Plot ==
A murder has been committed, but not in the usual confines of the secluded English country house so typical of the Golden age of detective fiction. Instead, a Greek prisoner of war interned in a camp for British officers is found dead in a secret tunnel that a number of the officers have been tirelessly working on in the hope of fleeing the camp. No one knows how the Greek could have gotten there or who could have killed him. Hoping to protect their tunnelling activities, a committee of senior officers designates a scholarly fellow officer to investigate the death and attempt to determine who had killed the Greek and somehow get him into their tunnel. Most of the rest of the book concerns his attempts to carry out a discreet investigation within the heavily guarded camp. Just as he is about to finally reveal who has committed the crime, word comes that the Italians, who have now officially left the war, are about to turn the camp over to German forces. The tunnel can just barely be completed in the next few hours—will they then be able to evacuate the entire camp before the Germans arrive? The final chapters of the book relate the adventures of three escaped officers as they attempt to traverse the Italian countryside and reach the safety of the Allied lines. Gilbert himself, in real life, escaped with two fellow officers, and the book is dedicated to the actual names of those officers.

The US version of the novel, The Danger Within, ends with the breakout from the camp, and omits (except as a half-page postscript) the journey through Italy. The film Danger Within also ends with the breakout.

== Appraisal ==
An appraisal some years after its publication comes from Barzun and Taylor's encyclopedic Catalogue of Crime:

A superb, though harrowing, story of murder in a prisoner-of-war camp in northern Italy towards the end of the last world war. The skill with which suspense is kept up during a series of trivial incidents related to oppression and plans of escape is equaled only by the management of a large number of characters, Italian and English.

== Film version ==
In 1959, a film adaptation was released starring Richard Todd and Richard Attenborough.
