= Smallbone Deceased =

1950 mystery novel by Michael Gilbert

- First UK edition
- Author: Michael Gilbert
- Language: English
- Genre: Crime
- Published: 1950 (Hodder and Stoughton, UK); 1950 (Harper & Row, US)
- Publication place: United Kingdom
- Media type: Print
- Pages: 253
- ISBN: 978-0-340-32037-2

Smallbone Deceased is a 1950 mystery novel by the English author Michael Gilbert, published in the United Kingdom by Hodder and Stoughton and in the United States by Harper & Brothers. A practising lawyer himself, Gilbert made the setting of the novel a London solicitor's office. The book was Gilbert's fourth novel and, like his three earlier ones, features Chief Inspector Hazlerigg. The novel was well-received and has regularly appeared in "Top 100" crime lists. Some critics consider it to be Gilbert's best work.

== Plot ==
Horniman, Birley and Craine are a respectable firm of solicitors, of Lincoln's Inn, London. After the firm’s senior partner Abel Horniman dies, a large deed box in his office is opened to reveal a corpse. The body is that of Marcus Smallbone, who had been a co-trustee with Mr Horniman of the valuable Ichabod Stokes Trust.

Chief Inspector Hazlerigg investigates with the help of Henry Bohun, a newly-qualified solicitor and employee of the firm. Bohun has a condition (called in the novel 'parainsomnia') that means he needs less than two hours sleep a night, giving him a great deal of time to help with the investigations. Suspicion falls initially on the recently deceased partner, the theory being that Smallbone had been killed to prevent him from publicly denouncing Horniman’s misuse of the Trust funds. Miss Cornel, who had been Horniman’s devoted secretary for over 20 years, helps his solicitor son Bob Horniman take over the Ichabod Stokes Trust work. But when Miss Chittering, one of the secretaries, is strangled, suspicion switches to Bob himself, who is clearly lying about where he was on the day in question.

Bohun realises that Bob Horniman is in love with another of the secretaries, Anne Mildmay. The pair had had a romantic liaison in the office on the day Miss Chittering was killed, and he lied about it to protect her. The true killer was Miss Cornel who, in an act of misguided loyalty to her ex-employer, had dispatched Smallbone to avoid Hornman’s fraud coming to light; and when it appeared that Miss Chittering had information that would have implicated her, had killed her as well.

Bob Horniman sells his newly-acquired share in the firm, marries Anne Mildmay, and takes up farming.

== Principal characters ==
- Mr Marcus Smallbone (deceased)
- Mr Abel Horniman, deceased senior partner and founder of the firm
- Mr Tristram (‘Tubby’) Craine, partner
- Mr Birley, partner
- Bob Horniman, solicitor, son of Abel Horniman
- Henry Bohun, newly-qualified solicitor and amateur investigator
- Eric Duxford, solicitor
- John Cove, trainee solicitor
- Miss Elizabeth Cornel, previously secretary to Abel Horniman; then to Bob Horniman
- Miss Anne Mildmay, secretary to Mr Craine
- Miss Florrie Bellbas, secretary to Eric Duxford and John Cove
- Miss Cissie Chittering, secretary to Mr Birley
- Mrs Porter, secretary
- Sergeant Cockerill, office clerk and housekeeper
- Chief Inspector Hazlerigg, police investigator

== Reception and critical appraisal ==
On the book's first appearance, Margery H Oates of the New York Times noted the "tense atmosphere" and called it "a first-rate job". "The author is a lawyer who looks at the law and the people in it with equal parts of mirth and wisdom".

A later appraisal comes from the 1973 Catalogue of Crime by Barzun and Taylor who called the book "Gilbert's masterwork". They noted that the motives are 'good', and the detection by Inspector Hazlerigg and an amateur assistant 'excellent'. The two murders they considered to be 'splendid'.

In a 1984 review, George N Dove noted that Smallbone Deceased is widely considered to be Gilbert's most successful novel. It has, he said, an air of bright originality along with the characteristically plausible atmosphere of a solicitor's firm, dry whimsical wit, and a serene atmosphere that is shattered by a sensational murder. There is an especially strong playful portrayal of the English lawyer's talent for solemn pomposity. The book is important in Gilbert's development as a transition toward the police procedural novel, a form in which he would later excel.

In the Guardian's 2006 obituary of the author, HRF Keating described the novel as "a classic of the genre ... rich with everyday details of a law practice, both good and naughty, dancing too with pawky humour; at the same time it sets a puzzle to please the most exigent of readers". The Telegraph's obituary also praised it as "one of his finest novels".

The novel has regularly appeared in 'Top 100' lists. In 1987 Keating featured the novel among the 100 best crime and mystery books ever published, writing that the book "is in every way as good as those of Agatha Christie at her best: as neatly dovetailed, as inherently complex yet retaining a decent credibility, and as full of cunningly-suggested red herrings". In 1990 the book was included in the list of The Top 100 Crime Novels of All Time published by the British-based Crime Writers' Association, and in 1995 the Mystery Writers of America included it in their Top 100 Mystery Novels of All Time.

In The Story of Classic Crime in 100 Books (2017) Martin Edwards wrote that Michael Gilbert had "exploited his knowledge of life in a solicitors’ practice to witty effect in one of the finest workplace-based detective novels". Edwards also wrote the introduction to the 2019 British Library reissue in which he said that the book "blends in masterly fashion an authentic setting, pleasingly differentiated characters, smoothly readable prose, and a clever puzzle". He opined that few British detective stories of the Fifties came close to matching it in quality.

== Bibliography ==
- Dove, George N (1984). "Michael Gilbert". In Bargainnier, Earl F. (ed.). Twelve Englishmen of Mystery. Bowling Green, Ohio: Bowling Green University popular Press. ISBN 0-87972-250-9.
