= Into Battle (thriller) =

1997 suspense novel by Michael Gilbert

First edition (UK)

Into Battle is a mystery-suspense novel by the British crime writer Michael Gilbert, first published by Robert Hale in England in 1997 and by Carroll & Graf in the United States in 1997. It was Gilbert's 29th novel and the second of three featuring his final set of recurring characters, Luke Pagan and Joe Narrabone. Set near the beginning of World War I, it has, along with its fictional characters and situations, references to actual events of the time, and a number of actual historical personages also play roles in the book. Gilbert, who was appointed CBE in 1980, was a founder-member of the British Crime Writers' Association. The Mystery Writers of America named him a Grand Master in 1988 and in 1990 he was presented Bouchercon's Lifetime Achievement Award.

== Plot ==
Unusually for Gilbert, only about one third of the book's events take place in his usual locale of London. The book, which is really three related stories around a single theme, is set first in the great British naval base of Portsmouth, then in London, and then for the final third in war-torn France. Luke Pagan, formerly a London policeman and now a young recruit in MO5, the new intelligence service headed by Vernon Kell, is an undercover agent posing as a waiter in a Portsmouth hotel. Elements of the German fleet are in port, and he hopes to gain information about German plans for what most observers believe to be an impending war. His old friend Joe Narrabone, also a former London policeman, has been sent to Portsmouth to assist him. In his guise as a waiter, Luke encounters Erich Krieger, a wily and ruthless German saboteur-intelligence agent now passing as a haughty British major residing in Portsmouth. Pagan and Narrabone unravel the details of Krieger's ingenious espionage, but Krieger escapes before he can be arrested. The second part of the book shifts to London, where Krieger has assumed another identity in the first days of the war and is contributing to the deadly sabotage of British warships. With help from Vernon Kell and Admiral William (Blinker) Hall, soon to be the real-life head of Naval Intelligence, they once again thwart some of Krieger's schemes, rounding up a number of German agents in the process. But, as before, Krieger succeeds in escaping. On the assumption that Krieger is still posing as an English officer, but now in France somewhere near the front lines, Luke and Joe are sent to an important transit camp for British troops near the coastal resort of Le Touquet in northern France to continue their pursuit. Working with both British officers and French villagers and fishermen, Pagan and Narrabone use their usual unorthodox methods to eventually track down Krieger in a series of caverns, where he is leading a sizeable group of British deserters. With lethal help from a vengeful French teenager, they bring their hunt, and the book, to an explosive conclusion.

== Reviews ==
From Publishers Weekly, which writes pre-publication reviews for the publishing industry and libraries:

Gilbert reaches back to WWI in this entertaining story of fledgling counter-espionage agents and their equally fledgling spy agency ... Gilbert artfully melds history and espionage into an interesting and intriguing tale.

From Library Journal:

This World War I thriller follows English intelligence operative Luke Pagan...from England to France as he attempts to outwit German spy Erick [sic] Krieger. Violence and suspense from a dependable veteran.
