= Love Is Dead and We Killed Her =

Studio album by Doll Skin
- Released: June 28, 2019
- Genre: Punk rock; alternative rock; pop punk
- Length: 37:57
- Label: Hopeless Records
- Producer: Will McCoy; Mike Green

Doll Skin chronology
Manic Pixie Dream Girl (2017)	Love Is Dead and We Killed Her (2019)

Singles from Love Is Dead and We Killed Her
- 1. "Mark My Words" Released: April 23, 2019; 2. "Empty House" Released: May 22, 2019; 3. "Outta My Mind" Released: June 24, 2019

Professional ratings
Review scores
Source	Rating
Kerrang	4/5 stars
The Soundboard	6/10

Love Is Dead and We Killed Her is the second and final studio album by American pop punk band Doll Skin. It is the band's third recorded release, following 2015's In Your Face EP and their debut studio album Manic Pixie Dream Girl in 2017. The album was released on June 28, 2019. The first single from the album, "Mark My Words", was released on April 23, 2019.

In December 2019, Billboard ranked "Mark My Words" at #14 on their list of 'The 25 Best Rock & Alternative Songs of 2019'

== Track listing ==
All tracks are written by Doll Skin and Will McCoy except where noted.

No.	Title	Writer(s)	Length
1.	"Don't Cross My Path"		3:22
2.	"Love Is Dead and We Killed Her"	Doll Skin, McCoy, Mike Green	3:07
3.	"Mark My Words"	Doll Skin, Green	3:27
4.	"No Fear"		3:54
5.	"Outta My Mind"		3:23
6.	"Ink Stains"		3:03
7.	"Nasty Man"		3:29
8.	"Your Idols Are Dying"		3:22
9.	"Empty House"	Doll Skin, McCoy, Matt Good	3:28
10.	"When They Show Their Teeth"	Doll Skin	3:08
11.	"Homesick"	Doll Skin, McCoy, Green	4:14
Total length:			37:57

== Personnel ==
Band

- Syd Dolezal – lead vocals, rhythm guitar
- Alex Snowden – lead guitar, backing vocals
- Nicole Rich – bass, backing vocals
- Meghan Herring – drums, backing vocals

Technical Personnel

- Will McCoy – production, mixing
- Mike Green – executive producer
- Alan Douches – mastering
- Cath Connell – artwork and layout

== Charts ==
Chart (2019)	Peak position
US Heatseekers Albums (Billboard)	10
US Independent Albums (Billboard)	35
US Rock Album Sales (Billboard)	39
US Alternative Album Sales (Billboard)	19
