= Elfe =

The Elfe was a French automobile, manufactured in Lavallois, Paris, from 1919 until about 1925 by Ateliers Defrance Freres. The company was founded by M. Eugene Mauve, who was also the instigator of the Bol d'Or race for cyclecars and latterly motorcycles, now held at the Le Mans circuit in France. During its brief life, the company entered numerous races, under various names including ELFE, Elfe-Anzani, Elfe-DeFrance and Mauve.

== Types ==
The cars produced can be divided into four broad categories:

1. The prototype monocar. Exhibited at the 1919 Paris Salon, this was an attractive single seater, finished in burnished aluminium and mahogany. A two-cylinder engine powered the rear wheels via a motorcycle gearbox and belt final drive.
2. The two-seater racing car/monocar First seen in the 1921 Paris-Nice trial, this unconventional design utilised a U-section chassis of timber and steel construction with rear-mounted, air-cooled Anzani vee-twin engine. No gearbox or clutch were fitted, requiring the passenger to push-start and leap aboard. The passenger has no backrest, save for the exhaust pipe and must place his feet on pegs outboard of the chassis, or must alternatively ride "backwards". At least two racing cars were made, as evidenced by contemporary team photographs. Depending on the event, numerous detail differences can be seen to the bodywork and mechanical arrangements. Variants illustrated include single-seaters, tandem two-seaters with and without bodywork. The cars with bodywork were fitted with a distinctive design of dummy radiator cowl, featuring a gothic arch, also used on the more conventional racing cyclecars.
3. The two-seater racing cyclecar. Also exhibited at the Paris Salon in 1919, 1921 and 1923 was a more conventional two-seater with staggered accommodation for the driver and passenger, various engines (air and water-cooled), motorcycle gearbox and final drive by chain. Contemporary race photographs held by the French National Library show numerous detail differences between individual ELFE / DeFrance cars, suggesting that they were made as one-offs, with the design rapidly evolving. Variants with both conventional quarter elliptic and centre-pivot front axles can be seen with a variety of body styles, ranging from the conventional to the distinctive gothic-arched radiator design also seen on the tandem racers. In 1923, the Defrance cyclecar was finally catalogued at the Paris Salon, this time with track 1.08m, wheelbase of 2.5m, 700 x 75 tyres and a 4-cylinder engine of 900cc.
4. The final Mauve car. The final car to be produced by the works was the badged as a Mauve. It was a conventional two-seat sports car, catalogued in 1923 and 1924. The layout was in-line front, rear-wheel drive with semi-elliptic springs all round. Power came from a water-cooled all-aluminium Anzani 1086 cc OHC engine giving 31 bhp . The engine/gearbox was mounted longitudinally at the front of the vehicle and propelled the rear axle via a cardan shaft. In the 1923 Paris Salon catalogue the Mauve car was listed in the under 350Kg cyclecar category with a track of 1.1m, 2.3m wheelbase and a 4-cylinder engine of 945cc with 3-speed gearbox. There is one known survivor.

== Contemporary Reviews ==
In 1921, The French publication Omnia (Revue Practique de l’Automobile) carried a brief review and specifications of the ELFE in the cyclecars under 350 Kg section. The car, described somewhat disparagingly by Omnia as the "flying laboratory of M. Mauve" was listed with a 4 cylinder engine of 58mm bore by 98mm stroke (1036cc), magneto ignition, multi-plate clutch, 3-speed and reverse motorcycle gearbox with final drive by chain, 1.05m track, 2.2m wheelbase, rear wheel brakes (only) and 700 x 80 pneumatic tyres. Contemporary publications carry advertisements for the ELFE with a variety of V-twin and 4 cylinder engines from Anzani, Vapor and ELFE’s own.

== Survivors ==
A reconstruction of a 1921 Elfe racing cyclecar was built by the museum L'atelier des Pionniers of Galardon, France around an original Anzani engine. The car has been demonstrated at numerous events, including the Vintage Revival at Montlhery. There is only one known survivor of the two-seater racing cyclecar, which was advertised for sale on Leboncoin.fr in July 2012 and later auctioned by Richard Edmonds in the UK in November 2017. There is one known survivor of the Mauve cyclecar, photographed at the Vaucluse Vintage Rallye in France, in 2008.
