= The Empty House (novel) =

1978 suspense novel by Michael Gilbert

First edition (UK)

The Empty House is a novel of suspense by the British author Michael Gilbert published in England by Hodder and Stoughton in 1978 and in the United States by Harper & Row in 1979. It was Gilbert's 19th novel and does not fall into one neat category. Over his long career, Gilbert wrote many kinds of novels, from police procedurals to espionage thrillers, from courtroom dramas to chase and adventure, from cathedral and public school mysteries to tales of municipal corruption. Like the works of his near contemporaries Victor Canning and Ross Thomas, many of his works examined the amorality and sometimes lethal reactions of those in high government positions when confronted by events that run contrary to their wishes. The Empty House combines many of these elements in sometimes unexpected and startlingly violent ways.

== Plot ==
Written with Gilbert's usual urbane and understated style, the events mostly take place in the West Country of southwestern England, around the small cities and moors of Exmoor and Dartmoor and its extremely dangerous seacoast.

The Empty House begins with the apparent death of Alexander Wolfe, a genius-level biologist working at the Biological Warfare Research Station under the close supervision of the Army's Western Command Headquarters at Exeter. His car has plunged, apparently accidentally, off a cliff far from the main roads into the churning waters of the Celtic Sea below, waters so turbulent that no thought is even given to trying to recover the car or his body. Wolfe has recently taken out a large, and unusual, insurance policy that specifies that if his body is ever lost at sea and never recovered, he is to be presumed dead and his sister shall be paid a large amount of money. The unhappy insurance underwriters send a young but highly qualified adjuster, Peter Manciple, to look into the peculiar circumstances of Wolfe's disappearance and to recommend whether the claim should be paid or not. A personable young man, Peter spends the next couple of weeks moving from town to town and one overnight stay to the next, meeting a variety of interesting people and gradually coming to a conclusion as to what has happened to Alexander Wolfe. Even for Gilbert, a writer who was comfortable writing many types of thrillers and mysteries, The Empty House contains an unusual number of disparate elements: there are domestic scenes; chases and violence on the moors; cross-country Buchanesque escapes; sympathetic but murderous Israeli agents; even more murderous Palestinian agents; stolid policemen; clever lawyers; affable innkeepers; shrewd schoolmasters; relentless Army soldiers and counter-agents; and unexpected shifts from one apparent sort of story to the next. In the end, in one final surprise, Manciple delivers his report to his employers, rejects an offer from the Army to join its counter-intelligence group, and goes off to become a schoolmaster at Blundell's School.

Gilbert himself was a most Establishment figure, frequently writing about other Establishment figures, and was usually firmly on the side of England's police forces and shadowy (though lethal) Intelligent departments. In The Empty House, however, there is a sharp edge to the entire story that is entirely in keeping with what one of Gilbert's American editors said about him after his death in 2006, many years after the publication of this book: "He's not a hard-boiled writer in the classic sense, but there is a hard edge to him, a feeling within his work that not all of society is rational, that virtue is not always rewarded.".

== Reception ==
The New York Times found it up to Gilbert's usual standard:

Michael Gilbert can always be relied on for a sharply written, tautly constructed book, and his newest, THE EMPTY HOUSE (Harper and Row, $9.95), does not disappoint. Mr. Gilbert gives us a scientist who vanishes when his car hurtles over a cliff. There seems to be no doubt about the accident, but a lot of insurance money is involved and an investigator named Peter Manciple is sent in to look things over. Manciple is a man with some unusual gifts, all of which he has to use before he winds things up. The dead man, it turns out, was a top man in biological warfare. Thus, the British Government gets into the act. As Manciple starts making headway, people start getting killed. Mr. Gilbert handles all this in his usual suave manner.

Kirkus Review, however, was somewhat less enthusiastic:

British bio-warfare scientist Alexander Wolfe is presumed dead when his car is seen careening off a west-coast English cliff into the sea; but young insurance adjuster Peter Manciple is sent to investigate—something seems fishy. And Peter's suspicions are confirmed when he finds himself being followed, and when one of Wolfe's colleagues disappears and is soon found dead. Convinced that Wolfe is alive, Peter, aided by a photographic memory, picks up a scenic coastal trail to what he believes to be Wolfe's hideout—but that is only one of Peter's miscalculations. He allows himself to be seduced by a fairly obvious spy (oppressed by an insane mum, Peter's an innocent with women), and he gets caught in the crossfire between Israeli agents and assorted others—all of whom have an intense interest in Wolfe's formula for a genetic poison that can kill off a whole nation in a single generation. A well-concealed twist waits at the end of all the chasing and shooting, followed by a neat coda, but only Gilbert's dependably lean prose and the West Country atmosphere (though merely half-sketched) lift this a small notch above the level of routine spy adventure.
