= They Never Looked Inside =

1948 mystery novel by Michael Gilbert

First edition

They Never Looked Inside is the second novel by the British mystery writer Michael Gilbert. It was published in England by Hodder and Stoughton in 1948 and in the United States by Harper & Brothers in 1949 as He Didn't Mind Danger. It was Gilbert's first publication in the States. It is also the second novel to feature Gilbert's earliest recurring character, Inspector Hazlerigg. Gilbert, who was appointed CBE in 1980, was a founder-member of the British Crime Writers' Association. The Mystery Writers of America named him a Grand Master in 1988 and in 1990 he was presented Bouchercon's Lifetime Achievement Award.

== Plot and title(s) ==
The events take place mostly in post-World War II London, in either 1945 and '46 or 1946 and '47—it is difficult to put an exact date on them—and in one extended scene in France. They are told by an omniscient third-person narrator but most of the scenes involve either Inspector Hazlerigg and the workings of the Metropolitan police department or the activities of a recently mustered-out Army veteran, Major Angus McMann. It was the first of a number of novels Gilbert would write over his exceptionally long career in which organized gangs and criminal masterminds figure, both in London and, less often, in Europe. The war has ended but a large number of British troops are still stationed in Europe. Adapting the techniques and brutality of pre-war American gangs, a British crime leader who keeps his identity unknown by his ingenious use of middlemen has organized both ordinary criminal figures and newly discharged British soldiers into a profitable scheme involving both burglaries and currency smuggling. Gold and jewelry are stolen throughout England; some is smuggled to Europe by British soldiers returning to the Continent from leave. Some is melted down and recast as counterfeit gold sovereigns, which are in great demand throughout Europe and can be sold for immense profits. Other British soldiers are also being used to smuggle valuable jewelry from Europe into England, where it can be sold profitably. It is this organization that Hazlerigg and his counterparts in France and Italy have been desperately trying to shut down. Major McMann, now living temporarily at his elderly sister's home, tells Hazlerigg at their initial meeting, "I'm at a loose end. I live in London, and I don't mind work." And, as the author adds, "He didn't mind danger, either, but he didn't say so." The British title of the book is apparently derived from the fact that the British soldiers who ferry jewels and sovereigns back and forth across the Channel do so with such ingeniously crafted items as false-bottomed canteens that they never looked inside them.

== Reception ==
Upon its publication in the United States Anthony Boucher, the mystery critic of the New York Times, called it "a convincing and warmly realistic suspense story," and added that it was "a first novel to make you look forward hopefully to more Michael Gilbert." A few years later, however, although still admiring it, he said it was "a Manning Coles novel of blithe adventure" By the time he wrote this, Coles had cemented his reputation for writing rather light-hearted suspense/espionage novels involving somewhat implausible escapes from danger by his on-going hero, Tommy Hambledon.
