= Mr. Calder and Mr. Behrens =

Fictional characters by Michael Gilbert

Mr. Calder and Mr. Behrens are a fictional counter-intelligence duo created by the British mystery and thriller writer Michael Gilbert. The characters appear in 24 short stories, most of which first appeared in either the British magazine Argosy or the American Ellery Queen's Mystery Magazine. The stories were collected in two anthologies, Game without Rules (1967) and Mr. Calder & Mr. Behrens (1982). One story, "Double, Double", was later republished in an Ellery Queen paperback. Many involve finding and dealing with British traitors or deeply embedded foreign agents; a few take place in Europe; one particularly grim one is set in World War II, during which Mr. Behrens is the bomb-maker in a failed attempt to assassinate Adolf Hitler. The characters also appeared in 16 BBC radio plays, largely based on the short stories.

Gilbert, who was appointed CBE in 1980, was a founder-member of the British Crime Writers' Association. The Mystery Writers of America named him a Grand Master in 1988 and in 1990 he was presented Bouchercon's Lifetime Achievement Award.

== Biographical information ==
Gilbert's two agents are outwardly gentlemanly and urbane. Beneath their innocuous appearance, however, they are ruthless and exceedingly hard-boiled killers. They are long-time close friends who are unmarried and who live near each other in the vicinity of Lamperdown, Kent. Mr. Behrens lives at The Old Rectory, while Mr. Calder is at The Cottage, Hyde Hill. (Gilbert's own address, at which he lived for many years, and where he died at age 93, was Luddesdown Old Rectory, Cobham, Gravesend, Kent.)

Both Calder and Behrens were educated in various parts of Europe before World War II and speak a number of languages: Mr. Behrens is rated A+ for Standard-German and A for Standard-French, Standard Greek, Italian, and Russian. Mr. Calder is rated A for Standard Albanian and Hungarian and B for Standard-Greek, Italian, Arabic, and Russian.

Mr. Calder lives with Rasselas, his 128-pound Persian deerhound whom he has adopted from a dead adversary. Like his master, Rasselas is quiet and unassuming, but also a highly trained and deadly killer. He is by Shad Jehan out of Galietta. His color is "Golden with darker patches. Eyes Amber. Nose blue-black."

Both Calder and Behrens did classified work during World War II, then in the late 1950s went to work for a Mr. Fortescue at the Joint Services Standing Intelligence Committee (External Branch), more often known as JSSIC(E). In one story, the Prime Minister recalls his predecessor telling him that "E" Branch takes on the jobs "so disreputable" that no other agency will handle them. The cover of Mr. Fortescue is that of bank manager at the Westminster branch of the London and Home Counties Bank. As one adversary refers to them bitterly just before dying, both Calder and Behrens are "middle-aged cut-throats"; by the time the stories end, however, they have grown old but not noticeably softer or less capable.

Rasselas, however, in "A Prince of Abyssina", also published as "The Uninvited", is killed by a German war criminal intent on killing Mr. Calder. After rescuing his friend, Mr. Behrens then helps Mr. Calder dig a

"deep grave behind the woodpile, [they] laid the dog in it and filled it in, and patted the earth into a mound. It was a fine resting place, looking southward over the feathery tops of the trees, across the Weald of Kent. A resting place for a prince.

"Colonel Weinleben they buried later, with a good deal more haste and less ceremony, in the wood. He was the illegitimate son of a cobbler from Mainz and greatly inferior to the dog, both in birth and breeding."

== Undertones ==
In most of Gilbert's work, which seems urbane, ordered, and placid on the surface, there are grim undertones and hard edges not far below. In "A Prince of Abyssinia" Colonel Weinleben signals Mr. Calder that he is coming to kill him. "What makes you so sure?" asked Mr. Fortescue.

"I tortured him," said Mr. Calder. "And broke him. He'd never forget."

Later Colonel Weinleben takes up residence at the Seven Gables Guest House, where he goes birding and is "particularly nice with Mrs. Farmer's two young children."

"And in the evenings he would sit in the lounge, drinking a single glass of schnapps as an aperitif before dinner, and entertaining Tom and Rebecca with accounts of the birds he had observed that day. It was difficult to imagine, seeing him sitting there, gentle, placid, and upright, that he had killed men and women—and children, too—with his own well-kept hands. But then Mr. Wendon, or Weinleben, or Weber, was a remarkable man."

"Michael was an exceptionally fine storyteller, but he's hard to classify," said one of his British publishers after his death. "He's not a hard-boiled writer in the classic sense, but there is a hard edge to him, a feeling within his work that not all of society is rational, that virtue is not always rewarded.".

== Stories in which the characters appear ==
- Collected in Game without Rules
  - "The Road to Damascus"
  - "On Slay Down"
  - "The Spoilers"
  - "The Cat Cracker"
  - "Trembling's Tours"
  - "The Headmaster"
  - "Heilige Nacht"
  - "Upon the King..."
  - "Cross-Over"
  - "Prometheus Unbound"
  - "A Prince of Abyssinia"
- Collected in Mr. Calder & Mr. Behrens
  - "The Twilight of the Gods"
  - "Emergency Exit"
  - "One-to-Ten"
  - "The Peaceful People"
  - "The Lion and the Virgin"
  - "The African Tree Beavers"
  - "Signal Tresham"
  - "The Mercenaries"
  - "Early Warning"
  - "The Killing of Michael Finnegan"
  - "The Decline and Fall of Mr. Behrens"
  - "The Last Reunion"
- Anything for a Quiet Life (anthology)
  - "Anything for a Quiet Life" — brief appearance by Mr. Calder
- Ellery Queen's Mystery Parade
  - "The Terrorists" – short story (called "Double, Double" in English appearance)
- The Murder of Diana Devon and Other Mysteries
  - "Churchill's Men" — radio play
  - "St Ethelburga and the Angel of Death" — radio play

== Radio plays ==
The characters appeared in several BBC radio plays. Two were published in The Murder of Diana Devon and Other Mysteries. The plays starred Stephen Murray as Calder, Peter Howell as Behrens and Carleton Hobbs as Fortescue:

1. In Which Mr Calder Acquires a Dog — radio play broadcast 28 October 1968 (Adapted from "Emergency Exit")
2. The Peaceful People — radio play broadcast 31 October 1968
3. The Spoilers — radio play broadcast 4 & 7 November 1968
4. The Road to Damascus — radio play broadcast 11 November 1968
5. Cat Cracker — radio play broadcast 14 November 1968
6. Double, Double — radio play broadcast 18 & 21 November 1968
7. One-to-Ten — radio play broadcast 25 November 1968
8. The African Tree Beavers — radio play broadcast 28 November 1968
9. Cross-Over — radio play broadcast 2 & 5 December 1968
10. The Lion and the Virgin — radio play broadcast 9 December 1968
11. Ahmed and Ego — radio play broadcast 2 & 5 December 1968 (Adapted from "The Decline and Fall of Mr. Behrens")
12. The Mercenaries — radio play broadcast 16 December 1968
13. Churchill's Men — radio play broadcast 19 December 1968
14. Heilige Nacht — radio play broadcast 23 & 26 December 1968
15. Signal Tresham — radio play broadcast 30 December 1968
16. St Ethelburga and the Angel of Death — radio play broadcast 2 January 1969
