= Michael Gilbert =

English author and solicitor (1912–2006)

Michael Francis Gilbert CBE
- Born: 17 July 1912; Billinghay, Lincolnshire, England
- Died: 8 February 2006 (aged 93); Luddesdown, Gravesend, Kent, England
- Education: London University
- Occupations: Lawyer, author
- Children: 7, including Harriett Gilbert
- Writing career
- Period: 1947–2001
- Genres: Crime fiction, mysteries, police procedural, spy fiction

Michael Francis Gilbert CBE TD (17 July 1912 – 8 February 2006) was an English solicitor and author of crime fiction.

== Early life and education ==
Gilbert was born on 17 July 1912 in Billinghay, Lincolnshire, England, to Bernard Samuel Gilbert, a writer, and Berwyn Minna Cuthbert. From 1920 to 1926 he attended St. Peter's School in Seaford, East Sussex, and then, from 1926 to 1931, he attended Blundell's School in Tiverton, Devon. He began to study law at London University but was unable to finish due to financial concerns. After becoming a schoolmaster at Salisbury Cathedral School, Gilbert returned to studying law, receiving his degree in 1937 and graduating with honours. It was at this time that he began to work on his first mystery novel, Close Quarters.

== Military service ==
During the Second World War, Gilbert served with the British Army in North Africa and Italy with the Honourable Artillery Company. In 1943, he was captured and taken as a prisoner of war in northern Italy near Parma. Along with Eric Newby and Tony Davies, Capt. Gilbert escaped after the Italian surrender later that year, their escape involving a 500-mile journey south to reach the Allied lines.

== Law career ==
In 1947, Gilbert joined the London law firm of Trower, Still & Keeling in Lincoln's Inn. Eventually becoming a partner there, he practised law with the group until his retirement in 1983.

== Writing career ==
Gilbert's writing career spanned the years 1947 to 1999, with his final work being Over and Out (published in 1998). The genres his fiction novels enveloped included police procedurals, spy novels, short stories, courtroom dramas, classical mysteries, adventure thrillers, and crime novels. Following his death, The New York Times quoted one of Gilbert's publishers regarding his writing style: "Michael was an exceptionally fine storyteller, but he's hard to classify. He's not a hard-boiled writer in the classic sense, but there is a hard edge to him, a feeling within his work that not all of society is rational, that virtue is not always rewarded."

Unlike many other fiction writers of the mystery and crime genre, Gilbert did not make use of a single recurring character. His works, however, did include characters that would appear irregularly: Inspector Hazlerigg; Inspector Petrella; Chief Superintendent Morrissey; Detective Chief Inspector Mercer, Mr. Calder and Mr. Behrens. Posthumously, four collections of his short stories were published. By 2016, his works consisted of 30 novels and approximately 185 stories in 13 collections. In addition to his novels, Gilbert wrote several stage plays along with numerous radio and television plays.

Gilbert was known for writing only during his five-times-a-week commute by train between his home in Kent and Lincoln's Inn. He said that doing so allowed him to "carry out a full and normal day's work as a solicitor, and to devote the evenings and weekends to my family". Gilbert wrote 500 words a day during the 50-minute morning train trip, preferring "a bit of hustle and bustle" to silence while writing. Stating that commuting was a "perfectly natural thing to do", he mused that after retirement he would "have to find a railway journey every morning ... I'd have to go somewhere by train in order to continue writing".

While Gilbert's earlier works were set in courtrooms and the offices of lawyers, his later works depicted police investigations and criminal acts. Some of Gilbert's novels were set in a boys' boarding school. Others were about a serial thrill killer (The Night of the Twelfth); a television action hero and military advisor to the ruler of an Arab sheikdom (The Ninety-Second Tiger); suspense in Communist Hungary just prior to the 1956 uprising (Be Shot for Sixpence); municipal corruption in a seaside town (The Crack in the Teacup); Etruscan art relics (The Family Tomb); and IRA terrorists (Trouble).

== Music ==
Gilbert apparently had an abiding interest in, and deep knowledge of, music. Many of his earlier books contain scenes, some of them quite lengthy, involving choirs, in churches, cathedrals, boarding schools, and neighbourhood organizations. Additionally, a number of his secondary characters are accomplished musicians of one kind or another, some of them at the professional level. He also occasionally uses musical references to indicate a sudden change of direction in his present story. In a typical example from Paint, Gold and Blood (1989), the protagonist has just received an unexpected letter from an old school friend and opens the envelope:

A single note from a flute, or perhaps from a clarinet, had interrupted the rhythm of the tympani and the strings to announce the start of a new movement.

== Legacy, honours, critical acclaim ==
In 1980, Gilbert was appointed a Commander of the Order of the British Empire (CBE). Writing honours include a Diamond Dagger from the Crime Writers' Association for lifetime achievement in 1994, and being named a "grandmaster" by the Mystery Writers of America in 1988.

One of Gilbert's earliest works, Smallbone Deceased (1950), was included in crime-writer H. R. F. Keating's list, Crime & Mystery: The 100 Best Books. In Gilbert's New York Times obituary, his American publisher, Kent Carroll of Carroll & Graf, was quoted as saying: "He was always so utterly urbane and civilized. He wrote about a sordid world from the perspective of a gentleman. There was something comforting as well as exciting about that.

British mystery writer and critic Julian Symons referred to Gilbert as a writer who chose not to offer "personal feelings about the world and society" but to write "what will amuse his audience, and if an idea or a subject seems disturbing it is put aside". Symons went on to state, "Yet there remains an impression that he is not quite content to be appreciated just as an entertainer, but that some restraint (legal caution, perhaps) checks him from writing in a way that fully expresses his personality".

== Personal life and death ==
Gilbert married Roberta Mary Marsden in 1947; together the couple had two sons and five daughters. One daughter, Harriett, born in 1948, became a novelist and broadcaster for the BBC World Service.

Gilbert died at the age of 93 on 8 February 2006 at his home in Luddesdown, Gravesend, Kent. He was survived by Roberta, his wife of nearly sixty years, and all of their children.

== Published works ==
=== Mystery novels ===
- Close Quarters (1947) – introduction of Chief Inspector Hazlerigg
- They Never Looked Inside (1948) [U.S. He Didn't Mind Danger (1949)] – Chief Inspector Hazlerigg
- The Doors Open (1949) – Chief Inspector Hazlerigg
- Smallbone Deceased (1950) – Chief Inspector Hazlerigg
- Death Has Deep Roots (1951) – Chief Inspector Hazlerigg
- Death in Captivity (1952) [U.S. The Danger Within]
- Fear to Tread (1953) – a small but important role for Superintendent Hazlerigg
- Sky High (1955) [U.S. The Country-House Burglar]
- Be Shot for Sixpence (1956). Serialised in U.S. newspapers as High Spy (1957)
- Blood and Judgement (1959) [U.S. Blood and Judgment] – Patrick Petrella's first appearance in a novel
- After the Fine Weather (1963). Serialised in the USA (1963)
- The Crack in the Teacup (1966)
- The Dust and the Heat (1967) [U.S. Overdrive (1968)]
- The Etruscan Net (1969) [U.S. The Family Tomb (1970)]
- The Body of a Girl (1972)
- The Ninety-second Tiger (1973)
- Flash Point (1974)
- The Night of the Twelfth (1976)
- The Empty House (1978)
- Death of a Favourite Girl (1980) [U.S. The Killing of Katie Steelstock]
- The Final Throw (1982) [U.S. End-Game]
- The Black Seraphim (1983)
- The Long Journey Home (1985)
- Trouble (1987)
- Paint, Gold and Blood (1989)
- The Queen Against Karl Mullen (1991)
- Roller-Coaster (1993)
- Ring of Terror (1995)
- Into Battle (1997)
- Over and Out (1998)

=== Collections of short stories ===
- Game Without Rules (1967)
- Stay of Execution (1971)
- Amateur in Violence (Davis Publications, 1973)
- Petrella at Q (1977)
- Mr. Calder and Mr. Behrens (1982)
- Young Petrella (1988)
- Anything for a Quiet Life (Carroll & Graf,1990)
- The Man Who Hated Banks and other mysteries (Crippen & Landru, 1997)
- The Mathematics of Murder: A Fearne & Bracknell Collection (Robert Hale, 2000)
- The Curious Conspiracy (Crippen & Landru, 2002)
- Even Murderers Take Holidays and Other Mysteries (Robert Hale, 2007)
- A Pity About the Girl and Other Stories (Robert Hale, 2008)
- The Murder of Diana Devon and Other Mysteries (Robert Hale, 2009)
- The Man Who Could Not Sleep and Other Mysteries (Robert Hale, 2011) – radio plays & play synopses

=== Non-fiction ===
- The Claimant: The Tichborne Case Revisited (Constable and Company, 1959)

=== Bibliographic works ===
- The Short Stories of Michael Gilbert. An Annotated Checklist, 1948–1997, by B. A. Pike, gives details of some 170 short stories (1998)

== Bibliography ==
- Dove, George N (1984). "Michael Gilbert". In Bargainnier, Earl F. (ed.). Twelve Englishmen of Mystery. Bowling Green, Ohio: Bowling Green University popular Press. ISBN 0-87972-250-9.
