= Inspector Hazlerigg =

Fictional police detective created by Michael Gilbert

- First appearance: Close Quarters
- Last appearance: Fear to Tread
- Created by: Michael Gilbert

In-universe information
- Gender: Male
- Title: Chief Inspector, Chief Superintendent
- Occupation: Police officer
- Nationality: English

Inspector Hazlerigg is a police detective created by the British mystery writer Michael Gilbert who appears in six novels published between 1947 and 1958, as well as in 20 short stories. Although he plays a key role in each of the novels, he is far from being the main character in all of them; in some, particularly Death Has Deep Roots and Fear to Tread, his page appearances are quite limited. In his first appearance, in the Golden Age mystery novel Close Quarters, which takes place in 1937, Hazlerigg is a Chief Inspector at New Scotland Yard in London. By the final novel in the series, Fear to Tread, he has become a Chief Superintendent.

== Biography ==
Thirty years before the events in Close Quarters, and before going to London, he had attended a preparatory school of which he now remembers little except that the masters had seemed much happier than the boys. In the short story Modus Operandi we are told that he came to London from Norfolk at the age of 17, which would place his year of birth at 1890. He began by "pounding a beat in Whitechapel." The first time we see him in Close Quarters he is "a thick square man with a brick-red face" and unmarried. A few pages further, after he raises an imaginary gun to his shoulder and fires it, a character thinks that he looks like "a jolly red-faced farmer out for a day's sport". Besides smoking an occasional pipe or Indian cheroot, he has "a heavy jowl and shrewd grey eyes". We are told that he is a mountaineer, with a "fair head for heights". Sitting in his office in Scotland Yard several years later, just after the war, he has a "heavy, Cromwellian face". And in his last appearance in a novel he is:

unmistakably a policeman, although he could also have been a farmer. He was thick set and had a red-brown face and grizzled hair.... Perhaps the only remarkable thing about him was his eyes. They were that shallow grey which, like the grey of the North Sea, can change without warning from friendliness to bleak wrath.

Also in Close Quarters we are told that of his many policeman-like qualities the chief one was "Concentration. Tireless, relentless, implacable concentration.... And yet something more than that. Selective concentration." In Modus Operandi we are told that "his chief asset is that he looks so honest that no one ever attempts to bribe him" and that he has a "shrewd ability to see around corners, which came from his father, who was a poacher." And he has, of course, "a rigid sense of right and wrong."

== Appearances by Hazlerigg ==
=== In novels ===
- Close Quarters (1947) — introduction of Chief Inspector Hazlerigg. He first appears on page 74 of the 251-page American edition
- They Never Looked Inside (1948) [U.S. He Didn't Mind Danger (1949)] — he first appears on page 12 of a 191-page British reprint and is still a Chief Inspector
- The Doors Open (1949) — he first appears on page 79 of the 287-page American edition and is still a Chief Inspector
- Smallbone Deceased (1950) — he first appears on page 42 of a 192-page British reprint and is still a Chief Inspector
- Death Has Deep Roots (1951) — two short appearance, one at the beginning, one at the end, and is still a Chief Inspector
- Fear to Tread (1953) — short but important role for Chief Superintendent Hazlerigg—he does not appear until page 154 of the 223-page British edition

=== In collections of short stories ===
- Stay of Execution (1971) — two stories
- Amateur in Violence (1973) — three stories
- Young Petrella (1987) — a small role in two Inspector Petrella stories
- The Man Who Hated Banks (1997) — seven stories, including one told in the first person; plus a role in a Henry Bohun story and a mention in another Bohun story
- The Curious Conspiracy (2002) — one story

== Adaptations ==
The short story Amateur in Violence was adapted into the 1960 film The Unstoppable Man with Marius Goring as Hazlerigg (spelled Hazelrigg).

Smallbone Deceased was twice adapted for BBC Radio: in 1971 starring Paul Daneman, and in 1987 with Hywel Bennett.
