= Chief Superintendent Morrissey =

Chief Superintendent Morrissey is a fictional policeman at New Scotland Yard who appears, or is at least mentioned in passing, in a number of short stories and two novels by the British mystery and thriller writer Michael Gilbert. In the 1972 The Body of a Girl, he is the CID boss of No. 1 District, "a large, white-faced Cockney Jew" with a grin that "exposed two gold-capped teeth." He also features in Gilbert's End-Game (1982). In the Inspector Mercer story "The Man in the Middle" he plays a minor role. Here he is described as "more than two hundred pounds of fighting policeman, still as formidable as when he had climbed into the ring to win the heavyweight championship of the Metropolitan Force." In the follow-up story, "The Man at the Top", Morrissey plays a much more important role, and the criminal mastermind, Mr. Henderson, says admiringly of him:

He used to be the CID head of Number 1 District. Now I hear he's in charge of the Metropolitan section of the Special Crimes Squads. Ten years ago I watched him boxing in the police heavyweight finals. He didn't just knock his man down....He knocked him clean out of the ring"

In the short story "A Very Special Relationship" Morrissey directs the police search for a gang of murderous criminals." The head of the gang, just before he is shot to death by the widow of a murdered policeman, says of him, "The old bastard... He's no gentleman.""
