= Andar =

Andar may refer to:

- Andar District, Ghazni province, Afghanistan
- Andar, Ghazni, town in the Andar District of Ghazni Province, Afghanistan
- Andar, Fars, Iran
- Andar, Kurdistan, Iran
- Andar, Tehran, Iran
- Andar (Pashtun tribe), a Pashtun sub-tribe
- Andar-Andar, sword of Indonesia
- Andar, Siwan, a community development block in India

== See also ==
- Andor (disambiguation)
