= Breaking and Entering (Keating novel) =

2000 novel by H.R.F. Keating

- Front cover art for Breaking and Entering by H.R.F. Keating, 1st Edition,
- Author: H.R.F. Keating
- Cover artist: Cover photo by Joe Partridge
- Language: English
- Series: Inspector Ghote
- Genre: Crime
- Publisher: Macmillan
- Publication place: United Kingdom
- English publication date: 10 November 2000
- Media type: Print (hardback)
- Pages: 272 (hardcover 1st edition)
- ISBN: 978-0-333-90279-0
- Dewey Decimal: 823/.914 21
- LC Class: PR6061.E26 B74 2000
- Preceded by: Bribery, Corruption Also
- Followed by: Inspector Ghote's First Case (publication order)

Breaking and Entering is a crime novel by H.R.F. Keating. It is the twenty-fourth novel in the Inspector Ghote series.

== Plot introduction ==
Inspector Ghote has been assigned to investigate a string of cat-burglaries. The burglar, nicknamed Yeshwant after a Hindu lizard god by the newspapers, demonstrates remarkable climbing skills. However, the case Ghote really wants to investigate is the murder of Anil Ajmani. Ghote is unexpectedly rejoined by his old friend Axel Svensson, formally of UNESCO, who aids and hampers Ghote's investigation. Only when Ghote's investigation reaches its climax does he realise that perhaps he has been on the right case all along.

== Plot summary ==
Ghote reflects on his misfortune in being assigned to a case of burglary instead of the murder of Anil Ajmani. By chance he encounters Axel Svensson, once an analyst for UNESCO who worked with Ghote in The Perfect Murder. Ghote immediately feels sorry for Axel, who is visiting India after the death of his wife. Ghote agrees, against his better judgement, to let Axel assist in his investigation.

The next day Ghote rejoins Axel to learn the big Swedish man has been frightened by the urban legend of "The Kidney Heist". Together they visit and interview a victim of the cat burglar "Yeshwant". Axel is surprised by the deferential treatment Ghote gives to the victim and comments afterward that a witness would be handled differently in Sweden. The two argue.

Later they meet Pinkie, the journalist who gave the cat burglar the nickname "Yeshwant", who is keen to get new information from Ghote. With Pinkie's assistance they interview a witness who is reluctant to let them look for clues in her bedroom. When they leave, Ghote wonders whether all the stolen jewellery came from "Pappubhai Chimanlal and Company".

Ghote interviews the brother of the last victim, who owns a shop called Video Valley. Ghote concludes the man, while in financial trouble, is not in league with the cat burglar. Next Ghote interviews Mrs Masbahn, who had a diamond ring stolen. Mrs Masbahn says she bought the ring from Karamdas and Sons, at the urging of her lover, a drunken poet named Bottlewalla. Bottlewalla, however, remembers things differently. The couple quarrelled over where to buy the ring, with her favouring Karamdas and Sons and he Pappubhai Chimanlal and Company. Bottlewalla insists the ring was bought from Pappubhai Chimanlal.

Mr Pappubhai Chimanlal is polite but does not allow Ghote to interview his employees, referring to his extensive staff vetting procedures and staff moral. Axel is furious with this lack of assistance. Mr Chimanlal tells them his secretary, Miss Cooper, is the only member of staff beside himself who knows the details of every transaction to take place in the store. Ghote presses to interview Miss Cooper but, in Axel's absence, Mr Chimanlal confides that Miss Cooper is a lonely, loveless woman, and to ensure her complete loyalty he seduced once her many years ago.

Undeterred, Ghote and Axel seek out Miss Cooper. She denies providing information to the cat burglar. Ghote presses her but she continues to protest her innocence and eventually, Ghote relents and accepts her innocence. Outside, Axel deduces the only other person out who might know all the transactions carried out at the jewellers is Mr Pappubhai Chimanlal's wife.

At interview Mrs Chimanlal tells them the Indian folk story of the sparrow and crow. The sparrow builds a nest of wax and the crow builds a nest of dung. The rains come and wash away the crow's nest. The crow begs the sparrow for shelter. When the crow insists on being let in, the sparrow admits the crow to her home, and invites the crow to dry herself on the stove. The crow does so and is burnt to death. This is Mrs Chimanlal's way of warning the detectives that her husband has influence and she can make life difficult for them.

Ghote realises that she is wearing a necklace very like one described in the list of stolen items. He persuades Mrs Chimanlal to swing back on the swing seat she is sitting on and Axel takes a photo. As she does Ghote sees the necklace clearly and realises it is indeed stolen property. Ghote accuses her of being Yeshwant.

Mrs Chimanlal admits she is Yeshwant, saying it was such fun to commit the crimes. Bartering for her freedom, she tells what she knows of Anil Ajmani's residence, which she surveyed for a robbery that never took place. Mrs Chimanlal promises that she will never again climb as Yeshwant and will return all the stolen items. Ghote is forced to content himself with this, as Mrs Chimanlal's money and political influence means Ghote cannot convict her. Ghote also instructs Yeshwant to anonymously call Pinkie Dinkarrao the journalist and provide a tip that the Yeshwant is out of business.

Investigating the murder of Anil Ajmani without orders, Ghote requests Pinkie's assistance in trailing Mr Masters, the chief of security. Later Ghote realises that Ajmani's daughter is Mrs Patel, one of the victims of Veshwant.

The next day Ghote finds Axel distraught after being tricked into parting with a large amount of money when a local lured him to the funeral of a local child. Together they go to interview Mr Masters, only to find that Pinkie has arrived first and accidentally alerted him, who has taken all his property and vacated his secret hideaway.

Pinkie is unharmed, though shaken, and Ghote and Axel put her in a taxi and bid her goodbye. At a nearby restaurant Ghote extracts information from the owner, who says Masters claimed he was going to Andari.

Ghote and Axel visit Ivy Cooper, whose father they hope may have information about a club they believe Masters belongs to. They find her embroiled in an argument with a neighbour over a clogged drain. Ghote is forced to repair the drain to restore calm before he can ask his questions.

Miss Cooper's father returns and Ghote questions him to see what he knows about Mr Victor Masters. The old man identifies Victor Masters as Victor Hinks, who was sacked from the railway and denied membership to the retired rail workers club. Miss Cooper knows that Victor Hinks left his wife and children, who live near the railway station. The nearby school gives Ghote the family's address after some resistance. By interviewing Mrs Hinks Ghote learns that Victor's brother, Vincent Hinks, had a romantic attachment to Anil Ajmani's daughter. Anil Ajmani ordered Vincent's murder because of this.

Ghote deduces that (unknown to Mrs Hinks) Victor Hinks took the alias of Victor Masters and became Ajmani's head of security so he could murder Ajmani in revenge for Vincent's death. Ghote presents his findings to the Deputy Commissioner, who is at first incredulous. Ghote suggests that they arrest Victor when he collects his last pay cheque from his job as Security Chief. The Deputy Commissioner leaves to make the arrest, promising Ghote a more important case as a reward.

== Characters in "Breaking and Entering" ==
- Inspector Ganesh Ghote: A hard working and honest policeman and detective in the Crime Branch of Mumbai Police.
- Axel Svensson: Formerly an analyst for UNESCO, this Swedish detective assisted Inspector Ghote on the "Perfect Murder Case" as told in H.R.F. Keating's novel The Perfect Murder. Since that time, Axel's wife has died and he has become depressed. He has come to India in the hope of reliving the glory days of his youth and meets Ghote again by chance.
- Pinkie Dink: A young dedicated investigative journalist whose regular opinion column "Pinkie Thinks…" has made a celebrity out of the cat-burglar she calls Yeshwant.
- Ivy Cooper: An Anglo-Indian woman who works as a confidential secretary for Pappubhal Chimanlal at his jewellery shop. Described as a church going Christian and well-educated who is lonely, Chimanlal claims to have ensured her absolute loyalty by seducing her once, when she was young.
- Pappubhal Chimanlal: A successful jeweller who owns Pappubhal Chimanlal and Company. Pappubhal once seduced his secretary, Ivy Cooper, to ensure her loyalty. He is married however, to Mrs Chimanlal.
- Mrs Pappubhal Chimanlal: An award-winning gymnast in her youth, she accepted an arranged marriage and a safe, dull life with Mister Chimanlal until she decided to become Yeshwant, the cat-burglar who plagues Mumbai.

== Major themes ==
Breaking and Entering is a chalk and cheese story, with two radically different detectives being partnered together and assigned solve a difficult case that requires insights from both of them.

== Literary significance & criticism ==
The New York Times review said: "Inspector Ghote is one of the great characters of the contemporary mystery novel."

The Daily Telegraph review said: "As fresh and as entertaining as ever, an amazing 35 years since his first appearance"

The Observer newspaper called the book: "A delight"

== Allusions/references from other works ==
Axel Svensson first appeared in The Perfect Murder, the first novel in H. R. F. Keating's Inspector Ghote series.

== Allusions/references to actual history, geography and current science ==
The novel is set in Mumbai, India.

== Release details ==
- 2000, UK, Macmillan, ISBN 0-333-90279-3 / 978-0-333-90279-0, 10 November 2000, Hardback
- 2001, UK, Pan Books, ISBN 0-330-48304-8 / 978-0-330-48304-9, 9 November 2001, Paperback
- 2001, USA, St Martin's Press, ISBN 0-312-26952-8 / 978-0-312-26952-4, Hardback
