= Andor (disambiguation) =

Andor is a television series in the Star Wars universe.

Andor may also refer to:

== People ==
=== Given name ===
- Andor Ajtay (1903–1975), Hungarian actor
- Andor Basch (1885–1944), Hungarian painter
- Andor Deli (born 1977), Hungarian politician
- Andor Gomme (1930–2008), British scholar of English literature and architectural history
- Andor Jaross (1896–1946), Hungarian politician and Nazi collaborator
- André Kertész (born Kertész Andor; 1894–1985), Hungarian-born American photographer
- Andor Lilienthal (1911–2010), Hungarian chess grandmaster
- Andor Mihályi (born 2002), Hungarian fencer
- Andor Toth (1925–2006), American violinist, conductor, educator
- Andor Toth Jr. (1948–2002), American cellist

=== Surname ===
- László Andor (born 1966), Hungarian economist and politician

=== Fictional characters ===
- Cassian Andor, the titular character of Andor
- A major enemy agent in the T.H.U.N.D.E.R. Agents comic
- Andor Drakon, the main antagonist of Ancient Domains of Mystery

== Fictional locations ==
- Andor (The Wheel of Time), a fictional country in Robert Jordan's The Wheel of Time novels
- Andor (also known as Andoria), the homeworld of the fictional Andorian species from Star Trek
- Númenor (or Andor), a fictional place in J. R. R. Tolkien's writings
- Andor, a planet in the television series The Adventures of the Galaxy Rangers

== Other uses ==
- Andor Technology, a manufacturer of scientific digital cameras
- And/or, a grammatical conjunction (and logical disjunction)

== See also ==
- Ander, a given name and surname
- Andar (disambiguation)
- Andorra (disambiguation)
- Andorinha (disambiguation)
