= Under a Monsoon Cloud =

Book by H. R. F. Keating

Under A Monsoon Cloud
- Cover Art of Under A Monsoon Cloud by H. R. F. Keating, 1st Edition, Hutchinson & Co, 1986
- Author: H. R. F. Keating
- Language: English
- Series: Inspector Ghote
- Genre: Crime
- Publisher: Hutchinson & Co
- Publication date: 30 January 1986
- Publication place: United Kingdom
- Media type: Print (Hardback)
- Pages: 192 (Hardback 1st edition)
- ISBN: 978-0-09-163700-2
- OCLC: 15591920
- Dewey Decimal: 823/.914 19
- LC Class: PR6061.E26 U53 1986b
- Preceded by: The Sheriff of Bombay
- Followed by: The Body in the Billiard Room

Under A Monsoon Cloud is a crime novel by H. R. F. Keating. It is the fifteenth book in the Inspector Ghote series.

== Plot introduction ==
Inspector Ghote is assigned to Vigatpour hill station, which is due for inspection by Additional Deputy Inspector General "Tiger" Kelkar. During the inspection Kelkar, in a fit of temper, throws a heavy inkwell at the inept Sergeant Desai, killing him. Ghote and Kelkar conspire to cover up the killing, but over the brooding course of the novel, it becomes apparent that it is only a matter of time before they are brought to justice.

=== Explanation of the novel's title ===
India experiences seasonal monsoon weather, before which heavy cloud with intense heat and humidity is typical. The story begins immediately before the monsoon breaks and the weather conditions play a part in the death that is key to the plot. Over the period of one year, the time to the next monsoon, the novel builds to a crisis which Keating compares to waiting for a monsoon to break.

== Plot summary ==
Inspector Ghote is temporarily assigned to a badly run hill station at Vigatpour. Additional Deputy Inspector General "Tiger" Kelkar, a man Ghote once investigated and cleared of suspected corruption in Bats Fly at Dusk, arrives to inspect the station. The situation is worsened by Sergeant Desai, a comically inept and lazy sergeant previously briefly assigned to Ghote in Inspector Ghote Plays a Joker.

During the inspection the monsoon storm breaks. Desai, after making a string of irritating blunders, spills ink over Kelkar's uniform and Kelkar, in a fit of temper, throws the brass ink well at Desai. The inkwell strikes Desai on the head and kills him. Owing to the late hour. Ghote is the only other officer in the station at the time.

Kelkar orders Ghote to arrest him, but Ghote—a strong admirer of Kelkar's abilities as an officer—persuades Kelkar to cover up the death. Since Desai regularly tried to bet people that he could swim the nearby lake in under two hours, they take the body and dump it in the lake.

The next day, Kelkar completes his inspection and the station's normal inspector returns from sick leave, allowing Ghote to go home.

Months pass, then Ghote is summoned to the Assistant Commissioner's office where he is introduced to Sergeant Desai's sister-in-law (wife to Desai's brother). Mrs. Desai is suspicious because Desai was a good swimmer and the medical officer's report does not indicate that one sign of asphyxia by drowning is present (bluing under the fingernails). Mrs. Desai threatens to involve the newspapers and so the Assistant Commissioner agrees to an inquiry.

Days later Ghote meets the inspector assigned to the inquiry. In conversation, he mentions that things were in a mess at Vigatpore and cites as an example the untidy state of the lost property room. As soon as he mentions it, he remembers that this was where he had hidden Desai's clothing and never had time to retrieve them to otherwise dispose of them. The investigating inspector realizes this may be where Desai's missing clothes are to be found and goes off to look. Ghote realizes the inspector will find Desai's blood stained uniform jacket. He warns Kelkar, who commits suicide, leaving a note taking full responsibility. The Assistant Commissioner then sends Ghote a memo demanding an account of the events at the hill station.

Ghote fears imminent ruin. He weighs the value of the truth against that of his career and finds his career wanting. At home he is moody and silent with his wife and child. Finally he confesses everything to his wife, Protima. The least Ghote expects is demotion, but dismissal or even a criminal charge is more likely. Protima urges him to lie to protect his family. Ghote resists, but agrees to see a Hindu priest at the temple. The priest says anger leads to bewilderment, which leads to a wandering mind, which leads to the destruction of the soul. The priest warns Ghote that he is in the third phase of this cycle and asks Ghote what his skills as a policeman are worth if he cannot use them.

After this Ghote submits a false statement saying he left duty before the death and cannot shed any light on those events. This note is regarded as unsatisfactory, however, and he is suspended pending a board of inquiry. In court to testify in another case, Ghote watches as the case he had worked on collapses under the fierce defense of a Mrs. Ahmed. He realizes she would be a fine defense attorney for his own case. He engages her, but tells her he is innocent.

The inquiry hearing begins. Ghote is dismayed to learn that the prosecution will be handled by a man with a fierce reputation for cross examination. Kelkar's suicide note, which does not mention Ghote's involvement, is read into evidence.

When the inquiry adjourns, Ghote accompanies Mrs. Ahmed to a jail and assists her in gaining access to her clients. Mrs. Ahmed remarks that, if her clients were as outraged as they were entitled to be, the police would spend all their time suppressing riots. She tells Ghote that she campaigns for civil rights because her younger brother was diagnosed with leprosy and sent away to a poorly run leper colony. When she visited her brother near the foothills of the Himalayas, she found he was a beggar. She was angry about this injustice, but worked to have him moved to a better run facility. Even though she was only a young girl at that time, she succeeded. From that day on, she determined that she would fight for the poor and downtrodden.

The next day the inquiry reconvenes. First, former Inspector Nadkarni is called. He was an inspector that Ghote had trained under and also admired (mentioned in Bats Fly at Dusk). He testifies that Ghote had a great respect for Kelkar. To the surprise of Ghote and Mrs. Ahmed, the prosecutor then calls Ghote to the stand. Since the board of inquiry is not a true court of law, Ghote is obliged to take the stand where he is questioned about his investigation of Kelkar for corruption and his regard for Kelkar.

The next day, a junior officer from Vigatpour is called as a witness and Ghote fears he will be exposed. However, the prosecutor only obtains testimony that Ghote said it was midnight when he left the station. The inquiry again adjourns.

Ghote had stayed at a private home that took him in as a paying guest while working at the hill station. The next day of the inquiry, the porter who worked there is called to testify as to the time Ghote returned to the home. The old man testifies that Ghote said it was before midnight, though it felt later to him. After this, the owner of the home is called and testifies that he is certain Ghote arrived at twenty to three by an antique clock in the entryway of the home. However, Ghote recalls that there was only a blank space where the clock used to be. He tells Mrs. Ahmed who soon forces the man to admit that the clock was sold long ago and that he couldn't have seen the time on it.

The prosecutor calls the inspector assigned to the Desai case. The inspector considers Ghote's statement to the porter mentioning the time he arrived to be a trick to mislead an ignorant and confused old man. The prosecutor then calls a man who earns his living doing washing for people in Ghote's neighborhood. The man testifies that Ghote's wife, Protima, had given him an inspector's police jacket with a button that had been torn off as part of the family's washing (the button had burst off when Ghote and Kelkar picked up Desai's body). The prosecutor concludes by saying tomorrow he will call a witness to testify that Ghote and Kelkar took Desai's body to the lake draped over a bicycle.

Ghote's conscience, which has been troubling him over his lie to Mrs. Ahmed, now compels him to confess to her. However, she has a prior appointment and refuses to listen to him. Talking to his wife, Ghote is persuaded to postpone confessing until he has heard the prosecutor's witness. When the inquiry is ready to reconvene, Mrs. Ahmed is late, so Ghote cannot confess to her beforehand.

The prosecutor presents his witness, but as his testimony unfolds, Ghote realizes that the man is a professional thief. Mrs. Ahmed deftly exposes the witness's background and the inquiry board sends the witness packing. The inquiry now adjourns for the weekend.

During the weekend, Protima invites Ram, one of Ghote's childhood friends, to visit. Ram, once a fierce and angry young man, has grown into being a cheerful and successful, if legally and morally dubious, businessman. Protima has confided everything to Ram, who gently teases Ghote about his conscience and suggests bribery as a solution. Ghote angrily rejects this, but in so doing, Ram points out that he has proven that he is a policeman to the very bone. Ghote realises this is true and resolves to continue with his lie. Ghote is also reminded that former Inspector Nadkarni's ways had been very different from Kelkar's, but equally effective.

When the inquiry reconvenes, however, Ghote decides he cannot continue to deceive Mrs. Ahmed because she is a dedicated campaigner for truth and justice and confesses to her. Mrs. Ahmed asks if he intends to confess to the inquiry board and Ghote replies he will not because he has, apart from this incident, been an honest and good policeman and wishes to remain one. Mrs. Ahmed declares that she believes this, but cannot continue to actively defend him. She will call no witnesses and speak no more in his defense, but says that she will remain present so that the inquiry board will not know that she is not representing him any more.

Ghote is called to the stand and, tripped up by the weather, which varied over the night in question, misspeaks. He barely manages to recover. The inquiry adjourns and, on the way out of the building, Ghote encounters the inspector who built the case against him. The inspector accuses Ghote of bare-faced lying, of which Ghote is guilty, and Ghote responds angrily, indicating that the inquiry's presiding officer spoke favorably about his case.

The next day, the inquiry's presiding officer reads Kelkar's favorable inspection assessment of Ghote's time at the hill station into the inquiry's record. The inspector then brings out a "first information report," which he says dates from Ghote's time at the hill station, but in fact dates from some time before. This report shows that an investigation was mishandled. The prosecution alleges that Ghote is responsible and that Kelkar gave Ghote a favorable assessment in return for covering up the death of Sergeant Desai.

Ghote denounces the latest piece of evidence and persuades the inquiry presiding officer to examine the document more closely. The presiding officer discovers the date on the report has been altered to implicate Ghote and orders the inspector responsible taken into custody.

The next day, the final day of the inquiry, Ghote is asked for his Defendant's Statement. Ghote seizes this final chance to tell the truth and does so, confessing everything, but emphasizing his reasoning that Kelkar was an excellent officer, the death was accidental, that he felt obliged to deny involvement because Kelkar's note seemed to indicate that he wanted Ghote to do so, and that he believed "fully at that time" that Kelkar's legendary drive and anger against inefficiency was "altogether the best way a police officer should conduct himself." The presiding officer picks up on his wording of "at that time" and questions him as to whether he still believes it. Ghote replies "No sir,... I am believing that Mr. Kelkar's way is a very excellent way. But I see also now that there are other ways that first-class police work can be done."

The presiding officer announces that the board finds Ghote guilty and that, though he sympathizes with Ghote's reasonings, the board of inquiry will recommend dismissal from the police force. When the room empties, Ghote realizes that the "show cause notice" form has not been filled in, but has instead been left behind. This procedural error will nullify the entire inquiry. The shorthand stenographer rushes the form to the presiding officer, who deliberately ignores him and walks away, cementing Ghote's suspicion that the error was deliberate.

To celebrate, Ghote's family visits the beach for "Nareli Purnima, Coconut Day, the fixed date on which the monsoon was held to be officially over." Ghote reflects that, while anger is sometimes justified, it is best contained until an occasion when anger is truly needed.

== Characters in "Inspector Ghote" ==
Inspector Ganesh Ghote
A hard working and honest detective in the Crime Branch of Bombay police. Married to Protima Ghote with one son, Ved Ghote.

Protima Ghote
Inspector Ghote's wife. A native of Calcutta and mother to their child, Ved.

Additional Deputy Inspector General "Tiger" Kelkar
Fierce, honest and hard working police officer with a reputation for discipline and strong personal drives and a sense of honour. Known to have fiery temper. Arrives at Ghote's hill station to conduct an inspection in chapter two and in a fit of temper flings a brass ink pot at Sergeant Desai, which strikes the sergeant's head and kills him. Kelkar is persuaded to cover up the circumstances of the death. When it seems he will be exposed, Kelkar commits suicide.

Sergeant Desai
A comically inept and clumsy police sergeant. Previously the comic relief in Inspector Ghote Plays a Joker when assigned to Ghote as an assistant and recommended for a position as security guard at the Ministry for Police Affairs and the Arts. Assigned to the hill station before the start of Under A Monsoon Cloud. Accidentally killed by A.D.I.G. "Tiger" Kelkar in a fit of temper at the end of chapter two.

== Major themes ==
The major theme is that of guilt and the concealment of wrongdoing, with the eventual release that exposure of the truth can bring.

== Allusions/references to other works ==
The character Sergeant Desai appeared in Inspector Ghote Plays a Joker by H.R.F. Keating.

The character "Tiger" Kelkar appeared in Bats Fly Up for Inspector Ghote by H.R.F. Keating.

== Literary significance & criticism ==
Amazon.com reprints this paragraph from a review from Publishers Weekly:

A.D.I.G. (Additional Deputy Inspector-General) "Tiger" Kelkar has gone to Vigatpore, outside Bombay, to check on Inspector G. V. Ghote's temporary work there. In a fit of righteous temper, Kelkar throws an inkpot at a foolish sergeant, killing him. Ghote, horrified that the much-admired Kelkar's career could end with such an accident, helps dispose of the body. A year later, however, at the start of the next monsoon, the victim's family gets the case reopened. Kelkar kills himself, and Ghote is the subject of an official inquiry. Keating traces Ghote's anguished vacillation as he weighs the value of the truth against that of his own career. Laden with heavy, monsoon-season atmosphere and graced with a fully satisfying resolution, the latest Ghote adventure shows Keating still the consummate observer of human nature.

— Publishers Weekly, Reed Business Information Incorporated, Copyright 1986

The website of Tangled Web Books calls the book "the most impressive book yet about Inspector Ghote... He has never appeared a more appealing or sympathetic character", and reprints the following quotations from other reviews.

"one of the great characters of the contemporary mystery novel"

— Newgate Callendar, The New York Times Book Review

"Few if any contemporary writers are as entertaining as the remarkable H.R.F.Keating. May the redoubtable Ghote go on forever."

— Len Deighton

"It's the best."

— P.D.James

"In Under A Monsoon Cloud, Inspector Ghote and his creator, H.R.F.Keating, are in best form"

— The Listener

== Allusions/references to actual history, geography and current science ==
The story takes place in Mumbai and the surrounding area of India.

The seasonal monsoon plays a key role in the plot.

The fact that drowning causes death by asphyxia is a plot point in the novel.

== Release details ==
- 1986, United Kingdom, Hutchinson & Co, ISBN 0-09-163700-7 / 978-0-09-163700-2, 30 January 1986, Hardback
- 1986, United Kingdom, Viking Press, ISBN 0-670-80367-7 / 978-0-670-80367-5, September 1986, Hardback
- 1987, United Kingdom, Arrow Books Limited, ISBN 0-09-950380-8 / 978-0-09-950380-4, 19 February 1987, Paperback
- 1987, United Kingdom, Select Penguin, ISBN 0-14-009209-9 / 978-0-14-009209-7, September 1987, Paperback
- 1988, United Kingdom, ISIS Large Print Books, ISBN 1-85089-233-4 / 978-1-85089-233-5, March 1988, Hardback
