= Inspector Ghote Goes by Train =

1971 novel by H. R. F. Keating

Inspector Ghote Goes By Train
- Cover art for Inspector Ghote Goes By Train, 1st Edition, 1971, UK
- Author: H. R. F. Keating
- Cover artist: Unknown
- Language: English
- Series: Inspector Ghote
- Genre: Crime
- Publisher: Collins Crime Club (UK); Doubleday (US)
- Publication date: January 1971
- Publication place: United Kingdom
- Media type: Print (Hardback)
- Pages: 234 (Hardback, 1st edition)
- ISBN: 978-0-14-003972-6
- OCLC: 13725740
- Preceded by: Inspector Ghote Breaks An Egg
- Followed by: Inspector Ghote Trusts The Heart

Inspector Ghote Goes By Train is a crime novel by H. R. F. Keating. It is the seventh novel in the Inspector Ghote series.

== Plot introduction ==
Inspector Ghote's latest assignment is simple and offers a chance for rest. He is to escort a confidence trickster from Calcutta to Mumbai by railway. Ghote is looking forward to traveling in an air-conditioned compartment on the Calcutta Mail train as it passes through the Indian scenery, though his travelling companions make the journey less restful.

== Plot summary ==
The novel opens with an article in The Times of India, which names Ghote as the officer to escort fraudster A. K. Bhattacharya from Calcutta to Mumbai. Bhattacharya made a fortune selling wax fakes of ancient Indian statues as the real thing. An American professor exposed him with a cigar lighter, but Bhattacharya escaped. He has never been photographed, and only his description is known.

On the train, Ghote finds himself in a compartment with a well-dressed, charming Bengali. Ghote is reluctant to talk about his mission, and his travelling companion begins trying to guess Ghote's profession and reason for travel; his guesses are ridiculous, possibly even insulting. Eventually, he guesses that Ghote is the Inspector escorting Bhattacharya to trial.

Ghote notes the initials on his companion's luggage are A. K. B. and suspects the man may be A. K. Bhattacharya. The stranger reveals that he had read the newspaper article about Ghote and introduces himself as A. K. Bannerjee.

The next day, Ghote and Bannerjee are joined in their compartment by a pair of young backpackers travelling with an Indian Guru. The boy, Red, is British, and the girl, Mary Jane, is an American. They are hippies. Ghote argues their right to be in the compartment without tickets, but the train moves off, making it impossible for the trio to disembark. Although Red is antagonistic towards Ghote, Mary Jane charms the inspector.

The next morning, a telegram informs Ghote that the prisoner in Calcutta is actually A. K. Biswas, wanted in Mumbai for gambling offences, not Bhattacharya.

Bannerjee discovers Red has used J. R. Kipling's novel "Kim" as the source for much of his journey across India. Ghote persuades Red to take Mr. Bannerjee's photograph, but Bannerjee convinces Red to wait until the next day.

The next morning, Bannerjee oversleeps and then claims his unshaven face is unsuitable for photography. All the film proves to be missing from the camera and the luggage. Bannerjee blames thieves at the last station. Red suspects Bannerjee but can prove nothing.

At the next stop, Mr. Ramaswami joins them. He explained that his job consists of visiting each station on the railway to ensure that railway stationery and forms are only used for official purposes. Bannerjee suggests that Ramaswami falsifies his returns to save travelling so much.

Shortly thereafter, Bannerjee questions the ethics of Ghote condemning a person to jail. Ghote insists that would be the job of the magistrates and judges. Bannerjee seeks to enlist the guru as a moral ally in his cause. The guru is unhelpful, saying that a man lives his life regardless of his surroundings and brings to everyone's attention Mr. Bannerjee's use of hair dye. Bannerjee claims he dyes his hair from simple vanity, though he jokingly calls it a disguise.

Mr. Ramaswami notices the initials on Bannerjee's suitcase and accuses Bannerjee of being A. K. Bhattacharya but relents, as it seems too far-fetched.

At the last stop before Calcutta, Bannerjee persuades Ghote to get a shave from one of the local barbers. The barber Bannerjee selects speaks no language Ghote knows. The barber is deliberately very slow. The train pulls out, and Ghote has to run and jump to get on board. Ghote accuses Bannerjee of engineering the incident so that Ghote would be left behind. In a dialect that the backpackers do not speak, Bannerjee blames Red and Mary Jane, claiming that they feared Ghote would denounce them for not having visas.

The train approaches Calcutta, and Bannerjee notes that he feels as if A. K. Bhattacharya is on the train with them. He praises Bhattacharya at length and suggests that he is akin to the hippies Red and Mary Jane in that he breaks down the barriers of society that have become too rigid. In doing so, Bannerjee inadvertently incites those present to break the law, which allows Ghote to arrest him. As the train draws up to the platform, "Bannerjee" refers to Bhattacharya's scheme being exposed with a cigar lighter, which is not public knowledge. Ghote exposes and arrests Bhattacharya.

Ghote travels in a private carriage on the return journey. He has been ordered to get a confession from Bhattacharya since the authorities wish to avoid the expense of a full trial. Ghote must also escort Mr. Biswas, the card sharp, back to Mumbai for trial.

At the last minute, Red and Mary Jane board the carriage, claiming to be concerned for Bhattacharya's well-being. Bhattacharya states his intention to escape during the journey and claims he has accomplices to help him. Ghote suspects the backpackers of being Bhattacharya's accomplices.

As night falls, Ghote works on getting Bhattacharya to confess. Mary Jane argues that Bhattacharya is a force for good in society, as he boasted on the outward journey. Mary Jane believes this should be his courtroom defence.

Ghote sees Mr. Ramaswami at a station and invites him to join the party in the private carriage. Bhattacharya tries to frighten Mr. Ramaswami by claiming to be friends with Thuggee cultists, who murder travellers. Ghote rebuffs this and indicates that Bhattacharya can expect a thirty-year prison sentence. The length of the sentence horrifies Ghote's travelling companions, and Ghote goes to sleep, resolving to use a sympathetic approach to draw Bhattacharya into a confession.

The next day, Ghote suggested that the charges could be reduced if Bhattacharya pleads guilty. Bhattacharya, in turn, offers Ghote a partnership in exchange for the charges being reduced to a single, minor item. Ghote rejects this.

At lunch, Red abruptly insists on taking Ghote's photograph. The train enters a dark tunnel, and no one can see anything. Ghote finds the meal bitter and unpleasant but has a second helping to please the cook and notices that the second helping tastes different.

Ghote realises that he has been drugged. He forces himself to get up and vomit in the toilet, then collapses. Waking, he overhears Mary Jane arguing with Bhattacharya. He asks for tea, which Mary Jane helps him to drink. When the train reaches the next station, Ghote is well again. He decides to take no action against Red, who he is sure is responsible for the poisoning, out of respect for Mary Jane.

At the next station, an old lady, Mrs. Chiplanka, insists on joining their carriage. She claims to be a respectable community pillar, having once worked with Mahatma Gandhi to achieve independence from the British. Ghote notes her spectacles are fitted with ordinary window glass. He searches her luggage but finds nothing. Although Ghote suspects her of being Bhattacharya's accomplice, he can do nothing without evidence.

That afternoon, Ghote makes little progress in obtaining a confession, so he decides to wear down Bhattacharya by depriving him of sleep. Mrs. Chiplanka objects to this as it is a form of torture. Angered, Ghote accuses her of being Bhattacharya's accomplice.

Mrs. Chiplanka, embarrassed, admits that she wears the glasses for show. Gandhi told her to wear spectacles many years ago when he saw her leaning close to her work. Rather than correct the great man's mistake or worry him, Mrs. Chiplanka began wearing false glasses much like his own.

After this, Ghote realises there were no accomplices, and Bhattacharya says he will plead guilty. He makes a full statement, which Ghote takes down.

Red seems disillusioned by Bhattacharya's confession. Mary Jane comforts Red, who agrees to go to the United States of America with her.

Bhattacharya signs the statement, which is Ramaswami's witness. Tired from the long night, Ghote accepts Ramaswami's offer to guard Bhattacharya while Ghote sleeps.

An hour later, Ghote is woken. Bhattacharya has escaped. Ghote gives chase. The train is in motion, and Ghote searches the other carriages and climbs onto the roof. He finds Bhattacharya in the driver's compartment and takes him into custody. Moments later, the train arrives in Mumbai, and the novel ends.

== Characters ==
Inspector Ganesh Ghote
A hard-working and honest police inspector with the Mumbai Police.

A. K. Bhattacharya
An intelligent and sophisticated Bengali fraudster who passes off wax copies of stone statues as genuine antiquities. On the outward journey to Calcutta, Bhattacharya uses the name "Bannerjee."

Redmond "Red" Travers
An arrogant and sometimes aggressive young British backpacker travelling with Mary Jane. He opposes any form of bureaucracy, including visas (which he has destroyed) and railway tickets. Although he seems to be an Antagonist towards Inspector Ghote, the Inspector suspects him to be an accomplice of A. K Banarjee. But in the end, we don't find Red to be any fraudster.

Mary Jane ("Little Cloud")
A charming and sincere American girl travelling with Red.

Mr. Ramaswami
A hard-working railway inspector visits each station to check that stationery and forms are only used for official purposes.

A. K. Biswas
A Bengali gambler who is wanted for gambling offences in Mumbai.

Mrs. Chiplanka
An elderly woman who was a political activist working for Mahatma Gandhi when the British ruled India.

== Major themes ==
In the first half of the novel, the main theme is suspense and doubt as Ghote alternately becomes increasingly certain and uncertain about A. K. Bannerjee's real identity. In the second half, the novel focuses on the difference between laws and morality as Ghote and Bhattacharya argue about the morality of the latter's crimes as opposed to their legality.

== Allusions/references to other works ==
On the journey to Calcutta, Inspector Ghote reads The D.A. Breaks An Egg by Earl Stanley Gardner (pub. William Morrow, 1949, USA). The D.A. Breaks An Egg is the ninth and last book in the Doug Selby series of novels. The D. A. Breaks An Egg may be featured in Inspector Ghote Goes By Train because the preceding novel in the Inspector Ghote series was entitled Inspector Ghote Breaks An Egg.

Keating also refers to Gardner's more successful Perry Mason series.

The character, Red, has read and been inspired by Rudyard Kipling's novel Kim.

== Literary significance & criticism ==
Amazon.co.uk quotes the following review for the 1989 edition of Inspector Ghote Goes By Train.

Gentle Ganesh Ghote, so mild you might underestimate his tenaciousness, takes a long trip from his native Bombay to Calcutta and back to apprehend a "confidence-trickster" presumably in jail in Calcutta, actually - he suspects - facing him in his railway compartment. His adversary goads him, drugs him, and eludes him even in these confined quarters, and there's a clattering chase at the close. A very delicate diddle which quite sneaks up on you.

— Kirkus Reviews

An independent video review was posted on "YouTube.com" on 17 August 2008 by the user "Crashsolo" as part of the "One Minute Critic" series of reviews. The review is mainly positive, with the reservation that the story is sometimes "slow."

== Allusions/references to actual history, geography and current science ==
The novel is set on the Indian railway system, with brief scenes in Mumbai and Calcutta.

== Release details ==
- 1971, USA, Doubleday & Company Inc., ASIN: B000OL0VKE, 1 January 1971, Hardcover
- 1971, UK, Collins, ISBN 0-00-231351-0, ISBN 978-0-00-231351-3, 15 November 1971, Paperback
- 1976, UK, Penguin Books Limited, ISBN 0-14-003972-4 / 978-0-14-003972-6, 25 March 1976, Paperback
- 1989, UK, Arrow Books Limited, ISBN 0-09-960350-0 / 978-0-09-960350-4, 16 November 1989, Paperback
- 2002, UK, Chivers Audio Books, ISBN 0-7540-0799-5 / 978-0-7540-0799-9, March 2002, Audio Cassette
- 2005, USA, Thorndike Press, ISBN 0-7862-7609-6 / 978-0-7862-7609-7, September 2005, Hardback
