= Inspector Ghote's Good Crusade =

1966 novel by H. R. F. Keating

- Front cover art for Inspector Ghote's Good Crusade
- Author: H. R. F. Keating
- Cover artist: Unknown
- Language: English
- Series: Inspector Ghote
- Genre: Crime
- Publisher: Collins
- Publication date: June 1966
- Publication place: United Kingdom
- Media type: Print (Hardback)
- Pages: 223 (Hardback 1st edition)
- ISBN: 978-9997518170
- Preceded by: The Perfect Murder
- Followed by: Inspector Ghote Caught in the Meshes

Inspector Ghote's Good Crusade is a crime novel by H. R. F. Keating. It is the second book in the Inspector Ghote series.

== Plot introduction ==
Inspector Ghote is tasked with investigating the murder of an American philanthropist and millionaire, Frank Masters. Frank Masters was renowned and respected throughout India because he had dedicated himself to improving the lot of homeless orphan children in Bombay. The mystery seeks to solve who poisoned him with arsenic.

=== Explanation of the novel's title ===
The novel's title refers to Inspector Ghote's determination to catch the killer, motivated partly by his admiration for the victim's acts of charity, which becomes his crusade.

== Plot summary ==
The novel begins just after Inspector Ghote has been given the task of investigating Frank Master's murder. At the Masters Foundation for the Care of Juvenile Vagrants Ghote meets two urchins who answer to names which they have chosen for themselves from American movies: "Edward G. Robinson" and "Tarzan". Inside, Ghote meats Dr Diana Uplea, who tells him that death was the result of arsenic poisoning. The cook tells him that Frank Masters ate the same food as the orphans, which was of poor quality except for a beef curry prepared under Doctor Diana Uplea's supervision. Ghote asks to see the dishes the meal was served in and the cook reveals that he is an unreliable witness by first claiming the dishes are washed then offering an "unwashed dish" which is actually a clean dish with leftovers from the dustbin added.

The interview ends when Fraulein Glucklick enters the room, interrupting Ghote. Glucklick informs Ghote that a Swami was giving a talk at the time of the murder. She also tells Ghote that Dr Diana Uplea caused no end of trouble when Masters visited Tibetan refugees in the Punjab and left Dr Uplea in charge. At this time Dr Upleigh discovered the notorious criminal Amahred Singh was hanging around the foundation and threatened him with the police. Lastly Fraulein Glucklick tells Ghote that the windows of the staff dining room are left open and on several occasions people have reached in to steal food (the implication is that someone could reach in to add poison).

The next day Ghote interviews Sonny Carstairs, an Anglo-Indian dispensing chemist at the foundation. Carstairs notes that the preparation used to treat the skin disease of "Edward G. Robinson" contains arsenic. On investigation the preparation bottle is lighter than it should be. Ghote tries to take the bottle as evidence but Carstairs drops it. Under threat of arrest for destroying evidence Carstairs tells Ghote that he dropped the bottle out of shock, having realised that the only key for the dispensary is in his charge.

After the interview Ghote encounters Dr Uplea who tells him Carstairs is not normally so clumsy and confirms there is only one key to the dispensary. Dr Uplea also reveals that she had "Edward G." and "Tarzan" watch on the dispensary as her car was nearby and had been recently vandalised.

Ghote interrogates "Edward G." by playing along with the boy's obsession with movies. The boy tells him that he saw a man enter the dispensary with a key. Using a ride in a police wagon as a bribe, Ghote discovers that the man was Amahred Singh, who has a gold smuggling racket which the boys help with. Masters apparently found some of the gold and locked it in the dispensary. "Edward G." promises to arrange a meeting between the inspector and Singh.

Ghote calls the fingerprint department and learns that Singh's fingerprints were found in the dispensary. A new interview of Sonny Carstairs, with intimidation, confirms that Carstairs gave Singh the key to dispensary because Singh threatened him. Later the same evening Chatterjee Krishna blackmailed Carstairs for the key with the knowledge that Carstairs used ether as a recreational drug.

Chatterjee admits borrowing the dispensary key but then flees. Ghote gives chase and captures Chatterjee who admits entering the dispensary but denies killing Frank Masters. Ghote reluctantly accepts this.

"Edward G." keeps his promise: Singh arrives and begins to answer Ghote's questions in a good-natured way. He charmingly acknowledges that he is a criminal and that the police want to hang him. Ghote tries to obtain a confession that Singh entered the dispensary. Singh refuses to give an explanation of why he was in the dispensary and notes that even he is a little afraid of Doctor Diana Uplea.

The following day Ghote has an interview with the Deputy Superintendent of Police. Ghote is ordered to have Singh arrested, with false evidence if necessary, and to suppress evidence that implicates Chatterjee. The D. S. P. leaves Ghote with a warning not to be too clever.

Instead of following orders, Ghote interviews Dr Uplea again. Frank Masters' visit to the Punjab is mentioned. Masters himself is described as a man of action rather than an armchair charity worker and as a man who had his eyes wide open to the evils of the world and was prepared to oppose them where he could.

Threatened with arrest, "Edward G." offers to supply false evidence in return for a fee. Ghote is painfully aware that this would be acceptable to his superiors and is faced with a difficult dilemma when "Edward G." claims to have seen Singh take poison from the jar in the dispensary.

Ghote resists the temptation to accept the boy's offer immediately, and hopes to use the threat of eyewitness testimony to extract information from Amahred Singh. He searches for Singh in one of the more dangerous parts of Bombay where he is attacked by one of Singh's associates and knocked unconscious. Ghote awakes to find himself in Singh's hideout in the presence of Singh himself. Singh acknowledges that he is a gold smuggler and admits entering the dispensary looking for gold that Masters had discovered and confiscated from the boys. He claims he found no gold, denies taking the poison and reveals that he knows Chatterjee also entered the dispensary.

The next day Ghote visits Chatterjee and obtains the address of "Tarzan's" family. Ghote has deduced that the boy's family are a link in Singh's Gold smuggling pipeline as they are fishermen and have a boat. Ghote visits the family, posing as a social worker. After his visit he keeps them under surveillance but his search fails to find any gold when they return to shore.

Feeling defeated, Ghote has Chatterjee brought to the police station for interrogation. Chatterjee describes Frank Masters as at times overgenerous which caused trouble at the foundation. On such occasions Masters responded with further acts of generosity, but often failed to follow through with his good works.

The following evening Ghote has a row with his wife. It ends with Ghote revealing that he has saved 500 rupees for a refrigerator, which will cost over 1100 rupees. He agrees to buy the refrigerator tomorrow and borrow the outstanding amount.

The next day, after getting the money out of his savings account, Ghote again visits "Tarzan's" family and discovers Singh keeping watch on them. He accuses Singh of murdering Masters, Singh denies it and claims ignorance of where the poison was kept. Singh tries to bribe Ghote then berates Masters acts of charity as acts of vanity. Ghote resolves to give his refrigerator money to the fisher family and soon after does so.

Returning to the foundation Ghote again encounters "Edward G." who also mocks Masters charity as mere egotism. Ghote realises that he has heard variations of this opinion from several people and that it must be true. Doctor Diana Uplea is the only person who has contradicted this view of Frank Masters. Ghote finds Dr Uplea, who tells him that Masters was a bad administrator who would not accept advice and a poor judge of character who allowed himself to be fooled by Amahred Singh. Hearing this causes Ghote to regret giving his refrigerator money to the fisher family and he hurries away in hope of retrieving it.

At their home Ghote discovers that the stepmother spent every penny on funding the village's holy day fiesta. Despairing, Ghote chances upon Singh digging something up. Singh flees but Ghote chases and arrests him. Inspector Patel of Indian Customs and Excise meets Ghote at the Bombay railway station. Patel takes Singh into his own custody, noting that Ghote had no authority to arrest Singh for a smuggling offence.

Ghote tells his wife he has given his money to the poor. His wife, Protima, is furious. The argument ends when Ghote tells Protima that the family used the money to celebrate the village's holy day and they both begin laughing. Ghote recounts the important details of the case to his wife, who remarks that a person can become sick without poison. Ghote has a revelation and solves the case.

At the foundation Ghote finds Dr Uplea about to fire the cook which she claims she has the authority to do now Frank Masters is dead. Chatterjee tries to make peace but Carstairs agrees the cook is terrible and that Dr Uplea is in charge. Ghote announces he knows the identity of the murderer.

Dr Uplea invites Ghote to arrest Chatterjee but Ghote declines, explaining that neither Chatterjee nor Singh committed the crime. Ghote explains that "Edward G." told Chatterjee that Frank Masters had lost his money and was smuggling gold to support the foundation. Chatterjee believed this lie and tried to protect Masters' reputation, inadvertently implicating himself.

Ghote reveals that Frank Masters became sick because of an ordinary emetic which allowed Dr Uplea to access the dispensary legitimately and administer the poison instead of a cure. Dr Uplea confesses that this is the truth and that she killed Masters because he intended to abandon the foundation and give his money to Tibetan refugees instead.

After Dr Uplea has been taken away, Ghote finds himself alone with "Edward G." who reveals that the boys knew the truth all along. "Edward G." stresses that street children need to know what is going on around them, as it is a survival skill, and praises Ghote's cleverness in catching Dr Uplea. Ghote at first accepts this praise, telling the boy that the police are not always stupid, then concedes that at least some policemen have wives who cannot be tricked.

== Characters in "Inspector Ghote's Good Crusade" ==
Inspector Ganesh Ghote: A hard working and honest police inspector in Bombay CID, India.

Frank Masters: American millionaire and philanthropist, founder of the "Masters Foundation for the Care of Juvenile Vagrants" Dead at the start of the novel due to arsenic poisoning.

Dr Diana Uplea: White British doctor who was Frank Masters second in command at the foundation.

Fraulein Glucklick: Indian citizen and devotee of the Swami that Frank Masters brought back from the Punjab.

Sonny Carstairs: Anglo-Indian dispensing chemist who works at the foundation.

Chatterjee Krishna: Social worker at the foundation.

"Tarzan": Athletic street urchin who chose his name from the character in American movies and a friend of "Edward G. Robinson".

"Edward G. Robinson": Disfigured street urchin who chose his name from the actor in American movies and a friend of "Tarzan". Suffers from serious skin condition, the treatment for which is a preparation containing arsenic.

Amahred Singh: Charming and roguish Sikh the Bombay police badly want to put in prison, but who they have no incriminating evidence to convict on.

== Major themes ==
The novel's major theme is the contrast between great wealth and intense poverty and the role charity plays between them. A key point of the plot is what motivates people to embark on great acts of good, or "crusades".

== Literary significance and criticism ==
"The Inspector is a fine comic character" SUNDAY TIMES

"One of the more convincing characters in modern contemporary mystery fiction" NEW YORK TIMES BOOK REVIEW

Audiofilemagazine.com has a positive review of the BBC Audiobooks America 2002 edition of Inspector Ghote's Good Crusade, read by Sam Dastor, on its website.

== Allusions/references to actual history, geography and current science ==
The novel is set in Mumbai, India, in the 1960s. The plot concerns the murder of Frank Masters who was the victim of arsenic poisoning.

== Awards and nominations ==
Inspector Ghote's Good Crusade did not itself win any awards, although this novel is the immediate sequel to The Perfect Murder, which won a Crime Writers' Association Gold Dagger.

== Release details ==
- 1966, UK, Collins, ASIN B001NMRONA, January 1966, Hardback
- 1968, UK, Penguin Books Limited, ISBN 978-0-14-002876-8, 28 September 1968, Paperback
- 1986, UK, Constable, ISBN 978-0-09-466450-0, 27 January 1986, Hardback
- 1989, UK, Arrow Books Limited, ISBN 978-0-09-957970-0, 19 January 1989, Paperback
- 2003, UK, BBC Audio Books, ISBN 978-0-7540-8648-2, 3 November 2003, Hardback
