= Bribery, Corruption Also =

1999 novel by H. R. F. Keating

- Cover of "Bribery, Corruption Also", 1st edition, UK 1999.
- Author: H. R. F. Keating
- Language: English
- Series: Inspector Ghote
- Genre: Crime novel
- Publisher: MacMillan
- Publication date: 22 January 1999
- Publication place: United Kingdom
- Media type: Print (Hardback)
- Pages: 288 pp
- ISBN: 978-0-333-74568-7
- OCLC: 41272728
- Preceded by: Asking Questions
- Followed by: Breaking and Entering

Bribery, Corruption Also is a crime novel by H. R. F. Keating. It is the twenty-third novel in the Inspector Ghote series.

== Plot introduction ==
The twenty-third Inspector Ghote novel finds the detective out of his element. His wife, Protima, has inherited a crumbling mansion in her native Calcutta along with enough money for the couple to renovate the property and retire in luxury, but Ghote is unhappy. Calcutta is a long way from his native Mumbai and he finds it difficult to stop being a detective.

Protima is determined that they should live in the house and enjoy life in the beautiful city that she has not seen since she was a young woman, but the solicitor handling the will advises them to sell and claims he is unable to release any money from the estate to help with their expenses.

Ghote begins to suspect corruption when he learns of a planned housing development close to the mansion but soon his investigation places the couple in grave danger.

=== Explanation of the novel's title ===
The title comes from Inspector Ghote's musings towards the end of the novel, as he reflects that bribery and corruption will always be part of life, no matter how hard people try to suppress them.

== Plot summary ==
Inspector Ghote's wife Protima has inherited a fortune and a mansion in Calcutta. Ghote is not pleased because it means he must leave his native Mumbai and give up being a policeman. No sooner have they landed in Calcutta than they discover the house is crumbling and inhabited by hostile squatters. Also a housing development is planned in the wetlands behind the house, which has the only access to the proposed construction project.

The solicitor in charge of the administering the will, A. K. Dutt-Daster, advises them to sell promptly and return home, but Ghote suspects corruption.

As Ghote investigates he uncovers a web of corruption that leads inexorably higher and higher in Calcutta's social and political hierarchy. On the way he encounters the easily bribed solicitor's clerk, who is soon murdered for obtaining incriminating documents from Dutt-Daster's files, he is assaulted under The Great Banyan tree in the Indian Botanical Gardens, meets a crusading newspaper editor who chooses his crusades very carefully, a cynical and corrupt Police Inspector and a powerful businessman who doesn't believe corruption is a bad thing.

Powerful forces are aligned against the elderly couple and ultimately they cannot be overcome. Finally Ghote finds himself obliged to pay a handsome bribe simply so the couple can escape from Calcutta with their freedom and lives.

Corruption and bribery will always be a part of life no matter how much people fight against it, Ghote reflects on the way home, but that is not a valid reason to give in to such things.

== Characters in "Bribery, Corruption Also" ==
Inspector Ghote: A hard working and honest, if often beleaguered police detective from Mumbai, India.

Protima Ghote: Inspector Ghote's wife. A native of Calcutta, India who has lived in Mumbai for most of her life.

A. K. Dutt-Daster: A Calcutta solicitor whose ethics are quickly shown to be highly questionable.

== Major themes ==
The novel focuses on the ethics of corruption and bribery. The characters are frequently placed in situations where they must perform a moral balancing act between achieving worthy goals and using dishonest and immoral methods to accomplish them.

== Literary significance & criticism ==
"As good a story as Keating has ever written, and the conclusion is as apt as it is touching" Birmingham Post

"The Indianness of it all is conveyed with utmost skill." Evening Standard

== Allusions/references to actual history, geography and current science ==
The novel is set in Calcutta, India and features many of the city's tourist attractions such as the Indian Botanical Gardens, including The Great Banyan tree and the Kalighat Kali Temple.

== Release details ==
- 1999, United Kingdom, MacMillan, ISBN 0-333-74568-X / 978-0-333-74568-7, Pub date 22 January 1999, Hardback
- 1999, United Kingdom, Ulverscroft Large Print Books Ltd, ISBN 0-7089-4149-4 / 978-0-7089-4149-2, November 1999, Hardback
- 1999, United States, Isis Audio Books, ISBN 0-7531-0580-2 / 978-0-7531-0580-1, May 1999, Audio book
- 1999, United States, St Martin's Press, ISBN 0-312-20502-3 / 978-0-312-20502-7, August 1999, Hardback

== Reviews ==
- "Tangled Web, H. R. F. Keating, Page 2". Tangled Web. 1 April 2009. "'As good a story as Keating has ever written, and the conclusion is as apt as it is touching' Birmingham Post. 'The Indianness of it all is conveyed with utmost skill.' Evening Standard"
- Barnes & Noble (July 1990). "Barnes & Noble; Bribery, Corruption Also; Editorial Reviews". website. U.S.: Barnes & Noble. "Inspector Ghote, an officer of the Bombay Police, is not a happy man. His wife has inherited a beautiful house in Calcutta - and she is determined that they both move from his beloved Bombay to live a life of luxurious retirement there.. "When the couple travel to the noisy but vibrant city to view her legacy, they find their property in a terrible state of disrepair, a decaying ruin inhabited by squatters. Their lawyer, A.K. Dutt-Dastar, advises them to sell it immediately - but Ghote detects a whiff of corruption and is determined to get to the bottom of it.. "And before they know it, Ghote and his wife are putting themselves in grave danger."

== Sources, references, external links, quotations ==
- Bribery, Corruption Also at Fantastic Fiction.co.uk
- reviews for Bribery, Corruption Also at Barnes & Noble.com
- Amazon.co.uk with customer reviews and book details
