= Inspector Ghote Hunts the Peacock =

Book by H. R. F. Keating

Inspector Ghote Hunts The Peacock
- First edition
- Author: H. R. F. Keating
- Language: English
- Series: Inspector Ghote
- Genre: Detective/Mystery
- Publisher: E. P. Dutton
- Publication date: June 1968
- Publication place: United Kingdom
- Media type: Print (Hardback)
- Pages: 228 (Paperback edition)
- ISBN: 0-09-957960-X (hardcover 1st edition)
- OCLC: 154207780
- Preceded by: Inspector Ghote Caught in the Meshes
- Followed by: Inspector Ghote Plays a Joker

Inspector Ghote Hunts The Peacock is a detective/mystery novel by H. R. F. Keating

== Plot introduction ==
An injury to Inspector Ghote's commanding officer prevents him from attending an international police conference on drug smuggling that is to be held in London. Inspector Ghote is ordered to go to England, attend the conference, take notes and produce a presentation on behalf of his superior.

On arrival Inspector Ghote is met by his cousin who, with his wife, runs an Indian restaurant in London. He stays with them for the duration of the conference but quickly learns that they expect him to find their missing 17-year-old niece, Ranee, who is nicknamed "The Peacock" for her bright attitude and dress.

In between attending the conference Ghote investigates the girl's disappearance, has his high expectations of Great Britain dashed by a grey and grimy London and tries to acquire a gift to take home to his wife.

=== Explanation of the novel's title ===
The title refers to Inspector Ghote's search for the missing girl.

== Plot summary ==
Inspector Ghote is tasked by his Superintendent to attend the London police conference and present a prepared speech. On arrival at the airport, Ghote is met by his cousin, Vidur Datta, who runs with his wife a London restaurant. Their niece, 17-year-old Ranee – known as the "Peacock" for her brightness – has disappeared. The family suspects her boyfriend, 35-year-old pop music star Johnny Bull. Ghote interviews the Peacock's friends, who believe she has been murdered but don't know who did it.

Ghote pays a visit to Johnny, who claims to have not seen the Peacock since she disappeared and has taken up with another girl, Susan. Johnny, a self-confessed opium user, informs Ghote that the Peacock herself acquired drugs from a local public house known as the "Robin's Nest". There, Ghote extracts a confession from the owner of having supplied opium to Peacock. He learns of a protection racket being run by the Smith brothers and is surprised to find that the Peacock's uncle, Vidur Datta, is an opium user.

Later, Ghote manages to confront the Smith brothers at their home, only to find himself in immediate danger. He is rescued by a passing policeman, who warns him not to interfere with a Scotland Yard investigation into the brothers. Finding no help from the British police and believing he is at a dead end to his enquiries, Ghote decides to drop the case. Mrs Datta quickly changes his mind by making it an issue of professional pride.

Ghote keeps watch on the Smith home the following night and gains access while they are out. While talking to their mother, he learns they were in police custody during the Peacock's disappearance. Returning to the "Robin's Nest," Ghote accuses the owner of lying and attempting to steer him into harm's way. However, Ghote satisfies himself that the man could not have murdered the Peacock.

Ghote attempts to interview Johnny again, but fails to get past Susan. He learns that Johnny will be at a particular recording studio that afternoon. Returning to the conference, Ghote listens to a superb presentation and learns that his own presentation must follow it the next day. He begins to become nervous about addressing a crowd. At the recording studio, Ghote conceals himself and eavesdrops on Susan, realising that Johnny could not have kidnapped or murdered the Peacock.

Ghote is scolded by the Dattas for his lack of progress and develops a cold as a result of the British climate. He finds the conference has moved into a much larger and grander room for the conference's final day, when he will give his speech. Nervous and irritated by the tardiness of the conference's emcee, Ghote makes a botch of his presentation. Frustrated and angry at everything that has happened, he adds what he has learned about Johnny's opium habit and walks out.

That evening at his cousin's restaurant, Ghote realises he has solved the mystery of the Peacock's disappearance. Ghote accuses his cousin, Vidur Datta, of murdering the Peacock because she was blackmailing him with his secret opium habit. The body is concealed under the restaurant's rubbish. No sooner has Ghote forced Mr Datta to confess than the police arrive, eager to congratulate him on the information he supplied about Johnny. It is revealed that Johnny has confessed to smuggling drugs in the Indian harmonium he used for his latest songs.

== Characters in "Inspector Ghote Hunts The Peacock" ==
Inspector Ganesh Ghote: A hard working Indian Police Inspector who normally lives and works in Mumbai, India.

Johnny Bull: A fading pop music star who is now in his thirties, he is trying to change his look in the hope it will help him appeal to the younger generation. His new look includes an Indian aesthetic. He became addicted to opium on a trip to India, where he met Ranee.

Ranee "Peacock" Datta: A 17-year-old girl raised in both India and the United Kingdom. She is missing throughout the novel but her character is central to the plot. She is very western in her attitudes, described as being bright and confident with a love of new clothes and pop music, particularly Johnny Bull's.

Jack Smith: Eldest of the Smith brothers, a criminal trio who run a protection racket and who are possibly involved with drugs.

Pete Smith: Described as "not right in the head" by Ghote's informant, Pete keeps a dangerous dog and appears to be mentally disabled. He is, however, very strong.

Billy Smith: Youngest of the Smith brothers, Pete flirted with Ranee but failed to achieve a relationship.

Mrs Smith: Mother to the Smith brothers, who live at home with her. She appears to have a frank and open relationship with them concerning their criminal activities, of which she is happy to accept the benefits.

Sandra: Johnny Bull's new girlfriend and a white British girl the same age as Ranee. Hostile to Ghote's investigation and protective of Johnny Bull, she is willing to bully Johnny when it comes to his career and drug habit.

Robin: Owner and bartender of the "Robin's Nest". Also a dealer in opium who supplies the Peacock and Vidur Datta.

== Major themes ==
Inspector Ghote deals with themes of culture clash, post-imperial relations between Britain and India, racism, crime, drugs and murder.

== Literary significance & criticism ==
This is the fourth in the Inspector Ghote series of novels. The series itself has won two Gold Daggers, awarded by the Crime Writers' Association.

== Allusions/references to actual history, geography and current science ==
This novel takes place in London, the capital city of the United Kingdom, and includes famous landmarks such as the Thames river, Tower Bridge and the Tower of London.

== Film, TV or theatrical adaptations ==
Inspector Ghote Hunts the Peacock was adapted for television as part of the BBC series Detective. It was broadcast on 12 October 1969 as the sixth episode in season three. Hugh Leonard dramatized the novel and it was directed by Ben Rea. The role of Inspector Ghote was played by Zia Mohyeddin. Vidur Datta was played by Marne Maitland. The name of Johnny Bull was changed to Johnny Britain and the role was played by Alan Tucker.

== Release details ==
- 1968, United Kingdom, E. P. Dutton, ISBN 0-09-957960-X, June 1968, Hardback
- 1969, United Kingdom, Penguin Books Ltd, ISBN 0-14-003020-4, 978-0-14-003020-4, September 1969, Paperback
- 1985, United Kingdom, Constable, ISBN 0-09-466320-3, 978-0-09-466320-6, April 1985, Hardback
- 1985, USA, Academy Chicago Publishers, ISBN 0-89733-179-6, 978-0-89733-179-1, November 1985, Paperback
- 1988, United Kingdom, Arrow Books Ltd, ISBN 0-09-957960-X, 978-0-09-957960-1, April 1988, Paperback
- 1991, USA, Curley Publishing, ISBN 0-7927-1135-1, 978-0-7927-1135-3, December 1991, Paperback
- 1992, USA, Curley Publishing, ISBN 0-7927-1136-X, 978-0-7927-1136-0, March 1992, Paperback
