= H. R. F. Keating =

English crime fiction writer

H. R. F. Keating FRSL
- Keating in 1981
- Born: Henry Reymond Fitzwalter Keating; 31 October 1926; St. Leonards-on-Sea, Sussex, England
- Died: 27 March 2011 (aged 84); London, England
- Resting place: Mortlake Crematorium
- Other names: Harry Keating; Evelyn Hervey
- Education: Trinity College Dublin
- Occupation: Writer
- Notable work: The Perfect Murder (1964)
- Spouse: Sheila Mitchell (m. 1953)
- Children: 4
- Website: hrfkeating.com

Henry Reymond Fitzwalter Keating (31 October 1926 – 27 March 2011) was an English crime fiction writer most notable for his series of novels featuring Inspector Ghote of the Bombay CID.

== Life ==
Keating, known as "Harry" to friends and family, was born in St. Leonards-on-Sea, Sussex and typed out his first story at the age of eight. He was educated at Merchant Taylor's School in London and later Trinity College Dublin. In 1956 he moved to London to work as a journalist on The Daily Telegraph. He was the crime books reviewer for The Times for 15 years. He was chairman of the Crime Writers' Association (CWA) (1970–71), chairman of the Society of Authors (1983–84) and president of the Detection Club (1985–2000). He was a fellow of the Royal Society of Literature.

He received the George N. Dove Award in 1995. In 1996 the CWA awarded him the Cartier Diamond Dagger for outstanding services to crime literature. He also wrote screenplays, was a reviewer and edited the essay collection Agatha Christie: First Lady of Crime. He died in London on 27 March 2011, aged 84.

== Last years ==
On his 80th birthday in 2006, members of the Detection Club honoured him with an anthology, Verdict of Us All, published by Crippen & Landru. He lived in London with his wife, the actress Sheila Mitchell, until his death in 2011, aged 84. He was survived by his wife, four children, and nine grandchildren.

== Works ==
=== Early novels ===
Keating's first four novels were published by Gollancz. With his fifth novel, Death of a Fat God (1963), he moved to Collins Crime Club, with whom he stayed for the next twenty years.

=== Inspector Ghote ===
Inspector Ganesh Ghote is an inspector in the Bombay (Mumbai) Police who appeared in twenty-six novels. The first was The Perfect Murder (1964), which won a Crime Writers' Association Gold Dagger Award and was nominated for an Edgar Award. It was later made into a film by Merchant Ivory. Keating intended Ghote's final appearance to be in the novel Breaking and Entering (2000), but brought the character back in Inspector Ghote's First Case (2008) and A Small Case for Inspector Ghote (2009).

Keating did not visit India until ten years after he started writing about it. In the introduction to Inspector Ghote, His Life and Crimes, Keating stated that he was contemplating setting his next detective novel in India because "American publishers had rejected my previous four titles as being 'too British.'" He did research (he later acknowledged, "from books, from the occasional Indian art-film featuring the city [Bombay], from scraps of friends' talk, from TV glimpses, and from the pages of the Sunday edition of the Times of India, which I had begun to take") and consulted with a friend that he described as "an Englishman just back from Bombay." He had intended the first book as a one-off, but The Perfect Murder "unexpectedly won the Golden Dagger award for 1964, and an Edgar Allan Poe award in America where, yes, it did get published." As Keating describes in the introduction to Inspector Ghote, His Life and Crimes: "...one morning, sometime in 1974, I got a letter from Air India saying they had heard of this author writing about Bombay without ever having seen the sub-continent, so would I like a flight there in exchange for whatever publicity there was to be made?" He accepted and landed in Bombay on 12 October 1974, spending three weeks there.

=== Evelyn Hervey ===
In the mid-1980s Keating published three novels with Weidenfeld under the pseudonym Evelyn Hervey.

=== DCI Harriet Martens ===
Harriet Martens is a detective chief inspector who earns the nickname "The Hard Detective" because of the tough image that she adopts to survive in the masculine world of UK policing. This toughness inspired her to start a "Stop the Rot" campaign that successfully reduced local crime but angered some violent criminals to the extent that they started murdering her officers. In the second book, she falls in love with a fellow officer while investigating the murder of the UK's top tennis player. With her job under threat, she fights to prove her worth in the third book.

=== Other novels ===
In 1978 Keating published A Long Walk to Wimbledon, a science-fiction novel about a man trekking across a ruined London to save his estranged wife.

In the 1990s Keating wrote several novels about UK police detectives whose human weaknesses adversely affect their work. The first of these was The Rich Detective (1993) in which Detective Inspector Bill Sylvester of South Mercia Police investigates an anonymous allegation that a local antiques dealer is murdering old ladies after persuading them to change their wills in his favour.

In The Bad Detective (1996) Detective Sergeant Jack Stallworthy is a corrupt police officer who is planning his retirement to Devon when a businessman offers him ownership of a hotel on a tropical island in return for stealing an incriminating file from the Fraud Investigations Office at police headquarters.

In September 1999 Flambard Press published his verse novel Jack, the Lady Killer.

=== Non-fiction ===
His guide to Writing Crime Fiction (1986) was based on his analysis of the development of the genre from the 1920s to the 1990s. It includes guidance on fictional structure, the plot and its characters, and on submitting a script to publishers.

== Bibliography ==
Partial bibliography

=== Inspector Ghote ===
- The Perfect Murder (1964)
- Inspector Ghote's Good Crusade (1966)
- Inspector Ghote Caught in Meshes (1967)
- Inspector Ghote Hunts the Peacock (1968)
- Inspector Ghote Plays a Joker (1969)
- Inspector Ghote Breaks an Egg (1970)
- Inspector Ghote Goes by Train (1971)
- Inspector Ghote Trusts the Heart (1972)
- Bats Fly Up for Inspector Ghote (1974)
- Filmi, Filmi, Inspector Ghote (1976)
- Inspector Ghote Draws a Line (1979)
- The Murder of the Maharajah (1980) (Not technically an Inspector Ghote book—it takes place in April 1930 and District Superintendent of Police Howard is the detective—however, Ghote is present in spirit.)
- Go West Inspector Ghote (1981)
- The Sheriff of Bombay (1984)
- Under a Monsoon Cloud (1986)
- The Body in the Billiard Room (1987)
- Dead on Time (1988)
- The Iciest Sin (1990)
- Inspector Ghote, His Life and Crimes (1989); short story collection
- Cheating Death (1992)
- Doing Wrong (1993)
- Asking Questions (1996)
- Bribery, Corruption Also (1999)
- Breaking and Entering (2000)
- Inspector Ghote's First Case (2008)
- A Small Case for Inspector Ghote? (2009)

=== Harriet Martens ===
- The Hard Detective (2000)
- Detective in Love (2001)
- A Detective Under Fire (2002)
- The Dreaming Detective (2003)
- A Detective at Death's Door (2004)
- One Man and His Bomb (2006)
- Rules, Regs and Rotten Eggs (2007)

=== Other novels ===
- Death and the Visiting Firemen (1959)
- Zen There Was Murder (1960)
- A Rush on the Ultimate (1961)
- The Dog It Was That Died (1962)
- Death of a Fat God (1963)
- Is Skin-Deep, Is Fatal (1965)
- Deadlier Than the Male (1967); writing as Henry Reymond; novelisation of Deadlier Than the Male (a Bulldog Drummond thriller, screenplay by Jimmy Sangster)
- Some Girls Do (1969); writing as Henry Reymond; novelisation of Some Girls Do (a Bulldog Drummond thriller, screenplay by Jimmy Sangster)
- The Strong Man (1971)
- The Underside (1974)
- A Remarkable Case of Burglary (1975)
- Murder by Death (1976); novelisation of Murder by Death (screenplay by Neil Simon)
- A Long Walk to Wimbledon (1978); science-fiction novel
- The Governess (1983); writing as Evelyn Hervey
- Mrs. Craggs: Crimes Cleaned Up (1985); short story collection
- The Man of Gold (1985); writing as Evelyn Hervey
- Into the Valley of Death (1986); writing as Evelyn Hervey
- The Rich Detective (1993)
- The Good Detective (1995)
- The Bad Detective (1996)
- The Soft Detective (1997)
- In Kensington Gardens Once... (Crippen & Landru, 1997); short story collection
- Jack the Lady Killer (1999); novel in verse
- A Kind of Light (2017); posthumous printing of an unpublished novel dating from 1987 discovered after the author's death.

=== Short stories ===
- "A Toothbrush" (2005), published in The Detection Collection, edited by Simon Brett.

=== Non-fiction books ===
- Murder Must Appetize (1975)
- Agatha Christie: First Lady of Crime (1977), editor
- Sherlock Holmes, the Man and His World (1979)
- Great Crimes (1982)
- Writing Crime Fiction (1986; 2nd ed. 1994)
- Crime and Mystery: the 100 Best Books (1987)
- The Bedside Companion to Crime (1989)
