= Inspector Ghote's First Case =

2008 novel by H. R. F. Keating

- First edition cover
- Author: H. R. F. Keating
- Language: English
- Series: Inspector Ghote
- Genre: Crime-detective novel
- Publisher: Allison & Busby
- Publication date: 26 May 2008
- Publication place: United Kingdom
- Media type: Print (hardback)
- Pages: 288 pp
- ISBN: 978-0-7490-7970-3
- OCLC: 212431496
- Preceded by: Breaking and Entering (novel)
- Followed by: A Small Case for Inspector Ghote?

Inspector Ghote's First Case is a crime novel by H. R. F. Keating.

== Plot introduction ==
Inspector Ghote has just been promoted to inspector and is on leave before taking up his post in Bombay Criminal Investigation Department. This he hopes will allow him to spend time with his heavily pregnant wife, Protima. Sir Rustom Engineer, the retired Police Commissioner of Bombay, asks Inspector Ghote to investigate the motiveless apparent suicide of Mrs Iris Dawkins, whose husband was an old friend of Sir Rustom's before Indian independence.

The case has already been investigated by Inspector Darrani, an old rival of Ghote's from police training college, but Inspector Ghote soon learns that the tragedy is not what it first seems to be.

== Plot summary ==
It is the early 1960s and Inspector Ghote is on leave from the Bombay police before taking up a post in crime branch. His wife, Protima, is heavily pregnant with their first child. The former police commissioner, now retired, Sir Rustom Engineer, requests that as a favour Ghote investigate the motiveless suicide of Iris Dawkins. Robert Dawkins is an old friend of Sir Rustom's from before Indian independence and has written a letter asking for help.

Ghote arrives at the remote town where the tragedy occurred and finds that Iris Dawkins apparently committed suicide by shooting herself in the head with a shotgun without leaving a note. Afterwards the Dawkinses' man servant telephoned Mr Dawkins at the nearby golf club and asked him to return home as there had been a "nasty accident".

At the local police station, Ghote finds a rival from police training college, Inspector Darrani, has already investigated the case and has a closed mind on the subject.

From an old letter, Ghote gets the name of an old friend of Mrs Dawkins: Pansy, who married a Forest Officer named Peter Watson. Forest Officers move from one place to another every few months, however, and Ghote has to use his initiative to find her.

Shinto, the young boy who takes care of the Dawkinses' garden, tells Ghote that a young man apparently visited Mrs Dawkins on the morning of her suicide. From the same boy, Ghote learns that the gun was in the wrong position for a left-handed person to have committed suicide with.

From Pansy Watson, Ghote learns that Iris Dawkins was the daughter of Sir Ronald and Lady Mountford. Sir Ronald was an ICS advisor to a Maharaja before independence. Her parents were killed by a rampaging elephant while touring a remote area when Iris was a child. Iris stayed in India with the family of the British Resident until roughly the age of twelve or thirteen, when she was seduced by the son of a Maharaja (who was the same age) and became pregnant. She was then sent to stay with the nuns at St Agnes Convent in Poona until her child was delivered and then the child, a boy, was sent to the raja's palace. Iris Dawkins was then sent home to England, where she was cared for by poor relations of her own family and adopted their name, Petersham.

When she came of age, Iris Petersham found a job in London and saved up until she could return to India after independence. She then came to stay with the Watsons until she met Robert Dawkins, who was a friend of Peter Watson, and married him.

Ghote learns that Iris Dawkins was left-handed and that her left eye had a green fleck from a picture taken by a local photographer. That she was left-handed is relevant to the position of the shotgun she supposedly committed suicide with. That her eyes, described by her husband as "violet", were in fact blue with a fleck of green, shows Ghote that her husband, Robert Dawkins, held many cherished illusions about his wife.

When Ghote reports his findings to Mr Dawkins, Inspector Darrani intervenes and persuades Mr Dawkins to put the matter behind him. Afterwards, Ghote resolves to ask Inspector Darrani about the young man who was seen visiting Mrs Dawkins on the morning of her death. Ghote also realises, belatedly, that the phrase "a nasty accident" was specifically used in the telephone message that alerted Mr Dawkins to his wife's death and that such a phrase is more typical of a man like Mr Dawkins than the manservant who would have made the call.

Investigating at the golf club, Ghote learns that at the relevant time of day the club is nearly empty and that Mr Dawkins may have been the only person present. His alibi is therefore unsound.

Interviewing Shinto the gardener boy at the boy's home, he learns that the Dawkinses' manservant has threatened the boy to make him keep silent. Ghote decides to return to the Dawkins residence and interview the manservant about the morning of Mrs Dawkins' death.

After interviewing the manservant, Ghote realises that the man must be blackmailing his employer, Robert Dawkins, and re-assesses what he knows about Mr Dawkin's character.

Carefully considering the case, Ghote comes to the conclusion that the young man who visited Mrs Dawkins was in fact her long-lost son whom she would have immediately recognised from the green flecks in one eye, a genetic trait inherited from her. Robert Dawkins returned home from the club unexpectedly having forgotten his spectacles and found them embracing. Misunderstanding the situation, Robert Dawkins fetched the shotgun from his gun cabinet and killed Iris Dawkins, her son having already escaped at her urging.

The Dawkinses' manservant then moved the body out of the room where the crime had taken place into the living room, while Dawkins himself returned to the club. The club being nearly deserted at that hour, no one had noticed his absence and it was there that the message, phrased using words he had given to the manservant, was delivered to him.

Before Ghote can act on his conclusions, an urgent message comes for him telling him his wife, Protima, is about to give premature birth. Ghote hurries back to his wife only to discover the message is a hoax by his wife, who has been missing him. Ghote forgives his wife and after an hour, returns to the scene of the crime.

Ghote conducts another search of the Dawkins home and re-enacts the crime in an effort to prove his theory. He challenges the manservant with the knowledge that Iris Dawkins was killed in the sewing room, not the living room. The manservant confirms this and explains he was looking for a fragment of a letter written by the Maharaja to Iris Dawkins, which her son had dropped before fleeing the scene. The manservant also confirms that Inspector Darrani had quickly discovered that Iris Dawkins's long-lost son had visited her. The young man is now the surviving heir to the Maharaja, who has been searching for him. In hope of securing a large reward from the Maharaja, Inspector Darrani has concealed the young man's whereabouts and attempted close the books on Mrs Dawkins death quickly, with the minimum of investigation.

Ghote telephones Inspector Darrani and forces him to come to the house to arrest the manservant as an accessory after the fact. Robert Dawkins overhears Inspector Ghote put his case to Inspector Darrani and, after fetching the shotgun, commits suicide in the room where his wife died.

== Characters ==
Inspector Ganesh Ghote: A hard-working policeman, recently promoted to the rank of Inspector. He is married to Protima Ghote, who is expecting their first child and lives in Bombay, India.

Protima Ghote: Ganesh Ghote's wife of less than a year at the start of the novel. She is heavily pregnant with the couple's first child. She is also a university graduate of English Literature. She is particularly fond of the works of Shakespeare and wants badly to see a film of Hamlet that is being shown in Bombay.

Robert Dawkins: A British civil servant who remained in India after independence and his own retirement, believing he would have a better quality of life. He is an old friend of Sir Rustum Engineer and Peter Watson, through whom he met future wife Iris Petersham.

Iris Dawkins: Born Iris Mountford, daughter of Sir and Lady Mountford, then orphaned at an early age. While staying with the British Resident in India, she was seduced by the son of the Maharaja, who was the same age as she, and gave birth to a son who was put up for adoption. She was later returned to the United Kingdom and adopted by the Petershams, who were poor relations to her own family. When she returned to India she met and married Robert Dawkins.

Sir Rustom Engineer: Retired Police Commissioner of Bombay Police. A friend of Robert Dawkins from the days before Indian independence. Sir Rustom responds to a letter from Robert Dawkins asking for help by sending Inspector Ghote to investigate the death of Iris Dawkins unofficially.

Inspector "Bully Boy" Darrani: A rival of Inspector Ghote's from police training college. Darrani is a very forceful individual who seems to have a closed mind on nearly any topic once he has expressed an opinion on it. Darrani graduated at the top of his class from police training college by blackmailing Ghote into underperforming in the final exams, with the knowledge that Ghote had been disgraced and sent back from a police youth conference held in Moscow after Ghote enabled a smuggler to bring Levis jeans (which were forbidden in the Soviet Union) into the country.

== Major themes ==
Inspector Ghote's First Case deals with the suicide and its aftermath, but also with murder and fears related to pregnancy. The attitude of the British in India after independence and of the Indians towards the British is also closely examined. To a lesser extent, the British attitude to scandal and unmarried childbirth is also a feature of the story.

To a lesser extent, Ghote's characteristic inability to make a decision is paralleled by Hamlet, which is referred to several times in the novel.

The novel also deals with the cherished illusions people hold and how they react when these illusions are threatened. A key plot point of the novel is that Robert Dawkins chooses to see the world as he would like it to be, rather than the way it actually is. This even extends to his wife, whose blue and green eyes he describes as violet, and whose character and history is very different from what he imagines.

== Allusions and references to other works ==
Shakespeare's play Hamlet is referred to several times in the course of the novel and other plays by Shakespeare are also quoted, including Othello.

== Literary significance and criticism ==
The Times newspaper's book review has an article entitled "Times Summer Books: Mysteries" written by Alexander McCall Smith. The article mentions the release of Inspector Ghote's First Case, but refers rather to the entire Inspector Ghote series instead of this specific novel. Smith refers to H. R. F. Keating's work as the crime novel reviewer for The Times and calls the series: "exquisite, gentle novels that should find their place on any list of good crime fiction."

Allison & Busby, the novel's publisher, quotes favourable reviews from The Spectator, The Sunday Telegraph, The News of the World, Literary Review, Shots and the Birmingham Post on its website.

Mike Ripley's Crime File for May 2008 includes a review of the novel which refers to "…Keating's great skill as a writer, portraying [Ghote] with a graceful lightness of touch and great affection."

== Allusions and references to actual history, geography and current science ==
The novel refers to the independence of India from the British Empire and takes place in the Mumbai (then known as Bombay) area of India. Part of the novel also takes place in Poona.

As a crime novel, the story heavily features the methods of criminal investigation used by the Indian police in the 1960s.

== Awards and nominations ==
The Crime Writers' Association named Inspector Ghote's First Case as one of several novels that failed to make the shortlist for the 2008 Ellis Peters Historical Crime Award.

This is the twenty-third in the Inspector Ghote series of novels. The series itself has won two Gold Daggers, awarded by the Crime Writers' Association.

== Release details ==
- 2008, United Kingdom, Allison & Busby, ISBN 0-7490-7970-3 / 978-0-7490-7970-3, 26 May 2008, hardback.
- 2009, United Kingdom, St Martin's Minotaur, ISBN 0-312-38404-1 / 978-0-312-38404-3, August 2009, hardback.
