= The Perfect Murder (1988 film) =

- Directed by: Zafar Hai
- Written by: HRF Keating
- Based on: The Perfect Murder by HRF Keating
- Produced by: Ismail Merchant
- Starring: Stellan Skarsgård; Naseeruddin Shah; Ratna Pathak; Madhur Jaffrey; Amjad Khan
- Cinematography: Walter Lassally
- Music by: Richard Robbins
- Release date: 1 July 1988 (United Kingdom)
- Running time: 90 minutes
- Countries: United Kingdom; India
- Languages: English; Hindi
- Budget: $500,000

The Perfect Murder is a 1988 English-language Indian detective film directed by Zafar Hai and produced by Merchant-Ivory. The film is based on the 1964 novel The Perfect Murder by British crime fiction writer HRF Keating and stars Naseeruddin Shah as Inspector Ghote, the leading character in Keating's novels. Swedish actor Stellan Skarsgård as well as many noted Indian actors such as Madhur Jaffrey, Amjad Khan, Dalip Tahil, Ratna Pathak, Annu Kapoor and Johnny Walker appear in the film.

== Plot ==
Police Inspector Ghote lives a middle-class life in Bombay along with his wife, Pratima. He has been employed with the Bombay Police for many years. His wife is generally disgruntled and wants a better life. He is assigned to investigate the deadly assault on a Parsi man named Perfect, who is the secretary of Lala Heera Lal, a wealthy man with underworld links. Inspector Ghote commences his investigation and is displeased when his superiors ask him to work with a Swedish forensic expert, Axel Svennson. Axel is thrilled to get a closer look at the working of the Bombay Police but realizes that Ghote may not be one of their best police officers. When their friendship develops, he gets invited to Ghote's house and meets Pratima. Their investigation, though primafacie simple enough, takes them through turns and twists that both had not expected – including corridors of power and corruption – and finally to the conclusion and the unmasking of the culprit(s) behind this incident.

== Cast ==
- Naseeruddin Shah as Inspector Ganesh Ghote
- Stellan Skarsgård as Axel Svensson
- Amjad Khan as Lala Heera Lal
- Madhur Jaffrey as Mrs. Lal
- Annu Kapoor as Tiny Man
- Archana Puran Singh as Miss Twinkle
- Dalip Tahil as Dilip Lal
- Sakina Jaffrey as Nina Lal
- Dinshaw Daji as Mr. Perfect
- Johnny Walker as Jain
- Mohan Agashe as A.C.P. Samant
- Rajesh Vivek as Zero Police
- Ratna Pathak as Pratima Ghote (as Ratna Pathak Shah)
- Salim Ghouse as Caste-Marks Goonda
- Sameer Kakkad as Felix Sousa
- Vinod Nagpal as Minister
- Gopi Krishna as Dance Master
- Pearl Padamsee as Nurse
- Lilliput as Short Man-Goonda
- Imaad Shah as Ved Ghote (The little child)

== Reception ==
DVD Talk said, "It's all very cute, but as with much of the humor in The Perfect Murder, we're never sure we're fully understanding the joke."
