= Andorinha (disambiguation) =

Andorinha is a municipality in the state of Bahia, Brazil.

Andorinha may also refer to:

- CF Andorinha, a football club in Funchal, Madeira Islands
- Andorinha Sport Club, a football club in São Tomé and Príncipe
