= Asking Questions =

1996 novel by H. R. F. Keating

- Front cover art for Asking Questions, first edition, 1996
- Author: H. R. F. Keating
- Cover artist: Rai Raghu, Magnum
- Language: English
- Series: Inspector Ghote
- Genre: Crime
- Publisher: Macmillan UK Ltd.
- Publication date: 1 January 1996
- Publication place: United Kingdom
- Media type: Print (Hardback)
- Pages: 282 (Hardback edition)
- ISBN: 0-333-66271-7
- Preceded by: Doing Wrong
- Followed by: Bribery, Corruption Also

Asking Questions is a crime novel by H. R. F. Keating. It is the twentieth novel in the Inspector Ghote series and the twenty-second book, due to the publication of two short story collections.

== Plot introduction ==
Inspector Ghote is ordered to investigate a case of drug smuggling at the Mira Behn Institute for Medical Research. Ghote's chief suspect is Chandra Chagoo, the snake handler, but unfortunately Chagoo himself is dead, the victim of a deadly Russell's viper. Inspector Ghote knows this was no accident, but the only way he will get answers is through asking a lot of awkward questions.

== Plot summary ==
The novel is prefaced by a section entitled "Questions", which consists of four passages numbered in Roman numerals.

I

Chandra Chagoo is threatened by Abdul Khan, who believes Chagoo has been asking questions in order to gather evidence for the police.

II

Dr Gauri Subbiah contemplates confronting Chagoo and demanding exactly what he knows about her past. She fears he knows everything.

III

Dr Ram Mahipal lectures a class of medical students about the importance of asking questions. Privately he contemplates imminent professional ruin for asking the wrong question.

IV

Professor Phaterpaker also contemplates professional ruin as a result of Ram Mahipal's question, the answer to which Chagoo already knows.

The preface ends.

The main body of the novel begins with the heading:

Answer

The Commissioner tells Ghote that a criminal named Abdul Khan has supplied Bombay film stars with drugs from the Mira Behn Institute. Ghote is ordered to find who stole drugs from the institute and arrest them under a false charge to prevent a scandal. Ghote tells the Commissioner that he recently caught an airline stewardess, Nicky D'Costa, smuggling drugs for Abdul Khan. The Commissioner says he will assign another officer to manage Nicky D'Costa as an informant and that it will take a better officer than Ghote to bring Abdul Khan to justice.

Ghote questions Asha Rani, a movie star. Her "friend" Mr Ganguly took a sample of a medicine called A.C.E. and nearly died. Khan, who also supplied Mr Ganguly with cocaine, supplied the A.C.E.

At the institute, Ghote interviews Professor Phaterpaker. The Professor says he will go to any lengths to protect the institute. The institution's work is largely concerned with making new medicines from the venom of poisonous snakes.

Dr Subbiah immediately suspects Chandra Chagoo of having stolen the A.C.E. and leads Ghote to the reptile room. When the door is unlocked they find Chagoo dead with a Russell's viper loose in the room.

The next day the Commissioner assigns Ghote to investigate Chagoo's death to prevent the scandal being exposed by another officer. Ghote realises that Chagoo did not have a key to lock the reptile room door and must have been murdered.

Ghote interviews Dr Ram Mahipal, who left a reptile-room key in his old office at the institute when he suddenly quit his job. Ghote learns from the building manager that Mahipal returned in order to access his computer files on the night Chagoo died. Dr Subbiah, Professor Phaterpaker, Dr Mahipal and the building manager were all in the building at the time.

Ghote suspects that the murderer may be an employee at the nearby hospital. He enlists the inspector originally assigned to Chagoo's death to test this theory.

On their next meeting Mahipal says he returned to teaching in hopes of instilling integrity in young medical students. Mahipal left the institute because he believed that Phaterpaker faked results, possibly on a regular basis.

Phaterpaker takes the news that Chagoo was murdered calmly, remarking that Mahipal was slipshod and implying that he was dismissed for this. Ghote tries to determine exactly why Mahipal left, but Phaterpaker is vague. When Phaterpaker realises he himself is a suspect, he is affronted but admits "cutting corners" and acts like a man with something to hide. Ghote concludes that Phaterpaker is trying to use Mahipal as a scapegoat to protect the institute.

Dr Subbiah reacts badly when asked about her relations with Chagoo, however Ghote concludes she is not the killer.

Ghote discovers that Dr Mahipal's father works as a cook at the medical school and is a Brahmin, whereas Mahipal claims to be a member of the Dalit caste. Ghote deduces that Mahipal misrepresented himself in order to get a university scholarship reserved for the lower classes. Mahipal confesses this is so. Ghote suggests Chagoo came to learn Mahipal's secret and was murdered because of this. Mahipal denies this and reveals that he left the institute because Phaterpaker was removing lab animals that gave undesirable results.

At the police station, Ghote is dismayed when the inspector he is working with points out one of the three scientists must surely hang for the crime and expresses a preference that it be Dr Subbiah.

At the institute Ghote accuses Phaterpaker of falsifying test results. Phaterpaker confesses his results are fake. He became aware that Chagoo was stealing drugs from the institute but was forced to agree to a truce because Chagoo knew Phaterpaker was removing lab animals. Ghote considers the reptile room and realises wooden stool must have been used to break the glass, so he decides to have it dusted for fingerprints.

At the police station Ghote learns that Nicky D'Costa has murdered, her throat slit after asking too many questions of Abdul Khan. Ghote is angry enough to confront the commissioner, but learns Khan had arranged to be in hospital during the murder.

The forensic tests do not find a match between any fingerprints on the stool and Ghote's three suspects. Nor can they prove it was used to break the glass of the viper's cage.

Ghote goes home and argues with his wife, then inspiration strikes and he returns to the institute. There he searches the grounds for evidence someone could gain access by night. The security guard catches Ghote and he must call his fellow inspector to rescue him. Afterwards Ghote chances upon Dr Subbiah. Ghote deduces that Phaterpaker persuaded her to "anticipate" the results of her experiments, as Phaterpaker himself was once persuaded.

The conversation between Ghote and Subbiah is interrupted when, by chance, they pass the funeral of Nicky D'Costa. Ghote tells Subbiah how Nicky D'Costa was murdered and proceeds to question her about her test results. Subbiah remarks that Abdul Khan was a patient at the teaching hospital recently. Ghote asks whether she anticipated her results before completing the actual experiment. She admits faking her results.

Ghote now believes that Subbiah is the murderer. He accuses her and she reacts in amazement, saying that Chagoo was clearly strangled. Ghote realises that he only saw the body laying face down, and the inspector originally assigned to the case never forwarded the medical examiner's report. Ghote realises that Chagoo could not have been strangled by Subbiah or Phaterpaker because neither of them have the necessary strength. Dr Mahipal has a withered arm, eliminating him as a suspect.

Returning to the police station, Ghote talks to the forensic expert who examined the stool from the institute reptile room. The expert admits he only compared the fingerprints on the stool to the three suspects Ghote named; Subbiah, Phaterpaker and Mahipal. Without Khan's file in front of him, he could not identify the fingerprints. Khan's file is retrieved and his fingerprints are a perfect match.

Ghote realises he can arrest and charge Khan with murder and recalls, with satisfaction, the words used by Commissioner's at the start of the case: "Frankly, Inspector, it will take a better man than you to put paid to Abdul Khan".

== Characters in "Asking Questions" ==
Inspector Ganesh Ghote: A hard working and honest police inspector in the Crime Branch of Bombay police.

Abdul Khan: A criminal on Bombay police's most wanted list. Supplied cocaine smuggled from the United States of America and A.C.E. drug samples stolen from Mira Behn Institute to Bombay film stars. Known to have used airline stewardess Nicky D'Costa as a drugs mule and believed to have ordered her brutal murder when she became a police informant. Seen threatening and assaulting Chandra Chagoo at the start of the novel.

Chandra Chagoo: Snake handler for the Mira Behn Institute. Early in the novel Chagoo is found dead; his body was locked in the reptile room from the outside, apparently with Chagoo's own key. For much of the novel Ghote believes Ghote died from the bite of a Russell's Viper, deliberately released from its cage and locked in with Chagoo. In fact Chagoo was strangled. Chagoo was in charge of looking after the lab animals at the institute, and in this capacity discovers that Professor Phaterpaker is removing animals that do not support the test results that he desires. At the start of the novel Chagoo is threatened and assaulted by Abdul Khan.

Dr Gauri Subbiah: A female researcher at the Mira Behn institute. Brilliant but from a humble background and believed by Ghote to be extremely honest. Subbiah eventually admits, in some distress, that she allowed Phaterpaker to persuade her to falsify results in her last experiments in order to publish a scientific paper ahead of an American team researching in the same area.

Dr Ram Mahipal: Teacher at the nearby medical school and teaching hospital. Mahipal has a withered arm. He was dedicated to his research but was forced to resign from the Mira Behn Institute under mysterious circumstances. He misrepresents himself as a member of the Dalit caste because he first attended university under a programme where university places are reserved for members of the lower classes. In fact he is a member of the Brahmin caste. His father works as a cook in at medical school where he works, which Ghote discovers.

Professor Phaterpaker: Director of the Mira Behn Institute. Admits that as a young man he was persuaded to "anticipate" the results of a medical experiment in order to lay first claim to a research breakthrough. In the twenty years since then Phaterpaker has increasingly relied on falsifying his results, at the institute he does this by removing lab animals that do not support the experimental result he is trying to obtain. Chandra Chagoo learned this and was able to use it to negotiate a truce when Phaterpaker discovered Chagoo's theft of drugs from the Mira Behn Institute.

== Major themes ==
The major theme of the novel is the nature, methods and consequences of enquiry, including police investigation and scientific method.

== Literary significance and criticism ==
Amazon.com quotes two favourable reviews, one from Kirkus Reviews that describes the book as an "archly amusing fable" and the other from Joanne Wilkinson of Booklist magazine.

Ghote is as endearing as ever in this satisfying, entertaining mystery that conveys the rarefied atmosphere of elite scientific research and offers a host of intriguing secondary characters.

— Joanne Wilkinson, Booklist magazine

Amazon.com also lists a customer review by "edwartel" [sic] that calls Asking Questions "a superior book".

Crime Time magazine reviewed the book, saying it was: "a fine addition to the canon".

== Allusions/references to actual history, geography and current science ==
The novel takes place in Mumbai, India.

The plot concerns an institute that researches medicines made from snake venom, a genuine area of scientific research, especially to produce antivenom.

Inspector Ghote believes the murder victim died from the bite of a Russell's Viper. In fact the victim was killed by manual strangulation

== Awards and nominations ==
Asking Questions was released in 1996, the year that H. R. F. Keating was awarded the Cartier Diamond Dagger for Outstanding Services to Crime Literature by the Crime Writers' Association of Great Britain. The British editions of the book often refer to the award on the front cover.

== Release details ==
- 1996, UK, Macmillan, ISBN 0-333-66271-7, 1 January 1996, Hardback
- 1996, UK, Macmillan, ISBN 0-333-66271-7 / 978-0-333-66271-7, 27 September 1996, Hardback
- 1997, USA, St Martin's Press, ISBN 0-312-15057-1 / 978-0-312-15057-0, April 1997, Hardback
- 1997, UK, ISIS Audio Books, ISBN 0-7531-0134-3 / 978-0-7531-0134-6, May 1997, Audio Cassette
- 1997, UK, Pan Books Limited, ISBN 0-330-35226-1 / 978-0-330-35226-0, 8 August 1997, Paperback
- 1997, UK, Magna Large Print Books, ISBN 0-7505-1148-6 / 978-0-7505-1148-3, 1 December 1997, Hardback
