= Sheila Mitchell =

British actress (1925–2026)

- Born: Sheila Mary Mitchell; 24 June 1925; Kingston-upon-Thames, Surrey, England
- Died: 4 June 2026 (aged 100)
- Occupations: Actress; author
- Spouse: H. R. F. Keating (m. 1953; died 2011)
- Children: 4

Sheila Mary Mitchell (24 June 1925 – 4 June 2026) was a British actress and author.

== Early life ==
Born in Kingston-upon-Thames, Surrey on 24 June 1925, Sheila Mitchell was a teenager during the Second World War and spent the last two years of that time in the WRNS (Women's Royal Navy Service) working at Bletchley Park. She then trained at the Central School of Speech and Drama in London. Lucky enough to work for BBC Radio while she was still a student, broadcasting remained a substantial part of her work, moving into recording Audio Books.

== Career ==
Mitchell found employment both in theatre – The Royal Shakespeare Company, Prospect at the Old Vic, West End productions working with stars like Donald Sinden, John Mills and Derek Jacobi as well as in television – among other programmes, Jeeves and Wooster, All Creatures Great and Small and countless sitcoms. Writing has been a late addition and she was very nearly 95 before appearing in print for the first time with the publication of H.R.F. Keating: A Life of Crime.

== Personal life and death ==
On leaving drama school she spent a few years working in theatre and it was while she was a member of the Swindon repertory company that she met H.R.F. (Harry) Keating who was employed by the local newspaper not only as a reporter and sub-editor but also as their theatre reviewer. They married in 1953 and after the birth of their first child in 1955 her career was put on hold and not resumed until the 1970s by which time they had four children.

Mitchell died on 4 June 2026, aged 100.

== Awards ==
At the Mystery Readers International, she won Macavity awards in 2020/21 in the Best Mystery Critical/Biography category for H.R.F. Keating: A Life of Crime published by Level Best Books of America.

== Filmography ==
TV Shows & Films
Year	Title	Role	Note
2017	Witless	Old Lady	1 episode
1996	Strange But True?	Reconstruction Cast	1 episode
1995	A Mind to Murder	Mrs. Fenton	TV movie
1992	Jeeves and Wooster	Charlotte	1 episode
1989	Capital City	Alex's Companion	1 episode
1989	All Creatures Great and Small	Mrs. Blackwood	1 episode
1989	The Bretts	Gladys	1 episode
1986	King & Castles	Secretary	1 episode
1986	No Place Like Home	Miss Stanforth	1 episode
1984	Shine on Harvey Home	Mother	1 episode
1983	Jemima Shore Investigates	Guest at Wine-Testing	1 episode
1982	Whodunnit?	SJ Banks	TV movie
1982	Grange Hill	Mrs. Harvey	1 episode
1981	Present Laughter	Miss Erikson	TV movie
1980	The Waterfall	Hospital sister	3 episode
1980	The Gentle Touch	Usher	1 episode
1979	The Strange Affair of Adelaide Harris	Mrs. Bostock	1 episode
1978	Lillie	Charlotte Knollys	3 episode
1964	Z Cars	Mrs. Connolly	1 episode
1963	Dr. Finlay's Casebook	Telephone Operator	1 episode
