= The Iciest Sin =

1990 novel by H. R. F. Keating

- First edition cover art of The Iciest Sin by H. R. F. Keating
- Author: H. R. F. Keating
- Cover artist: Ned Hoste, of the 2h Design
- Language: English
- Series: Inspector Ghote series
- Genre: Crime novel
- Publisher: Hutchinson
- Publication date: 4 October 1990 (1st edition)
- Publication place: United Kingdom
- Media type: Print (hardback)
- Pages: 162 pp (Hardback 1st edition)
- ISBN: 0-09-173745-1
- OCLC: 21229404
- LC Class: PR6061.E26 I25 1990b
- Preceded by: Dead on Time
- Followed by: Inspector Ghote, His Life and Crimes

The Iciest Sin is a crime novel by H. R. F. Keating. It is the eighteenth novel in the Inspector Ghote series but the nineteenth book to be published as an anthology of short stories was released the year before.

== Plot introduction ==
Additional Secretary for Department for Home Affairs Mr Z. R. Mistry requests Inspector Ghote's assistance on a strictly private matter. Unfortunately Mr Mistry has not selected Ghote for his zeal or powers of deduction but because he is "not in a position to make trouble". Thrust into a tangle of illegal activities including blackmail and murder, Ghote finds himself balanced on a knife-edge between right and wrong as he faces his greatest ever test as a detective and a person.

=== Explanation of the novel's title ===
The title is explained early in the novel by the character Z. R. Mistry: "Blackmail," he said, "Perhaps the most hateful crime, short of murder, that is to be found. I once read of it described as the iciest sin." (Keating, The Iciest Sin, Hutchinson, 1990, page 2).

On the dedication page Keating attributes the line "Blackmail is the iciest sin" to Rebecca West.

== Plot summary ==
Senior government official, Mr Mistry, requests Ghote's assistance on a "private matter". Mr Mistry's neighbour, Miss Daruwala, is blackmailing a Mr Pipewalla. Ghote is told to break into Daruwala's flat, spy on her then use what he sees to force her to leave India. Ghote considers this housebreaking and blackmail but cannot refuse.

At home Ghote's son, Ved, attempts to blackmail Ghote into buying a computer by threatening to tell Protima, Ghote's wife, their television was bought on the black market.

The next day Ghote blackmails a locksmith to get keys to Miss Daruwala's apartment, which Ghote's searches until she returns with Dr Edul Commissariat, a famous scientist. Ghote hides overhears that Commissariat submitted someone else's thesis as own work. Miss Daruwala demands "one lakh in cash" (100,000 rupees). Commissariat murders Miss Daruwala with a swordstick and burns the documents that incriminate her victims.

Afterwards, Ghote leaves his hiding place. He did not arrest Commissariat because the Doctor is a humanitarian and Miss Daruwala's was a blackmailer. Feeling responsible Dr Commissariat's fate, Ghote tells Mr Mistry that Daruwala is dead but not who murdered her. Inspector Arjun Singh of Crime Branch investigates the murder, reported by Ghote's anonymous phone call.

Ghote's is assigned to a blackmail case. Tabloid newspaper, Gup Shup, has blackmailed people into paying for an entry in Indians of Merit and Distinction. Freddy Kersasp is the ringleader but the evidence points to his office manager, Shiv Chand. Ghote arranges a sting operation, in which two people witness the payment.

Ghote returns home and finds Mr Ranchod, Mr Mistry's servant, waiting. Ranchod believes Ghote is blackmailing the murderer. Unwilling to tell Ranchod the truth, Ghote pays him one hundred rupees.

Ghote's sting operation goes well and Shiv Chand is arrested. Chand refuses to testify against Freddy Kersasp who is in the USA. Days pass. Inspector Singh's investigation makes no progress. Ranchod demands more money. Kersasp returns and fires Chand. Chand tells Ghote everything, but Kersasp's blackmail victims refuse to testify.

Ghote learns that Kersasp was the prime suspect in a robbery and murder thirty-seven years ago. Enquiries in England reveal that Kersasp did not raise the funds to start his newspaper by running a magazine there, as he claimed. There is insufficient evidence to convict Kersasp, but Ghote is ordered to blackmail him into leaving the country. Ghote does so.

Ghote refuses to pay Ranchod when they next meet and several weeks go by. Then Inspector Singh is transferred to the Vigilance Branch of Bombay Police (Internal Affairs) and the Daruwala murder case abandoned.

The next morning a notorious gangster, Mama Chiplunkar, approaches Ghtoe. Ranchod has spoken to Chiplunkar who intends to blackmail Ghote for confidential information. The following day Chiplunkar repeats his demand and Ghote gives in.

In court Shiv Chand is found guilty.

Ghote plans to push Chiplunkar under a train and arranges a meeting with Chiplunkar at Grant Road Station, using information about a raid as bait. A perfect opportunity to kill Chiplunkar arises but Ghote cannot bring himself to do it. Ghote rejects Chiplunkar's blackmail attempt and escapes on a train.

Ghote considers suicide, as he believes Chiplunkar will soon expose and disgrace him. He waits two days then learns Chiplunkar has fled to Ahmedabad. Ghote is called to the assistant commissioners office where he learns Chiplunkar has purchased Daruwala's flat as a hideout. Ghote deduces that Ranchod is hidden there, waiting for Chiplunkar's order to testify against Ghote. In spite of this, Ghote assists the search team in entering the property. Inside they find Ranchod dead from an overdose of narcotics. Chiplunkar returns home and is arrested for drug possession.

Anything Chiplunkar says about Ghote will be ignored without Ranchod. Ghote goes home and tells Ved that he can have the computer.

== Characters in "The Iciest Sin" ==
Inspector Ganesh Ghote: An honest and hard working inspector in the Bombay Police CID. Husband to Protima Ghote and father of Ved Ghote.

Protima Ghote: Wife of Inspector Ganesh Ghote and mother to Ved. Her prejudice against smuggled goods becomes a point of the novel's subplot, in which Ved wants to acquire a home computer.

Ved Ghote: Inspector Ghote's son. Top of his class in most subjects at school and he is approaching puberty. Ved is keen to acquire a home computer, which the family can only afford to buy on the black market.

Z. R. Mistry: A senior government official holding the post of Additional Secretary at the Department for Home Affairs and a prominent member of the Parsi community. Also the cousin of Mr Burjor Pipewalla.

Mr Ranchod: A servant who worked for Mr Mistry at the time of Ghote's original assignment. Ranchod was a drug addict who tried to fund his habit by blackmailing Ghote until Ghote refused to pay. Ranchod then went to Mama Chiplunka

Dolly Daruwala: A Parsi spinster, who is somewhat overweight and asthmatic. She learned to blackmail at a very early age and continued to do so, amassing a fortune that allowed her to live better than Mr Mistry, a senior government official.

Burjor Pipewalla: A tax accountant whose files have been stolen by Miss Daruwala and who has subsequently submitted to blackmail by her in order to protect his clients. Also a cousin of Mr Mistry, who he has approached for help.

Inspector Arjun Singh: A dedicated hunter of criminals.

Shiv Chand: Office manager at the tabloid newspaper Gup Shup who attempts to blackmail a Bombay concert pianist.

Freddy Kersasp: Owner, editor and journalist for the Mumbai tabloid Gup Shup. Claims to have run a similar newspaper in the United Kingdom but in fact acquired the money to start his business from a robbery and murder. Blackmailed wealthy people into buying entries in the never published vanity publication Indians of Merit and Distinction under the threat of seeing their scandals exposed in Gup Shup.

Mama Chiplunka: A very dangerous kingpin in the Mumbai underworld. Chiplunka had a mole in the Police force who passed information to him. When this informant died of natural causes Chiplunka approached Ghote and tried to blackmail him with the information he got from Ranchod.

== Major themes ==
The single theme throughout the novel is blackmail, from Ved's childish attempts to pressure his father into buying the latest gadget using emotional blackmail, to the professional gangster's attempts to force a policeman to betray his colleagues. In the course of the novel Ghote experiences blackmail from every possible angle, as the witness, the policeman, the blackmailer and the victim.

== Literary significance & criticism ==
Details needed.

== Allusions/references to other works ==
Writer Rebecca West is credited as the inspiration for the title on the dedication page.

The Duke of York's famous declaration to a potential blackmailer, "Publish and be damned" is referred to frequently in the novel.

== Allusions/references to actual history, geography and current science ==
The novel is set in Mumbai, India. The confrontation between Ghote and Chiplunka takes place in Grant Road railway station.

== Release details ==
- 1990, UK, Hutchinson, ISBN 0-09-173745-1 / 978-0-09-173745-0, 4 October 1990, Hardback
- 1990, USA, Mysterious Press, ISBN 0-89296-427-8 / 978-0-89296-427-7, November 1990, Hardback
- 1991, UK, Arrow Books Limited, ISBN 0-09-978480-7 / 978-0-09-978480-7, 3 October 1991, Paperback
- 1991, USA, Warner Books, ISBN 0-446-40062-9 / 978-0-446-40062-6, 1 January 1991, Paperback
- 1992, UK, Magna Large Print Books, ISBN 0-7505-0421-8 / 978-0-7505-0421-8, November 1992, Hardback
- 1993, USA, Recorded Books, ISBN 1-55690-891-1 / 9781556908910, 1993, Audio Cassette
