= Andorra (disambiguation) =

Andorra is a country in Europe.

Andorra may also refer to:

== Places ==
=== Spain ===
- Andorra-Sierra de Arcos, a comarca in Aragon
- Andorra, a town and municipality in Province of Teruel, Spain

=== Elsewhere ===
- Andorra, Philadelphia, Pennsylvania, a neighborhood in Northwest Philadelphia
- Andorra la Vella, the capital of Andorra
- Andorra, Cuba, former name of the settlement of Abraham Lincoln in Cuba

== Other ==
- FC Andorra, a football club in Andorra la Vella, Andorra, that plays in the Spanish league system
- Andorra CF, a football team in Andorra, Teruel, Spain
- Andorra (album), a 2007 album by Caribou
- Andorra (novel), a 1997 novel by Peter Cameron
- Andorra (play), a play by Max Frisch
- Andorra (film), a 2019 film directed by Fred Schepisi

== See also ==
- Andora, a town on the Italian Riviera
- Endora (disambiguation)
