= Inspector Ghote =

Fictional detective created by H.R.F. Keating

Ganesh Ghote
- First appearance: The Perfect Murder (1964)
- Last appearance: A Small Case for Inspector Ghote? (2009)
- Created by: H. R. F. Keating
- Portrayed by: Zia Mohyeddin; Kevork Malikyan; Sam Dastor; Naseeruddin Shah

In-universe information
- Gender: Male
- Title: Inspector
- Occupation: Police detective
- Spouse: Protima
- Children: Ved
- Nationality: Indian

Inspector Ganesh Ghote (pronounced GO-tay) is a fictional Indian police officer who is the main character in English author H. R. F. Keating's detective novels. Ghote is an inspector in the police force of Bombay (a.k.a. Mumbai), India.

== Overview ==
Ghote first appeared in the novel The Perfect Murder (1964), in which his investigation of the apparent murder of the Parsi, Mr Perfect, was assisted informally by the Swedish UNESCO analyst Axel Svensson. The novel, which Keating wrote without ever having been to India, won a Crime Writers' Association Gold Dagger Award and was adapted into a film in 1988 by Merchant Ivory.

H. R. F. Keating intended Ghote's final appearance to be in the novel Breaking and Entering (2000), in which he was reunited with Axel Svensson as he investigated a series of cat burglaries that ultimately enabled him to solve the high-profile murder that was occupying the rest of his colleagues. Since that time, however, Keating has written Inspector Ghote's First Case (2008) and A Small Case For Inspector Ghote? (2009).

Ghote's father appears in the novel The Murder of the Maharajah (1980). Ghote is married; his wife, Protima, is a beautiful, spirited, and argumentative, though loving, Bengali. They have a son, Ved, invariably referred to in the earlier novels as "little Ved". In most novels, Ghote finds that he has to spend almost as much time fighting the Indian criminal justice system bureaucracy as he does in fighting criminals. He also tends to get little respect from the often rich and powerful people he must investigate in connection with his work, though in the end he typically wins the day through sheer doggedness. In these characteristics, he has been compared to the American fictional detective Columbo.

== Adaptations ==
=== Film ===
The noted actor Naseeruddin Shah played the role of Ghote in The Perfect Murder.

=== Television ===
Zia Mohyeddin starred in an adaptation of Inspector Ghote Hunts the Peacock for the BBC anthology series Detective.

Inspector Ghosts Moves In was the first episode of the 1980s Thames Television series Storyboard. Sam Dastor played Ghote.

In May 2020, Endemol Shine India was announced to adapt the novels for Television. As of 2024, there has been no word on the project.

=== BBC Radio ===
Kevork Malikyan played Ghote twice: Inspector Ghote Makes a Journey (1973) and Inspector Ghote and the River Man (1974).

In 1984, Sam Dastor starred in Inspector Ghote Hunts the Peacock.)

== List of books ==
- The Perfect Murder (1964, CWA Gold Dagger Award winner)
- Inspector Ghote's Good Crusade (1966)
- Inspector Ghote Caught in Meshes (1967)
- Inspector Ghote Hunts the Peacock (1968)
- Inspector Ghote Plays a Joker (1969)
- Inspector Ghote Breaks an Egg (1970)
- Inspector Ghote Goes By Train (1971)
- Inspector Ghote Trusts the Heart (1972)
- Bats Fly Up for Inspector Ghote (1974)
- Filmi, Filmi, Inspector Ghote (1976)
- Inspector Ghote Draws a Line (1979)
- The Murder of the Maharajah (1980, CWA Gold Dagger Award winner)
- Go West Inspector Ghote (1981)
- The Sheriff of Bombay (1984)
- Under a Monsoon Cloud (1986)
- The Body in the Billiard Room (1987)
- Dead on Time (1988)
- The Iciest Sin (1990)
- Inspector Ghote, His Life and Crimes (1989); short story collection
- Cheating Death (1992)
- Doing Wrong (1993)
- Asking Questions (1996)
- Bribery, Corruption Also (1999)
- Breaking and Entering (2000)
- Inspector Ghote's First Case (2008)
- A Small Case for Inspector Ghote? (2009)
