= Andorinha =

Municipality of Bahia, Brazil

- Municipality
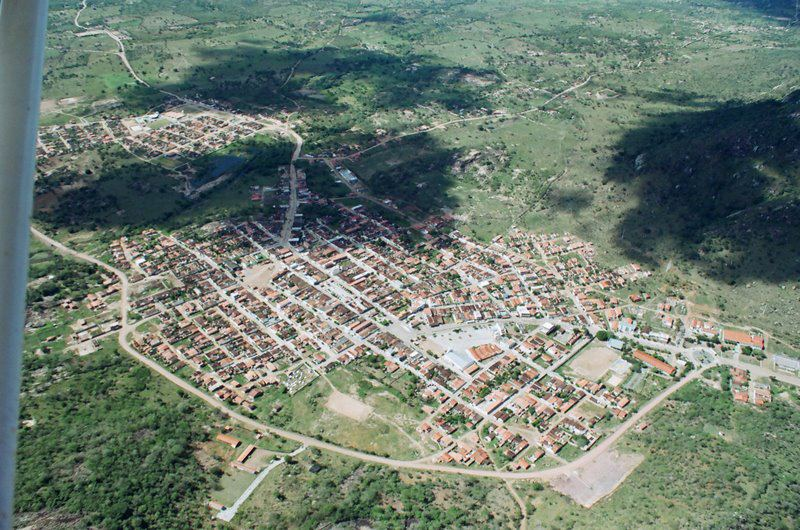
- Aerial view of Andorinha

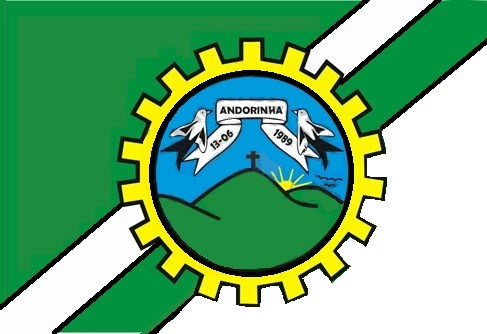
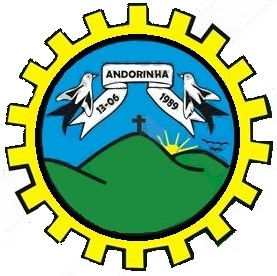
- Flag Coat of arms
- Etymology: In English "Swallow", named after a rock which served as a resting place for the birds
- Location of Andorinha in Bahia

- Location within Brazil Location within South America
- Coordinates: 10°20′42″S 39°49′58″W
- Country: Brazil
- Region: Northeast
- State: Bahia
- Founded: 13 June 1989

Government
  - Mayor: Adilberto Evangelista de Souza (PODE) (2025-2028)
  - Vice Mayor: José Vagner Araujo de Lavor (MDB) (2025-2028)

Area
  - Total: 1,362.386 km^{2} (526.020 sq mi)
- Elevation: 453 m (1,486 ft)

Population (2022)
  - Total: 15,012
  - Density: 11.02/km^{2} (28.5/sq mi)
- Demonym: Andorinhense (Brazilian Portuguese)
- Time zone: UTC-03:00 (Brasília Time)
- Postal code: 48990-000, 48993-000, 48994-000
- HDI (2010): 0.588 – medium
- Website: andorinha.ba.gov.br

Andorinha is a municipality in the Brazilian state of Bahia. Its estimated population in 2020 was 14,503.

== See also ==
- List of municipalities in Bahia
