= Andar, Tehran =

Coordinates: 35°52′N 51°43′E

Andar (Persian: اَندار, also Romanized as Andār) is a settlement in Tehran Province, Iran.
