= Inspector Ghote Plays a Joker =

1969 novel by H. R. F. Keating

Inspector Ghote Plays A Joker
- First edition
- Author: H. R. F. Keating
- Language: English
- Series: Inspector Ghote
- Genre: Crime
- Publisher: Collins Crime Club
- Publication date: January 1969
- Publication place: United Kingdom
- Media type: Print (Hardback)
- Pages: 224 pp
- ISBN: 0-00-231346-4
- OCLC: 15779
- Dewey Decimal: 823/.9/14
- LC Class: PZ4.K253 Imo3 PR6061.E26
- Preceded by: Inspector Ghote Hunts the Peacock
- Followed by: Inspector Ghote Breaks an Egg

Inspector Ghote Plays A Joker is a crime novel by H. R. F. Keating. It is the fifth novel in the Inspector Ghote series.

== Plot introduction ==
Inspector Ghote is summoned by the Deputy Superintendent of Police and assigned what initially appears to be a fool's errand: preventing the shooting of a red flamingo at the Bombay Zoo, the last of four birds presented by the American consul.

The flamingo incident proves to be only the beginning of a long and challenging investigation for Ghote, involving a donkey substituted for a prize racehorse at the start of a race, a disgraced scientist, and a cold-blooded murder.

=== Explanation of the novel's title ===
The majority of the novel's plot concerns Ghote's pursuit of a monstrous practical joker.

== Plot summary ==
Ghote is summoned by the Deputy Superintendent of Police and charged to protect a flamingo presented to Bombay Zoological Gardens by the American Consulate. The bird is one of four and the other three have already been shot. At the zoo the inspector interviews a senior zoo official who informs him that the director of the zoo has ordered that the bird be left on display in order to trap the perpetrator. During the interview the bird is shot. Ghote believes the marksman is in a clock tower, which he searches. He does not find the marksman but does note the smell of fine tobacco.

The next day Ghote arrives at the office to find Sergeant Desai has been allocated to his investigation of the shooting. This does not please Ghote, as Desai has a reputation for hilarious incompetence. Desai tells Ghote that a donkey was substituted for the favourite racehorse in the derby three months earlier and Ghote realises they are dealing with a rich and cruel practical joker.

Ghote's investigation is interrupted by a phone call from Mister Ram Kundah, deputy to the Minister for Police Affairs and the Arts. Kundah wants to liaise with Ghote on the investigation. Ghote and Desai go to the records department to check for other incidents that resemble practical jokes. Here Ghote first hears of the guru who intends to attempt to walk on water and finds a complaint from Professor Rustom Engineer.

Professor Rustom Engineer was a well-respected a scientist until he presented a new desalination machine to the media. A reporter discovered that, without the Professor's knowledge, someone had installed a small pump into the machine to remove the salt water and replace it with ordinary tap water. The next day Ghote goes to the racecourse to interview the owner of the racehorse that was replaced by a donkey, Mr Bedekar. Here Ghote meets Jack Cooper, an English alcoholic follower of horse racing, and "Bunny" Bender, who has inherited the title of Raja but appears to have only modest financial means. Bedekar is unenthusiastic about renewed police interest into the incident, but Bender seems more interested in helping. In order to educate Ghote in the subject of horse racing, Bender persuades Ghote to place a bet of 50 Rupees on a horse called "Cream of the Jest". Unexpectedly the horse finishes first, but a steward's inquiry seems to rob Ghote of his winnings. Only when Ghote finds Desai does he learn that the objection to "Cream of the Jest" was overturned and that he has indeed won enough money for a good air-conditioner. As Ghote collects his winnings he again encounters Bender, who offers to use his connections to obtain Ghote an interview with Professor Rustom Engineer.

At the professor's house Sir Rustom talks of the prank that was played on him very reluctantly. He admits to taking his work very seriously and only revisits the memory when Ghote reminds him that there have been other victims. Rustom Engineer tells Ghote that he had two trusted assistants (no longer with him) who had worked for him for many years. Rustom often showed friends and visitors the workshop and the machine he was working on. He shows Ghote the machine he showed to the press, complete with the pump that was used to fool him. The next day Ghote is telephoned by Raja Bender, who wants Ghote to accompany him to see the yogi Lal Das attempt to walk on water. Ghote is alarmed to learn that tickets are being sold for up to 500 rupees and strongly suspects that another prank is about to be played. Raja Bender has also invited Rustom Engineer, Jack Cooper and Ram Kundar to witness the attempt. Lal Das begins his attempt to walk on water and immediately fails. Ghote becomes concerned when the yogi does not emerge from the tank and is forced to dive into the tank to rescue him. The yogi survives and Ghote resolves to interview Lal Das to learn who convinced him that he could walk on water. Ghote deduces that a heavy sheet of glass placed below the surface of the water must have been used to fool the yogi. A brief search locates the glass sheet at the back of the temple.

The next day Ghote is in a meeting with Ram Kundar when Raja Bender calls him unexpectedly. Ghote accuses Bender of being the prankster and Bender invites him to see him in his summer home so they can talk about it. Ghote accepts and at the summer home a Sikh servant shows Ghote in to see Raja Bender. Bender is certain that no charges will be brought against him because of his privileged social position, because of the ridiculous nature of the charges themselves and because of the lack of material evidence.

Bender persuades Ghote to play cards and bet the money he won at the horse race against an assurance the Raja will play no more practical jokes. At a loss for any better idea, Ghote agrees to the game and the wager. Raja Bender wins the game easily, possibly cheating, as well as a second round played for double or quits. Ghote is given until the next day to pay the debt then sent away by the Raja, who carelessly says that the rifle used to shoot the flamingos has been stolen. Ghote is forced to borrow to meet his gambling debt. That evening he plays with his son, Ved. While playing, Ghote decides to play a joke on Ved by hiding behind a bush. Ved is terrified by this prank and Ghote is instantly remorseful. Later Ghote calls the office and orders Desai to ask Rustom Engineer if the Raja had left the rifle at the professor's home. When Desai does not report back Ghote must visit the professor's home to search for the sergeant. The professor denies any knowledge of the sergeant's visit or the theft of the Raja's rifle.

Later, Ghote receives a telephone call telling him that the Raja, "Bunny" Bender, has been shot dead at his summer home. Ghote is ordered to go and take charge of the investigation. At the scene he meets Inspector Gadgil, who has arrested the Sikh servant, Mr Singh. Ghote interviews the suspect but quickly clears him. Singh says no one wanted to kill Bender, which surprises Ghote, until Singh explains that "Bunny" Bender did not care enough about anyone to kill them and therefore everyone he knew felt the same about him. Ghote tells Singh of the Raja's practical jokes, which Singh has trouble believing.

The next day Ghote visits and interviews Mr Bedekar. Bedekar confirms that at the time his horse was replaced by a donkey, costing him a winning place in the derby, he would have killed the person responsible. Bedekar claims he still does not know who was responsible for this. The interview ends when Sergeant Desai is caught attempting to obtain inside information for gambling on horse races.

Afterwards Ghote goes to interview Lal Das, the yogi. Lal Das is quite mild mannered and unperturbed by his recent disgrace. He freely admits that he was made to look a fool, but is philosophical about it. He tells Ghote that he was persuaded to walk on the water in a specially made tank only to prove that he could not do it, yet found he was able to do so. He could not explain this and it puzzled him greatly. When he tried again in front of the crowd he failed. Yogi Lal Das thanks Ghote for saving him, though the yogi's spiritual beliefs mean that he considers his life to be of little importance. After interviewing the yogi, Ghote is summoned to an interview with Ram Kundah. At first Ghote suspects he is about to be rebuked but it emerges that Kundah only wants to learn the details of Ghote's investigation. Ghote again interviews Rustom Engineer. The interview proves difficult and Rustom admits being deeply affected by joke that was played on him, but claims to have spent the evening of the murder at home with his brother.

After the interview with Rustom Engineer, Ghote receives a telephone call that informs him that Lal Das has been arrested by Inspector Gadgil. Lal Das was found occupying the garden shed of the late Raja "Bunny" Bender's summer home. Ghote is told by Lal Das that the street urchins tormented him until he was forced to leave the spot where he meditated. He knew the house was empty from Ghote's earlier interview and went there for peace and quiet. Inspector Gadgil is disappointed that Lal Das is not the murderer. Before Ghote can leave two constables bring Jack Cooper in for being drunk and disorderly. Cooper tries to wheedle Ghote into having him released and in the process mentions that Bedekar had "Bunny" Bender investigated by a private detective.

Ghote revisits Bedekar who claims that before the Raja was shot he discovered one of his racehorses was of good enough quality to win the next derby, which means he has no motive for the murder. By a process of elimination Ghote realises that Professor Rustom Engineer is the only suspect left. He visits the professor's home again and interviews the professor's brother. The professor's brother denies the professor's alibi but also undermines the professor's motive. The professor's research had gone down a blind alley decades ago and he was too old to start again, so secretly the professor welcomed the excuse to abandon his work.

Ghote returns to the police station and catches Sergeant Desai playing cards with a joker in the pack. This inspires Ghote and he goes to visit Ram Kundah. Ghote notes that Kundah devotes himself to his job twenty-four hours a day, every day with complete single-mindedness. Ghote characterises Kundah as "totally serious". Kundah accepts this because he sees nothing wrong with the description. Ghote explains that when he is looking for a murderer, he is looking for someone who was at least totally serious at the time of the crime. He observes that Kundah has several times stressed that he did not know that "Bunny" Bender was the prankster, even though Ghote was with Kundah during the telephone call in which Ghote first accused Bender of committing the pranks.

Kundah attempts to flee but is overpowered by Ghote and Sergeant Desai. Back at the police station the Deputy Superintendent of Police, who has not yet heard the news of the arrest, tells Ghote that Kundah has contacted him with news of a vacancy for a security officer in the ministry. He intends to recommend Sergeant Desai for the role.

== Characters in "Inspector Ghote Plays a Joker" ==
Inspector Ganesh Ghote
A hard working Bombay police inspector.

The cover pictures of Inspector Ghote were modeled by Zulfiqar Qureshi.

Sergeant Desai
Comically inept and incompetent assistant to Inspector Ghote.

Ram Kundah
The son of a former minister who was forced to resign, Kundah works as a spokesman for the current Minister for Police Affairs and the Arts.

Professor Rustom Engineer
A once respected scientist who worked on the desalination of sea water to produce drinking water, discredited by a malicious prankster.

Mr Bedekar
Racehorse owner whose horse was replaced by a donkey on the morning of a race. Mr Bedekar is a wealthy, self-made man, who started life as a street urchin.

Raja "Bunny" Bender
A friendly and charming member of the Mumbai racing community who has inherited the title of Raja.

Mr Cooper
A British national and an alcoholic who is part of the Mumbai racing community.

Ved Ghote
Inspector Ghote's six-year-old son.

== Major themes ==
The story is a mystery thriller in two parts. In the first part the mystery is centred on the identity of the person playing practical jokes on well-respected members of Mumbai society. In the second part the mystery is which of these victims responded by murdering the prankster.

The common theme is the human sense of humour, who has it and who does not. Ghote is, for the most part, perhaps a little on the serious side; this is reflected by the way he fails to respond to a good-humoured joke by his superior at the beginning of the novel but as the story continues Ghote learns. Halfway through the story he plays a joke on his young son that misfires, which suggests that while he has a sense of humour it is underdeveloped. By the end of the story Ghote is able to share a conspiratorial wink with his superior at the news that his inept sergeant is to become a security guard in the ministry where the murderer worked.

== Literary significance and criticism ==
Amazon.com's page for Inspector Ghote Plays a Joker contains the following quote from a review by AudioFile.

Harry Keating's Inspector Ghote novels, set in Bombay, India, present a unique challenge to a narrator: to read Indian dialect with respect and accuracy. Narrator Sam Dastor, a Shakespearean actor whose audiobook credits include works by Kipling, Forster, and Naipaul, meets the challenge in this police adventure. After the killing of valuable flamingos at the Bombay Zoo and the substitution of a prize race horse with a donkey, Inspector Ghote and his hapless sergeant are called on to stop the heartless practical joker--until murder turns up a full house. The plot of this mystery is good, but plays second fiddle to Keating's characterizations and Dastor's expert reading. S.E.S.

— © AudioFile 2002, Portland, Maine-- Copyright © AudioFile, Portland, Maine

Twbooks.co.uk includes the following favourable quotes in the section on Inspector Ghote Plays a Joker.

'Virtuous, good-natured, not very efficient. . the Inspector is a fine comic character.'

— Julian Symons, Sunday Times

'The Inspector himself is as endearing as ever.'

— Daily Telegraph

'Inspector Ghote is that rare thing, a vivid recognisable character.'

— Anthony Lejeune, Tablet

== Allusions/references to actual history, geography and current science ==
The novel is set in Mumbai, India.

== Release details ==
- 1969, UK, Collins, ISBN 0-00-231346-4 / 978-0-00-231346-9, January 1969, Hardback
- 1971, UK, Penguin, ISBN 0-14-003073-5 / 978-0-14-003073-0, 24 June 1971, Paperback
- 1981, UK, Hamlyn, ISBN 0-600-20310-7 / 978-0-600-20310-0, 23 July 1981, Paperback
- 1984, US, Academy Chicago Publications, ISBN 0-89733-096-X / 978-0-89733-096-1, 15 Jan 1984
- 1984, UK, Severn House Publishers Limited, ISBN 0-7278-1088-X / 978-0-7278-1088-5, 27 December 1984, Paperback
- 1987, UK, Mysterious Press, ISBN 0-09-950280-1 / 978-0-09-950280-7, 19 February 1987, Paperback
- 2001, UK, Chivers Audio Book, ISBN 0-7540-0753-7 / 978-0-7540-0753-1, December 2001, Audio Cassette
- 2005, US, Thorndike Press, ISBN 0-7862-7427-1 / 978-0-7862-7427-7, June 2005, Hardback
