= The Perfect Murder (novel) =

Book by H. R. F. Keating

- First edition
- Author: H. R. F. Keating
- Language: English
- Genre: crime novel
- Publisher: Collins Crime Club
- Publication date: 1964
- Publication place: United Kingdom
- Media type: Print (Hardcover)
- Pages: 249 pp
- ISBN: 0-00-231683-8
- OCLC: 16545741

The Perfect Murder is a crime novel by H. R. F. Keating.

The novel is the first appearance of Keating's serial detective, Inspector Ghote of Mumbai police, in which his investigation of the apparent murder of the Parsi Mr Perfect was assisted informally by the Swedish UNESCO analyst Axel Svensson. The novel, which Keating wrote without ever having been to India, won a Crime Writers' Association Gold Dagger Award in 1964.

It was adapted into a film in 1988 produced by Merchant Ivory starring Stellan Skarsgård as Svensson and Naseeruddin Shah as Inspector Ghote.
