= Andar, Fars =

Andar اندر
- Village
- Location within Iran
- Coordinates: 27°33′56″N 53°07′06″E
- Country: Iran
- Province: Fars
- County: Lamerd
- Bakhsh: Alamarvdasht
- Rural District: Kheyrgu

Population (2006)
  - Total: 149
- Time zone: UTC+3:30 (IRST)
  - Summer (DST): UTC+4:30 (IRDT)

Andar (Persian: اندر; also known as Andarī) is a village in Kheyrgu Rural District, Alamarvdasht District, Lamerd County, Fars province, Iran. At the 2006 census, its population was 149, in 27 families.
