= Into Battle (play) =

2021 British stage play by Hugh Salmon

Into Battle is a stage play written by Hugh Salmon, which received its premiere at the Greenwich Theatre in London in October 2021.

The play tells the story of a bitter feud between the privileged Old Etonians at Balliol College, Oxford and a more socially aware group of non-Etonians during the run-up to the First World War. Into Battle features a number of historical characters including the wealthy socialite Ettie Grenfell, Baroness Desborough; her two sons Julian Grenfell (after whose poem the play is named) and Billy Grenfell; Patrick Shaw-Stewart, another war poet; Ronald Poulton, the distinguished rugby player; and the respected theologian Reverend Neville Talbot.

== Plot ==
Of the fifty-six freshers in the 1906 intake to Balliol College, Oxford, eighteen had been to Eton College. A ‘bitter feud’ developed between these Old Etonians and the rest of the college. In his 1959 biography of one of these Etonians, the theologian Ronald Knox, the acclaimed novelist Evelyn Waugh described the Balliol Feud as follows:

'These Balliol Etonians did not mix with 'the intelligent men from Birmingham etc.'; they did not mix with men from other public schools; they did not mix much with Etonians at other colleges, insisting at the Oxford Old Boy dinner on having a table to themselves. They formed yet another set in Balliol, an especially flamboyant and rumbustious one. They took possession of the Anna (the Annandale Society, a dining club), and after their dinners took possession of the college, sending 'water-falls' of crockery down XIV staircase, serenading Gordouli of Trinity, and chasing nonentities out of the quad. When they came up, Balliol had only one man in the Bullingdon, and he was so little regarded that his hunting breeches were hung in a tree. By their third year almost all the 'Anna' were members, and no one in the college disputed their pre-eminence. They were arrogant, rowdy, and exclusive, but unlike their counterparts at Magdalen and the House they were not mere sprigs of fashion. They were prizewinners, both athletic and academic. When they referred to the rest of college (as without rancour they did) as 'the plebs', they were not making any conventional distinction of social class ... They had standards of behaviour; they were often 'buffy', never sottish. They paid for the damage they did. They talked well. All of them loved poetry, and many of them wrote it. Several had outstanding good looks. They were fiercely hostile to the cult of decadence. Many of them, in their different ways, were religious.’

The play opens against the background of the January 1910 general election and focuses on three Etonians in the Annandale Society: Julian Grenfell, his younger brother Billy, and Patrick Shaw-Stewart all of whom despised other students who they referred to as 'plebs.' They took a particular dislike to Ronald Poulton and Poulton's good friend Keith Rae.

Ronnie Poulton had scored a record five tries in the Varsity match on 11 December 1909, still known as Poulton’s Match and had just been capped as an England rugby international at the very first match played at Twickenham Stadium on 15 January 1910.

Keith Rae from Liverpool was a Christian Socialist with very strong social convictions. His grandfather was the banker George Rae, a noted patron of the Pre-Raphaelite art movement, in particular Dante Gabriel Rossetti. Not only had the young Keith Rae not been to Eton but he had been educated at home due to his contracting tuberculosis as a child.

By the 1912 summer term at Balliol, and the second act of Into Battle, the 1906 intake have all left Balliol and the Balliol Feud has become personal between Keith Rae, who has extended his university career to focus on helping the underprivileged ‘scruffs’ from the back streets of Oxford through the Balliol Boys Club, and Billy Grenfell who had been admitted to Balliol in 1909, three years after his brother Julian.

Rae abhorred the loutish behaviour of the Annandale Society, which included releasing rabbits in a closed quad in which a bulldog ravaged them to death, rampaging through the college dressed as cavemen and a particularly notorious incident where Billy Grenfell smashed up Keith Rae’s room and hurled his contents out of the window and into the Quad below. After this incident Billy Grenfell was arrested but, thanks to his social standing and the influence of his parents, Lord Desborough and Lady Desborough, criminal charges were dropped but Billy was sent down from Oxford for a year.

The third and final Act of Into Battle is set in the trenches of the First World War. All five of the Balliol students see action and all five of them are killed. Touchingly and by an extraordinary twist of fate, Keith Rae and Billy Grenfell fought alongside each other for the same regiment on the same day (30 July 1915) in the Battle of Hooge (Belgium).

== Hugh Salmon ==
As the creator of SFX Cassette Magazine, the music magazine on audio cassette launched in 1982, Salmon pursued a career in advertising, media and marketing.

He would later become managing director of CM:Lintas in London and get embroiled in a five-year-long legal tussle to clear his name following accusations by the agency, which were eventually dropped by Lintas. The case was finally closed when Salmon was awarded significant damages and Lintas made a formal apology.

In 1999, Hugh founded his own advertising agency, The Salmon Agency.

Hugh is the son of Gerald Mordaunt Broome Salmon and the brother of England rugby player, Jamie Salmon.

== Reception ==
The play received reviews from both The Times and The Guardian.
