= Taplow Court =

Victorian house in Buckinghamshire, England

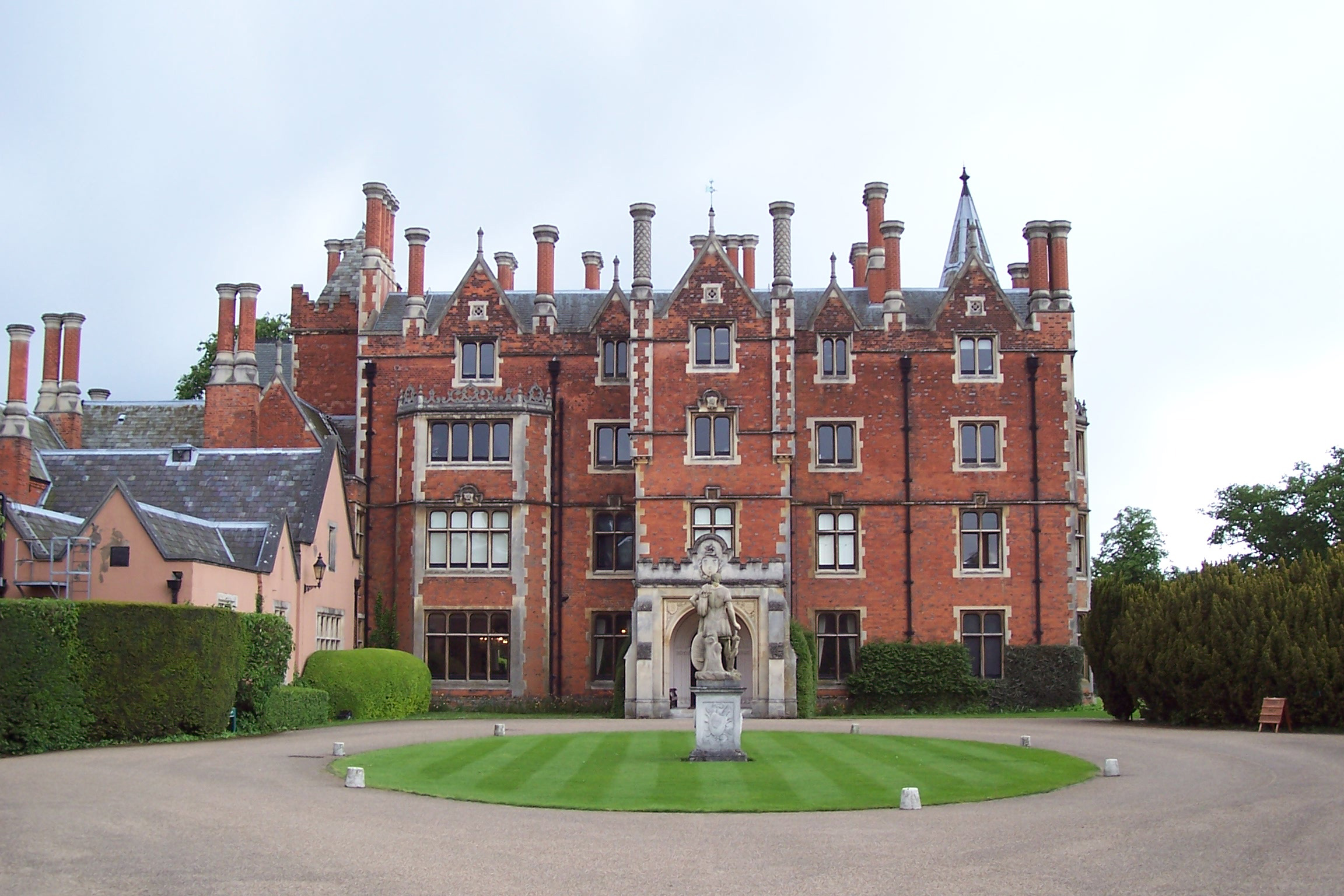

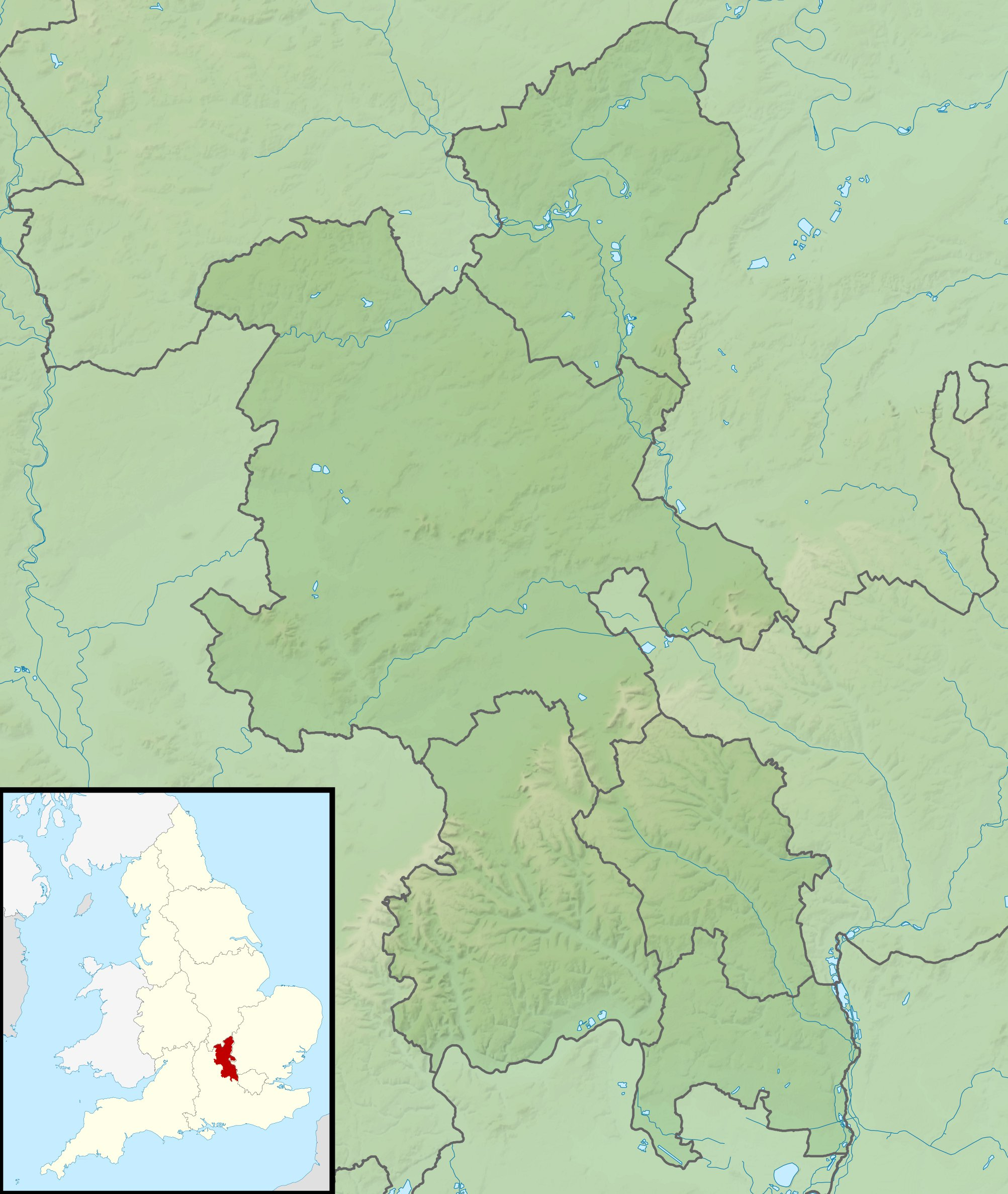
- Location within Buckinghamshire
- 51.5316°N 0.6947°W
- Type: House
- Location: Taplow, Buckinghamshire, England

History
- Built: 1855 with earlier origins

Site notes
- Architect: William Burn
- Architectural style: Tudorbethan
- Governing body: Soka Gakkai International

Listed Building – Grade II
- Official name: Taplow Court
- Designated: 26 April 1985
- Reference no.: 1165286

Taplow Court is a Victorian house in the village of Taplow in Buckinghamshire, England. Its origins are an Elizabethan manor house, remodelled in the early 17th century. In the 18th century the court was owned by the Earls of Orkney. In the 1850s, the court was sold to Charles Pascoe Grenfell, whose descendants retained ownership until after the Second World War. The court then served as a corporate headquarters for British Telecommunications Research (BTR), an independent research company set up in 1946. BTR was subsequently acquired by Plessey Electronics. In 1988 it was bought by the Buddhist foundation Soka Gakkai International and serves as their UK headquarters.

The court is a Grade II listed building, and its present appearance is due to a major rebuilding undertaken by William Burn for Charles Grenfell in 1855–1860. In the early 20th century, the court was home to William Grenfell and his wife Ettie. She was a noted Edwardian hostess, and Taplow Court became a gathering place for The Souls, a group of aristocratic intellectuals.

== History ==
Pevsner and Williamson record the court's "complicated" history. Its origins are an Elizabethan manor, which was reconstructed after a fire in 1616 by Sir Henry Guildford. In the 18th and early 19th centuries the court was owned by the Earls of Orkney, who has also owned the adjacent Cliveden.

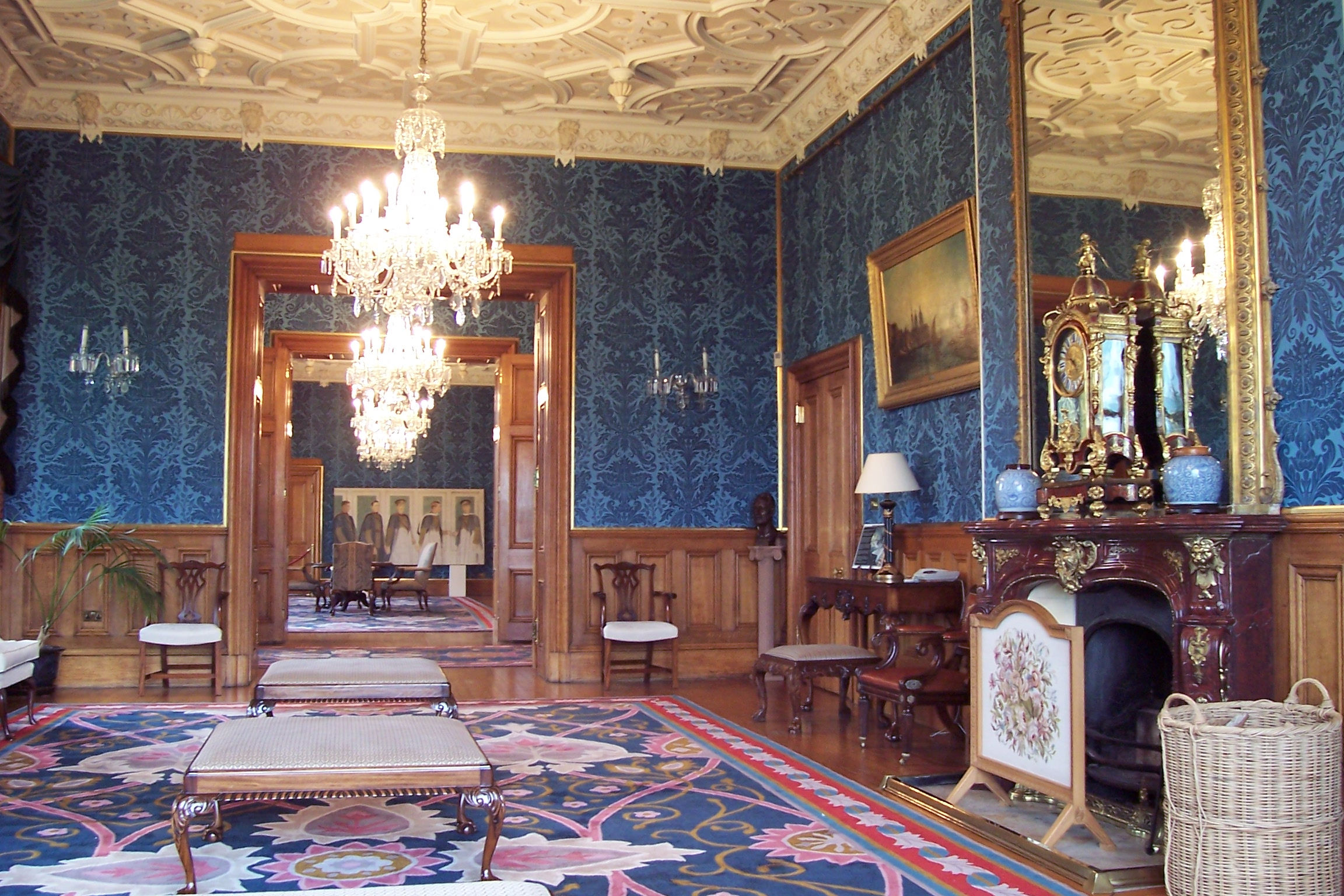
A room at Taplow Court

From 1852, Taplow Court became the home of the Grenfell family, purchased by Charles Pascoe Grenfell in August of that year. It was inherited in 1867 by his grandson William Grenfell, 1st Baron Desborough where a prominent social role was also played by his wife Ettie. Ettie was described by her nephew David Cecil as "the most brilliant hostess in an age of brilliant hostesses", and hosted an aristocratic group known as "the Souls" at the house. Visitors included Henry Irving, Vita Sackville-West, Edward VII then Prince of Wales, Winston Churchill, H. G. Wells, Patrick Shaw Stewart, Edith Wharton and Oscar Wilde.

During the Great War, the Grenfells lost two of their three sons. (Note: The third, Ivo, died in a car accident in 1926.)Julian was killed by a shell splinter in May 1915, and his brother Billy was killed in July the same year. A letter of condolence from Arthur Balfour, printed in the Grenfell's Family Journal, begins: "I do not pretend to offer consolation; in one very real sense there is no consolation to be offered. The blow, the double blow, has fallen and the shock which threatens the very citadel of life can be softened by nothing that I or perhaps any other can do or utter".

A stické court was built by William Grenfell at Taplow Court in 1892 and the dimension of this court subsequently became the standard size of the court. (Note: Grenfell patented the design for his court, and the game was keenly played by members of the Souls. Lord Islington built a court at his country home, Hartham House in Wiltshire, and yet a third was constructed close by at Cliveden.)

In 1913 Taplow Court was rented by Rodman Wanamaker, the U.S. Department Store magnate. After World War II, Taplow Court was owned by British Telecommunications Research, a subsidiary of Plessey Electronics, until 1988, when it became a Soka Gakkai International (SGI) Buddhist centre.

== Description ==
The present building dates mainly from William Burn's rebuilding in 1855–1860. Historic England describes Burn's chosen style for the exterior of the court as "early Tudor", and its interior as "Romanesque". Constructed of red brick, with four storeys and slate roofs, it is a Grade II listed building. The interior contains a double-height hall, enclosing the Elizabethan inner courtyard, which was undertaken for Lord Orkney and has been attributed to Thomas Hopper, the architect of Penrhyn Castle. Pevsner notes the "beautiful" restoration of the house, undertaken by SGI. The grounds have their own Grade II listing on HE's Parks and Gardens Register.

== Sources ==
- Davenport-Hines, Richard (2012). Ettie: The Intimate Life And Dauntless Spirit Of Lady Desborough. London: Hachette. ISBN 9780297856221.
- Grenfell, Ettie (1916). Pages From A Family Journal, 1888-1915. Eton, Royal Berkshire, UK: Spottiswoode Ballantyne. OCLC 933101105.
- Pevsner, Nikolaus; Williamson, Elizabeth (2003). Buckinghamshire. The Buildings of England. New Haven US & London, UK: Yale University Press. ISBN 9780300095845.
- Sheahan, James Joseph (1862). History and topography of Buckinghamshire: comprising a general survey of the county, preceded by an epitome of the early history of Great Britain. London: Longman, Green, Longman, and Roberts. ISBN 978-0-8048-3390-5.
