= The Souls =

Elite social and intellectual group in UK

The Wyndham Sisters, by John Singer Sargent, 1899 (Metropolitan Museum)

The Souls was a small loosely-knit but distinctive elite social and intellectual group in the United Kingdom from 1885 to the turn of the century. Many of the most distinguished British politicians and intellectuals of the time were members. The original group of Souls reached its zenith in the early 1890s and had faded out as a coherent clique by 1900.

== Formation ==
The group formed as a response to the damper on social life caused by the political tension of the Irish Home Rule debate. Existing social circles were rent by angry arguments between proponents and opponents of the Gladstone ministry's efforts in 1886 to bring about full Home Rule. Many people in society wanted a salon where they could meet without fighting about politics. Wilfrid Scawen Blunt, a member of the group, described the aims and objectives of The Souls, and above all, of what they wanted to avoid.

In my disappointment about Egypt I turned with redoubled zest to my social pleasures of the year before, and at this time saw much of that interesting group of clever men and pretty women known as the Souls, than whom no section of London Society was better worth frequenting, including as it did all that there was most intellectually amusing and least conventional. It was a group of men and women bent on pleasure, but pleasure of a superior kind, eschewing the vulgarities of racing and card-playing indulged in by the majority of the rich and noble, and looking for their excitement in romance and sentiment.

The name reportedly came from Lord Charles Beresford, who said: "You all sit and talk about each other's souls—I shall call you the 'Souls'".

== Members ==
The original Souls included the following people.

=== The Balfours ===
- Arthur Balfour (1848–1930), Prime Minister of the United Kingdom, 1902–1905
- Edith Sophy Balfour (1865–1948), who was Alfred Lyttelton's second wife. A novelist, playwright, World War I-era activist, and Justice of the Peace, in August 1917 she was among the first people honoured with the Order of the British Empire by King George V, for her work with refugees.

=== The Wyndhams ===
Percy Wyndham, his wife, Madeline Caroline Frances Eden Campbell, their two sons and three daughters and the children's spouses were all original members of The Souls. Through their mother, the children were descended from Irish nationalist Lord Edward FitzGerald. Wyndham commissioned the now-famous painting of his daughters, The Wyndham Sisters by John Singer Sargent. The trio are the centre of the 2014 book Those Wild Wyndhams by Claudia Renton.

- Hon. Percy Scawen Wyndham (1835–1911) was a soldier, Conservative Party politician, collector and intellectual. He held the same seat in Parliament from 1860 to 1885.
- Madeline Caroline Frances Eden Campbell Wyndham, (1846–1920) married the Hon. Percy Scawen Wyndham in 1860. Through her, their children were descended from Irish nationalist Lord Edward FitzGerald.
- George Wyndham, (1863–1913), the Wyndhams' elder son, served in the Coldstream Guards, became private secretary to Arthur Balfour and in 1889, was elected unopposed to a seat in the House of Commons that he held until his death in 1913. He served as Under-Secretary of State for War, Chief Secretary for Ireland, and then was taken into the Cabinet and sworn a member of the Privy Council in 1902. He furthered the 1902 Land Conference and saw the transformative Land Purchase (Ireland) Act 1903 into law. Within years of the Acts, former tenants owned most of the land, thanks to support from government subsidies.
- Guy Percy Wyndham (1865–1941), the Wyndham's second son, was an officer in the British army
- Madeline Pamela Constance Blanche Wyndham, (1869–1941), the Wyndham's second daughter, married British Army officer Charles Adeane. After retiring from the Army, he was Justice of the Peace and Lord Lieutenant of Cambridgeshire from 1915 until his death in 1943. In 1917, he was appointed President of the Royal Agricultural Society. The couple had seven children, two sons and five daughters. Their eldest daughter, Pamela, was the mother of professional jazz musician and broadcaster Humphrey Richard Adeane Lyttelton, also known as Humph.
- Pamela Adelaide Genevieve Wyndham Glenconner Grey (1871–1928), the senior Wyndhams' youngest child, was an author and editor. In 1919, Wyndham published Edward Wyndham Tennant: Memoirs of his Mother... her memories of her war-poet son, killed on the Somme in 1916. She published poems, prose and children's literature, and edited poetry and prose anthologies. She numbered among her friends Henry James, Oscar Wilde, Edward Burne-Jones, and Edith Olivier. Her first husband was Margot Asquith's brother, Edward Tennant, 1st Baron Glenconner. They had five children, including Stephen Tennant (1906–1987), known as the brightest of the Bright Young Things of 1920s London, and his elder brother, David Tennant (1902–1968) who founded the Gargoyle Club in Soho in 1925. Her second marriage, in 1922, to the eminent British Liberal statesman Sir Edward Grey, 1st Viscount Grey of Fallodon, had no issue.
- Mary Constance Charteris, Lady Elcho (1862–1937), eldest daughter of Percy and Madeline Wyndham. She married Hugo Charteris, Lord Elcho, in 1883. They had seven children. One son died very young. Their eldest son, Captain Hugo Francis Charteris, Lord Elcho, married Lady Violet Catherine Manners, the daughter of Violet Manners, Duchess of Rutland (see below) and Henry Manners, 8th Duke of Rutland, in 1911. He and his brother Yvo Alan Charteris, were killed in action during the Great War. Their eldest daughter, Lady Cynthia Mary Evelyn Charteris, a prolific writer, married poet Herbert Asquith, second son of Prime Minister H. H. Asquith. Their youngest child, Lady Irene Corona Charteris, married Ivor Windsor-Clive, 2nd Earl of Plymouth, son of Robert and Alberta Windsor-Clive, also members of The Souls.

=== The Custs ===
- Henry "Harry" Cust (1861–1917) served as a Member of Parliament for the Unionist Party, as Justice of the Peace for Bedfordshire, as Deputy Lieutenant of Bedfordshire, and as Justice of the Peace for Lincolnshire. He had a reputation as a brilliant conversationalist and a philanderer. Violet Manners, Duchess of Rutland, was his mistress, and her daughter, Lady Diana Cooper, née Manners, was his child. In 1892, William Waldorf Astor invited Cust to edit the Pall Mall Gazette. He made it the best evening journal of the period, in part by enlisting such contributors as Rudyard Kipling and H. G. Wells. Cust rejected Astor's own submissions and disagreed with his politics: Astor dismissed him in February 1896. Among Cust's own works is the poem "Non nobis ". During World War I, Cust was active in propaganda on behalf of the British Government. In August 1914 he founded the Central Committee for National Patriotic Organizations. He married 'Nina' Welby in 1893.
- Emmeline 'Nina' Mary Elizabeth Welby (1867–1955), was an English writer, editor, translator and sculptor. She married fellow Soul Harry Cust in 1893. She aided him in much of his work, as when she helped with correspondence for the Central Committee for National Patriotic Organisations.

=== The Grenfells ===
- William Grenfell, 1st Baron Desborough (1855–1945) was a British athlete, sportsman, public servant and politician. Desborough was appointed Commander of the Royal Victorian Order in 1907, advancing to Knight Commander in 1908 and Knight Grand Cross in 1925. In 1928, he was admitted as a Knight of the Order of the Garter. He sat in the House of Commons from 1880 to 1905, when he was raised to the peerage. He was President of the Thames Conservancy Board from 1904 to 1937. He served with the London Chamber of Commerce, the Royal Agricultural Society, was a steward of Henley Royal Regatta, served as a Justice of the Peace and a Deputy Lieutenant. In 1919, the Desborough Committee investigated the causes of the London Police Strike of August 1918. Its recommendations resulted in the enactment of the influential Police Act 1919. He was President of the Central Association of Volunteer Training Corps, a voluntary home-defence militia, from November 1914 until it was disbanded in 1920. From 1924 to 1929 he was Captain of the Queen's Bodyguard of the Yeomen of the Guard. From 1919 to 1929 he was chairman of the Pilgrims of Great Britain. He planned and oversaw the construction of the Desborough Cut, an artificial navigation channel on the River Thames, which was opened in 1935. He married Ethel "Ettie" Fane in 1887. (See below.) They had three sons and two daughters. Their eldest son, the poet Julian Grenfell, was killed in action in 1915. Their second son, Gerald William Grenfell, was killed about two months later. Their third son, Ivo George Grenfell, died in 1926 after a car accident. With no surviving male heirs the barony became extinct after Grenfell's death.
- Ethel 'Ettie' Grenfell, née Fane, Lady Desborough (1867–1952) was the daughter of the Hon. Julian Fane, a diplomat and poet, the fifth and youngest son of John Fane, 11th Earl of Westmorland, and Lady Adine Eliza Anne Cowper, daughter of George Cowper, 6th Earl Cowper. Lady Adine died in 1868, a few months after the birth of a son (who did not live to adulthood). Fane died in 1870, leaving Ettie an orphan. She was 20 years old when she married William Grenfell. They welcomed gatherings of The Souls and many others to Taplow Court. Lady Desborough was a well-known celebrity and hostess whose guest lists included Henry Irving, Vita Sackville-West, Edward VII when Prince of Wales, H. G. Wells, Patrick Shaw Stewart, Edith Wharton, Oscar Wilde and Winston Churchill. From 1911 on, Ettie served periodically as Lady of the Bedchamber to Mary of Teck, Queen Consort to George V. She was said to be the confidante of six Prime Ministers: Rosebery, Balfour, Asquith, Baldwin, Chamberlain and Churchill. The Grenfells' lives were marked by the loss of all three sons, two in the Great War and one in an automobile accident in 1926. In 1915, their son Julian was fatally wounded when a splinter from an exploding shell landed in his brain. Ettie received the news from their daughter, who was serving as a nurse in France. Ettie and William travelled to Boulogne, France to be with their son. It took Julian 13 days to die, with his mother, father and sister at his side.

=== The Windsor-Clives ===
- Robert Windsor-Clive, 1st Earl of Plymouth (1857–1923), was a Conservative politician. He was the founding President of the London Society.
- Alberta Victoria Sarah Caroline Windsor-Clive, née Paget, Countess of Plymouth (1863–1944), his wife.

=== Others ===
- George Curzon, 1st Marquess Curzon of Kedleston (1859–1925), Viceroy of India 1899–1905
- Margot Asquith, née Tennant (1864–1945): a British socialite, author, and wit, she married H. H. Asquith, Prime Minister of the United Kingdom, in 1894 and became Countess of Oxford and Asquith in 1925 when her husband was granted a peerage.
- Laura Tennant, Margot's sister (1862–1886), who married Alfred Lyttelton in 1885 and died a year later giving birth to their son (who died in 1888).
- Lucy Graham Smith, another of Margot's sisters (1860–1942), who lived in Easton Grey House (Wiltshire) and later Sindlesham House (Berkshire).
- St. John Brodrick (1856–1942): a Conservative and Irish Unionist Alliance politician, he served in many important positions and was sworn into the Privy Council in 1897. At his father's death in 1907, he became 9th Viscount Midleton. In the 1920 New Year Honours he was made 1st Earl of Midleton.
- Hugo Richard Charteris, Lord Elcho (1857–1937) was a Scottish Conservative politician. He married Mary Constance Wyndham in 1883, They had seven children. Hugo was the fifth son, but by 1914 he was the eldest survivor, and he succeeded his father, becoming the 11th Earl of Wemyss and the 7th Earl of March. He served as Lord-Lieutenant of Haddingtonshire from 1918 to 1937.
- Alfred Lyttelton (1857–1913): the 12th child of the 4th Baron Lyttelton, he displayed versatility at sport, excelling at both football and cricket. Lyttelton took up the law. He married Laura Tennant in 1885. She died in 1886, bringing their son into the world. The child died in 1888. In 1892, he married Edith Sophy Balfour. In 1895, he was elected to the House of Commons as a Liberal Unionist. In 1900 he was appointed Queen's Counsel and was sent to South Africa as chairman of the committee planning reconstruction following the Boer War. He served as Colonial Secretary from 1903 to 1905.
- Henry White, U.S. diplomat (1850–1927) and his wife, Margaret Stuyvesant Rutherfurd 'Daisey' White.
- Violet Manners, Duchess of Rutland (1856–1937).

== The Coterie ==
The Coterie, often considered to be the second generation of The Souls, was a celebrated group of intellectuals, a mix of aristocrats, politicians and art-lovers, most of whom were killed in the First World War. There were children of The Souls among them, notably Lady Diana Manners, daughter of Violet Manners, Duchess of Rutland. Officially the youngest daughter of the 8th Duke of Rutland, she was in fact the daughter of Harry Cust. She married one of the Coterie's few survivors, Duff Cooper, later British Ambassador to France. After his death, she wrote three volumes of memoirs. Raymond Asquith, eldest son of Prime Minister H. H. Asquith, was a member of the Coterie, but not out of sympathy with his stepmother, Margot Tennant Asquith. He was killed on the Somme.
