= Hugh Salmon =

British playwright

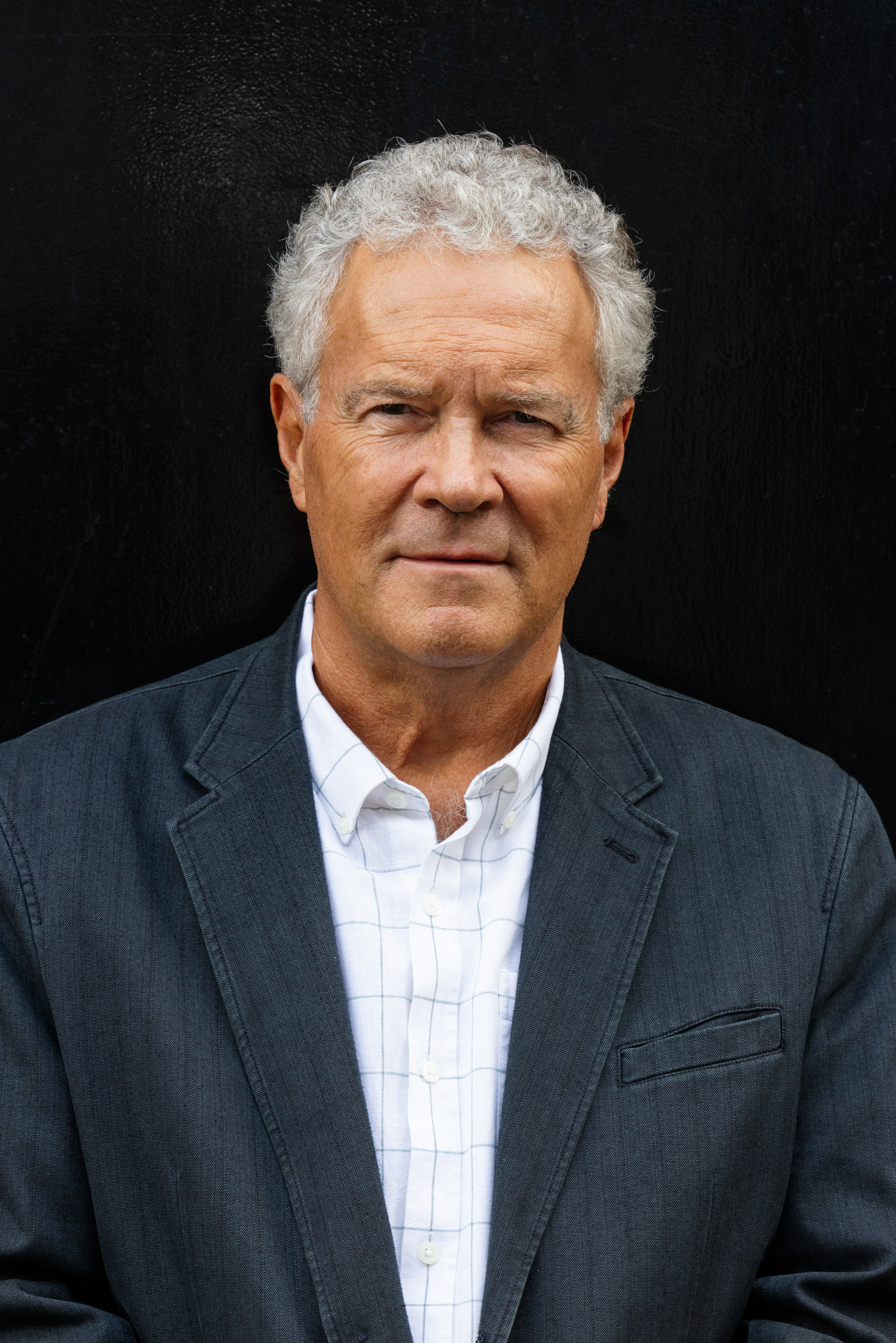
Hugh Salmon, photographed for promotion of his play Into Battle, at Greenwich Theatre, London, UK; photographed at Abacus Arts, London, UK; 15 September 2021. Credit: Ellie Kurttz / ArenaPAL; www.arenapal.com Commercial licence can be obtained from www.arenapal.com

Hugh Salmon is a British advertising executive and playwright, who wrote the play Into Battle.

== Early career ==
As the creator of SFX Cassette Magazine, the music magazine on audio cassette launched in 1982, Salmon pursued a career in advertising, media and marketing. Between 1988 and 1991, he was appointed to manage the Ogilvy (agency) office in Thailand, Ogilvy's fourth largest agency in the world. He later became managing director of CM:Lintas in London, and was in a five-year legal dispute (Hugh Salmon v Lintas Worldwide) to clear his name following accusations by the agency, which were eventually dropped by Lintas. The case was closed when Salmon was awarded significant damages and Lintas made a formal apology.

He is the son of Gerald Mordaunt Broome Salmon and the brother of rugby player, Jamie Salmon.

== Into Battle ==
His stage play Into Battle received its premiere at the Greenwich Theatre in London in October 2021.

The play tells the story of a bitter feud between the privileged Old Etonians at Balliol College, Oxford and a more socially aware group of non-Etonians during the run-up to the First World War. Among its cast of characters are Ettie Grenfell, Baroness Desborough, war poets, Julian Grenfell and Patrick Shaw-Stewart, Rev. Neville Talbot, England rugby captain, Ronald Poulton and Keith Rae grandson of George Rae.

== Legal dispute ==
Hugh Salmon v Lintas Worldwide was a lawsuit brought by the British advertising executive Hugh Salmon against his former employer, the advertising agency Lintas Worldwide and its holding company, The Interpublic Group of Companies. After Salmon discovered financial irregularities at the company, he was fired. He sued the company for malicious falsehood and punitive damages, and he ultimately prevailed.

In 1992, Hugh Salmon was appointed by Lintas Worldwide as managing director of its London subsidiary CM Lintas, and soon discovered financial irregularities at the agency. However, before Salmon reported his findings to the holding company, The Interpublic Group of Companies in New York, Chris Munds, Chairman of CM Lintas, made serious allegations about Salmon's performance and competence, resulting in Salmon's summary dismissal.

Believing that he had been the victim of a cover-up and was fired under false pretenses to cover up fraudulent financial activity, Salmon sued for malicious falsehood and punitive damages, and it took him five years to prove that he was the innocent party. Following the case, Management Today published a piece by Matthew Lynn entitled "The whistleblower's dilemma" in which he looks into the difficulties employees face when whistleblowing and holding their colleagues to account.

== Books ==
- 2012 – Do as You Would Be Done By
- 2016 – Thoughts on Life and Advertising
- 2017 – Ideas for Britain
- 2025 – The Faintest of Tickles - a new anthology of cricket writing with a Foreword by Daniel Norcross
