= Lady Amabel Kerr =

British writer (1846–1906)

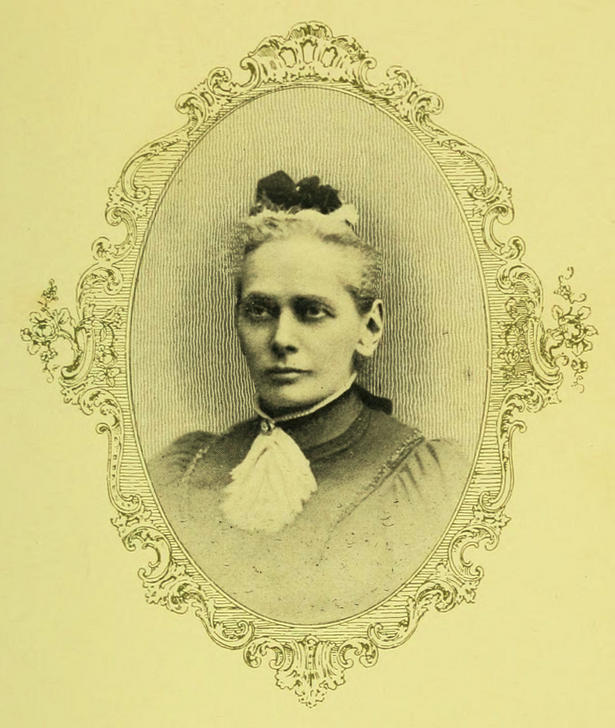
- Photo in A Round table of the representative Irish and English Catholic novelists, 1897
- Born: Lady Amabel Frederica Henrietta Cowper; 24 March 1846; St George Hanover Square, London, England
- Died: 15 October 1906 (aged 60); Melbourne, Derbyshire, England
- Resting place: St. David's Churchyard, Dalkeith, Midlothian, Scotland
- Occupations: writer; editor
- Spouse: Lord Walter Kerr (m. 1873)
- Parents: George Cowper, 6th Earl Cowper; Lady Anne Florence de Grey
- Relatives: Thomas de Grey, 2nd Earl de Grey (grandfather); Francis Thomas de Grey Cowper, 7th Earl Cowper & The Honourable Henry Frederick Cowper (brothers); the Honourable Auberon Herbert & the Honourable Julian Fane (brothers-in-law); George Robinson, Marquis of Ripon (cousin)
- Writing career
- Language: English
- Genres: biographies; devotional literature; children's literature; novels

Signature
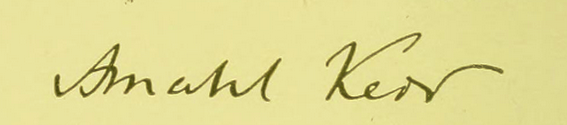

Lady Amabel Frederica Henrietta Kerr (née Cowper; 24 March 1846 – 15 October 1906) was a British aristocrat and writer of religious literature, biographies, children's literature, and novels. She was also a translator from German to English, and a magazine editor. She was described in the University of Ottawa Review as "a rare example of strenuous devotion to the service of God and His Church, rendered all the more forcible by reason of the obscurity in which she endeavored to shroud her work". Kerr was the author of a number of books, among them: Unravelled Convictions, being the reasons for her conversion; Before Our Lord Came, an Old Testament history for little children; A Mixed Marriage, a novel; Life of Joan of Arc, and Life of Blessed Sebastian Valfre. She died in October 1906. (Note: The Catholic who's who (1908) recorded her year of death as 1905.)

== Early life ==
Lady Amabel Frederica Henrietta Cowper was born in St George Hanover Square, London, England, 1846. Her father was George Cowper, 6th Earl Cowper, her mother Lady Anne Florence de Grey (who after her husband's death succeeded as sixth Baroness Lucas of Crudwell), daughter of Thomas de Grey, 2nd Earl de Grey. Her siblings were:

- Lady Henrietta Emily Mary Cowper (d. 1853)
- Francis Thomas de Grey Cowper, 7th Earl Cowper (1834–1905)
- The Honourable Henry Frederick Cowper (1836–1887)
- Lady Florence Amabel Cowper (1837–1886), married the Honourable Auberon Herbert in 1871.
- Lady Adine Eliza Anne Cowper (1840–1868), married the Honourable Julian Fane in 1866.

== Career ==
While still a girl, and before her conversion, she started her literary career with a journal, afterward published with the title Unravelled Convictions, in which she recorded the various mental stages through which she was led through many doubts and bewilderments to find peace and rest in the Catholic Church. It was an instructive history of her feelings and convictions up to November 1868. Thirty years afterward, it was republished in a second edition by the Catholic Truth Society.

She was received into the Catholic Church in 1872, and the following year married Lord Walter Kerr, later Admiral of the Fleet. After her conversion, Lady Amabel was constantly publishing what might serve for instruction or edification. In particular, she was a most strenuous and efficient member of the Catholic Truth Society, a regular attendant at its committee meetings, and one of the most prolific contributors to its literature, most of her work being done for it.

To begin with, she did much to spread amongst Catholics a knowledge of the Bible story by her most successful small volumes, Before Our Lord Came (Old Testament history for young children), Bible Picture Book for Catholic Children, and Life of Our Lord. Of many saints and holy persons, she likewise wrote lives — some on a larger scale as substantial books, others in outline as penny tracts. Of the former class, there were B. Sebastian Valfre; Monsignore Cacciaguerra ("A Precursor of St. Philip"); Joan of Arc; B. Anthony Grassi ("A Saint of the Oratory"); St. Felix of Cantalice ("A Son of St. Francis"); and Sister Chatelain; or, Forty Years' Work in Westminster. The shorter biographies include those of St. Martin, St. Elizabeth of Hungary, St. Thomas Aquinas, St. Francis Xavier, St. Philip Benizi, Mother Mary Hallahan, and two who commenced life as French naval officers, and a tribute to whom came from Lady Amabel, the wife of a British Admiral; they were Alexis Clerc, and Auguste Marceau.

To devotional literature, Lady Amabel was also a considerable contributor. From the German of Father Maurice Meschler, S.J., she translated The Gift of Pentecost (meditations on the Holy Ghost), and from the letters of François Fénelon, she selected a volume which she entitled Spiritual Counsels. In fiction, too, she produced two stories which achieved some success, despite a purpose. These appeared originally under the titles, A Mixed Marriage and One Woman's Work, the latter being altered when the tale was published separately to The Whole Difference.

Besides all these various productions, Lady Amabel edited the Catholic Magazine, the organ of the Catholic Truth Society, established in 1895, during the greater part of its career, and was on the committee of the Society.

The translation from German to English of Dr. Ludwig Pastor's History of the Popes (1908) was a massive work of which the volume comprising Leo X's pontificate was taken up by Lady Amabel, and she had almost completed the work when in the autumn of 1906, she died.

== Personal life ==
In 1903, it was reported that Lady Amabel was one of the co-heirs to the barony of Butler, other coheirs to the same barony being Mr. Auberon Herbert and Mrs. W. H. Grenfell. As Lady Amabel's brother, Lord Cowper, 7th Earl Cowper, died childless and there were no other male-line descendants of the first Earl Cowper at the time of his death, his wealth stated mainly devolved to issue of his three married sisters. Amabel's descendants, who later succeeded as Marquesses of Lothian, inherited the Melbourne part of the Cowper estates including Brocket Hall in Hertfordshire and Melbourne Hall in Derbyshire.

George Robinson, Marquis of Ripon was her cousin.

Lady Amabel Kerr died at Melbourne, Derbyshire, England, 15 October 1906, and was buried at St. David's Churchyard, Dalkeith, Midlothian, Scotland.

== Selected works ==
- Unravelled convictions; or 'My road to faith', 1878
- A Mixed Marriage, 1893
- Auguste Marceau, a sailor's life, 1893
- Alexis Clerc, Sailor and Jesuit (1819–1871.)., 1893
- Blessed Margaret Mary, 1895
- Mother Margaret Hallahan (1803–1868), 1896
- The Life of the Blessed Sebastian Valfré of the Turin Oratory, 1896
- Unravelled Convictions ... Second Edition, 1897
- The Life of Cesare Cardinal Baronius of the Roman Oratory, 1898
- A Bible Picture Book for Catholic Children, 1898
- Saint Martin (317–397.), 1899
- Sister Chatelain: Or, Forty Years' Work in Westminster., 1900
- A Life of Our Lord, 1900
- A Son of St. Francis. St. Felix of Cantalice, 1900
- A Saint of the Oratory: The Life of Blessed Antony Grassi of the Fermo Congregation, 1901
- St. Elizabeth of Hungary, 1207–1231, 1901
- Saint Cecilia, 1902
- The whole difference, 1902
- Saint Philip Benizi, 1902
- Jeanne d'Arc, glorifiée par une anglaise, 1903
- A precursor of st. Philip, Buonsignore Cacciaguerra
- Lives of the Saints for Children: 2nd Series, 1905
- Saint Francis Xavier, 1905
- Saint Thomas Aquinas, 1905
- Saint Genevieve, 1906
- Saint Francis of Assisi, 1906
- St. Thomas of Canterbury, 1906
- Christopher Columbus, 1908
- Saint Philip Benizi (1233–1285), 1908
