= Iain Fletcher =

British actor (born 1966)

Iain Fletcher (born 23 August 1966) is a British actor, known for his role as DC Rod Skase in the ITV drama series The Bill. He portrayed the character for six years from 1994.

Other television credits include Band of Brothers, Murphy's Law, Family Affairs, Holby City, Waterloo Road, Casualty, Doctors as Gary Lucas and EastEnders as Councillor Barker.

Stage credits include Sam Carmichael in the musical Mamma Mia! in the West End, and Bill Sikes in Cameron Mackintosh's production of Oliver!. He also played the King in The Three Musketeers at Rose Theatre Kingston. In 2021, he was in Hugh Salmon's Into Battle play at Greenwich Theatre.

== Filmography ==
=== Film ===
Year	Title	Role	Notes
2005	The Forgotten Hit	Jacobs	Short
2025	Fuze	General Minton	

=== Television ===
Year	Title	Role	Notes
1994–2000	The Bill	DC Rod Skase	TV series: 261 episodes
2001	Band of Brothers	Bernard J. (Doc) Ryan	TV mini-series: 1 episode
2002	Family Affairs	Johnny Palmer	TV series: 14 episodes
2001–2013	Holby City	Mark Edwards / Iain Bain / Russell Jones	TV series: 3 episodes
2004	The Impressionable Jon Culshaw	DC Rod Skase	TV series: 1 episode
2005–2009	Casualty	Alan / Fire Officer Iain Bain	TV series: 5 episodes
2005–2023	Doctors	Gary Lucas / Richard Longley / Mark Dunham	TV series: 12 episodes
2005	Murphy's Law	Deakin	TV series: 1 episode
2005	Casualty@Holby City	Fire Officer	TV series: 1 episode
2014	Waterloo Road	Declan Pierce	TV series: 1 episode
2015	Armada: 12 Days to Save England	Sir Francis Drake	TV mini-series: 3 episodes
2016–2025	EastEnders	Councillor Donald Barker / DS Tony Evers	TV series: 7 episodes
2023	Slow Horses	Chauffeur	TV series: 1 episode
2024	Silent Witness	Martin Piler	TV series: 2 episodes
2024	Say Nothing	Governor	TV mini-series: 1 episode
