= Sindlesham Court =

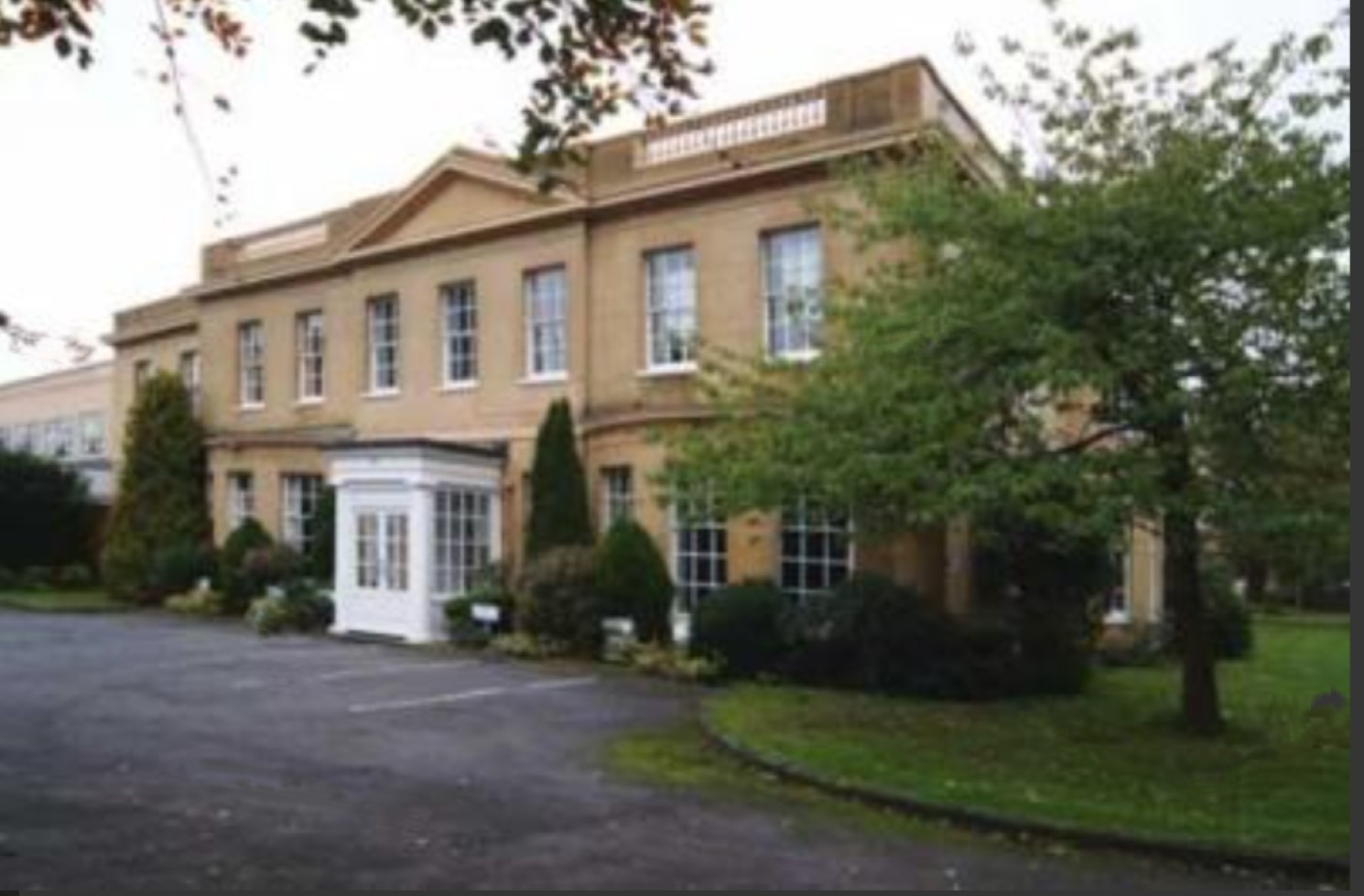
- Interactive map of the Sindlesham Court area
- Former names: Sinsom Lodge, Sindlesham Lodge, Sindlesham House

General information
- Type: Country house
- Classification: Grade II listed
- Location: Near Wokingham, Berkshire, England
- Coordinates: 51.42185°N 0.88835°W
- Current tenants: Provincial Grand Lodge of Freemasons of Berkshire
- Year built: Before 1760

Design and construction
- Known for: Historical significance

Website
- www.facebook.com/SindleshamCourt/

Sindlesham Court, near Wokingham, is a building of historical significance and is Grade II listed (as Berkshire Masonic Centre) on the English Heritage Register. It was built before 1760, as it is shown on Rocque's Map of 1761. It was the home of several notable residents over the next two centuries. Today it is a venue for weddings, conferences and special events.

== Early residents ==
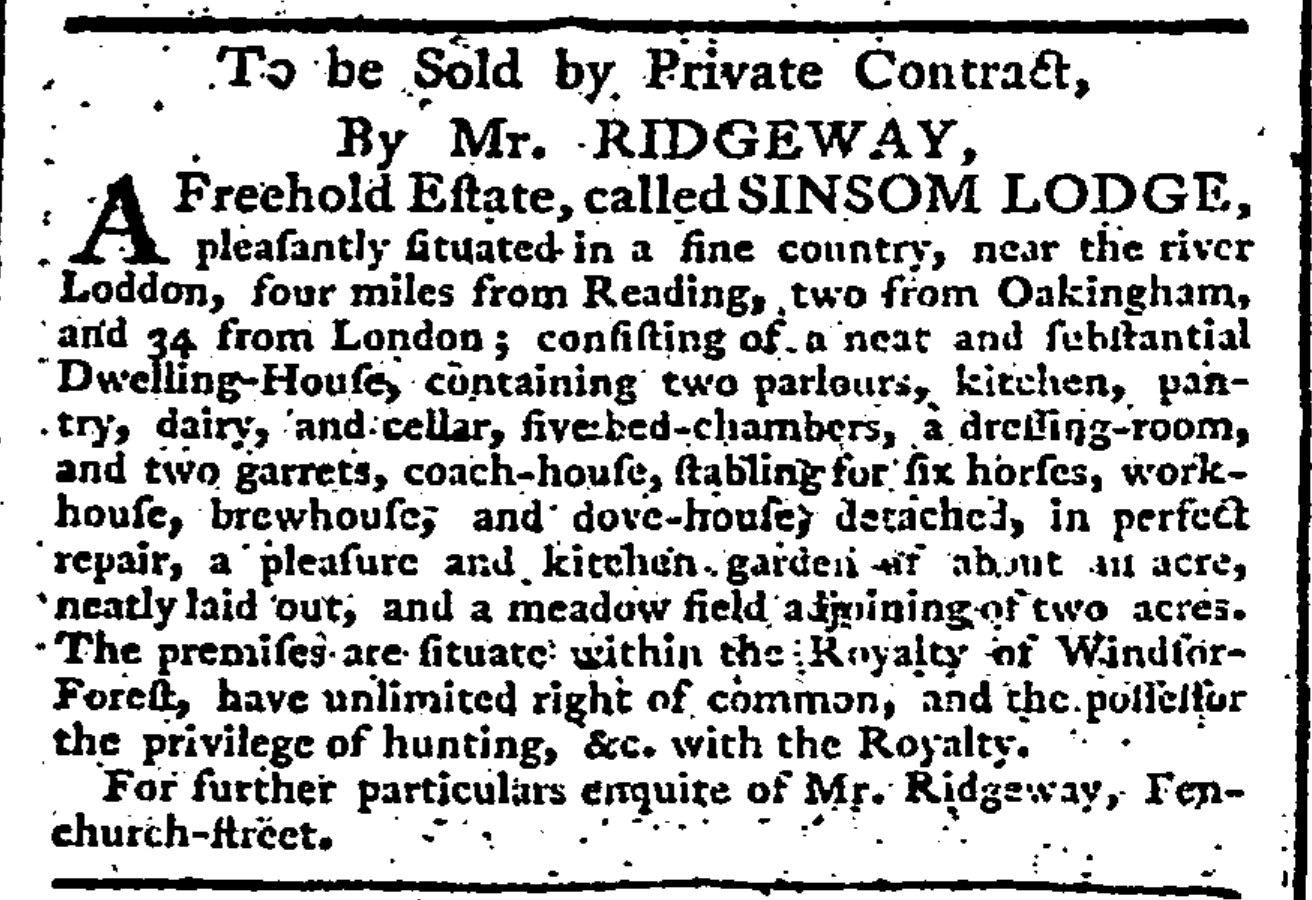
Advertisement for the sale of the house in 1777

The house is known to have existed before 1760 because it is shown on John Rocque's map of 1761. Around this time Sindlesham was also called Sinsom. An advertisement for the house in 1777, then called Sinsom Lodge, describes a substantial house with two parlours and five bedrooms as well as numerous outbuildings.

One of the early owners was Captain Eyre Evans Crowe (1730–1804) who bought the house in 1784 and later called it Sindlesham Lodge. He came from a distinguished family and was the cousin of Sir Eyre Coote, with whom he served in the 84th Regiment of Foot. He retired in 1784 and became a partner in the first Reading Bank with two other notable figures; the venture was not a success and he was forced to sell most of his property to repay the losses. He died at Sindlesham in 1804 and the house seems to have been purchased by the Forbes family. Their daughter Jane Forbes (1791–1826) married Thomas Rickman Harman in 1810 and the house came to the Harman family. It was owned by them for the next hundred years.

== Later owners ==
Thomas Rickman Harman (1780–1866) was a wealthy stockbroker and landowner from London, who owned a house in Bloomsbury and acquired other properties. He and Jane had six children – three sons and three daughters. When he died in 1866 his son also called Thomas Rickman Harman (1821–1913) inherited the house. By this time the name of the house had changed from Sindlesham Lodge to Sindlesham House.

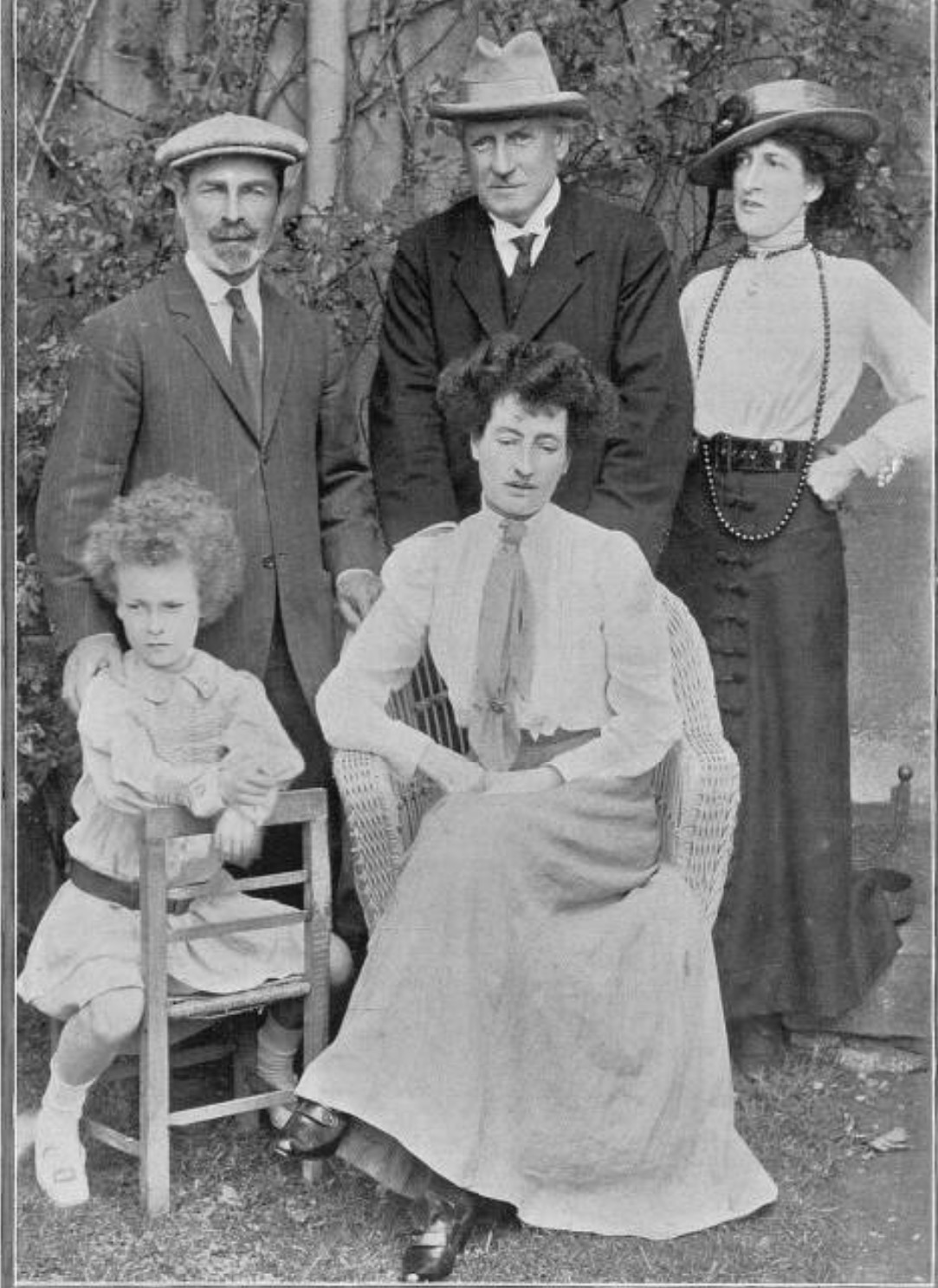
Mrs Graham Smith (seated on the right) with Lord Asquith (standing behind her) and Lady Margot Asquith (standing on the far right)

Thomas Rickman Harman (1821–1913) was born in 1821 in Sindlesham. He also became a stockbroker in London and had large landholdings. In 1872 he married Emily Mary Purvis (1831–1891), daughter of Reverend Richard Fortesque Purvis. The couple had no children. The Census of 1881 records them with a ladies' maid, a cook, three housemaids and a groom. After Emily died in 1891 Thomas's two unmarried sisters Fanny and Mary Harman came to live with him. Mary died in 1908 at the age of 83, and Fanny in 1911 at the age of 94. Thomas died in 1913 at the age of 92 and as he had no children he left the house to his niece Mary Jane Betton Foster (1846–1947). She lived there until about 1920 and then appears to have rented it to wealthy tenants.

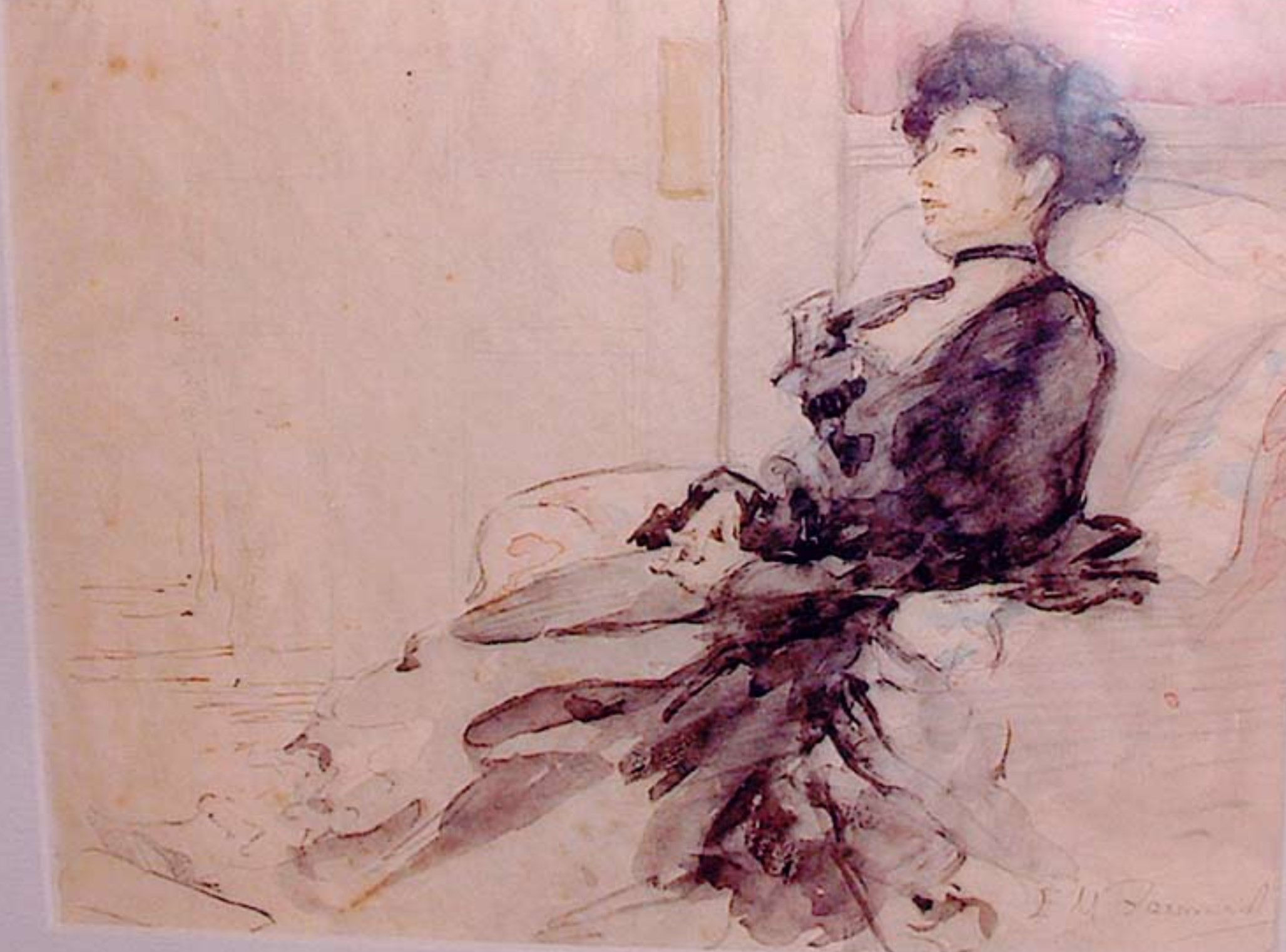
Portrait of Lucy Graham Smith by Elinor Barnard

In 1928 Lucy Graham Smith (1860–1942) bought the house. Her father was Sir Charles Tennant, 1st Baronet, and her younger sister Margot married the future the Prime Minister Lord Asquith. In 1879, Lucy had married Thomas Graham Smith who owned Easton Grey House in Wiltshire. The couple had no children. She was a talented watercolour painter and one of her pictures is in the National Portrait Gallery. Her friend Elinor Barnard, another artist, painted her portrait.

Lucy was a member of an elite social set called "The Souls" which included four of the Tennant sisters, Prime Minister Arthur Balfour, Lord Curzon (Viceroy of India), Lady Desborough and other notables of London society. A book was written about them and their social activities; the Tennant sisters are described in the following terms:

"The four famous Tennant daughters are best known under their married names: Lady Ribblesdale, Mrs Graham Smith, Laura Lyttelton and Margot Asquith. Lady Frances Balfour described them as 'a family highly gifted, of totally unconventional manners, with no code of behaviour except their own good hearts'. Their entry into London society was lively; indeed, in the instance of the youngest Margot, a vivid assault. They were all renowned for a quality frequently praised by Margot, "social courage"; and all were supported morally, socially and financially by their bountiful father, whose generous dowries in the American style made possible their marriages to eligible but impecunious husbands."

Lucy's husband Thomas died in 1908, and she continued to live at Easton Grey House until 1928 when she bought Sindlesham House, where she remained until her death in 1942. As she had no children, she left the house to her nephew Anthony Asquith who is the child in the above photo. It was used during the war by Miles Aircraft as a hostel and training centre.

In 1948 the property was sold to the Salvatorians who added buildings and used it for students who were training for the priesthood. In 1967 it was sold to the current owners, the Provincial Grand Lodge of Freemasons of Berkshire.
