= SFX Cassette Magazine =

SFX Cassette Magazine was a short-lived British music magazine published in the early 1980s. Rather being a traditional print media magazine, SFX was distributed in the form of a one-hour cassette. Magazines were sold as cassettes twist-tied to an A4-size cardboard backing.

The format of each issue was similar to a radio show, featuring news and interviews with pop stars (mostly but not exclusively British) and others involved with the music industry; reviews of record releases given by other musicians and artists; previews of upcoming album releases; unsigned band demo recordings; occasional features on culture, fashion and football (soccer); and three or four commercials per issue.

Despite promoting itself as ‘The only music magazine on a C-60 cassette’, both Fast Forward, (first available in 1980), and Soundwave Magazine predated it.

The concept was conceived and developed by Hugh Salmon, then an account executive at Ogilvy & Mather, and edited by the NME journalist Max Bell. Notable interviews included Paul McCartney talking for the first time about his feelings of the murder of John Lennon, and SFX provided the first opportunity for Jools Holland, keyboard player of the band Squeeze, and Paula Yates talking about her relationship with Bob Geldof. They both went on to present the TV programme The Tube.

The publication was short lived, running from November 1981 through the summer of 1982. There were 19 issues published, with the publication closing due to production costs.

== List of issues ==
| Issue # | Date | Contents |
|---|---|---|
| 1 | 21 Nov 1981 | Madness, Linx, Spandau Ballet, Bow Wow Wow, Soft Cell, Neil Young, Human League & more. |
| 2 | 5 Dec 1981 | Adam & The Ants, Ian Dury, Bad Manners, Haircut 100, Kim Wilde, ABC, Eurythmics, Virna Lindt, Annabella's Mum & more. |
| 3 | 19 Dec 1981 - 7 Jan 1982 | Sting, Stray Cats, Julian Cope, The Beat's Dave Wakeling, Rat Scabies, Lemmy, Kid Creole, Nona Hendryx, Belle Stars Rap & more. |
| 4 | 9-21 Jan 1982 | Human League, Depeche Mode, OMD, Steve Strange, James Brown, A&R Men & more. |
| 5 | 23 Jan - 4 Feb 1982 | Phil Collins, Duran Duran, Pretenders, Heaven 17, Richard O'Brien, 'Mac' Reviews Records with Mr & Mrs Suggs, Bill Nelson with Richard Jobson & more. |
| 6 | 6-18 Feb 1982 | Paul Weller, Ultravox, Pete Shelley, The Mobiles, Killing Joke, Blancmange, UB 40, XTC, Panther Burns, Jimmy Riley, Black Uhuru & more. |
| 7 | Feb 20 - March 4, 1982 | Gary Kemp, Sophisticated Boom Boom, Billy Connoly, Teddy Pendergrass, Buggles, B-52s, Lou Reed, Gary Numan, Modern Romance & more. |
| 8 | March 6–18, 1982 | Hugh Cornwell, Hall & Oates, Holger Czukay, Alice Cooper, Nick Lowe, Four Tops, The Waitresses, Alexei Sayle, XTC & more. |
| 9 | Mar 20 - April 1, 1982 | Lou Reed, Wah!, Haircut 100, The Rap, Bill Wyman, The Questions, The Jam, Dave Edmunds, Tank, Steel Pulse, Pigbag, Apocalypse, Toni Basil & more. |
| 10 | April 3–15, 1982 | Terry Hall (Fun Boy 3), Glenn Hodle & Ossie Ardiles, Thompson Twins, The Associates, The Secret Policeman's Other Ball, J. J. Cale, The Fall, B.E.F., Kirk Brandon, Venigmas, My Silent War, Troops For Tomorrow, Fair Deal & more. |
| 11 | April 17–29, 1982 | Bob Geldof, Paul McCartney (Part 1), The Impossible Dreamers, Talking Heads, Visage, Graham Parker, Dragon Slayer (Brian Johnson), Dollar's Thereza, Vic Godard, Maze & more. |
| 12 | May 1–13, 1982 | Sandie Shaw, Paul McCartney (Part 2), Belle Stars, Bananarama, Swan's Way, Blondie, Squeeze, Junior Giscombe, Hank on Ry, Jim Kerr, Girlschool, Gil Scott-Heron & more. |
| 13 | May 15–27, 1982 | Meat Loaf, Adam Ant, Steve Davis, King Trigger, Culture Club, The Group, Lemmy, David Grant, Clash, Bucks Fizz, Gang Of Four, Thomas Dolby, Paul Simon, James King & more. |
| 14 | May 29 - June 10, 1982 | Altered Images, Echo & The Bunnymen, Bart, Queen, Kid Creole, John Hiatt, Michael Palin, Saxon, Paula Yates, Duran Duran & more. |
| 15 | June 12–24, 1982 | Queen, Yazoo, Pete Townshend, Endgames, Still Life, Roxy Music, Modern English, Gwen Guthrie, Todd Rundgren, Dalek & more. |
| 16 | June 26 - July 8, 1982 | Peter Gabriel, Ry Cooder, Courgettes, Why Not, Stones, Bobby Womack, Nina Hagen, Joan Jett, Lindsay Anderson, Scritti, Yello & more. |
| 17 | (mid 1982) | Mel Brooks, Lorri Anderson, Peter Wolf, Becky Bondage, Elvis Costello & more. |
| 18 | July 29 - August 10, 1982 | Clint Eastwood, Captain Sensible & more. |
| 19 | (mid 1982) | Peter Murphy, Martin Rushent, Bauhaus, Martha Ladly & more. |

== Creators ==
Max Bell continued to write for publications including The Daily Californian, LA Weekly and Rolling Stone. Hugh Salmon went on to manage Ogilvy Thailand, and wrote his first play, Into Battle, which was premiered at Greenwich Theatre in London in October 2021.
