= Stické =

Indoor racquet sport

Stické, also called stické tennis, is an indoor racquet sport invented in the late 19th century merging aspects of real tennis, racquets and lawn tennis. It derives from sphairistikè (Ancient Greek meaning "the art of playing ball"), the term originally given to lawn tennis by Walter Clopton Wingfield.

== Manner of play ==
Stické is played with standard lawn tennis racquets and low-pressure balls in an enclosed court. The court is somewhat similar to a real tennis court in shape, but is smaller (about 78 feet by 27 feet) and different in construction. Play takes place using all the basics of lawn tennis and the same scoring system, with the addition of side and back walls. Players face each other over the net in pairs.

As in real tennis, there is a penthouse, used throughout the game as a playing surface and on which the service has to land to start each point. Some courts have a penthouse only down the side, while others have a penthouse at both ends as well.

== History ==
There were over 50 courts built throughout the British Empire since 1875. The game was created in the 1870’s as an outdoor game by the Royal Regiment of Artillery to keep soldiers fit. The first court was constructed using 9-foot square artillery targets. The dimensions of the Taplow Court built by Lord Desborough in 1892 became the standard. In the early 20th century, stické was a popular recreation at many country houses. At the time it was one of the few games that was played by both men and women.

As of 2005 only two playable courts remain:

- Hartham Park in Corsham, Wiltshire (England). Built in 1904 out of wood.
- Knightshayes Court in Tiverton, Devon (England). Built in 1907 out of wood.

The court at Viceregal Lodge complex, Indian Institute of Advanced Study, Shimla, Himachal Pradesh (India), has been adapted and is used for badminton.

Both English courts have active player groups, with an exception of Knightshayes during August to November 2015. During this time, the court was used to present an exhibition on the First World War, as the stické court was used throughout both the world wars as wards for wounded soldiers when the estate was used as a military hospital. The Indian court is used for badminton.

On July 13, 2024 Adrian Chivers and Hugh Richman retained their title as World Doubles Champions at the Hartham Park stické court.

A booklet about the sport, Sticke Tennis by Graham Tomkinson, was published in 2004.

A book The Rise and Fall of Sticke Tennis 1874-1939 by Nigel Courtenay à Brassard, was published by Ronaldson Publications in 2017, and republished in 2024.
