= Into Battle (poem) =

"Into Battle" is a 1915 war poem by a British First World War subaltern, Julian Grenfell. The poem was published posthumously in The Times after Grenfell fell in 1915. At the time it was as popular as Rupert Brooke's "The Soldier". The poem is pro-war in nature.
