= William Grenfell, 1st Baron Desborough =

British athlete and politician

The Lord Desborough
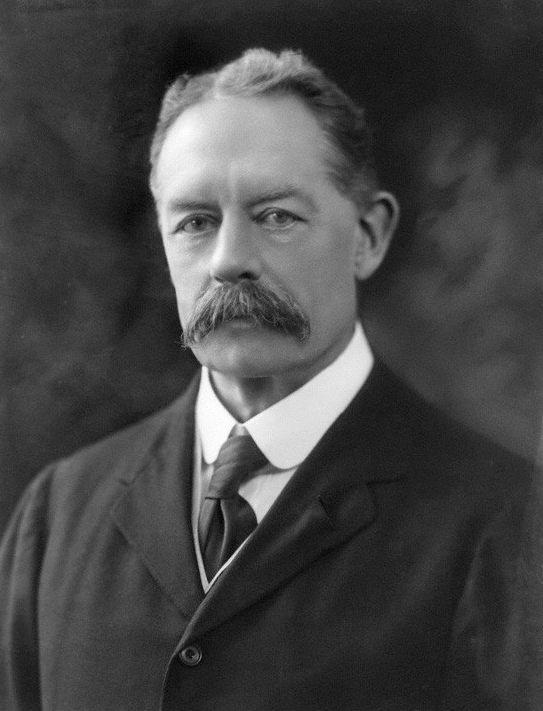
- William Henry Grenfell in 1921

Personal information
- Born: 30 October 1855 London, England
- Died: 9 January 1945 (aged 89) Panshanger, Hertfordshire, England
- Height: 1.83 m (6 ft 0 in)
- Weight: 89 kg (196 lb)

Sport
- Sport: Fencing
- Club: Amateur Fencing Association
Medal record
Representing Great Britain
Intercalated Games
Silver medal – second place	1906 Athens	Team épée

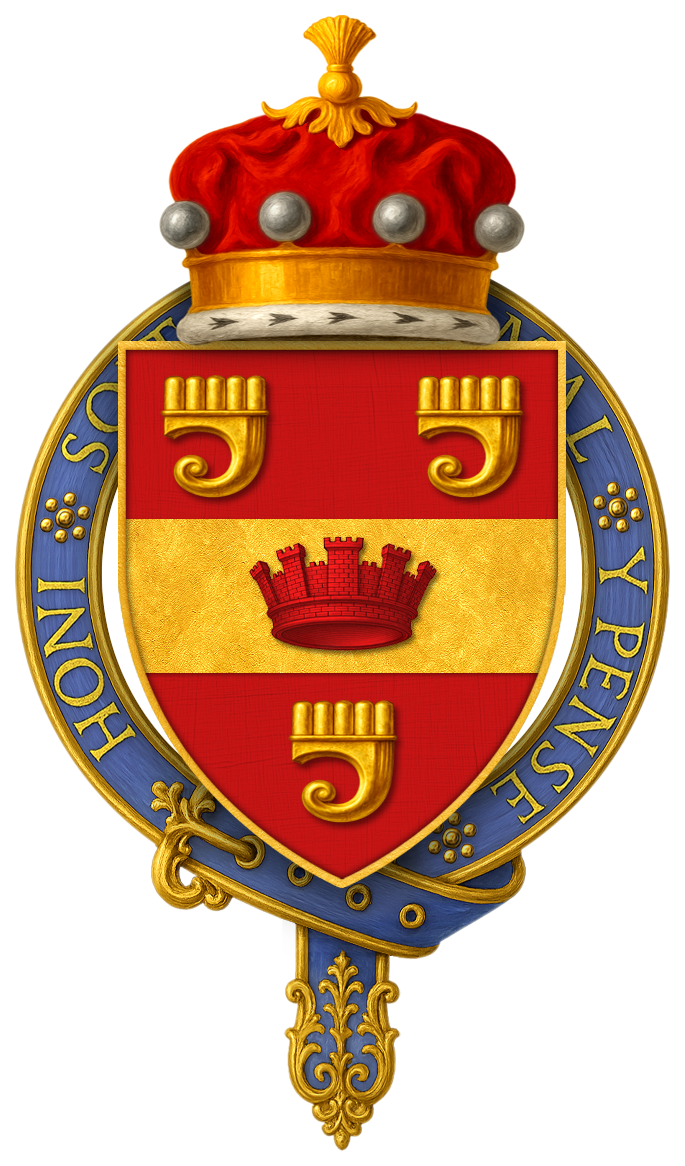
Garter-encircled shield of arms of William Grenfell, 1st Baron Desborough, KG, as displayed on his Order of the Garter stall plate in St George's Chapel, Windsor.

William Henry Grenfell, 1st Baron Desborough (30 October 1855 – 9 January 1945) was a British athlete, sportsman, public servant and politician. He sat in the House of Commons first for the Liberal Party and then for the Conservatives between 1880 and 1905 when he was raised to the peerage. He also was President of the Thames Conservancy Board for thirty-two years.

== Background and education ==
Grenfell was the son of Charles William Grenfell, former MP for Sandwich, and Georgiana Lascelles, daughter of William Saunders Lascelles, MP. He was the nephew of Henry Riversdale Grenfell, the banker and politician, and the first cousin of Edward Grenfell, 1st Baron St Just. Grenfell was educated at Harrow School and Balliol College, Oxford, graduating from the latter in 1879 and receiving the honorary degree of DCL from the university in 1938.

== Athletic career ==
At Harrow, Grenfell was a redoubtable bowler in the school's cricket eleven (1873–74), and whilst at Oxford, he rowed in the Boat Race, in the only dead-heat race against Cambridge in 1877, and in the following year, when he was president of the Oxford University Boat Club, he was in the Oxford crew which won by ten lengths. He was also president of the Oxford University Athletic Club, and it is believed that no other man has been president of both clubs. He was also the first-ever captain of Maidenhead Rowing Club. Furthermore, he combined these exertions with the mastership of the university drag hounds.

Grenfell enjoyed mountaineering, swimming, fishing and big-game hunting. He swam the Niagara rapids twice, rowed across the English Channel, sculled the London-Oxford stretch of the Thames in twenty-two consecutive hours, and when he was a member of the House of Commons he rowed for the Grand Challenge Cup. He climbed the Matterhorn by three different routes, and, in one long vacation, within just eight days, he climbed the little Matterhorn, the Matterhorn, Monte Rosa, and the Weisshorn. He loved deer stalking in Scotland, big-game hunting in the Rockies, India, and Africa, and fishing in many countries, being a successful tarpon fisherman off the coast of Florida, where he caught over a hundred tarpon. He was an amateur punting champion of the Upper Thames, winning the Thames punting championship for three consecutive years (1888–90) and then retired with an unbeaten record. He won the silver medal for fencing in the event of team épée at the 1906 Intercalated Games, having been the first person to carry the flag for Great Britain in the parade of nations. In 1908, he was president of the Olympic games held in London.

He was President of the Amateur Fencing Association from its foundation until 1926, Marylebone Cricket Club based at Lords, the Lawn Tennis Association based at Wimbledon, and was president and chairman of the Bath Club from its foundation in 1894 until 1942, and chairman of the Pilgrims of Great Britain from 1919 to 1929. He was also a founder member of Maidenhead Golf Club in Berkshire, formed in 1896. It was the friendship of one local founder member, Dr G E Moore, with Grenfell that really got the project off the ground. Grenfell was the Mayor of Maidenhead in 1895 and 1896 and an extremely wealthy and competent businessman who owned more than 10,000 acres of land around the town. Grenfell offered to lease some of his acreage near Maidenhead Railway Station, which was to become Maidenhead Golf Club and remains so well into its second century. Grenfell became one of the earliest 63 members of the club, and its first president and agreed to present “a challenge cup for competition”. This was the Grenfell Cup which is still in yearly competition. A registered golf tournament survives in his name since 1912 with its top prize being The Desborough Cup.

== Political career ==
In the 1880 general election, Grenfell was elected the Member of Parliament for Salisbury; he lost the seat in a ministerial by-election in 1882 but returned in 1885–1886. He was elected MP for Hereford in 1892. Politically he was a Gladstonian (loyal) Liberal who resigned in 1893 rather than support Gladstone's Second Irish Home Rule Bill. He returned to the House of Commons in 1900 as a Conservative. On 30 December 1905, Grenfell was raised to the peerage as Baron Desborough, of Taplow in the County of Buckingham, a title that combined the defunct hundred of Desborough and the riverside village in which he lived in Buckinghamshire.

== Other public appointments ==
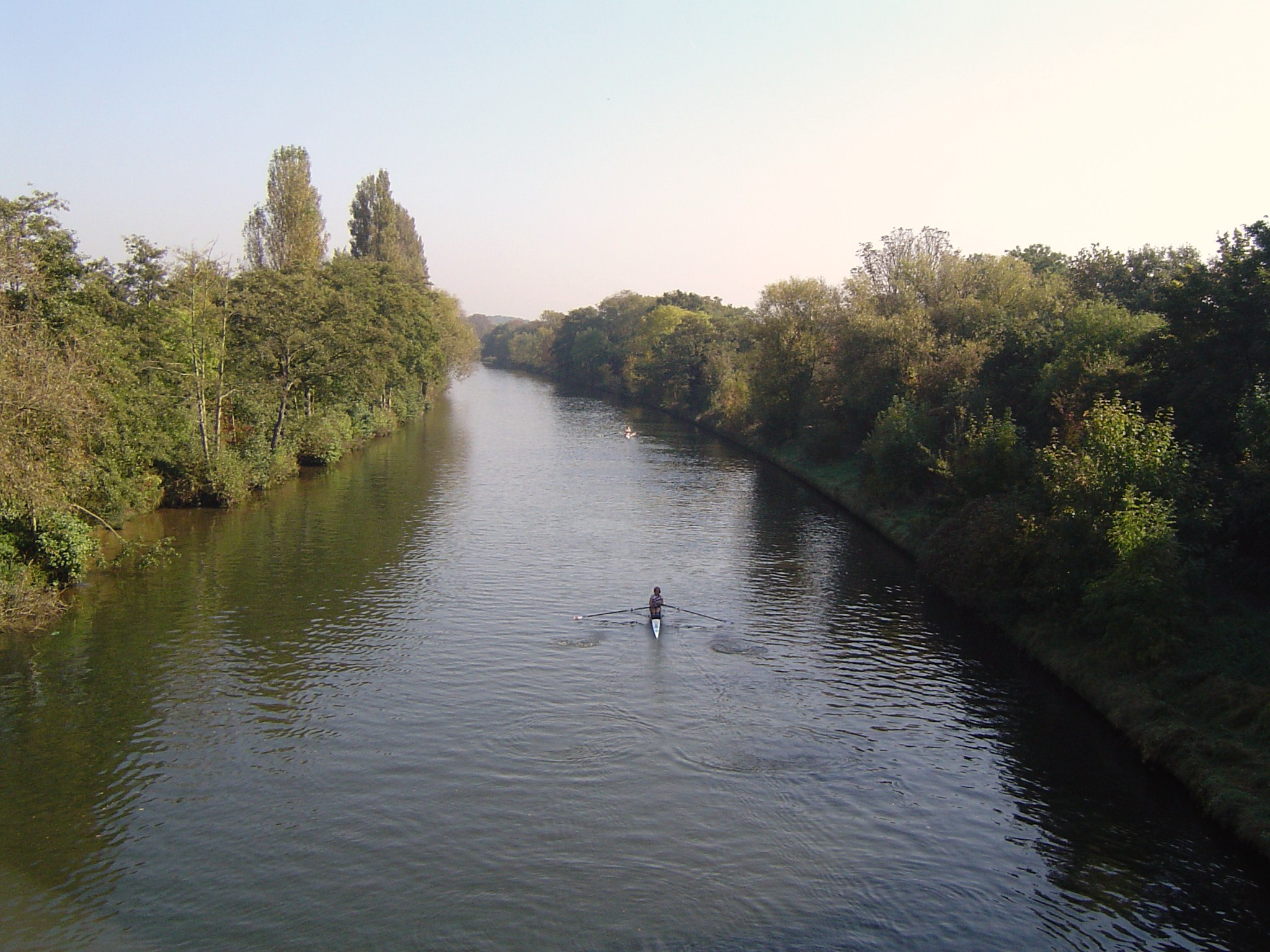
Desborough Cut on the River Thames, from one of the bridges.

During a long career dedicated to public service, he was President of the Thames Conservancy Board from 1904 to 1937, the London Chamber of Commerce, and the Royal Agricultural Society, amongst many others. He was High Steward of Maidenhead, the nearest town to his home at Taplow Court, Taplow in Buckinghamshire. His good deeds for Maidenhead included the donation of an old chalk pit, converted for use as a park, to celebrate the diamond jubilee of Queen Victoria: this park, Grenfell Park, contains many unusual trees, the seeds of which were collected by Lord Desborough as he travelled the world. He was also an active Freemason. He became a steward of Henley Royal Regatta. He was a J.P. for Buckinghamshire and a Deputy Lieutenant for Tower Hamlets. He was appointed High Sheriff of Buckinghamshire in 1889. On 3 Jun 1915, he was appointed a deputy lieutenant of Buckinghamshire. In 1919, he presided over the Desborough Committee which investigated the conditions that led to the crippling London Police Strike of August 1918. Its recommendations resulted in the enactment of the influential Police Act 1919 which changed the working conditions of the police in London, Liverpool, Manchester, Birmingham and elsewhere.

Desborough was appointed CVO in 1907 and advanced to KCVO in 1908 and GCVO (Knight Grand Cross) in the 1925 Birthday Honours; and in 1928 he was admitted as a Knight Companion of the Order of the Garter. He was a Major of the 1st Battalion, Buckinghamshire Rifle Volunteers from February 1900. In November 1914, he was appointed President of the Central Association of Volunteer Training Corps, a voluntary home defence militia, until it was disbanded in 1920. From 1924 to 1929 he was Captain of the Yeomen of the Guard. Between 1919 and 1929 he was chairman of the Pilgrims of Great Britain. He planned and oversaw the construction of the Desborough Cut, a navigation channel between nearby stretches of the Thames at Walton-on-Thames and Weybridge, which was opened in 1935. The large island created thereby was named Desborough Island.

In 1933 he was one of eleven people (Note: The letter was signed: Desborough; Hugh S. Gladstone; Grey of Fallodon; Julian S. Huxley (Chancellor of Oxford University); T. G Longstaff; Percy R. Lowe; P. Chalmers Mitchell; Rothschild; Scone M.P. (Chairman, British Trust for Ornithology); E. L. Turner; H. F. Witherby (President, British Ornithologists' Union)) involved in the appeal that led to the foundation of the British Trust for Ornithology (BTO), an organisation for the study of birds in the British Isles.

Desborough had the unfortunate distinction of having an obituary prematurely published on 2 December 1920 by The Times, which confused his name with that of Lord Bessborough, who really had died – Desborough died 25 years later at the age of 89.

== Family ==
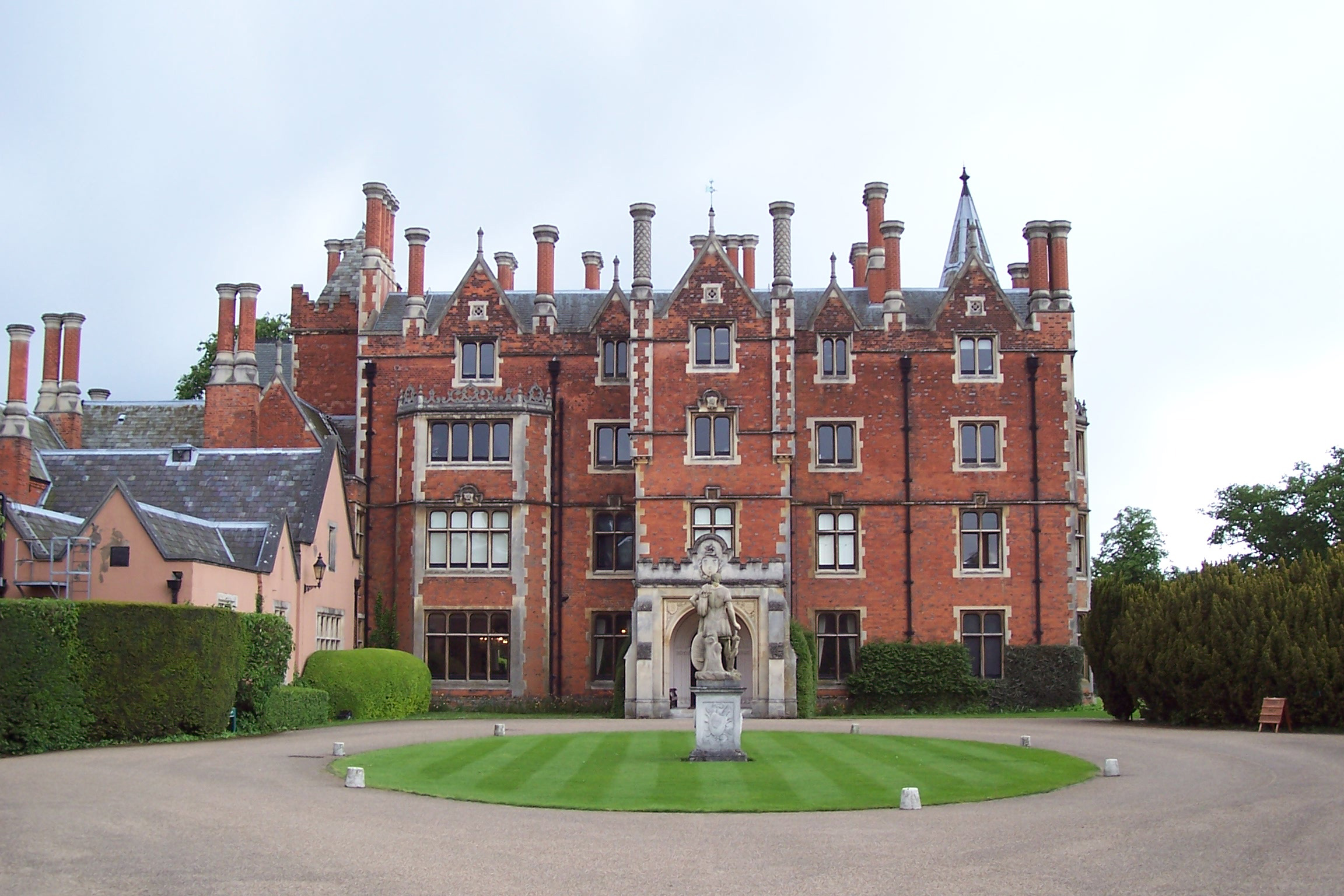
Taplow Court, front view

Lord Desborough married Ethel Fane, daughter of the Hon. Julian Fane and granddaughter of John Fane, 11th Earl of Westmorland, in 1887. They had three sons and two daughters. His eldest son was the poet Julian Grenfell, who was killed in action in 1915. His second son Gerald William Grenfell was also killed, about two months after his elder brother. His third son, Ivo George Grenfell, died in 1926 as the result of a car accident. His daughters were Alexandra Imogen Clair Grenfell (Imogen) (1905–1969) and Monica Margaret Grenfell (1893–1973). As all his sons predeceased him, the barony became extinct. The family lived at Taplow Court, where he and his wife hosted gatherings of the elite and aristocratic group, the 'Souls', adjacent on the riverside to Cliveden, which is a slightly grander country estate, but which saw its social heyday immediately after, from 1920 to 1965. Lady Desborough was a well-known celebrity in her day. Margot Asquith, whose husband would later be politically aligned against Desborough, said of her, "She tells enough white lies to ice a wedding cake".

In 1892, he built a stické tennis court at the house.

He was the owner of Whiteslea Lodge on the Hickling Estate in Norfolk, close to the Hickling Broad. This was the former shooting lodge of Whiteslea Estate and was extensively improved and added to by Lord Desborough in the 1930s. Its interior featured enormous friezes by bird artist Roland Green.

Desborough College in Maidenhead is named after Lord Desborough.

== Arms ==
Coat of arms of William Grenfell, Baron Desborough
Crest On the battlements of a tower gules, a griffin passant or, holding in the beak a sprig of laurel. Escutcheon Gules, on a fess between three organ rests or, a mural crown of the first. Supporters On either side a griffin or, collared gules, supporting a spear proper, therefrom a banner also gules charged with an organ rest as in the arms. Motto Loyal devoir (Honest duty). Orders The Most Noble Order of the Garter

== See also ==
- List of Oxford University Boat Race crews
- Titan of the Thames: the Life of Lord Desborough by Sandy Nairne and Peter Williams, Unbound 2024 - https://unbound.com/books/titan

== Notes ==
Parliament of the United Kingdom
Preceded by Granville Ryder; John Alfred Lush	Member of Parliament for Salisbury; 2-seat constituency 1880–1882; With: John Passmore Edwards)	Succeeded by John Passmore Edwards; Coleridge Kennard
Preceded by John Passmore Edwards; Coleridge Kennard	Member of Parliament for Salisbury (1-seat constituency); 1885–1886	Succeeded by Edward Hulse
Preceded by Sir Joseph Bailey	Member of Parliament for Hereford; 1892–1893	Succeeded by Charles Cooke
Preceded by Richard Curzon	Member of Parliament for Wycombe; 1900–1905	Succeeded by Arnold Herbert
Peerage of the United Kingdom
New creation	Baron Desborough; 1905–1945	Extinct
