= Jamie Salmon =

England & NZ international rugby union player

- Born: 16 October 1959 (age 67) Hong Kong
- Height: 1.83 m (6 ft 0 in)
- Weight: 84 kg (185 lb)

Rugby union career
- Position: Centre
International career
Years	Team	Apps	(Points)
1980-1981	New Zealand	7	(8)
1985-1987	England	12	(4)

James Lionel Broome Salmon (born 16 October 1959) is a former rugby union player. Born in Hong Kong, he played international rugby for both New Zealand, winning three caps, and England, winning 12 caps. He is the only man to have played for both countries' senior national teams.

== Career ==
Salmon played as a centre. He moved to New Zealand in 1977 after not being selected in a Kent under-19 trial. He became a Wellington player in 1980, then first appeared for New Zealand at under-23 level before being selected for a match against Fiji which did not carry full capped status.

Qualifying through residency, he was selected for New Zealand's tour to Europe in the autumn of 1981 and won all his three international caps on that tour. He made his full New Zealand debut against Romania in Bucharest and played in both tests against France.

Salmon moved back to England at the end of the 1983 New Zealand season having made 64 appearances for Wellington. He made his England international debut on 1 June 1985 against his former team, New Zealand, in Christchurch, losing 18–13. His last appearance for England was in the 1987 Rugby World Cup against Wales in Brisbane, losing 16–3. He won twelve caps for England in addition to his three for New Zealand.

He played his club rugby with Harlequins, and after retiring had an executive role with them.

Since retiring from rugby, he has worked for Sky Sports and ITV and also has a column in The Daily Telegraph.

Salmon is the son of Gerald Mordaunt Broome Salmon and the brother of Hugh Salmon.
