= Gerald Mordaunt Broome Salmon =

- Born: September 27, 1921; Waltham St Lawrence, England
- Died: April 16, 2002 (aged 80)
- Occupation: Businessman
- Known for: Appointed to the Legislative Council of Hong Kong
- Spouse: Margaret Anne Pike
- Children: 4
- Parent(s): Lionel Mordaunt Broome Salmon and Henrietta Elizabeth Keays Young

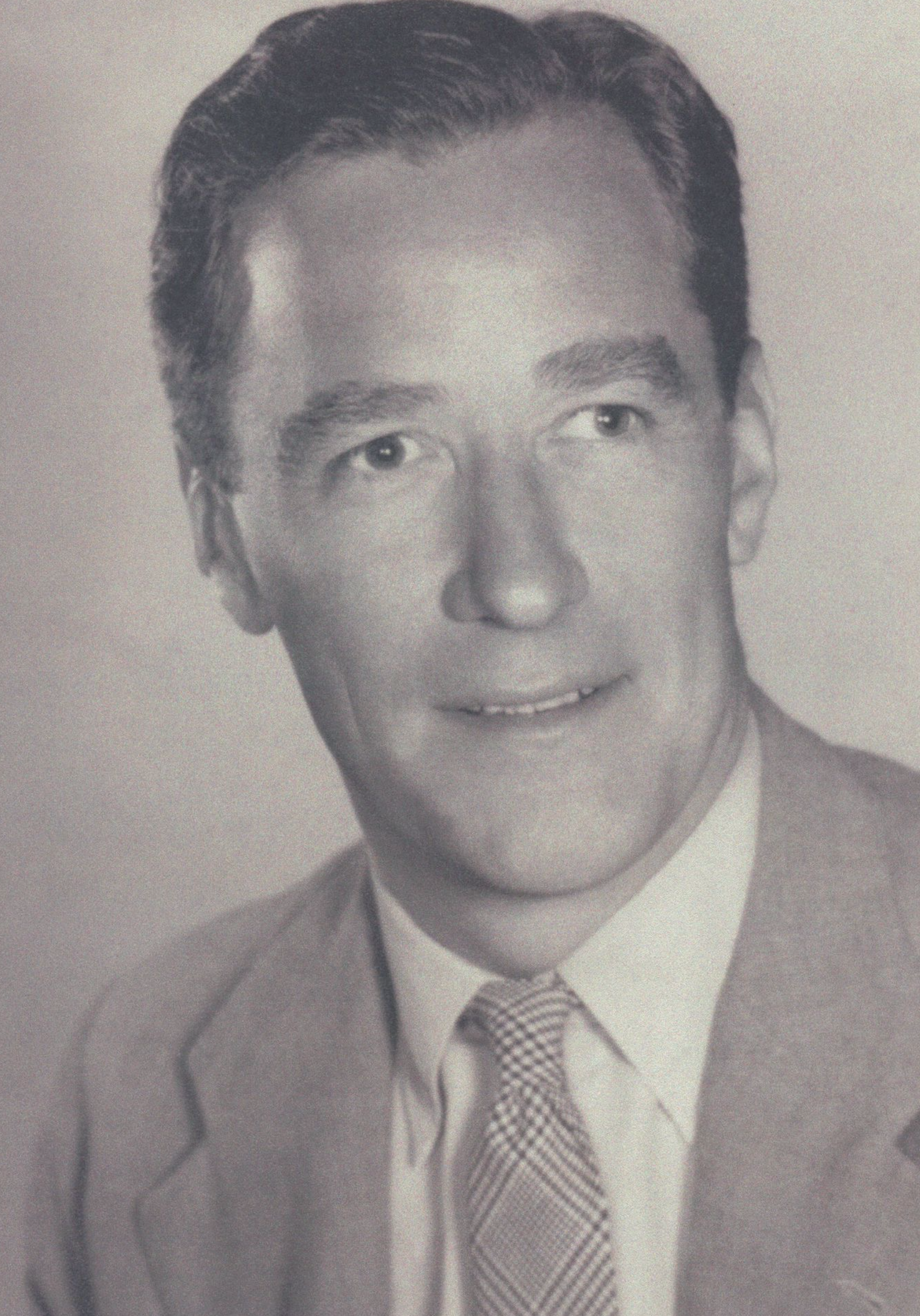
Gerald Mordaunt Broome Salmon

Gerald Mordaunt Broome Salmon, OBE (27 September 1921 – 16 April 2002) was a British businessman.

== Early years ==
Salmon was born on 27 September 1921 in Waltham St Lawrence, England, to Lionel Mordaunt Broome Salmon and Henrietta Elizabeth Keays Young, an established military family. He followed his family tradition by joining the Indian Army. He was promoted to 2nd Lieutenant on 17 May 1941.

== Career ==
He joined P&O and became its manager. He was also director of the Wharf Company and the chairman of the board of the Hongkong Electric Company and Mackinnon, Mackenzie & Co.

Salmon was first appointed to the Legislative Council of Hong Kong in 1969. In 1970, he was elected chairman of the Hong Kong General Chamber of Commerce after served as a vice-chairman under Michael Herries. He went on to represent the chamber from 1970 to 1972. He was also member of the Board of Trustees of United College and director of the Hong Kong Trade Development Council. In 1973, he was awarded Officer of the Order of the British Empire (OBE) for his public services in Hong Kong.

== Personal life ==
He married Margaret Anne Pike and had four sons, Hugh Salmon, Peter Salmon, Jamie Salmon and Anthony Salmon.

Business positions
Preceded by Michael Herries	Chairman of the Hong Kong General Chamber of Commerce; 1970–1971	Succeeded by Peter Williams
Legislative Council of Hong Kong
Preceded by Michael Herries	Unofficial Member; Representative for Hong Kong General Chamber of Commerce; 1970–1972	Succeeded by Peter Williams
