= Julian Fane (diplomat) =

British diplomat and poet (1827–1870)

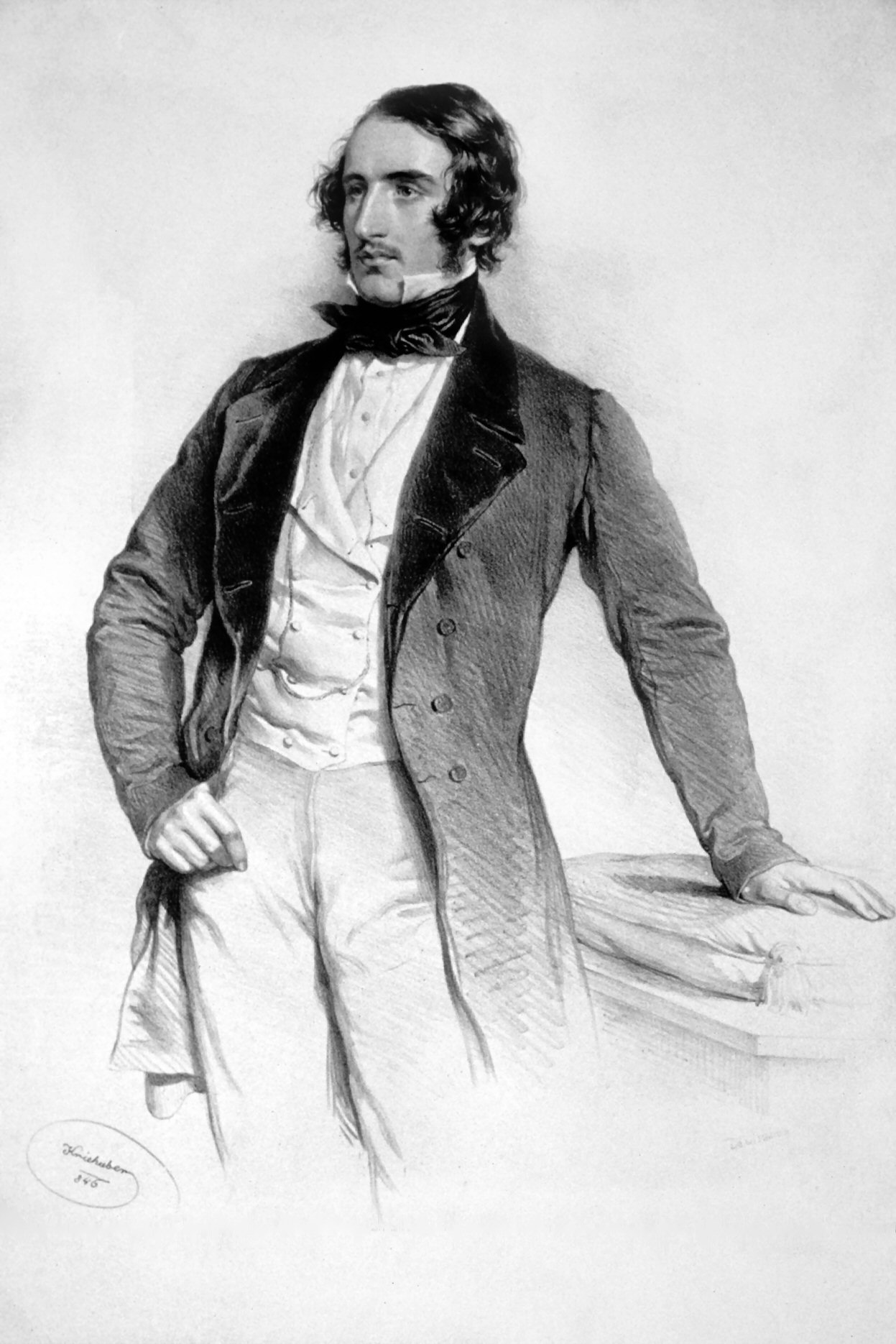
Julian Fane, Lithograph by Josef Kriehuber, 1846

The Honourable Julian Henry Charles Fane (10 October 1827 – 19 April 1870) was a British diplomat and poet. He was a Cambridge Apostle.

== Life ==
Fane was the fifth and youngest son of John Fane, 11th Earl of Westmorland and Lady Priscilla Anne, daughter of William Wellesley-Pole, 3rd Earl of Mornington. He was educated at Harrow and Trinity College, Cambridge, where he was a member of the 'Apostles', chancellor's medallist in 1850 and graduated M.A. in 1851. Between 1856 and 1858 he was secretary of legation at St. Petersburg and first secretary and acting chargé d'affaires at Paris from 1865 to 1867.

An extract from a letter written by Edward Granville, the 3rd Earl St Germans, to his son (dated Aug 5, 1850) reads: "Julian Fane has just gained his gold medal at Cambridge for his best English poem. [His Mother] went down to hear him recite it. He must by all accounts be a remarkably clever young man, besides being a wonderful musician."

In 1852 he issued Poems, and a translation of Heine in 1854.

Fane married Lady Adine Eliza Anne, daughter of George Cowper, 6th Earl Cowper, in 1866. They had one son (who did not reach adulthood) and a daughter, Ethel Anne Priscilla, who married William Grenfell, 1st Baron Desborough. Lady Adine Fane died in October 1868, only a few months after the birth of her son. Fane only survived her by two years and died in 1870.

He died at 29 Portman Square, London, on 19 April 1870.
