= Julian Grenfell =

British soldier and war poet (1888–1915)

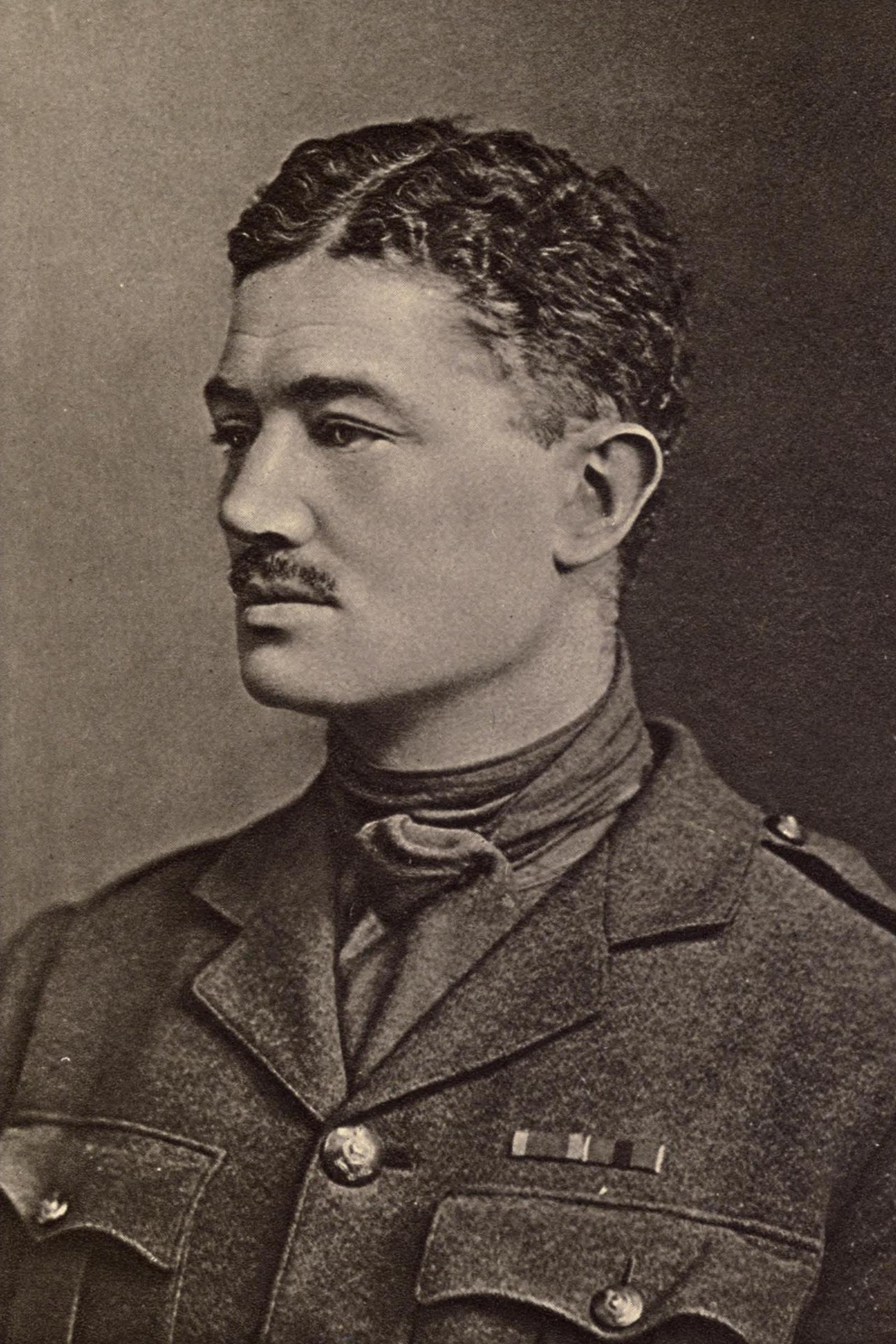
- Julian Grenfell in military uniform including his DSO ribbon
- Born: 30 March 1888; Westminster, London, England
- Died: 26 May 1915 (aged 27); Boulogne, Pas-de-Calais, France
- Relatives: Captain Francis Octavius Grenfell VC (cousin)
- Military career
- Allegiance: United Kingdom
- Branch: Royal Dragoons
- Service years: 1910–1915
- Rank: Captain
- Conflicts: World War I
- Awards: Distinguished Service Order

Julian Henry Francis Grenfell (30 March 1888 – 26 May 1915) was a British soldier and a war poet of World War I.

== Early life ==
Julian Grenfell was born at 4 St James's Square, London, the eldest son of William Grenfell, later Baron Desborough, and Ethel Priscilla Fane, daughter of Julian Fane.

He was educated at Eton where he was good friends with Denys Finch Hatton, Edward Horner, and latterly with Patrick Shaw-Stewart. From Eton he went up to Balliol College, Oxford, where he soon developed a reputation for bullying and rowdy behaviour, such as cracking a stock whip within inches of Philip Sassoon's head. In his final year at Oxford Grenfell began to struggle with his studies, his moods became unstable, and he was anxious, agitated and miserable. His friends and family found it hard to understand what was wrong, but to modern eyes he was clearly suffering from a recurrent major depressive illness. After consulting with his college and his parents Grenfell opted to take a pass degree, as he was not well enough to continue with his honours course. After University Julian spent much of his time involved in outdoor activities; hunting and fishing, and as a somewhat reluctant participant in his mother's high society parties, and country house weekends. It was at one such gathering that Julian met Marjory Manners, daughter of the Duke of Rutland, to whom he became devoted. They corresponded for a lengthy period, and Marjory was one of the first to write to Julian's mother Ettie, after his death to tell of her anguish.

== Military service ==
Grenfell was commissioned in the British Army in 1907 and eventually attached to the 1st (Royal) Dragoons in 1910. He was initially sent out to India, where he enjoyed the big game hunting but found military service tedious and his fellow officers rather dull. He then moved with his regiment to South Africa, which Julian greatly disliked (he described South Africa as a landscape of endless scrubland dotted with tin huts, and no trees). By the summer of 1914 he was writing to his mother seeking her help to get him out of the army and back to Britain, having decided to move to a career in politics. When war broke out in August his regiment returned to the U.K. and were sent to Salisbury Plain for intensive training prior to deployment to the western front. It quickly became clear that the conflict had become bogged down in static trench warfare, with little or no role for the cavalry. Julian's unit became de facto infantry soldiers, and despite all the discomforts and dangers he continued to write upbeat letters to his family and friends. Julian became aware that lives were being regularly lost to German snipers. Using hunting skills he had developed at Panshanger, Julian taught his men how to crawl through no-mans land unseen, "steering by the stars" to attack the German front line trenches, and gain intelligence.

For this, he was awarded a Distinguished Service Order in the 1915 New Year Honours;

Lieutenant The Honourable Julian Henry Francis Grenfell, 1st (Royal) Dragoons. On the 17th November he succeeded in reaching a point behind the enemy's trenches and making an excellent reconnaissance, furnishing early information of a pending attack by the enemy.

On 13 May 1915 as a captain in the 1st (Royal) Dragoons, Grenfell stood talking with a General Campbell. A shell landed a few yards from them, injuring both men. The general was able to help Julian to the nearest aid post, where he was initially so cheerful that everyone thought he had only a minor wound. When he (presciently) said "I think I shall die" his friends objected, but Julian insisted "you see if I don't". He was taken to a hospital at Wimereux, where his sister Monica was working as a V.A.D. nurse. He initially seemed to be holding his own, but an X-ray showed he had an extensive skull fracture, and underlying brain injury. He was operated on at once, but on 23 May the doctors found his wound was infected so a second operation was undertaken. After this he was in continuous pain, and began to deteriorate. One of his arms gradually became paralysed, and he became increasingly drowsy. For ten long hot days his mother and father sat by his bedside, while Julian remembered happier times in younger years at Taplow Court with his mother, and recited poetry, particularly his favourite, the ancient Greek tragedy Hippolytus by Euripides. He died from encephalitis on the afternoon of 26 May with his mother, father and sister at his bedside. He was 27 years old and was buried at the Boulogne Eastern Cemetery; his mother covered his grave with oak leaves and wild flowers sent by his younger sister from home. The day after his death, together with news of his death, his most famous poem Into Battle was published for the first time, in The Times.

In a letter from October 1914, Grenfell had written "I adore war. ... It is like a big picnic but without the objectivelessness of a picnic. I have never been more well or more happy. ... It just suits my stolid health and stolid nerves and barbaric disposition. The fighting-excitement vitalizes everything, every sight and action. One loves one's fellow man so much more when one is bent on killing him." This contrasts sharply with the work of later war poets such as Siegfried Sassoon or Wilfred Owen, but it should be remembered that Grenfell was a professional soldier; in any event, many British veterans of the war later rejected the idea that Sassoon and Owen spoke for them. Historian Max Hastings says of Grenfell that he was "idolised by his peers for reasons mystifying to posterity."

His younger brother the Honourable Gerald William (Billy) Grenfell was killed in action on 30 July 1915, within a mile of where Julian had previously been fatally wounded. The death of both Julian and Billy was a dreadful blow to their mother Lady (Ethel) "Ettie" Desborough, who was haunted by bereavement for the rest of her life. Tragically her 3rd remaining son, Ivo, was killed from a head injury sustained in a motor accident, and he died in circumstances very similar to Julian's death.

== Commemoration ==
On 11 November 1985, Grenfell was among 16 Great War poets commemorated on a slate stone unveiled in Westminster Abbey's Poets' Corner. The inscription on the stone was taken from Wilfred Owen's "Preface" to his poems and reads: "My subject is War, and the pity of War. The Poetry is in the pity."

Today Grenfell is most remembered for his poem "Into Battle" written in May 1915, the closing lines read;

"The thundering line of battle stands,
And in the air Death moans and sings;
But Day shall clasp him with strong hands,
And Night shall fold him in soft wings."
