= Ettie Grenfell, Baroness Desborough =

British Lady of the Bedchamber

The Right Honourable The Lady Desborough
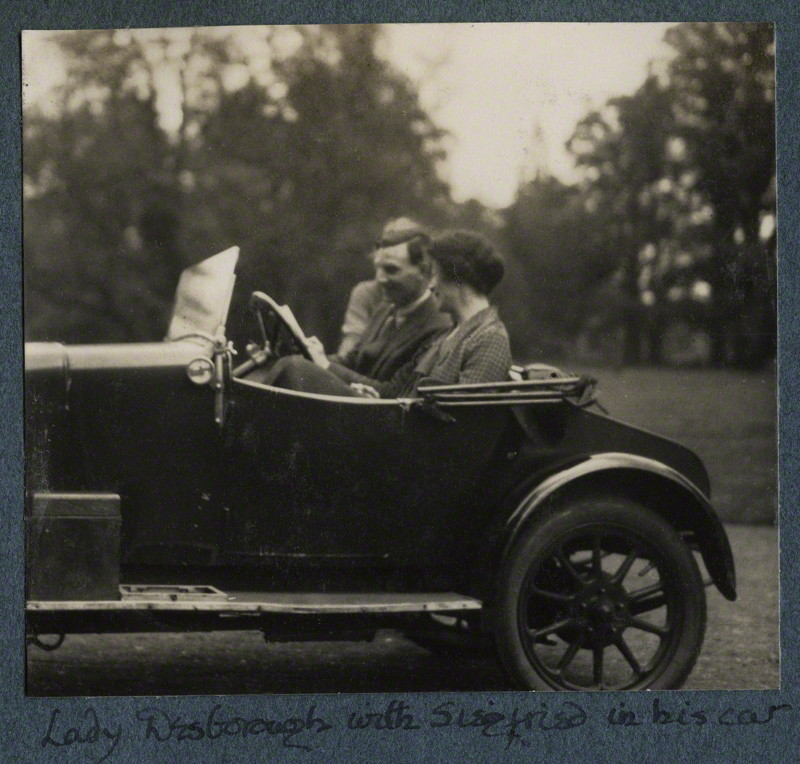
- in Siegfried Sassoon's car
- Born: 27 June 1867
- Died: 28 May 1952 (aged 84)
- Known for: society hostess

Ethel Anne Priscilla Grenfell, Baroness Desborough (née Fane; 27 June 1867 – 28 May 1952) was a British society hostess.

== Life ==
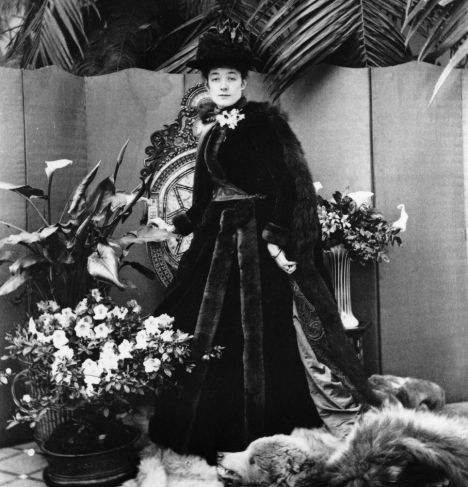
Ettie photographed by Lord Battersea

Ethel (Ettie) Fane was born into an aristocratic family. However, at the age of three she was orphaned when her father, Julian Fane, the younger son of an earl, died at the age of 42, soon after the death of Ettie's mother.

Fane married William Grenfell in 1887. He was at the time untitled but he was a Member of Parliament, first for the Liberal Party and then for the Conservative Party. William and Ethel had a happy marriage, but Ethel also had male admirers. One of those was Archie Ian Gordon who was the son of John Hamilton-Gordon, 1st Marquess of Aberdeen and Temair. He was devoted to her and she lost him when he died in a car crash in 1909.

From 1911, Ettie was periodically in waiting as Lady of the Bedchamber to Mary of Teck, Queen Consort to George V. When she was appointed, her son was surprised as the idea of a Lady of the Bedchamber seemed anachronistic.

Three of her sons predeceased her. Julian Grenfell, a war poet, was killed in the First World War. News of his being wounded was given to her via one of her daughters who was serving as a nurse in France. Julian's elder sister Monica Margaret Grenfell had undertaken three months 'special training' in nursing at The London Hospital under Matron Eva Luckes just after the outbreak of war. Ethel travelled to France to see her son who had a splinter in his brain. Julian took 13 days to die. Another son, Gerald William (Billy) Grenfell, was killed only months later in July 1915. A third son, Ivo Grenfell, who became a farmer, died in a car accident in 1926.

She was a well known hostess; Winston Churchill and H. G. Wells were amongst her guests, and she was said to be the confidante of six prime ministers (Rosebery, Balfour, Asquith, Baldwin, Chamberlain and Churchill). She and her husband were members of the social group known as "The Souls". Visitors included Henry Irving, Vita Sackville-West, Edward VII when Prince of Wales, Patrick Shaw-Stewart, Edith Wharton and Oscar Wilde.
