= Bouchercon XXIV =

1993 mystery and detective fiction convention

- Date: October 1, 1993
- Location: Omaha, Nebraska
- Country: USA
- Hosted by: Charles Levitt

Bouchercon is an annual convention of creators and devotees of mystery and detective fiction. It is named in honour of writer, reviewer, and editor Anthony Boucher; also the inspiration for the Anthony Awards, which have been issued at the convention since 1986. This page details Bouchercon XXIV and the 8th Anthony Awards ceremony.

== Bouchercon ==
The convention was held in Omaha, Nebraska on October 1, 1993; running until the 3rd. The event was chaired by bookseller Charles Levitt.

=== Special Guests ===
- Lifetime Achievement awards — Hammond Innes & Ralph McInerny
- Guest of Honor — Ed McBain
- Fan guest of Honor — Don Sandstrom
- Toastmaster — Ori Hardy-Sayles

== Anthony Awards ==
The following list details the awards distributed at the eighth annual Anthony Awards ceremony.

=== Novel award ===
Winner:

- Margaret Maron, Bootlegger's Daughter

Shortlist:

- Robert Crais, Lullaby Town
- John Dunning, Booked to Die
- Carolyn Hart, Southern Ghost
- Sharyn McCrumb, The Hangman's Beautiful Daughter

=== First novel award ===
Winner:

- Barbara Neely, Blanche on the Lam

Shortlist:

- Susan Wittig Albert, Thyme of Death
- Carol Higgins Clark, Decked
- Michael Connelly, The Black Echo
- Charlene Weir, The Winter Widow

=== Short story award ===
Winner:

- Diane Mott Davidson, "Cold Turkey", from Sisters in Crime 5

Shortlist:

- Doug Allyn, "Candles in the Rain", from Ellery Queen's Mystery Magazine November 1992
- Edward D. Hoch, "The Summer of Our Discontent", from Ellery Queen's Mystery Magazine November 1992
- Gabrielle Kraft, "One Hit Wonder", from Sisters in Crime 5
- Rochelle Krich, "A Golden Opportunity", from Sisters in Crime 5

=== Critical / Non-fiction award ===
Winner:

- Ellen Nehr, Doubleday Crime Club Compendium 1928-1991

Shortlist:

- David Coomes, Dorothy L. Sayers: A Careless Rage for Life
- John Loughery, Alias S.S. Van Dine

=== True crime award ===
Winner:

- Barbara D'Amato, The Doctor, the Murder, the Mystery: The True Story of the Dr. John Branion Murder Case

Shortlist:

- Jana Bommersbach & Bruce Henderson, The Trunk Murderess: Winnie Ruth Judd
- Thomas H. Cook & William Wright, Blood Echoes: The True Story of an Infamous Mass Murder and Its Aftermath
- Philip E. Ginsburg & Eric Stover, The Shadow Of Death : The Hunt for a Serial Killer
- Ann Rule, Everything She Ever Wanted: A True Story of Obsessive Love, Murder, and Betrayal

=== Motion picture award ===
Winner:

- The Crying Game

Shortlist:

- The Bodyguard
- A Few Good Men
- The Player
- Single White Female
