= Crippen & Landru =

American publisher

Crippen & Landru Publishers is a small publisher of mystery fiction collections, based in Cincinnati, Ohio, United States. It was founded in 1994 by husband and wife Sandi and Douglas G. Greene in Norfolk, Virginia, United States, and is named after murderers Dr. H. H. Crippen and Henri Landru. The Greenes' son Eric designed the logo. Jeffrey Marks succeeded Douglas G. Greene as publisher on January 1, 2018, while Dr. Greene remains active as Series Editor.

Crippen & Landru publishes two distinct series of single-author short story collections. The Regular Series, generally featuring current authors, is published in two editions: cloth bound, signed and numbered; and trade softcover. The Lost Classics Series features uncollected stories by great mystery and detective writers of the past. It is available in dust-jacketed cloth and trade softcover. Some titles are also available as e-books.

Among the authors published by Crippen & Landru are Lawrence Block, Max Allan Collins, Margaret Maron, Peter Lovesey, Bill Pronzini, Michael Gilbert, and Edward D. Hoch.

== Books published ==
Year	Author	Title
1994	John Dickson Carr	Speak of the Devil
1995	Margery Allingham	The Darings of the Red Rose
1995	Marcia Muller	The McCone Files
1996	Edward D. Hoch	Diagnosis: Impossible
1996	Patricia Moyes	Who Killed Father Christmas?
1996	Bill Pronzini	Spadework
1997	Michael Gilbert	The Man Who Hated Banks
1997	Edward D. Hoch	The Ripper of Storyville
1997	H. R. F. Keating	In Kensington Gardens Once
1997	Margaret Maron	Shoveling Smoke
1997	James Yaffe	My Mother the Detective
1998	P. M. Carlson	Renowned Be Thy Grave
1998	Jeremiah Healy	The Concise Cuddy
1998	Peter Lovesey	Do Not Exceed the Stated Dose
1998	Bill Pronzini	Carpenter and Quincannon
1998	Peter Robinson	Not Safe After Dark
1999	Doug Allyn	All Creatures Dark and Dangerous
1999	Lawrence Block	One Night Stands
1999	Ed Gorman	Famous Blue Raincoat
1999	Ellery Queen	The Tragedy of Errors
2000	Hugh B. Cave	Long Live the Dead
2000	Michael Collins	Fortune’s World
2000	Joe Gores	Stakeout on Page Street
2000	Edward D. Hoch	The Velvet Touch
2000	Clark Howard	Challenge the Widow-Maker
2000	Marcia Muller	McCone and Friends
2000	Carolyn Wheat	Tales Out of School
2001	Lawrence Block	The Lost Cases of Ed London
2001	Max Allan Collins	The Kisses of Death
2001	Susan Dunlap	The Celestial Buffet
2001	Ron Goulart	Adam and Eve on a Raft
2001	Edward D. Hoch	The Old Spies Club
2001	Michael Z. Lewin	The Reluctant Detective
2001	Peter Lovesey	The Sedgemoor Strangler
2001	Ross Macdonald	Strangers in Town
2002	Christianna Brand	The Spotted Cat (“Lost Classics Series”)
2002	Charles B. Child	The Sleuth of Baghdad (“Lost Classics Series”)
2002	Brendan DuBois	The Dark Snow
2002	Michael Gilbert	The Curious Conspiracy
2002	Peter Godfrey	The Newtonian Egg (“Lost Classics Series”)
2002	Wendy Hornsby	Nine Sons
2002	Stuart Palmer	Hildegarde Withers (“Lost Classics Series”)
2002	Craig Rice	Murder, Mystery and Malone (“Lost Classics Series”)
2002	Georges Simenon	The 13 Culprits
2002	Raoul Whitfield	Jo Gar’s Casebook
2003	Jon L. Breen	Kill the Umpire
2003	William Campbell Gault	Marksman (“Lost Classics Series”)
2003	Hugh B. Cave	Come Into My Parlor
2003	Liza Cody	Lucky Dip
2003	William DeAndrea	Murder – All Kinds (“Lost Classics Series”)
2003	Jeremiah Healy	Cuddy – Plus One
2003	Edward D. Hoch	The Iron Angel
2003	Gerald Kersh	Karmesin (“Lost Classics Series”)
2003	C. Daly King	The Complete Curious Mr. Tarrant (“Lost Classics Series”)
2003	Helen McCloy	The Pleasant Assassin (“Lost Classics Series”)
2003	Bill Pronzini and Barry N. Malzberg	Problems Solved
2003	Eric Wright	A Killing Climate
2004	Anthony Berkeley	The Avenging Chance (“Lost Classics Series”)
2004	Joseph Commings	Banner Deadlines (“Lost Classics Series”)
2004	Kathy Lynn Emerson	Murders and Other Confusions
2004	Erle Stanley Gardner	The Danger Zone (“Lost Classics Series”)
2004	Margaret Maron	Suitable for Hanging
2004	Margaret Millar	The Couple Next Door (“Lost Classics Series”)
2004	Mickey Spillane	Byline: Mickey Spillane
2004	T. S. Stribling	Dr. Poggioli: Criminologist
2005	Michael Collins	Slot-Machine Kelly
2005	Terence Faherty	The Confessions of Owen Keane
2005	Edward Marston	Murder – Ancient and Modern
2005	Gladys Mitchell	Sleuth’s Alchemy
2005	Ellery Queen	The Adventure of the Murdered Moths
2005	Philip Warne	Who Was Guilty?
2006	Detection Club	The Verdict of Us All
2006	Erle Stanley Gardner	The Casebook of Sidney Zoom
2006	Edward D. Hoch	More Things Impossible
2006	Amy Myers	Murder, ’Orrible Murder
2006	Ellis Peters	The Trinity Cat
2006	Rafael Sabatini	The Evidence of the Sword
2006	Julian Symons	The Detections of Francis Quarles
2007	Lloyd Biggle	The Grandfather Rastin Mysteries (“Lost Classics Series”)
2007	Max Brand	Masquerade (“Lost Classics Series”)
2007	Mignon G. Eberhart	Dead Yesterday (“Lost Classics Series”)
2007	Ross Macdonald	The Archer Files
2007	Walter Satterthwait	The Mankiller of Pooejegai
2008	John Dickson Carr and Val Gielgud	13 to the Gallows
2008	Peter Lovesey	Murder on the Short List
2008	Richard Lupoff	Quintet
2008	Hugh Pentecost	The Battles of Jericho (“Lost Classics Series”)
2009	Anthony Boucher and Denis Green	The Casebook of Gregory Hood
2009	Victor Canning	The Minerva Club
2009	Vera Caspary	The Murder in the Stork Club
2009	James Powell	A Pocketful of Noses
2009	S. J. Rozan	A Tale About a Tiger
2009	Robert Silverberg and Randall Garrett	A Little Intelligence
2010	Erle Stanley Gardner	The Exploits of the Patent Leather Kid
2010	Michael Innes	Appleby Talks About Crime (Lost Classics Series)
2010	William Link	The Columbo Collection
2010	Philip Wylie	Ten Thousand Blunt Instruments (Lost Classics Series)
2011	Vincent Cornier	The Duel of Shadows
2011	Loren D. Estleman	Valentino
2011	Elizabeth Ferrars	The Casebook of Jonas P. Jonas
2011	Melodie Johnson; Melodie Johnson Howe	Shooting Hollywood
2014	Charlotte Armstrong	Night Call (Lost Classics Series)
2014	Edward D. Hoch	Nothing Is Impossible
2015	Phyllis Bentley	Chain of Witnesses (Lost Classics Series)
2015	Anthony Berkeley	The Avenging Chance (Enlarged edition with one additional story)
2015	Marilyn Todd	Swords, Sandals, and Sirens
2016	Detection Club	Motives for Murder, A Celebration of Peter Lovesey on His 80th Birthday
2016	Frederick Irving Anderson	The Purple Flame and Other Detective Stories
2016	Patrick Quentin	The Puzzles of Peter Duluth
2016	James Yaffe	My Mother, The Detective (Enlarged edition with one additional story)
2017	Anthony Gilbert	Sequel to Murder: The Cases of Arthur Crook and Other Mysteries (Lost Classics Series)
2017	Edward D. Hoch	All But Impossible: The Impossible Files of Dr. Sam Hawthorne
2018	Bill Brittain	The Man Who Read Mysteries
2018	Edward D. Hoch	Challenge the Impossible, The Last Casebook of Dr. Sam Hawthorne
2018	James Holding	The Zanzibar Shirt Mystery and Other Stories
2018	Elaine Viets	A Deal with the Devil and 13 Short Stories
2019	Edward D. Hoch	Hoch's Ladies
2019	Peter Lovesey	The Crime of Miss Oyster Brown and Other Stories
2019	Patrick Quentin	The Cases of Lieutenant Trant
2019		Silver Bullets: An anthology celebrating Crippen & Landru's 25th Anniversary
2020	John Dickson Carr	The Island of Coffins and Other Mysteries from the Casebook of Cabin B-13
2020	Erle Stanley Gardner	Hot Cash, Cold Clews: The Adventures of Lester Leith (Lost Classics Series)
2020	Edward D. Hoch	Funeral in the Fog: The Strange Mysteries of Simon Ark
2020	Art Taylor	The Boy Detective & The Summer of '74 and Other Tales of Suspense
2021	Freeman Wills Crofts	The 9.50 Up Express and Other Mysteries (Lost Classics Series)
2021	Robert Edward Eckels	Never Trust a Partner, The Con Games of Robert Edward Eckels
2021	William Link and Richard Levinson	Shooting Script and Other Mysteries
2021	Stuart Palmer	Hildegarde Withers: Final Riddles? (Lost Classics Series)
2021	Patrick Quentin	Hunt in the Dark and Other Fatal Pursuits (Lost Classics Series)
2022	Bill Brittain	The Man Who Solved Mysteries (Lost Classics Series)
2022	John Dickson Carr	The Kindling Spark: Early Tales of Mystery, Horror, and Adventure by John Dickson Carr
2022	John Creasey	Gideon and the Young Toughs and Other Stories (Lost Classics Series)
2022	Edward D. Hoch	Constant Hearses and Other Revolutionary Mysteries
2022	Ellery Queen and Josh Pachter	The Adventures of the Puzzle Club and Other Stories
2023	Art Taylor	The Adventure of the Castle Thief and Other Expeditions and Indiscretions
2023	Edith Maxwell	A Questionable Death and Other Historical Quaker Midwife Mysteries
2023	Edward D. Hoch	The Killer Everyone Knew and Other Captain Leopold Stories
2023	Donna Andrews and Greg Herren and Art Taylor	The School of Hard Knox
2023	Pierre Very	The Secret of the Pointed Tower
2024	Frances Lockridge	The Flair for Murder
2024	Toni LP Kelner	The Skeleton Rides a Horse and Other Stories
2024	Edward D. Hoch	The Will o' the Wisp Mystery
2024	Tom Mead	The Indian Rope Trick
2025	Marcia Talley	With Love, Marjorie Ann and Other Stories
2025	S.S. Van Dine	The Almost Perfect Crime and Other Mysteries
2025	Ethel Lina White	Blackout and Other Stories of Suspense
2025	Donna Andrews and Greg Herren and Art Taylor	Double Crossing Van Dine
2025	John M Floyd	River Road and Other Mystery Stories
2026	Jack Ritchie	Cardula and the Locked Rooms
2026	John Dickson Carr	The Unexpected Instinct by John Dickson Carr
2026	Edward D. Hoch	The Case of the Flying Graveyard
2026	Gigi Pandian and Tom Mead	All the Crime in the World
2026	Josephine Tey	The The Making of Josephine Tey
2026	Anna Scotti	The It's Not Even Past
