= Up Jumps the Devil =

1996 novel by Margaret Maron

- Author: Margaret Maron
- Language: English
- Genre: Mystery novel
- Publisher: Mysterious Press
- Publication date: September 10, 1996
- Publication place: United States
- Pages: 278
- ISBN: 0-89296-568-1
- Preceded by: Shooting at Loons
- Followed by: Killer Market

Up Jumps the Devil is a mystery novel by American author Margaret Maron, first published by Mysterious Press in 1996. The fourth in the Deborah Knott novel series, it follows the namesake North Carolina judge as she investigates close-to-home murders over the sale of farmland to land developers. It received praise from critics for its writing quality, characters, and detailed setting, culminating in winning the Agatha Award for Best Novel in 1996, despite some criticism of the mystery itself being lacking in comparison.

== Plot ==
Up Jumps the Devil follows Deborah Knott, a 36-year-old district judge in her home state of North Carolina. She is the youngest of twelve children, and the only daughter. They live out in the country, and there is growing pressure to sell their land to people moving in from the city. Deborah, her father (an ex-moonshiner), and some of her brothers (all of whom own land nearby) want to keep their land, while others are looking to sell, which causes tension in the family. Deborah is drawn into the investigation when their neighbor Dallas Stancil, an old friend of her father's from his moonshining days, is murdered by his stepson and wife after refusing to sell his land. This brings one of Dallas's cousins, Allen Stancil, back into town; he is Deborah's ex-husband from a brief marriage when she was 18 years old that she regrets immensely. When Dallas's father is murdered while figuring out how to divide the estate, Deborah tries to solve the mystery while also keeping her own family together as her hometown changes with the times, with multiple plausible suspects in the case.

== Publication history ==
Up Jumps the Devil was first published on September 10, 1996 by Mysterious Press. It is the fourth book in Margaret Maron's Deborah Knott novel series, which started with Bootlegger's Daughter in 1992. It was preceded by Shooting at Loons and followed by Killer Market in 1997.

== Reception ==
Up Jumps the Devil was frequently praised by critics for its characters and setting. Kirkus Reviews and the Sun-Sentinel's Oline Cogdill both considered Deborah's courtroom cases to be a highlight. Allyson Duncan of the News and Record enjoyed the political and social themes present in the changing era of the American south, as the role of land changed, in addition to the other Southern characteristics in the writing. Although The Atlanta Journal-Constitution's Kristina Brooks found that the family and political arguing about land ownership was often more in-depth than necessary, she still enjoyed the look into the local culture.

It received a starred review from Publishers Weekly for its detailed writing, characters, and plot. Kirkus Reviews considered the actual mystery plot to be less interesting than the interplay between the characters and the changing nature of the "New South". The actual mystery plot was frequently considered to be the least engaging part of the novel. San Francisco Chronicle mystery reviewer Peter Handel wondered why Maron was writing in the genre instead of focusing on the region and complicated cast of characters, while the Salisbury Post's Deirde Smith wrote that the mystery plot was "shortchange[d]" in favor of the family dynamics, though still positive on Maron's storytelling overall. Both agreed that the characters were so numerous it was often confusing, even among Deborah's family alone. Smith and Duncan both criticized for being unsatisfying, with the last chapter focusing on the family property rather than the mystery. Despite this, it was still critically successful, winning the Agatha Award for Best Novel in 1996.
