= Black Widow (1954 film) =

1954 film by Nunnally Johnson

- Theatrical release poster
- Directed by: Nunnally Johnson
- Screenplay by: Nunnally Johnson
- Story by: Hugh Wheeler
- Based on: Black Widow by Patrick Quentin
- Produced by: Nunnally Johnson
- Starring: Ginger Rogers; Van Heflin; Gene Tierney; George Raft
- Cinematography: Charles G. Clarke
- Edited by: Dorothy Spencer
- Music by: Leigh Harline
- Production company: 20th Century Fox
- Distributed by: 20th Century Fox
- Release date: October 28, 1954
- Running time: 95 minutes
- Country: United States
- Language: English
- Budget: $1 million
- Box office: $2.5 million (US rentals)

Black Widow is a 1954 American DeLuxe Color mystery film in CinemaScope, with elements of film noir, written, produced, and directed by Nunnally Johnson, based on the 1952 novel of the same name by Patrick Quentin. The film stars Ginger Rogers, Van Heflin, Gene Tierney, and George Raft.

== Plot ==
Peter Denver, a renowned Broadway producer, is attending a cocktail party hosted by the viciously haughty and celebrated actress Carlotta "Lottie" Marin and her quiet husband Brian Mullen when he meets Nancy "Nanny" Ordway.

The seemingly naïve Nanny, a 20-year-old aspiring writer, says she hopes to make it big in New York. She convinces a reluctant Peter to persuade his wife, Iris—another famous actress, who is temporarily out of town—to agree to Nanny's use of the couple's apartment to write in during the day. After the Denvers return from the airport and find Nanny hanging dead in their bathroom, a variety of people Nanny has recently met in New York begin to reveal deeper and darker connections with her. Lt. Bruce, the detective assigned to the case, soon discovers that this apparent suicide was in fact a homicide.

Further, he believes that Peter, who is suspected of having had an affair with Nanny, is the murderer. Peter evades arrest and seeks clues to discover the real murderer. The case becomes further complicated when he and Lt. Bruce independently realize that Nanny's dealings in New York belie her apparent innocence.

Nanny had recently stayed for a time with her uncle and then moved in with a woman roommate, whose brother she evidently had agreed to marry. A series of flashbacks reveal that Nanny was craftily piecing together a scheme that would help her both to climb the social ladder and to later conceal the identity of her secret lover by falsely implicating Peter. This mysterious romance is confirmed by an autopsy, which reveals that Nanny was pregnant at the time of her death.

Everyone Nanny knows is suddenly a suspect in the murder case, including Lottie and Brian, who live in the same apartment building as the Denvers. In the end, Brian can no longer keep silent and reveals to his friend Peter that he was Nanny's secret lover, but swears that he did not kill her. Having bugged Brian's apartment, Lt. Bruce barges in and charges Brian with the homicide. Lottie finally admits that she murdered Nanny for having had the affair with her husband, whom she later intended to blackmail. Lottie staged the death as a suicide.

== Cast ==
- Ginger Rogers as Carlotta "Lottie" Marin
- Van Heflin as Peter Denver
- Gene Tierney as Iris Denver
- George Raft as Detective Lt. C. A. Bruce
- Peggy Ann Garner as Nancy "Nanny" Ordway
- Reginald Gardiner as Brian Mullen
- Virginia Leith as Claire Amberly
- Otto Kruger as Gordon Ling
- Cathleen Nesbitt as Mrs. Lucia Colletti
- Skip Homeier as John Amberly
- Hilda Simms as Anne
- Mabel Albertson as Sylvia (uncredited)
- Bea Benaderet as Mrs. Walsh (uncredited)

== Production ==
=== Development ===
20th Century Fox bought the film rights to Patrick Quentin's 1952 novel Black Widow. Studio head Darryl Zanuck assigned the project to Nunnally Johnson, who worked on it after writing the script for How to Marry a Millionaire (1953). Johnson then made his debut as director on Night People (1954) starring Gregory Peck, and Peck was announced as the Black Widow male lead, which was, however, eventually played—after being passed on by William Holden—by Van Heflin. Johnson said the film would be the "All About Eve of suspense pictures." He later said it "was just a thriller, wasn't any great harm done in the thing, a thriller that I liked, because I like thrillers."

Johnson had offered the role of flamboyant stage actress Carlotta Marin to stage actress Tallulah Bankhead, Johnson's first choice for the role, then to Joan Crawford, who was not interested. Bankhead had declined the role as too small; it was successfully offered to Ginger Rogers (whose role in Johnson's 1952 production We're Not Married! had also been declined by Bankhead). Rogers was accorded top billing in Black Widow.

Johnson's first choice for the role of Nanny Ordway, 20th-Century-Fox-contractee Maggie McNamara, was cast in the role but soon sidelined by illness, with her Three Coins in the Fountain co-star Jean Peters being expected to replace her. However, the role of Nanny Ordway would ultimately afford a brief cinematic comeback to former child star (at 20th Century Fox) Peggy Ann Garner. Johnson had tested Garner for Black Widow on the recommendation of cinematographer Charles G. Clarke who, while overseeing location footage for Black Widow in New York City, had happened to cross paths with Garner, with whom he had worked on Junior Miss nine years earlier. Johnson said he took Garner "much to my regret... she was a tiresome little girl. Tiresome woman."

Johnson did successfully recruit George Raft, known for his gangster roles, to play against type as an investigating police officer.

=== Shooting ===
According to Johnson, Raft would show up on set word-perfect and looking no older at age fifty-four than he had at age thirty-nine. Johnson said Raft "learns his lines very well... he's not an actor in particular. He was a personality that was very well fitted for that period. If you'll remember, he felt very pleased with himself this time because he played a cop. He was on the law side. He's a nice guy to be with."

== Reception ==
According to Kinematograph Weekly it was a "money maker" at the British box office in 1955.

When the film was released, The New York Times film critic Bosley Crowther panned the screenplay and the actors, writing that "Black Widow, which was discovered at the Roxy yesterday, bears little or no resemblance to the recent local spider scourge, except that it is moderately intriguing and considerably overplayed. It is merely an average whodunit, stretched out on the CinemaScope screen and performed by a fancy cast of actors so that it looks more important than it is ... The major fly in the ointment—or, should we say, in the web—is Peggy Ann Garner, playing the little Southern girl. Miss Garner's endeavors to give out with a rush of peach-blossom charm are beclouded with affectation. And the idea that she could be the greedy and ruthless little vixen that is finally revealed is hard to believe ... And, finally, the shrill and shoddy character that Ginger Rogers plays—a poison-tongued Broadway actress—is indifferently written and performed. It is asking a lot of an audience to believe that she could display anything but clothes. George Raft as a poker-faced detective acts with flat-toned indifference, too, and Gene Tierney and Reginald Gardiner barely manage to live through their roles."

Film critic Dennis Schwartz panned the film in 2008, opining, "It's a flimsy story that is apathetically written, poorly paced and overacted with shrill performances by both Ginger Rogers and Peggy Ann Garner. The B-film crime drama might have been better served as a cheapie production, with some of its filler scenes lopped off."

Craig Butler, however, reviewing it for AllMovie, called the film "entertaining" and noted that the "cinematography is frequently stunning". He refers to some "marvelous dialogue", noting "the film moves along at a nice, steady clip" and stating that "it's enough fun that most viewers will overlook …[the] flaws". He praised Garner and Rogers, noting the latter's "standout performance".
