= The X Street Murders =

"The X Street Murders" is a locked room mystery short story by Joseph Commings, featuring his detective Brooks U. Banner.

== Plot summary ==
The story begins on X Street in Washington, D.C., where the New Zealand legation is located. Caroll Lockyear walks out of the legation at 11:29. The secretary, Gertrude Wagner, writes down an appointment that Lockyear has for next week with Mr. Gosling. On her desk is a sealed envelope containing something heavy that is inscribed, Deliver to Mr. Kermit Gosling, at 11:30 a.m. sharp. As Lockyear leaves, Gertrude walks past Captain Cozzens and Alvin Odel, whose job it is to watch Gosling's office. Gertrude opens the door, and three shots ring out. Gosling has three bullet holes in him, and he is dying. Odel and Cozzens run in, asking "Where is the gun?" Gertrude opens the envelope on her desk, and a wisp of smoke comes out. The gun that killed Gosling had been sitting on Gertrude's desk in a sealed envelope since it was delivered earlier that morning.

Senator Banner is at The Idle Hour Club when a letter calls him to the legation to lend his investigative talents. The gun is revealed to be a Russian Tokarev. Banner investigates, and discovers the envelope was delivered at 10 a.m. by a 10-year-old kid who didn't say whether it had been given to him by a man or a woman. The envelope was untouched until it was taken to Gosling's room.

Gertrude is stalked by Odel, who is convinced she is the killer. Gertrude tries to convince him that she is not the killer but Odel believes it is her, because she is from East Germany. Gertrude leaves, but before she does, she slips Odel a piece of paper with two circles on it; a small one inside a big one. Gertrude leaves, and meets up with the real killer, on X Street, who shoots her to death.

A patrolman finds Gertrude's body. The gun that shot her is revealed to be an American .38. Odel shows Banner the drawing of a circle within a circle. Banner rushes McKitrick and the group to the legation, where he is waiting. As they arrive, Banner gives everyone the answer. They search the legation, looking for a recording tape, which is found in a light socket. Banner has them arrest Caroll Lockyear.

Banner reveals that Gertrude was being forced to help Lockyear with his murder plot. Lockyear was a Communist agent, and Gertrude's mother and father were stuck in East Germany. Lockyear claimed he could get them out, but threatened to have them killed unless she helped him. Using a tape recorder, Lockyear recorded three minutes of silence, then fired three shots with the Tokarev, then recorded more silence. The day he killed Gosling, Lockyear arranged for the delivery of an envelope containing a toy gun to Gertrude's desk. He then went to the legation with a briefcase that had an identical empty envelope in it, and a silenced Tokarev. He stalled Gosling until a time as close to 11:30 as possible, then shot him and started the tape recording. Lockyear sealed the gun into the empty envelope. As Lockyear left, he put his briefcase on Gertrude's desk, holding the envelope against it. He picked the other envelope on Gertrude's desk up and replaced it with the envelope holding the real gun. After the shots on the tape recording were heard, when everyone was examining Gosling's body, Gertrude shut off the tape recorder. She had drawn the two circles to draw attention to a reel of recording tape. Lockyear killed her, thinking she had already destroyed the tape.
