= Joseph Commings =

American writer

Joseph Commings (New York, 1913 - Maryland, 1992) was an American writer of locked room mysteries. He wrote a series of soft-core sex novels, but is best known for his locked-room mystery/impossible crime short stories featuring Senator Brooks U. Banner.

Commings began writing in 1947, and was first published in 10-Story Detective magazine in March, 1947. After three stories, Commings also began writing for Ten Detective Aces. For some reason, the editors of both magazines thought it would be a good idea to have a different detective. Commings merely changed the name of Banner to Mayor Thomas Landin, but kept everything else the same. All stories that were first printed in Ten Detective Aces and that have since been reprinted have changed the name of Landin back to Banner.

By the 1950s, Commings submitted stories to Ellery Queen's Mystery Magazine, but Frederic Dannay (half of the writing/editorial team known as Ellery Queen) didn't like the character of Banner, so Commings was never printed in EQMM. It wouldn't be until 1957 that Commings would be able to print another Banner story.

In 1957, Commings published stories in an offbeat mystery magazine, Mystery Digest. It was during this time that Commings would write his best-known story, "The X Street Murders". Commings would continue to be published in Mystery Digest until it went bankrupt, his last story being The Giant's Sword in 1963.

Commings would publish a few stories in The Saint Mystery Magazine until 1968. Commings would also publish a series of part crime/part sex novels. Commings attempted to write normal mystery novels, and locked room mystery novels, none of which was published. It wouldn't be until 1979, in Mike Shayne Mystery Magazine, that Commings would publish another Banner story, cowritten by Edward D. Hoch. (Commings was a friend of both John Dickson Carr and Edward D. Hoch.) Commings would continue to publish in MSMM until 1984; he died in 1992. The last Banner story, "The Whispering Gallery", was not published until 2004, in the collection Banner Deadlines, published by Crippen & Landru.

== List of Senator Banner short stories ==
- "Murder Under Glass"
- "Fingerprint Ghost"
- "The Spectre on The Lake"
- "The Black Friar Murders"
- "The Scarecrow Murders"
- "Death By Black Magic"
- "Ghost in the Gallery"
- "The Invisible Clue"
- "Serenade to a Killer"
- "The Female Animal"
- "The Bewitched Terrace"
- "Through the Looking Glass"
- "Three Chamberpots"
- "Murderer's Progress"
- "A Lady of Quality"
- "Castanets, Canaries, and Murder"
- "The X Street Murders"
- "Open to Danger"
- "Hangman's House"
- "Betrayal in the Night"
- "The Giant's Sword"
- "The Last Samurai"
- "The Cuban Blonde"
- "The Glass Gravestone"
- "The Moving Finger"
- "Stairway to Nowhere" (with Edward D. Hoch)
- "Nobody Loves a Fatman"
- "Assassination-Middle East"
- "Dressed to Kill"
- "Murder of a Mermaid"
- "The Fire Dragon Caper"
- "The Grand Guignol Caper" (also known as "The Vampire in the Iron Mask")
- "The Whispering Gallery" (first published in "Banner Deadlines")
