= Amy Myers =

British mystery writer (born 1938)

Amy Myers (born 3 August 1938) is a British mystery writer. She is best known for her Marsh and Daughter mystery series, featuring a writing team consisting of a wheel-chair bound ex-policeman and his daughter, and for another series, featuring a Victorian era chef, Auguste Didier. Myers' books have been favourably reviewed in Library Journal, Publishers Weekly, Booklist, and Kirkus Reviews. Myers has also been published many times in Ellery Queen's Mystery Magazine. Janet Hutchings, the magazine's longtime editor, called Myers "one of our best and most frequent contributors of historicals" (i.e., historical mysteries).

== Personal life ==
Myers was born in Barnehurst, Kent (part of Greater London since 1965) in 1938. While working in publishing, Myers met her American soon-to-be husband. She oversaw the publication of an autobiography by the English bullfighter Henry Higgins; she met him, his co-author and the co-author's cousin, James Myers. Myers was born in Buffalo, New York, US, but had spent his adult life in Europe.

For ten years, the Myers maintained a commuter marriage, dividing their time between Paris, where James worked, and London, where Amy worked. During her stays in Paris, Myers dreamed up the character for her first mystery series, Auguste Didier, a half-English, half-French chef who reluctantly dabbled in detection during the late Victorian and Edwardian periods. The couple now live in Kent full-time.

== Writing career ==
Like the character Luke Frost in Myers' Marsh and Daughter series, Myers was once a publisher. She was a director of the now-defunct publishing firm of William Kimber & Co. Ltd., which specialised in war and theatrical memoirs, autobiographies, biographies and tales of hauntings. She published her first mystery, Murder in Pug's Parlor, in 1986. In 1988, she turned to writing full-time.

After eleven Auguste Didier mysteries, Myers introduced the former police detective Peter Marsh and his daughter Georgia in The Wickenham Murders in 2004. The father–daughter team writes true-crime novels in which they expose an injustice or sleuth out the answer to an unsolved crime from the distant past.# The Marshes' investigations almost inevitably involve them with present-day murders stemming from secrets involving the past.

Myers launched a third series in 2007 with Tom Wasp and the Murdered Stunner. Wasp, a Victorian era chimney sweep in East London, solves crimes with his former apprentice, Ned. Myers' fourth series, written with the help of her car buff husband, began in 2011 with Classic in the Barn. That series features a modern-day classic-car restorer in Kent, Jack Colby, who helps the police with cases involving classic cars.

In 2017, Myers introduced yet another cosy mystery series, featuring Nell Drury, a female French-trained chef in 1925 Kent when such a thing was a real anomaly. The first novel is titled Dancing with Death.

For her romances, historical sagas and suspense novels, Myers created the pseudonym Harriet Hudson, although she has occasionally also used the names Laura Daniels and Alice Carr.

Myers also writes reviews of other books at the online crime and thriller magazine Shots.

Many of her crime novels are available in German translation.

== Mystery novels ==
Auguste Didier series

- 1986 Murder in Pug's Parlour
- 1986 Murder in the Limelight
- 1989 Murder at the Masque
- 1991 Murder Makes an Entree
- 1992 Murder Under the Kissing Bough
- 1994 Murder in the Smokehouse
- 1995 Murder at the Music Hall
- 1996 Murder in the Motor Stable
- 1999 Murder with Majesty
- 2000 Murder in the Queen's Boudoir

Marsh and Daughter series

- 2004 The Wickenham Murders
- 2005 Murder in Friday Street
- 2006 Murder in Hell's Corner
- 2007 Murder and the Golden Goblet
- 2008 Murder in the Mist
- 2009 Murder Takes the Stage
- 2010 Murder on the Old Road
- 2011 Murder in Abbot's Folly
- 2022 The Maid of Kent Murders

Tom Wasp series

- 2007 Tom Wasp and the Murdered Stunner
- 2010 Tom Wasp and the Newgate Knocker
- 2019 Tom Wasp and the Seven Deadly Sins

Classic Car series

- 2011 Classic in the Barn
- 2012 Classic in the Clouds
- 2012 Classic Calls the Shots
- 2013 Classic Mistake
- 2014 Classic in the Pits
- 2015 Classic Cashes In
- 2015 Classic in the Dock
- 2016 Classic at Bay

Nell Drury series

- 2017 Dancing with Death
- 2018 Death at the Wychbourne Follies
- 2020 Death and the Singing Birds

Under the pseudonym Harriet Hudson

- 1989 Look for Me by Moonlight
- 1991 When Nightingales Sang
- 1992 The Wooing of Katie May
- 1993 The Girl from Gadsby's
- 1998 Into the Sunlight
- 1999 Not in our Stars
- 2000 The Sun in Glory
- 2000 To My Own Desire
- 2001 Quinn
- 2002 Tomorrow's Garden
- 2003 Catching the Sunlight
- 2005 Applemere Summer
- 2007 The Windy Hill
- 2007 The Stationmaster's Daughter
- 2010 The Man Who Came Back

The Ashden Quartet (set in the English homefront during the First World War at the rectory in the Sussex village of Ashden)

- 1996 The Last Summer (under the pseudonym Alice Carr)
- 1999 Dark Harvest (under the pseudonym Alice Carr)
- 1999 Winter Roses (under the pseudonym Harriet Hudson)
- 2001 Songs of Spring (under the pseudonym Harriet Hudson)

Under the pseudonym Laura Daniels

- 1995 Pleasant Vices
- 1995 The Lakenham Folly

Short story collections

- 2006 Murder, 'Orrible Murder! Published by Crippen & Landru
