= John Dunning (detective fiction author) =

American novelist (1942–2023)

- Born: January 9, 1942; New York City, U.S.
- Died: May 22, 2023 (aged 81)
- Occupation: Novelist
- Spouse: Helen Rose Korupp
- Writing career
- Genres: Detective fiction, mystery

John Dunning (January 9, 1942 – May 22, 2023) was an American writer of non-fiction and detective fiction. He was known for his reference books on old-time radio and his series of mysteries featuring Denver bookseller and ex-policeman Cliff Janeway.

== Early life and career ==
Born in Brooklyn, New York, in 1942, Dunning moved to his father's hometown of Charleston, South Carolina, at the age of three. In 1964 he left his parents' home and moved to Denver, Colorado, where, after a time working as a stable hand at a horse racing track, he got a job at The Denver Post. In 1970 he left the newspaper and took up writing, while pursuing a variety of jobs. Partly because of trouble with his publishers, in 1984 he stopped writing and opened a store specializing in second-hand and rare books called the Old Algonquin Bookstore. At the urging of fellow authors, he returned to the world of writing and in 1992 his first Cliff Janeway mystery novel, Booked to Die was published. In 1994 he closed the store and with his wife continued it as an internet and mail order business called Old Algonquin Books.

=== Radio ===
In addition to compiling encyclopedic reference books about the history of radio programming, Dunning hosted a long-running weekly radio show, Old-Time Radio.

=== Awards ===
Dunning received his first award nomination in 1981, when Looking for Ginger North received an Edgar Award nomination for "Best Paperback Original". The following year, Deadline was nominated for this same honor.

Dunning's novel Booked to Die won the Nero Award and was nominated for the 1993 Anthony Award in the "Best Novel" category. The follow-up to this novel, The Bookman's Wake, was nominated for the 1996 Edgar Award in the "Best Novel" running.

== Personal life and death ==
On May 30, 1969, Dunning married Helen Rose Korupp.

Dunning died on May 22, 2023, at the age of 81, after a long period suffering from dementia, stemming from a brain tumor diagnosed in 2006.

== Works ==
=== Cliff Janeway novels ===
- Booked to Die (1992)
- The Bookman's Wake (1995)
- The Bookman's Promise (2004)
- The Sign of the Book (2005)
- The Bookwoman's Last Fling (2006)

=== Other detective novels ===
- The Holland Suggestions (1975)
- Looking for Ginger North (1980)
- Two O'Clock Eastern Wartime (2001)

=== Other novels ===
- Denver (1980)
- Deadline (1981)

=== Nonfiction ===
- Tune in Yesterday: The Ultimate Encyclopedia of Old-Time Radio, 1925–1976 (1976)
- On the Air: The Encyclopedia of Old-Time Radio (1998)
