= Margaret Maron =

American crime fiction writer (1938–2021)

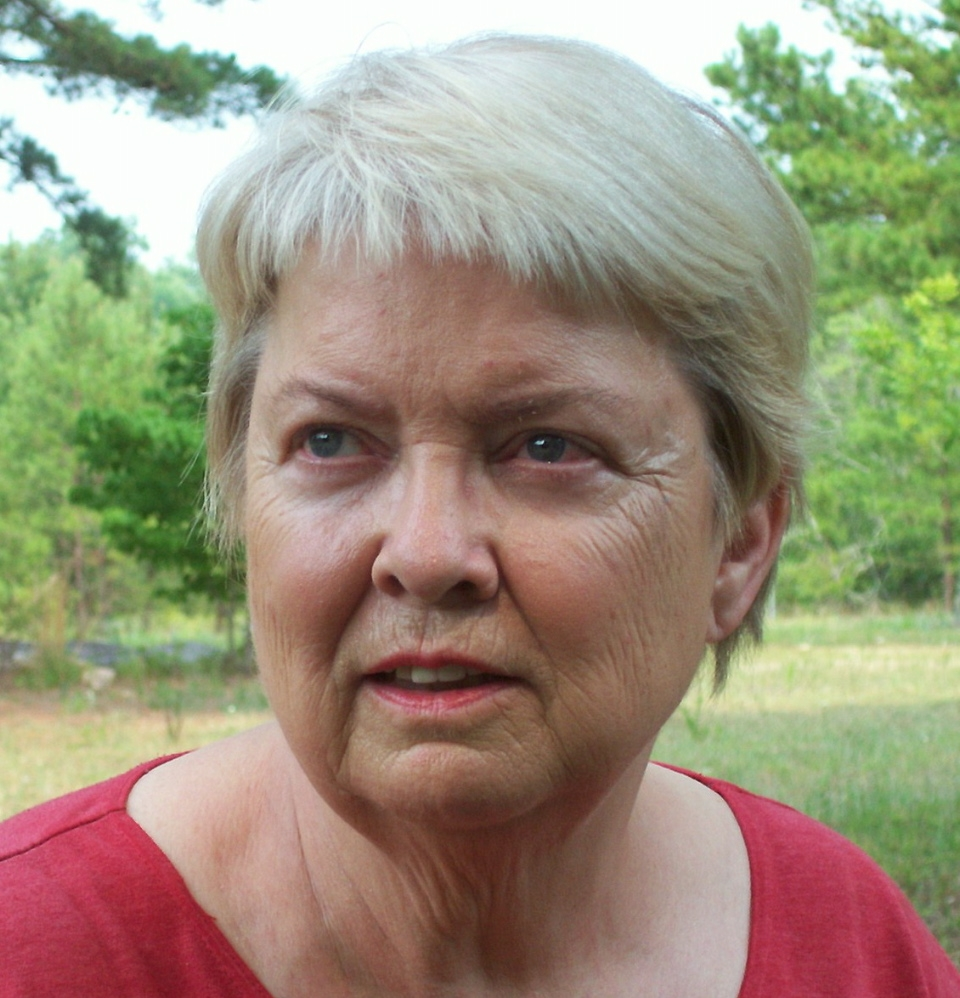
- Born: Margaret Brown; August 25, 1938; Greensboro, North Carolina, U.S.
- Died: February 23, 2021 (aged 82); Raleigh, North Carolina, U.S.
- Occupation: Novelist
- Spouse: Joseph John Maron (m. 1959)
- Children: 1
- Writing career
- Language: English
- Period: 1981–2021
- Genre: Mystery
- Notable works: Deborah Knott series, Sigrid Harald series
- Website: margaretmaron.com

Margaret Maron (née Brown; August 25, 1938 – February 23, 2021) was an American writer, the author of award-winning mystery novels.

== Biography ==
Maron was born in Greensboro, North Carolina, and grew up in central Johnston County; she had also lived in Italy. She and her husband, artist Joe Maron, lived in Brooklyn before returning to her home state in 1972. Maron died of complications from a stroke.

== Career ==
=== Writing ===
Maron was the author of numerous short stories and more than 20 mystery novels. One series of novels features Sigrid Harald, a loner lieutenant in the NYPD whose policeman father was killed in the line of duty when she was a toddler (The Right Jack: a Sigrid Harald Mystery). Another series follows the adventures of Judge Deborah Knott, attorney and daughter of an infamous North Carolina bootlegger.

Her works have been translated into a dozen languages and are on the reading lists of many courses in contemporary Southern literature, as well as Crime and Mystery literature courses.

=== Professional activities ===
Maron was a founding member and past president of Sisters in Crime and of the American Crime Writers' League, and a director on the national board for Mystery Writers of America. She was a keynote speaker at the Great Manhattan Mystery Conclave in 2004.

== Awards and recognition ==
Maron received a number of awards for her work from the various awarding bodies of the mystery fiction genre.

Her first novel to receive recognition was Corpus Christmas, which was nominated for the 1989 Agatha Award and the 1990 Anthony Award in the "Best Novel" category. Her first short story to be met with critical acclaim was "Deborah's Judgment", which won the 1991 Agatha Award and was also nominated for the Anthony Award and the Macavity Award the following year for "Best Short-story".

Her novel Bootlegger's Daughter won the 1992 Agatha and the Anthony, Edgar and Macavity awards for "Best Novel" the following year. Additionally in 1993, Maron's short story "...That Married Dear Old Dad" was nominated for the "Best Short-story" Agatha and her novel Southern Discomfort was nominated for the "Best Novel" Agatha award. Southern Discomfort was again honoured the following year, picking up a nomination at the 1994 Anthony Awards, again for "Best Novel".

Up Jumps The Devil won the 1996 "Best Novel" Agatha Award; two years later her novel Home Fires was nominated for this same honour, as well as a Macavity nomination in 1999. 2000 brought yet another Agatha Award nomination for Storm Track. Short story "Virgo in Sapphires" was nominated for the 2001 Agatha, the 2002 Edgar and the 2002 Anthony Awards in the "Best Short-story" category; the latter being the same year that another of her short-stories, "The Dog That Didn't Bark", won the Agatha Award.

Last Lessons of Summer was nominated for an Agatha Award in 2003; High Country Fall was nominated for an Agatha Award in 2004 and also picked up a Macavity nomination the following year, the same year in which her novel Rituals of the Season picked up yet another Agatha nomination. Hard Row also received an Agatha Award nomination, this time in 2007. Three-Day Town won the 2011 Agatha Award for "Best Novel".

In 2006, North Carolina Governor Michael F. Easley named Maron to the Order of the Long Leaf Pine, the state's highest civilian honor. Maron received an honorary doctorate from and gave the commencement address to the University of North Carolina at Greensboro in May 2010, where she was a student for two years. In 2016, she was inducted into the North Carolina Literary Hall of Fame.

== Published works ==
=== Judge Deborah Knott series ===
1. Bootlegger's Daughter, 1992
2. Southern Discomfort, 1993
3. Shooting at Loons, 1994
4. Up Jumps the Devil, 1996
5. Killer Market, 1997
6. Home Fires, 1998
7. Storm Track, 2000
8. Uncommon Clay, 2001
9. Slow Dollar, 2002
10. High Country Fall, 2004
11. Rituals of the Season, 2005
12. Winter's Child, 2006
13. Hard Row, 2007
14. Death’s Half-Acre, 2008
15. Sand Sharks, 2009
16. Christmas Mourning, 2010
17. Three-Day Town, 2011 (cross-over with Sigrid Harald)
18. The Buzzard Table, 2012
19. Designated Daughters, 2014
20. Long Upon the Land, 2015

=== Sigrid Harald series ===
1. One Coffee With, 1981
2. Death of a Butterfly, 1984
3. Death in Blue Folders, 1985
4. The Right Jack, 1987
5. Baby Doll Games, 1988
6. Corpus Christmas, 1989
7. Past Imperfect, 1991
8. Fugitive Colors, 1995
9. Take Out, 2017

=== Non-series ===
Novels

- Bloody Kin, 1985 (prequel to Judge Deborah Knott series; First "Colleton County" book)
- Last Lessons of Summer, 2003

==== Collections and anthologies ====
| Title | Contents | Publication Date | Publisher |
|---|---|---|---|
| Shoveling Smoke | | 1997 | Crippen & Landru |
| Suitable for Hanging | The Early Retirement of Mario Colletti; Devil's Island; To Hide a Tree; Croquet's Summer "That Married Dear Old Dad"; Craquelure; Lost and Found; Shaggy Dog; No, I'm Not Jane Marple, But Since You Ask; The Stupid Pet Trick; Roman's Holiday; Half of Something; Growth Marks; Virgo in Sapphires; The Third Element; What's in a Name; Mixed Blessings; Till 3:45; The Choice; The Dog that Didn't Bark | 2004 | Crippen & Landru |
| Crimes By Moonlight | Small Change | 2010 | Berkley Publishing (ebook) |
