= Diane Mott Davidson =

American novelist

- Born: March 22, 1949 (age 77); Honolulu, Territory of Hawaii
- Education: Art History & Political Science
- Alma mater: Stanford University (BA); Johns Hopkins University (MA)
- Occupation: Novelist
- Writing career
- Language: English
- Notable work: Goldy Schulz series
- Notable awards: 1993 Anthony Award
- Website: www.facebook.com/DianeMottDavidson/

Diane Mott Davidson (born March 22, 1949) is an American author of mystery novels that use the theme of food, an idea she got from Robert B. Parker. Several recipes are included in each book, and each novel title is a play on a food or drink word. Her story, "Cold Turkey", won the 1993 Anthony Award for "Best Short-story".

== Biography ==
Mott Davidson studied political science at Wellesley College and lived across the hall from Hillary Clinton. In a few of her novels (particularly, The Cereal Murders), she references a prestigious eastern women's college that her sleuth, Goldy Schulz, attended before transferring to the University of Colorado Boulder. In real life, Mott Davidson transferred from Wellesley and eventually graduated from Stanford University.

== Career ==
The main character in Mott Davidson's novels is Goldy Schulz, a small town caterer who also solves murder mysteries in her spare time. At the start of the series, Goldy is a recently divorced mother with a young son trying to make a living as a caterer in the fictional town of Aspen Meadow, CO. As the series progresses, new characters are introduced that change Goldy's professional and personal life. Robin Vidimos noted that Aspen Meadow, CO, closely resembles a real Colorado town, Evergreen, where Mott Davidson resides with her family.

The series has included 17 books, as of 2013. The first 12 books interwove recipes with the novel's text. When a dish is first described in the novel, the relevant recipe followed within the next few pages. Double Shot, the 12th novel, marked a change in the publishing of these recipes. In Double Shot, all recipes are compiled and printed at the end of the novel.

She was the guest of honor at the 2007 Great Manhattan Mystery Conclave in Manhattan, Kansas.

== Awards ==
- Mott Davidson was nominated for both the 1991 Anthony Award and the 1990 Agatha Award for Catering to Nobody in the "Best First Novel" category.
- Her story, "Cold Turkey", won the 1993 Anthony Award for "Best Short-story".

== Bibliography ==
=== Culinary series ===
1. Catering to Nobody (1990)
2. Dying for Chocolate (1993)
3. The Cereal Murders (1994)
4. The Last Suppers (1995)
5. Killer Pancake (1996)
6. The Main Corpse (1997)
7. The Grilling Season (1998)
8. Prime Cut (2000)
9. Tough Cookie (2001)
10. Sticks and Scones (2002)
11. Chopping Spree (2003)
12. Double Shot (2005)
13. Dark Tort (2007)
14. Sweet Revenge (2008)
15. Fatally Flaky (2009)
16. Crunch Time (2011)
17. The Whole Enchilada (2013)

=== Non-fiction ===
Goldy’s Kitchen Cookbook: Cooking, Writing, Family, Life (2015)
