= Fingerprint Ghost =

Short story by Joseph Commings

Fingerprint Ghost is a locked room mystery short story by American writer Joseph Commings, featuring his detective Brooks U. Banner.

== Plot summary ==
Senator Brooks U. Banner is making a phone call outside the Sphinx club, when he hears angry yelling a few booths down. Magician Larry Drollen is arguing with someone, telling them he has no more need for them. Seeing Banner is looking at him, Drollen turns, and simply says "Murder". Drollen then tells him the story of Gabriel Garrett, a doctor who was stabbed with a silver handled knife that had no finger prints on it. Garrets wife Ivy, and his aunt Letitia Cody want the case to be resolved, and hire fake medium Ted Wesley to perform a seance. Wesley claims for a fee, he can bring back Garrett's spirit, and have him point out the murderer. During the seance, the table rattles, there are strange voices, but nothing comes out of it. Larry Drollen tells Wesley he can produce something better, and if he can, Wesley has to give Ive and Letitia their money back. The seance is at 11, and the District Attorney Arcibald Lang, will be attending.

Everybody is at Ted Wesley's parlor at 11. Drollen is tied into a large walnut chair, that is attached to a cabinet, in front of a circle of 4 chairs. The silver knife is held by Drollen briefly, and then put in the cabinet. Lang's subordinate Shannon brings in straitjackets, and straps everyone in. He then locks them all in. Drollen tells everyone to be quiet, but after a while, the others wonder what is going on. Asking Drollen, he doesn't respond. Upon the door opening, it can be seen Drollen has been stabbed, and everyone is in a straitjacket. The police are called, and take the knife, looking for fingerprints, they find one. But it belongs to no one in the room.

Banner goes to see Archer the next day, and finds out what happened at the seance. Everyone had their feet touching each others, and no one felt anyone get up. The fingerprint is worthless, because it does not belong to anyone. There is also a palm print, but it is blurred from the knife slipping. Archer reveals that even though Ivy had the body cremated, Garrett's fingerprints did not match, so the killer was not a ghost. All of the people were in straitjackets, and there was nowhere to hide an animal, meaning, no one could do it.

The police find out that Garrett was killed by a snowbird named Mulik. Mulik was not at the seance, so he is not the killer. Banner then reveals that while Drollen's secretary was going through old news clippings, she found out that Drollen was married to a sideshow freak. Banner, unsure of where this works in, invites Ivy and Wesley to lunch. A redhaired girl snaps Ivy's picture, causing her to go loose-jointed, and faint. After she come to, Banner figures out she is pregnant.

The next afternoon, Banner invites into Lang's office, Ivy, Wesley, Lang, and Letitia. Banner then reveals he knows exactly how it happened. In the reversal of John Dickson Carr's The Crooked Hinge, Banner reveals that Ivy killed Drollen without using her arms. Ivy was wearing loose shoes, so she easily slipped them off while still in the straitjacket. The fingerprint on the knife didn't match, because it wasn't a fingerprint, but was a toeprint, from where Ivy held the knife with her feet. Ivy killed Drollen, because they had been married years ago. But then they drifted apart, and Ivy committed bigamy. Now, Garrett's baby is on the way, so she begged Drollen to take her back. Drollen refused on the phone and threatened to reveal Ivy's bigamy to the public, so Ivy killed him. Ivy, having heard the revelation, takes Lang's gun and shoots herself.
