= Patrick Quentin =

Pen name for various American novelists

Patrick Quentin, Q. Patrick and Jonathan Stagge were pen names under which Hugh Callingham Wheeler (19 March 1912 – 26 July 1987), Richard Wilson Webb (August 1901 – December 1966), Martha Mott Kelley (30 April 1906 – 2005) and Mary Louise White Aswell (3 June 1902 – 24 December 1984) wrote detective fiction. In some foreign countries their books have been published under the variant Quentin Patrick. Most of the stories were written by Webb and Wheeler in collaboration, or by Wheeler alone. Their most famous creation is the amateur sleuth Peter Duluth. In 1963, the story collection The Ordeal of Mrs. Snow was given a Special Edgar Award by the Mystery Writers of America. In 1949, the book Puzzle for Pilgrims won the Grand Prix de Littérature Policière International Prize, the most prestigious award for crime and detective fiction in France.

== History ==
In 1931, Martha Mott Kelley and Richard Wilson Webb collaborated on the detective novel Cottage Sinister. Kelley was known as Patsy (Patsy Kelly was a well-known character actress of that era) and Webb—an Englishman (born 1901 in Burnham-on-Sea, Somerset) who worked for a pharmaceutical company in Philadelphia—was known as Rick, so they created the pseudonym Q. Patrick by combining their nicknames—adding the Q "because it was unusual".

Webb and Kelley's literary partnership soon ended, with Kelley's marriage to Stephen Shipley Wilson. Webb continued to write under the Q. Patrick name, while looking for a new writing partner. He wrote one novel with the journalist and Harper's Bazaar editor Mary Louise Aswell, before he found his permanent collaborator in Hugh Wheeler, a Londoner who had moved to the US in 1934.

Wheeler's and Webb's first collaboration was published in 1936. That same year, they introduced two new pseudonyms: Murder Gone to Earth, the first novel featuring Dr. Westlake, was credited to Jonathan Stagge, a name they would continue to use for the rest of the Westlake series. A Puzzle for Fools introduced Peter Duluth and was signed Patrick Quentin. This would become their primary and most famous pen name, even though they also continued to use Q. Patrick until the end of their collaboration (particularly for Inspector Trant stories).

In the late 1940s, Webb's contributions gradually decreased due to health problems. From the 1950s and on, Wheeler continued writing as Patrick Quentin on his own, and also had one book published under his own name. In the 1960s and '70s, Wheeler achieved success as a playwright and librettist, and his output as Quentin Patrick slowed and then ceased altogether after 1965.

== Writing ==
The early Q. Patrick detective stories generally follow the Golden Age "whodunit" conventions, with elaborate puzzle mysteries reminiscent of Agatha Christie or John Dickson Carr. In the 1940s, the stories start to move away from the traditional detective pattern: Puzzle for Fiends is a Hitchcockian thriller, Puzzle for Pilgrims a noir novel, and Run to Death a pulpy spy novel.

The majority of the Webb–Wheeler collaborations feature one of their recurring characters: Peter Duluth, a Broadway director, WWII veteran and recovering alcoholic who, with his wife Iris, always seems to stumble across murders; Inspector Timothy Trant of the New York City Police, a Princeton University-educated dandy whose remorseless investigations often seem to be aimed at some innocent person before he reveals his real target; and the country doctor, Dr. Hugh Cavendish Westlake with his daughter Dawn. When Webb bowed out on the writing, these characters disappeared or receded into the background.

A study of all the Q.Patrick/Patrick Quentin/Jonathan Stagge novels has appeared in French, Patrick Quentin: Du roman-probleme au Thriller Psychologique by Roland Lacourbe, Vincent Bourgeois, Phillippe Fooz and Michel Soupart (France: Semper Aenigma, 2016).

== Legacy ==
Francis Iles called Quentin "number one among American crime writers".

A few of Quentin's stories have been filmed (see below), most notably the Peter Duluth mystery Black Widow, which was filmed under that title by Twentieth Century Fox in 1954 as a color Cinemascope feature. Van Heflin portrayed the Peter Duluth character, who was renamed Peter Denver.

== Works variously by Richard Wilson Webb, Hugh Wheeler, Martha Mott Kelley and Mary Louise Aswell ==
=== As 'Q. Patrick' ===
==== Novels by Webb and Kelley ====
- Cottage Sinister – 1931. Abridged version: Triple Detective, Winter 1948
- Murder at the Women's City Club – 1932 (also Death in the Dovecote)

==== Novels by Webb ====
- Murder at the 'Varsity – 1933 (also Murder at Cambridge)
- The Grindle Nightmare – 1935 (also Darker Grows the Valley). Abridged version: Detective Novel Magazine, May 1947
- Death Goes to School – 1936

==== Novel by Webb and Aswell ====
- S.S. Murder – 1933

==== Novels by Webb and Wheeler ====
- Death for Dear Clara – 1937, with Inspector Trant
- The File on Fenton and Farr – 1938
- The File on Claudia Cragge – 1938, with Inspector Trant
- Death and the Maiden – 1939, with Inspector Trant
- Return to the Scene – 1941 (also Death in Bermuda), serialised in the U.K.: Woman, 26 July 1941, 2 August 1941, 9 August 1941, 16 August 1941, 23 August 1941, 30 August 1941, 6 September 1941 and 13 September 1941
- Danger Next Door – 1952
- The Girl on the Gallows – 1954

==== Short fiction by Webb and Wheeler ====
- Darker Grows the Valley. Mystery, May 1935
- Killed by Time. Street & Smith's Detective Story Magazine, October 1935. Collected in Hunt in the Dark and Other Fatal Pursuits (2021)
- The Dogs Do Bark. Street & Smith's Detective Story Magazine, November 1935
- The Frightened Landlady. Street & Smith's Detective Story Magazine, December 1935. Collected in Hunt in the Dark and Other Fatal Pursuits (2021)
- Call the Heart Home. Sketch, 18 December 1935
- The Scarlet Circle. Street & Smith's Detective Story Magazine, January 1936
- The Hated Woman. Street & Smith's Detective Story Magazine, February 1936. Collected in Hunt in the Dark and Other Fatal Pursuits (2021)
- Murder or Mercy. Street & Smith's Detective Story Magazine, June 1936
- The Jack of Diamonds. The American Magazine, November 1936. Collected in Exit before Midnight: A Collection of Murder Tales (2023)
- Death Goes to School. PUBLICATION UNKNOWN, 1936
- Danger Next Door. Street & Smith's Detective Story Magazine, May 1937
- The Lady Had Nine Lives. The American Magazine, August 1937
- Exit Before Midnight. The American Magazine, October 1937. Serialised weekly in the U.K.: Woman Magazine, 4 to 25 January 1941. Reprinted: Bodies from the Library 2 (2019). Collected in Exit before Midnight: A Collection of Murder Tales (2023)
- Death and the Maiden. American Weekly, 22 and 29 January 1939
- Death for Dear Clara. Five-in-One Detective Magazine, June/July 1939
- Another Man’s Poison. The American Magazine, January 1940. Collected in Exit before Midnight: A Collection of Murder Tales (2023)
- Death Rides the Ski-Tow. The American Magazine, April 1941. Serialised weekly in the U.K. as Death Rides the Ski Trail, Woman Magazine, 6 to 20 March 1943. Collected in The Puzzles of Peter Duluth (2016)
- Ordeal. Woman Magazine, 18 October 1941
- Murder with Flowers. The American Magazine, December 1941. Collected in The Puzzles of Peter Duluth (2016)
- Portrait of a Murderer. Harper's Magazine, April 1942
- Humphrey. This Week, 24 May 1942. Reprinted as Cat’s Cradle. Woman Magazine, 26 September 1942
- Lest We Forget. Woman Magazine, 27 June 1942
- The Woman Who Waited. The Shadow, January 1945. Collected in Hunt in the Dark and Other Fatal Pursuits (2021)

==== Short fiction by Wheeler ====
- White Carnations. Collier's, 10 February 1945. Collected in The Cases of Lieutenant Timothy Trant
- The Plaster Cat. Mystery Book Magazine, July 1946. Collected in The Cases of Lieutenant Timothy Trant
- Murder at Cambridge. Thrilling Mystery Novel Magazine, January 1947
- The Corpse in the Closet. This Week, 16 February 1947. Reprinted: Ellery Queen's Mystery Magazine, January 1948. Collected in The Cases of Lieutenant Timothy Trant
- This Way Out. Mystery Book Magazine, March 1947
- Death on Saturday Night. Ellery Queens's Mystery Magazine. Collected in The Cases of Lieutenant Timothy Trant
- Love Comes to Miss Lucy. Ellery Queen's Mystery Magazine, April 1947
- Footlights and Murder. This Week, 11 May 1947
- Little Boy Lost Ellery Queen's Mystery Magazine, October 1947
- Murder in One Scene. This Week, 2 May 1948
- Mother, May I Go Out to Swim?. Ellery Queen's Mystery Magazine, July 1948
- Farewell Performance. Ellery Queen's Mystery Magazine, September 1948
- The Wrong Envelope. Mystery Book Magazine, 1948
- Murder in the Alps. This Week, 20 February 1949
- Death and the Maiden Detective Novel Magazine, Spring 1949. Reprinted: This Week, 26 May 1949
- Who Killed the Mermaid?. This Week, 26 May 1949. Collected in The Cases of Lieutenant Timothy Trant
- Thou Lord See'st Me. Ellery Queen's Mystery Magazine, July 1949
- The Case of the Plaster Cat. This Week, 3 September 1949
- Town Blonde, Country Blonde. This Week, 16 October 1949
- Woman of Ice. This Week, 30 October 1949. Collected in The Cases of Lieutenant Timothy Trant
- This Looks Like Murder. This Week, 30 April 1950. Collected in The Cases of Lieutenant Timothy Trant
- A Boy’s Will. Ellery Queen's Mystery Magazine, June 1950
- Death on the Riviera. This Week, 30 July 1950
- Death and Canasta. This Week, 15 October 1950
- Night. This Week, 26 November 1950 (Death on Saturday Night)
- This Will Kill You. Ellery Queen's Mystery Magazine, November 1950
- Girl Overboard (book). Four-&-Twenty Bloodhounds (1950). Collected in The Cases of Lieutenant Timothy Trant
- All the Way to the Moon. Ellery Queen's Mystery Magazine, September 1951
- Death before Breakfast. This Week, 11 March 1951. Collected in The Cases of Lieutenant Timothy Trant
- Glamorous Opening. This Week, 3 June 1951
- Death at the Fair. (London) Evening Standard, 9 November 1951. Collected in The Cases of Lieutenant Timothy Trant
- The Pigeon Woman. Ellery Queen's Mystery Magazine, July 1952
- Revolvers and Roses. This Week, 7 December 1952
- The 'Laughing Man' Murders. The American Magazine, March 1953
- Death on a First Night. Mackill's Mystery Magazine, May 1953.
- On the Day of the Rose Show. Ellery Queen's Mystery Magazine. Collected in The Cases of Lieutenant Timothy Trant
- Going...Going...Gone!. This Week, 10 May 1953. Collected in The Cases of Lieutenant Timothy Trant
- The Predestined. Britannia & Eve, 1 August 1953. Reprinted in Bodies from the Library 5 (2022).
- The Red Balloon. Weird Tales, November 1953. Reprinted in Ghosts from the Library (2023).
- Two Deadly Females. This Week, 3 April 1955
- Lioness versus Panther. Ellery Queen's Mystery Magazine. Collected in The Cases of Lieutenant Timothy Trant
- The Fat Cat. Suspense, March 1959. Reprinted as The Fat Cat Which Sat on the Mat (Great Animal Stories No. 3). Aberdeen Evening Express, 18 and 19 October 1961

=== As 'Dick Callingham' ===
==== Short fiction by Webb and Wheeler ====
- Striking Silence. Street & Smith's Detective Story Magazine, February 1936
- Terror Keepers. Street & Smith's Detective Story Magazine, March 1936
- Frightened Killer. Street & Smith's Detective Story Magazine, May 1937

=== As 'Patrick Quentin' ===
==== Novels by Webb and Wheeler ====
- A Puzzle for Fools – 1936
  with Peter Duluth.
- Puzzle for Players – 1938
  with Peter Duluth.
- Puzzle for Puppets – 1944
  with Peter Duluth. Serialised weekly as “Ring around the Roses” as by Q Patrick. Woman magazine, 18 April to 9 May 1942. Filmed as Homicide for Three (1948) .
- Puzzle for Wantons – 1945 (also Slay the Loose Ladies)
  with Peter Duluth. Originally serialised as "Puzzle for Frauds". Woman Magazine (UK), 20 January to 10 March 1945
- Puzzle for Fiends – 1946 (also Love Is a Deadly Weapon)
  with Peter Duluth. Filmed in the UK as The Strange Awakening (1958), US title Female Fiends . Serialised weekly in the U.K., Answers Magazine, 24 August 1946 to 8 February 1947
- Puzzle for Pilgrims – 1947 (also The Fate of the Immodest Blonde)
  with Peter Duluth.
- Run to Death – 1948
  with Peter Duluth.
- The Follower – 1950
- Black Widow – 1952 (also Fatal Woman)
  with Peter Duluth and Inspector Trant. Filmed as Black Widow (1954) .

==== Novels by Wheeler ====
- My Son, the Murderer – 1954 (also The Wife of Ronald Sheldon)
  with Peter Duluth (briefly) and Inspector Trant.
- The Man with Two Wives – 1955. Serialised, Woman's Own Weekly from 16 June 1955, 23 June 1955, 30 June 1955, 7 July 1955, 14 July 1855, 21 July 1955, 28 July 1955 and 4 August 1955
  with Inspector Trant. Filmed as Tsuma Futari (1967) by Shindo Kaneto .
- The Man in the Net – 1956
  Filmed as The Man in the Net (1959) .
- Suspicious Circumstances – 1957
- Shadow of Guilt – 1959
  with Inspector Trant. Filmed as L'Homme à femmes (1960) .
- The Green-Eyed Monster – 1960
- The Ordeal of Mrs. Snow – 1961
  A short story collection; the title story was filmed for TV as an episode of The Alfred Hitchcock Hour, "The Ordeal of Mrs. Snow" (1964) .
- Family Skeletons – 1965
  with Inspector Trant. Filmed for West German TV as Familienschande (1988) .

==== Short story collections by Webb and Wheeler ====
- The Puzzles of Peter Duluth – Crippen & Landru Publishers, 2016. Short stories.
- The Cases of Lieutenant Trant – Crippen & Landru Publishers, 2020. Short stories.
- Hunt in the Dark and Other Fatal Pursuits – Crippen & Landru Publishers, 2021. Short stories.

==== Short fiction by Webb and Wheeler ====
- Honor the Valiant.This Week, 20 October 1940
- She Wrote Finis. Maclean's Magazine, December 1940 – January 1941 (Trant)
- Witness for the Prosecution, Ellery Queen's Mystery Magazine, July 1946*
- Passport to Murder, The American Magazine March 1950

==== Short non-fiction by Wheeler ====
- Unlucky Lady. American Weekly, 10 May 1953

=== As 'Jonathan Stagge' ===
==== Novels by Webb and Wheeler ====
- Murder Gone to Earth – 1936 (also The Dogs Do Bark) – with Dr Hugh Westlake
- Murder or Mercy? – 1937 (also Murder by Prescription) – with Dr Hugh Westlake
- The Stars Spell Death – 1939 (also Murder in the Stars) – with Dr Hugh Westlake
- Turn of the Table – 1940 (also Funeral for Five). Serialised in US newspapers as The Table Talks – with Dr Hugh Westlake
- The Yellow Taxi – 1942 (also Call a Hearse). Serialised in US newspapers as Riddle in Red – with Dr Hugh Westlake
- The Scarlet Circle – 1943 (also Light from a Lantern) – with Dr Hugh Westlake
- Death, My Darling Daughters – 1945 (also Death and the Dear Girls)
- Death's Old Sweet Song – 1946
- The Three Fears – 1949 – with Dr Hugh Westlake

== Novels by Hugh Wheeler ==
- The Crippled Muse – 1951

== Novels by Mary Louise Aswell ==
- Far to Go – 1957
