= Barbara Neely =

African-American novelist (1941–2020)

- Born: Barbara Ann Neely; November 30, 1941; Pittsburgh, Pennsylvania, U.S.
- Died: March 2, 2020 (aged 78); Philadelphia, Pennsylvania, U.S.
- Education: University of Pittsburgh University of Massachusetts
- Occupation: Novelist
- Spouse: Jeremiah Cotton
- Children: 2
- Writing career
- Genre: Mystery
- Notable awards: Agatha Award, Anthony Award, Macavity Award

Barbara Ann Neely (often self-stylized as BarbaraNeely; November 30, 1941 – March 2, 2020) was an African-American novelist, short story writer and activist who wrote murder mysteries. Her first novel, Blanche on the Lam (1992), introduced the protagonist Blanche White, a middle-aged mother, domestic worker and amateur detective. The Mystery Writers of America named her their 2020 Grand Master winner.

== Biography ==
=== Early life and education ===
Barbara Neely was born in Pittsburgh, Pennsylvania, in 1941, was the oldest of three children born to Ann and Bernard Neely who lived in a rural Pennsylvania Dutch community in Lebanon, Pennsylvania.

She attended a Roman Catholic elementary school and was the only child in her class of Pennsylvania German dialect (popularly known as Pennsylvania Dutch) students to speak English fluently and was the only student of African-American descent to attend her elementary and high school. In 1971, she moved to Pittsburgh, Pennsylvania, where she was awarded a master's degree in Urban and Regional Planning from the University of Pittsburgh.

=== Activism ===
After earning her degree, she became thoroughly involved in local activism and created a community-based housing program for female felons in an area of Pittsburgh called Shady Side. The program was developed through her position with Pennsylvania's Department of Corrections and was the state's first community based correctional center for women.

During a trip to San Francisco in 1978, Neely witnessed a woman dancing in front of a band which she says inspired her to take her work in activism even farther. Neely stated, "she [the dancing woman] started pointing to people, and when she turned and pointed to me, it seemed to me that she was saying, 'Do it today, because today is all you have.'" Soon after, Neely had her first piece of fiction, a short story called "Passing the Word", published in Essence magazine. Neely moved to North Carolina and began writing for Southern Exposure as well as producing various shows for the African News Service. Her involvement in activism continued with becoming director of a YWCA branch, Family Services Coordinator for ABCD Head Start, executive director of Women for Economic Justice, cofounder (with Loretta Ross, and others) of Women of Color for Reproductive Freedom, and host of Commonwealth Journal on Boston Radio. She was also part of an evaluative research team at the Institute for Social Research.

=== Publishing career ===
Neely published her first short story, "Passing the Word" (1981), in the magazine Essence. Her Blanche White novels appeared a decade later, beginning with Blanche on the Lam (1992), followed by Blanche Among the Talented Tenth (1994), Blanche Cleans Up (1998), and Blanche Passes Go (2000). Most notable about Neely's heroine Blanche is both her physical appearance as well as her occupation; she is a heavy-set, dark-skinned Black woman who works as a maid. Blanche is proud of her work and does not let it get in the way of her independence and proud personality. This immediately sets her apart from the typical protagonist. Other notable characteristics of Blanche are her curiosity, and her ability to piece together clues in order to figure out mysteries.

=== Death ===
Neely died on March 2, 2020, at the age of 78 after a short illness.

== Literary style ==
Neely enjoyed a wide range of authors, such as P. D. James, Chester Himes, and Walter Mosley, but the one author that inspired her the most was Toni Morrison. Neely used her as a model of what she wanted to become. She saw what Morrison did with the experiences of black woman to tell stories of ordinary people and tried to emulate the same style. At first it was a short story but her editor told her it should be a longer piece of work. The stories of Blanche White contain themes and issues that go beyond mystery and into political and social commentary. Blanche allows Neely to explore the female beauty. There are other issues that Neely is able to tackle through her writing – such as violence against women, racism, class boundaries, and sexism. Barbara Neely is quoted as saying, "That as a feminist mystery writer it is not enough to create strong women, and that maybe the term 'feminist mystery writer' is being used too loosely."

With her character of Blanche, Neely wanted to be able to write something about race and class that was funny. Blanche and her charming personality, along with Neely's messages, are at the center of her mystery novels' plot lines. According to Rosemary Hathaway, Neely creates Blanche's character to not only take on the issues raised, but to also be the issues. Neely gives Blanche a double-consciousness and when thrown into tough situations, "Blanche's detective work enacts more of a triple - or even a quadruple-consciousness".

Neely's work reinforces her beliefs about race and class in America. As Ann Collette explains, "the keep-it real ethic of Neely's writing is a natural outgrowth of the author's down-to-earth nature and her fierce commitment to political activism, her profession before she turned to writing full-time".

== Awards ==
For Blanche on the Lam, Neely received an Agatha Award for best first novel (1992); an Anthony Award for first best novel (1993); the Go on Girl! Award from the Black Women's Reading Club for the best début novel; and a Macavity Award for first best mystery novel (1993). Neely also won two awards for her activism. They include "Community Works Social Action Award for Leadership and Activism for Women's Rights and Economic Justice" and "Fighting for Women's Voices Award" from the Coalition for Basic Human Needs.

In December 2019, the Mystery Writers of America named her their 2020 Grand Master winner. Ms. Neely's death came less than two months before the April 30, 2020 banquet where she would have received her award. One year later, the Mystery Writers of America created a scholarship program in her name for Black crime fiction writers—one for an already published author, and another for someone getting started in publishing.

== Published works ==
=== Short stories ===
- "Passing the Word," in Essence (1981)
- "Rosie and Me," in The Things that Divide Us (1985)
- "Spilled Salt," in Terry McMillan (ed.), Breaking Ice: An Anthology of Contemporary African American Fiction (1990)
- "The Dog Who Remembered Too Much," in Tar Heel Dead: Tales of Mystery and Mayhem from North Carolina (2005)

=== Blanche White novels ===
- Blanche on the Lam (1992)
- Blanche Among the Talented Tenth (1994)
- Blanche Cleans Up (1998)
- Blanche Passes Go (2000)

=== Critical studies and reviews of Neely's work ===
- Koyuki-Smith, Lisa (Fall 2024). "Night Girl and the Nate-Rock: Material Feminisms and Double Consciousness in Barbara Neely's Blanche on the Lam". Clues. 42 (2): 21–32.
