= Brian D'Amato =

American novelist, artist and academic (born 1962)

- Born: August 1962 (age 63–64); Grand Rapids, Michigan, U.S.
- Occupations: Novelist; artist; academic
- Parents: Anthony D'Amato (father); Barbara D'Amato (mother)
- Writing career
- Years active: 1990s–present
- Genres: Biopunk; transhumanism; posthumanism
- Notable works: Beauty; In the Courts of the Sun; The Sacrifice Game

Brian D'Amato (born August 1962) is an American novelist, artist, and academic known for his work in biopunk, transhumanism, and posthumanism fiction, as well as his contributions to contemporary art.

== Early life ==
Brian D'Amato is the son of Northwestern Law professor Anthony D'Amato and mystery novelist Barbara D'Amato. As a young child, while his father taught at Wellesley College, he was babysat by Hillary Rodham (later Clinton), then a student at the college. He attended New Trier High School in the Chicago suburbs. He graduated from the Graduate Center of the City University of New York.

== Career ==
In the 1990s, D'Amato exhibited sculptures and installations at venues including the Whitney Museum, the Wexner Center for the Arts, and the New Museum of Contemporary Art. He has written for publications such as Harper's Bazaar, Vogue, Index Magazine, Flash Art, and Artforum. D'Amato has taught art and art history at the City University of New York, Ohio State University, and Yale University.

As a novelist, D'Amato debuted with Beauty (1992), a horror-thriller about cosmetic surgery, which was translated into several languages. It was republished by Little, Brown's Mulholland Classics in 2013. He is also the author of The Sacrifice Game trilogy, comprising In the Courts of the Sun (2009) and The Sacrifice Game (2012), both published by Dutton. A trade paperback edition of In the Courts of the Sun was published by New American Library in 2009.

== Bibliography ==
- Beauty (1992)
- The Sacrifice Game Trilogy
  - In the Courts of the Sun (2009)
  - The Sacrifice Game (2012)
