= Anthony D'Amato (law professor) =

American lawyer and academic (1937–2018)

- Born: 1937
- Died: March 24, 2018 (aged 80–81)
- Education: Cornell University; Harvard University; Columbia University (PhD)
- Years active: 1963–2015
- Spouse: Barbara D'Amato
- Children: 2, including Brian

Anthony D'Amato (1937 – March 24, 2018) was an American lawyer and academic who was professor at Northwestern University Law School. He is known for his litigation on human rights and academic work on customary international law.

== Early life and education ==
D'Amato was born in 1937.

He received his bachelor's degree from Cornell University, a law degree from Harvard Law School (where he was editor of the Harvard Law Review) and a Ph.D. from Columbia University.

== Career ==
D’Amato was a professor of political science at Wellesley College from 1963 to 1966. He joined Northwestern in 1968.

He was the first American lawyer to win a case before the European Court of Human Rights.

He was the Judd and Mary Morris Leighton Professor of Law at Northwestern until his retirement in 2015.

== Personal life and death ==
He was married to author Barbara D'Amato. They had two sons, including Brian D'Amato.

He died on March 24, 2018.
