= Barbara D'Amato =

American writer (born 1938)

- Born: Barbara Steketee; April 10, 1938 (age 88) Grand Rapids, Michigan, U.S.
- Education: Cornell University; Northwestern University
- Genre: Mystery fiction
- Notable awards: Anthony Award (1993); Agatha Award (1998)
- Spouse: Anthony D'Amato (m. 1958)
- Children: 2, including Brian

Website
- barbaradamato.com

Barbara D'Amato (née Steketee; born April 10, 1938) is an American mystery author and winner of the Agatha and Anthony Award. She also features in Great Women Mystery Writers (2007).

== Early life ==
She was born Barbara Steketee in Grand Rapids, Michigan, the daughter of the owner of the department store Steketee's. She studied at Cornell University but left to marry Anthony D'Amato in 1958. Anthony became a law school professor and Barbara later completed her bachelor's degree from Northwestern University in 1971, followed by a master's.

== Career ==
She began writing full-time in 1973, first co-writing plays with her husband. After trying different genres her first published novel in 1980 was a mystery. She won the Agatha and Anthony Award for a non-fiction work, The Doctor, the Murder, the Mystery: The True Story of the Dr. John Branion Murder Case based on a case her husband worked on in 1984. The book led to the reopening of the case and eventual pardon and release of Branion. In 1999, she served as President of the Mystery Writers of America.

== Personal life ==
With Anthony they have two sons Brian and Paul, and live in Chicago.

== Published works ==
=== Gerritt De Graaf series ===
1. The Hands of Healing Murder (1980)
2. The Eyes on Utopia Murders (1981)

=== Cat Marsala series ===
1. Hardball (1989)
2. Hard Tack (1991)
3. Hard Luck (1992)
4. Hard Women (1993)
5. Hard Case (1994)
6. Hard Christmas (1995)
7. Hard Bargain (1997)
8. Hard Evidence (1999)
9. Hard Road (2001)

=== Figueroa and Bennis series ===
1. Killer.app (1996)
2. Good Cop, Bad Cop (1998)
3. Help Me Please (1999)
4. Authorized Personnel Only (2000)
5. Death of a Thousand Cuts (2004)

=== Other novels ===
- On My Honor (1989) (writing as Malacai Black)
- White Male Infant (2002)
- Foolproof (2009) (with Jeanne M Dams and Mark Richard Zubro)
- Other Eyes (2011)

=== Anthologies and collections ===
Title	Contents	Publication Date	Publisher
Of Course You Know That Chocolate Is a Vegetable: And Other Stories	See No Evil Freedom of the Press	May 2000	Five Star First Edition Mystery Speaking Volumes
Crimes By Moonlight	The Conqueror Worm	Jan 2010	Berkley

=== Non-fiction ===
- The Doctor, the Murder, the Mystery: The True Story of the Dr. John Branion Murder Case (1997)
