= Jeremiah Healy =

American crime novelist (1948–2014)

- Born: Jeremiah Francis Healy III; May 15, 1948; Teaneck, New Jersey, U.S.
- Died: August 14, 2014 (aged 66); Pompano Beach, Florida, U.S.
- Education: Rutgers University, Harvard Law School
- Occupations: Novelist, lawyer, professor
- Spouse: Bonnie M. Tisler (div.)
- Partner: Sandra Balzo (fiancée)
- Writing career
- Period: 1980s–2000s
- Genres: Crime fiction, detective fiction, legal thriller
- Notable works: Blunt Darts, The Staked Goat, Right to Die
- Notable awards: Shamus Award (1986)

Jeremiah Francis Healy III (May 15, 1948 – August 14, 2014) was an American crime novelist, lawyer and academic who created the Boston private investigator John Francis Cuddy.

== Early life ==
Healy was born in Teaneck, New Jersey, the son of Jeremiah and Evelyn Healy. He graduated from Rutgers University in 1970 and from Harvard Law School in 1973. Before turning to fiction, he worked as a trial lawyer and taught at the New England School of Law in Boston from 1978 to 1996.

== Writing career ==
Healy began writing while teaching law, introducing his private investigator John Francis Cuddy in Blunt Darts (1984). The Cuddy series explored moral and social questions through a Vietnam veteran turned detective working in Boston. The Staked Goat (1986) won the Shamus Award for Best Novel, and several later entries were nominated for the same honour. His fiction addressed contemporary issues including assisted suicide, racism and homelessness, as seen in Right to Die (1991) and Foursome (1993). Under the pseudonym Terry Devane, he wrote three legal thrillers (2001–2003) featuring defence attorney Mairead O’Clare. He also served as president of both the Private Eye Writers of America and the International Association of Crime Writers.

== Later life and death ==
Healy survived prostate cancer in 2003 and documented his recovery online. He struggled with chronic depression and died by suicide on 14 August 2014 in Pompano Beach, Florida, aged 66. He was survived by his fiancée, mystery writer Sandra Balzo.

== Bibliography ==
=== John Francis Cuddy series ===
- Blunt Darts (1984)
- The Staked Goat (1986) (published also as The Tethered Goat)
- So Like Sleep (1987)
- Swan Dive (1988)
- Yesterday’s News (1989)
- Right to Die (1991)
- Shallow Graves (1992)
- Foursome (1993)
- Act of God (1994)
- Rescue (1995)
- Invasion of Privacy (1996)
- The Only Good Lawyer (1998)
- Spiral (1999)
- Collections: The Concise Cuddy (1998)
- Cuddy – Plus One (2003)

=== Stand-alone novels ===
- The Stalking of Sheilah Quinn (1998)
- Turnabout (2001)

=== Mairead O’Clare series (as Terry Devane) ===
- Uncommon Justice (2001)
- Juror Number Eleven (2002)
- A Stain Upon the Robe (2003)

=== Short stories/novellas (selection) ===
- One Eye Open (1989)
- Battered Spouse (1990)
- Rest Stop (1992)
- The Bagged Man (1993)
- Turning the Witness (1996)
- Hodegetria (1999)
- What’s in a Name? (2000)
- Aftermath (2002)
- Off Season, and Other Stories (2003) (collection)
- Two Birds with One Stone (2005)
- In the Line of Duty (2011)
