= The Doctor, the Murder, the Mystery =

1992 book written by Barbara D'Amato

The Doctor, the Murder, the Mystery: The True Story of the Dr. John Branion Murder Case
- Author: Barbara D'Amato
- Genre: True crime
- Published: 1992
- Publisher: Noble Press Inc
- Pages: 319
- Awards: Anthony Award for Best True Crime (1993)
- ISBN: 978-1-879-36013-6

The Doctor, the Murder, the Mystery: The True Story of the Dr. John Branion Murder Case is a book written by Barbara D'Amato and published by Noble Press Inc on 1 March 1992 which later went on to win the Anthony Award for Best True Crime in 1993.
