= Blanche on the Lam =

1992 mystery novel by author Barbara Neely

- Dust-jacket illustration of the first U.S. edition
- Author: Barbara Neely
- Language: English
- Genre: Detective fiction
- Publisher: St. Martin's Press
- Publication date: 1992
- Publication place: United States
- Media type: Print (hardback & paperback)
- Pages: 180 pp (first edition, hardcover)
- ISBN: 0-312-06908-1
- Followed by: Blanche among the Talented Tenth

Blanche on the Lam is a 1992 mystery novel by author Barbara Neely, the first in a series by her. This novel brings to light the intelligence and power of an African-American domestic female worker in the midst of a racist and sexist society. The book won the Agatha Award and the Anthony Award for Best First Novel, and the Macavity Award for Best First Mystery. The series continues with Blanche among the Talented Tenth (1994), Blanche Cleans Up (1998), and Blanche Passes Go (2000).

== Background ==
Throughout European and American history, upper class and upper-middle-class families had a prevailing attitude of ignoring their servants until they were needed for labor. Servants were expected to be silent and they had little opportunity to report criminal behavior within their own living/work environment. The American system of slavery, even in the post-emancipation era, took expectations of invisibility and powerlessness of servants to the extreme. Enslaved Africans found themselves in a position in which they were left to deal, without support of the law or society, the immoral slavery in the United States. Thus, due to lack of food and no pay, servants would often resort to petty theft. After enslaved blacks were emancipated, they made efforts to move beyond domestic work and manual labor, but many came to the realization that the only work available to them was domestic work or manual labor (both positions paid very little). Barbara Neely draws upon these societal oppressions to be the foundation of Blanche on the Lam.

== Plot summary ==
Blanche on the Lam opens in a court room with Blanche being accused of writing bad checks and being sentenced to thirty days in jail to teach her a lesson. She has a small panic attack at the thought of having to spend thirty days in a small jail cell and asks to use the rest room where she ends up fuming over what has become of her life in Farleigh, North Carolina since moving there from New York City. She gave up better pay for the safety of her children and ended being unable to cover the checks she wrote, being accused of writing more bad checks than she had, and being sentenced to time in jail because of it.

There is a disturbance out in the hall and she takes her chance to escape by slipping out of the restroom and making her way to the exit and out into the underground parking lot. She walks quickly out of the area and finds herself in the neighborhood to a job she had got from the Ty-Dee Girls agency she cancelled for that week. Luckily for her the agency has yet to send her replacement and the woman who comes out of the house does not question her about her apparent lateness. She is then brought into the house, instructed to serve lunch, and then be ready to depart the house so they can head to the country.

After lunch Blanche and the family of four drive out to the country house by the sea. That day she learns that one of the family members, Aunt Emmeline, is a drunk or at least that is what she assumes, and is a witness to her Will signing that hands over the control of her nephew, Mumsfield‘s, money to his cousins, Grace and Everett. After the signing she learns from Nate, who has worked for the family for many years, that something was not right with the Will signing situation. He does not explain his reasoning but she intends to find out, all the while planning her move to New York, later Boston, to escape the Sheriff and the jail sentence she is running from.

Later, after returning from running errands with Mumsfield, she finds the Sheriff at the country house and thinks she has been caught, but it turns out that Sheriff is there to see Everett. After she has calmed herself she wonders why the Sheriff was there if not for her, and is even more curious when she realizes how much time he is spending at the property. Nate refuses to tell her but Blanche is determined to find out. Aside from that mystery she is sure that Grace and Everett are trying to get hold or at least control of Mumsfield’s money because they have gone through all of Grace’s money.

Listening to the news one morning on the radio she hears of the Sheriff’s suicide. She is happy that she does not have to worry about him anymore and that she does not have to leave for Boston, but it strikes her after she remembers the conversation she eavesdropped on just the evening before that the Sheriff would not have committed suicide. The man had just been saying that he did not want to leave the place he lived and worked in and had no plans give up his job as the Sheriff of the county. Not only did she hear that declaration, she also heard Everett threaten the man right after it, and that night she was woken up by a sound out of place for a country night and witnessed Everett rolling the limousine silently down the driveway.

However, Blanche cannot assume that she is living with a murderer based on what she overheard and witnessed. The same day Nate comes and tells her that he saw someone wearing a pink jacket walking the short-cut route to the place where the Sheriff died. It is obvious he thinks it was Everett. Later that day Everett confronts Blanche about the whereabouts of Nate, and the next day he ends being dead. Killed in a house fire during the night.

Blanche finds clues here and there and eventually learns that the Aunt Emmeline she saw sign the will was an impostor and that the real woman had been killed. After going over the clues she had and looking at what evidence she had already uncovered and seeing Grace again, she realized that she had been suspecting the wrong person of murder all along. Who would have thought sweet, believable, weary, frightened Grace would have been a serial killer?

== Characters ==
=== Major characters ===
==== Blanche White ====
She is the central character on Blanche on the Lam. She is a black woman, who is a housekeeper and cook, on the run from a jail term for a minor offense. She hides out as a domestic worker for a dysfunctional white family. According to Mildred Mickle, Blanche is "a domestic heroine, a very human, compassionate, and honest yet tricky figure.". Blanche recognizes as an adult that as a black women domestic, she is "invisible", however recalling her aunt's wisdom when she was a child, she recognizes the potential power of that invisibility. This power allows her to hide from the law and conduct and cover up her investigations on the Carter family.

==== Mumsfield ====
He is white and a cousin of Grace. He has Mosaic Down Syndrome. He holds a good amount of power in the novel because he is the designated heir to the family fortune and for that his family plots to cheat him out of the money. Although he is white, he cannot be understood or accepted by his family, "He exists in a liminal space, somewhere in between black and white." He relates more to Blanche than his own white family because they share a common reality of being misunderstood and denigrated; she in turn relates to him because others treat them both as if they are "invisible." Additionally, they both see beyond the superficial and discover hidden truths.

==== Grace ====
She plays the stereotypical white mistress role. She pays little attention to the people she trusts to run her home but hypocritically, it is because she does not see them as individuals. Blanche, however, takes advantage of Grace's ignorance by pretending to be a former employee so that she can get hired even though she has a warrant out for her arrest. Grace also uses her stereotype as a white gentle woman to deceive and manipulate everyone in the novel.

==== Nate ====
He serves as a gardener for the Carter family, whom Blanche is working for while in hiding. He acts submissive and quiet in front of Grace, but he drops this stereotypical "Uncle Tom" act and reveals himself to be a sharp witted, humorous man. He owes his life to Grace, because he was about to be lynched (before the novel takes place) and twelve-year-old Grace intervened and saved him. However, he reveals to Grace that this burden of servitude to the Carter family has angered him more than made him grateful. Additionally, Grace, merely sees him as an object to be worked. When Nate is mysteriously murdered, Blanche begins her detective work and works to avenge his death and bring his killer to justice.

==== Everett ====
He is Grace's husband. He presents himself in the eyes of Blanche as the central villain and is conspicuous from the start of the novel. His former wife mysteriously died, leading him to an inheritance. Blanche suspects the Sheriff to be blackmailing (or as she calls it "white male") Everett so that he does not tell Grace he cheated on her.

=== Minor characters ===
==== Archibald Symington ====
He is Mumsfield's cousin and the family lawyer. Blanche catches Symington calling in favors to keep Nate's murder committed by one of his family members out of court to avoid a scandal. He tries to bribe Blanche from revealing this scandal by telling her he will get her sentence repealed.

==== Aunt Emmeline ====
She holds the inheritance that she plans to pass to Mumsfield. Blanche notes about Aunt Emmeline that she "looked like a drunken Little Orphan Annie at eighty, with her frizzy yellow hair and blank, watery eyes." Blanche is asked to witness Aunt Emmeline sign over her will to Grace and Everett, striking suspicion in Blanche. It is revealed later in the novel that this woman is an imposter and the real Aunt Emmeline was murdered by Grace.

== Genre ==
This novel is a mystery/crime genre. According to Mildred Mickle, "Whether we like it or not, there is a complex relationship among the unglamorous domestic milieu, race, and the mystery/crime genre." In The Blues Detective: A Study of African American Detective Fiction (1996), Stephen F. Soitos noted that in African-American and American crime and mystery fiction, black domestics frequently play the role of detectives and other crime fighters. Soitos claims that for African-American writers, mystery and crime fiction serve many purposes. Using black detectives in their novels, the authors express levels of black reality: "the conflict of being caught between black and American self-identity; the ability to see more readily beneath the surface and find hidden truths; he restructuring of the detective into different, more three-dimensional roles; and the incorporation of black speech patterns into dialogue." Following the tradition of many black artist in the 20th century, Barbara Neely uses the mystery/crime genre to incorporate themes of deception and perception. With the use of Blanche's character as the detective, Neely asks who is the real criminal: master or slave, upper class or the working class, black or white?

== Themes ==
=== Invisibility ===
The issues of trust, deception, and perception have long flourished in racial and gender conflicts. Barbara Neely, exposes these issues through the web of mystery surrounding the murders and cheating that surrounds the characters in Blanche on the Lam. Additionally, there is an overall theme of fear of the characters in the novel that is rooted in the distrust between employer and servant. Blanche grows to trust Mumsfield but ridicules this trust for a white employer by calling it "Darkies Disease" — "where blacks internalize the role of the servant and take on the personal problems of their employers to the detriment of themselves.".

Blanche utilizes all three aspects that provide her with invisibility (being black, female, and a domestic servant) and relies on her identity as a "Night Girl"- a name a wise aunt gave her when she found Blanche crying because some kids teased her about having a dark, black complexion. Her aunt consoled her by saying:

"They jealous 'cause you got the night in you. Some people got night in 'im, some got morning, others, like me and your mama, god dusk. But it's only them that's got night can become invisible. People what got night in 'em can step into the dark and poof...Go any old where they want. Do anything. Ride them stars up there, like as not. Shoot, girl, no wonder them kids teasing you. I'm a grown woman and I'm jealous, too!"

Blanche's aunt gives her a positive conception of dark skin and instead of being ashamed, Blanche utilizes this concept of being invisible in to a powerful liberation. It allows her to move unseen, to discover the Carter family secrets, and ultimately turns her in to a crafty detective who solves all the crime in the novel. Her disguise is a socially constructed one based on her race, gender, and social class, however by turning these into positive tools, she proves to her oppressors that she is not confined or constructed by how others see (or do not see) her.

The confined gender roles for females allow the strength of characters such as Grace and Blanche to remain hidden. Their manipulation, sneaking, and hiding from the law are only successful because they are women. Both are believed by the other characters in the novel to be too submissive, shallow, and dim-witted to get away with their goals. Blanche soon discovers that she can unravel more of Grace and Everett's treacherous plot to inherit Mumsfield's money because she is in the house, whereas Nate, as a man, is working outside. The biggest twist, that Grace is the mass murderer and plotter of cheating her family out of their fortune, exposes the sexist notions that the readers themselves have rooted into their culture. Throughout the plot, Everett seems to be the most likely suspect to the murders and manipulation of the will, all the while making it easier for Grace to get away with mass murdering anyone in her path. Even though, the heroine and the villain of this novel evoke different emotions from the readers, there is a larger feminist theme in play that is made possible by taking advantage of the cloak of invisibility that society has placed over women.

=== Stereotypes of the black body ===
In I Know What the Red Clay Looks Like: The Voice and Vision of Black Women Writers, Rebecca Carroll interviews Barbara Neely, and she discusses how she formed Blanche White:

"The character of Blanche initially came from a woman I knew in North Carolina who had a look that inspired me to create a heroine in her memory...I knew I wanted her to be representative of who black women are, presently and historically. Both my grandmothers did domestic work..." "A cleansing construction: Blanche White as domestic heroine in Barbara Neely's Blanche on the Lam.".

During the antebellum and postbellum periods in American slavery, the black body was made into a part of a mass marketing scheme. Stereotypes centered around the negative connotations of blacks having dark skin, nappy hair, and other physical attributes. The specific female and male stereotypes were generally known as: the Sambo, the Mammy, and the Uncle Tom. The Mammy is represented by the fat, nurturing, black female domestic worker. Uncle Tom, is the elderly, submissive, male servant. Blanche and Nate view their role as the Mammy and Uncle Tom separate from their true identities. "They view the stereotypical roles as their performance in a larger satire about misperception. They slip into and out of the Mammy and Uncle Tom stereotype as they see fit." "A cleansing construction: Blanche White as domestic heroine in Barbara Neely's Blanche on the Lam".

== Critical reception ==
According to Elsie Washington in a review for Essence, the novel is considered "the first mystery by a black woman with a Black woman as the heroine".

Neely scored major accolades with her first novel, winning the Agatha, Anthony, and Macavity Awards for Blanche on the Lam. She also received an award from the Black Women’s Reading Club for the book.

== See also ==
- Jawole Willa Jo Zollar
