= Bootlegger's Daughter =

1992 book written by Margaret Maron

- First edition
- Author: Margaret Maron
- Genre: Mystery fiction, Thriller
- Published: 1992
- Publisher: Mysterious Press
- Pages: 272
- Awards: Anthony Award for Best Novel (1993)
- ISBN: 978-0-7862-2327-5
- Website: Bootlegger's Daughter

Bootlegger's Daughter is a book written by Margaret Maron and published by Mysterious Press on May 1, 1992. It later went on to win the Anthony Award for Best Novel in 1993. It was also awarded the 1993 Edgar and Agatha Awards for Best Novel.
