= Void Moon =

1999 novel by Michael Connelly

- Author: Michael Connelly
- Language: English
- Genre: Crime, mystery, thriller
- Publisher: Little, Brown, and Company
- Publication date: December 7, 1999
- Publication place: United States
- Media type: Print
- Pages: 407 pp
- ISBN: 978-0-316-15406-2 Hardcover; ISBN 978-0-446-60914-2 Paperback

Void Moon is a crime thriller novel, and the ninth novel by American author Michael Connelly, and was the third of Connelly's books not to follow the character Harry Bosch. It was also his first novel to feature a female protagonist, Cassidy "Cassie" Black, and a protagonist who is a criminal instead of an investigator of criminals.

== Plot summary ==
Cassie Black is an ex-convict who works at a Porsche dealership. She had served five years in prison for conspiring with her previous partner-in-crime, Max Freeling, to steal the winnings of casino visitors while they were asleep. The last plan failed when an undercover investigator posed as the victim, forcing Max to take his own life. Unknown to all, Cassie and Max have a daughter named Jodie, who was born when Cassie was imprisoned. Jodie was put up for adoption and Cassie has been tracking her development silently. When Cassie learns that Jodie will soon be moving to Paris with her adopted parents, she decides to return to theft in order to secure the funds needed to run away with her.

Cassie approaches Max's half-brother, Leo Renfro, for a heist job. Leo assigns her to go back to the Cleopatra, or "the Cleo", the casino in which the failed theft took place. Leo is confident of Cassie's abilities despite her long hiatus but warns her to avoid being in hotel room of her target, a high roller, during the period of the "void moon" on the day of action. Cassie successfully breaks into the room but is forced to remain hidden during the period of the void moon due to unforeseen circumstances. Later that morning, it is revealed that the high roller has been shot dead and the suitcase containing the money had been taken from the safe.

It is revealed that high roller was actually a courier for Cuban gangsters in Miami, and that he had been carrying $2.5 million in the suitcase as partial payoff for rights to buy the Cleo. The casino's chief of security, Vincent Grimaldi, hires private investigator Jack Karch–the undercover agent involved in the heist that ended in Max's death–to recover the money. Jack is briefed by Grimaldi that Leo has conspired with Chicago mobsters for this latest heist. He successfully tracks down the supplier of Cassie's equipment for the theft and obtains her name.

Meanwhile, Cassie persuades Leo to split the money and leave after learning of its origin. Leo requests two days to sort the mess out but commits suicide when confronted by Jack. The next day, Jack poses as a customer at the dealership and Cassie takes him out for a car ride. She successfully crashes the car upon learning about Jack's intent and returns to Leo's house to retrieve the money. Jack plans to ambush Cassie at her house, but instead injures her parole officer once he learns about Jodie. Jack successfully "abducts" Jodie before the police arrive and drives her to the Cleo to set up a meeting with Cassie three hours later. Unknown to Jack, Cassie arrives much earlier and devises a plan to rescue Jodie and frame Jack in the process.

Grimaldi captures Jack and reveals that the whole plan was a setup because the Miami gangsters would never be approved to buy the Cleo; his thugs killed the courier, and Miami will now search for Jack as the thief. Using a concealed weapon, Jack kills Grimaldi and his thugs in the elevator. He returns to the room to kill Cassie and Jodie but, momentarily distracted, allows Cassie to push him out of the window to his death. Cassie throws money out of the window to cause a commotion, allowing her and Jodie to flee unnoticed. Realizing that she will be unable to provide an enjoyable life for Jodie as a murder suspect, Cassie returns Jodie to her adoptive parents and drives off with the remainder of the money.

== Connections with other Connelly works ==
Cassie Black makes a cameo appearance (using her new name) in The Narrows (2004) and is referenced by attorney Mickey Haller as a former client in The Brass Verdict (2008). In A Darkness More Than Night, Terry McCaleb sees a banner at the police station that reads "Welcome Back Thelma!", an obvious reference to the parole officer's injuries. The injured parole officer appears again in The Closers (2005) during one of Bosch's investigations, and Bosch recognizes Cassie's mugshot in a newspaper article in her cubicle. Leo mentions the shootout in Trunk Music that killed Joseph "Marks" Marconi as background for how the Chicago mobsters got him the job for which he used Cassie.
