= The Narrows (Connelly novel) =

2004 novel by Michael Connelly

- First edition
- Author: Michael Connelly
- Language: English
- Series: Harry Bosch
- Release number: 10
- Genre: Crime, mystery, thriller
- Publisher: Little, Brown and Company
- Publication date: April 30, 2004
- Publication place: United States
- Media type: Print (hardcover, paperback)
- Pages: 416
- ISBN: 0-316-15530-6
- OCLC: 53814241
- Dewey Decimal: 813/.54 22
- LC Class: PS3553.O51165 N37 2004
- Preceded by: Lost Light
- Followed by: The Closers

The Narrows is a crime thriller novel, and the fourteenth novel by American author Michael Connelly, and the tenth featuring the Los Angeles detective Hieronymus "Harry" Bosch. As Bosch crosses paths with FBI Agent Rachel Walling, the novel ties story elements left unresolved in The Poet and those from Blood Work and A Darkness More Than Night together into the Bosch mythos.

The book was published on April 30, 2004 by Little, Brown and Company.

== Plot ==
Harry Bosch is drawn into a case concerning the death of former FBI profiler Terry McCaleb. McCaleb's wife asks Bosch to examine what happened, and Bosch soon begins to suspect that Robert Backus, the former FBI supervisor known as The Poet, may have returned. Backus was believed to have died, but Bosch finds reasons to doubt that assumption. His search takes him to Las Vegas, where he encounters FBI agents working on matters concerning Backus.

At the same time, FBI agent Rachel Walling receives messages from Backus. Walling once worked under him and had spent four years assigned to South Dakota after an FBI inquiry. She is brought back into the case as the messages become more troubling. Walling has her own reasons for wanting to find Backus, though she does not have the full support of her colleagues.

Bosch and Walling are kept outside much of the FBI's official inquiry. Their shared interest in finding Backus eventually brings them together, and they begin working as a pair. The book alternates between Bosch's first-person account and third-person passages centered on Walling and Backus, allowing the reader to see the case from several viewpoints.

During his search, Bosch encounters a woman living nearby whom he later learns is Cassie Black. He also becomes romantically involved with Walling. At the same time, Bosch considers a return to the Los Angeles Police Department. His former partner, Kiz Rider, offers him a position under a new police chief, working as a homicide detective in the Open-Unsolved Unit of the Robbery-Homicide Division. Bosch accepts the position.

The search for Backus eventually brings Bosch and Walling to the concrete channels of the Los Angeles River during a period of heavy water flow. They pursue him through the river channel, where Backus dies by drowning. Bosch nearly dies as well but survives. This time, Backus's death is confirmed, ending the uncertainty surrounding his fate from the earlier novel.

Afterward, Bosch learns that the FBI had already determined that Backus was not responsible for McCaleb's death. The bureau had withheld that fact from Bosch while he was searching for Backus. The discovery damages his trust in Walling and brings their romance to an end.

Bosch then learns what really happened to McCaleb. His heart transplant had begun to fail, and he did not want his wife and children to face the enormous cost of additional medical treatment. McCaleb therefore took his own life while making it appear to have been an accident. His death had no connection to Backus. The book closes with Bosch facing the consequences of what he has learned, while returning to his career with the LAPD.
