= City of Bones (Connelly novel) =

2002 novel by Michael Connelly

- Hardcover edition
- Author: Michael Connelly
- Language: English
- Series: Harry Bosch
- Release number: 8
- Genre: Crime, mystery, thriller
- Publisher: Little, Brown and Company
- Publication date: April 16, 2002
- Publication place: United States
- Media type: Print (hardcover, paperback)
- Pages: 464
- ISBN: 0-316-15405-9
- OCLC: 66887944
- Dewey Decimal: 813/.54 21
- LC Class: PS3553.O51165 C5 2002
- Preceded by: A Darkness More Than Night
- Followed by: Lost Light

City of Bones is a crime thriller novel, and the twelfth novel by American crime author Michael Connelly, and the eighth featuring the Los Angeles detective Hieronymus "Harry" Bosch.

The book was published on April 16, 2002, it was named a Notable Book of the Year by the New York Times.

== Plot ==
On New Year's Day, Bosch is working holiday call-out duty in Hollywood Division when retired physician Dr. Paul Guyot reports that his dog brought home a child's upper-arm bone from a wooded hillside above Wonderland Avenue in Laurel Canyon. Bosch goes there alone. At Guyot's house, he meets rookie patrol officer Julia Brasher and her training partner Edgewood. Beneath acacia trees, Bosch finds more bones in disturbed soil. Teresa Corazon, the county medical examiner, confirms that they are human.

By morning, officers, criminalists, and reporters fill the area. Forensic archaeologist Kathy Kohl supervises an excavation. Brasher finds a child's skull showing fractures and signs of earlier surgery. About sixty percent of the skeleton is recovered, together with damaged clothing, a canvas backpack marked with a "B," and a 1975 quarter.

Dr. William Golliher identifies the remains as a boy about twelve or thirteen who had been dead for roughly twenty to twenty-five years. His bones show repeated injuries dating back to early childhood, including broken ribs, arm fractures, facial injuries, and three skull fractures. One skull injury had required trephine surgery about six months before his death. His fatal injury came from a hard blow. Bosch decides to identify the boy and find whoever killed him.

Bosch begins seeing Brasher, a former lawyer who joined the LAPD. Their relationship violates department rules because Bosch is a supervisor. Computer checks of Wonderland Avenue residents bring up Nicholas Trent, a set decorator with a 1966 child-molestation conviction. Bosch searches Trent's house while Edgar interviews him. Reporter Judy Surtain later broadcasts Trent's criminal record. Bosch discovers that Rick Thornton, Rider's new partner, leaked the information. Trent loses his job and is found hanged the next morning. A note claims responsibility is not his, while evidence shows he had spent years supporting children's charities.

Deputy Chief Irvin Irving urges Bosch to blame Trent, but the dates do not fit. Then Sheila Delacroix calls. Her brother Arthur disappeared on May 4, 1980, aged twelve. He had undergone brain surgery after what the family called a skateboard accident. Golliher compares old hospital X-rays with the skull and confirms Arthur's identity. Arthur's father, Samuel Delacroix, is an alcoholic former actor living in a trailer park. His mother, Christine Waters, left the family when Arthur was two. Arthur's friend Johnny Stokes, an older boy with a criminal record, has also disappeared.

Bosch and Edgar investigate the family. Samuel admits to killing Arthur with a baseball bat and burying him on the hillside. Bosch doubts the confession because Samuel could not reasonably have carried the body up the steep slope while drunk. He later finds photographs documenting Samuel's abuse of Sheila. Bosch suspects Sheila had repeatedly hurt Arthur and that Samuel confessed to protect her.

Sheila eventually admits that she saw Arthur preparing to leave home on the day he disappeared. He left alive. A criminalist then finds "1980 A.D." scratched beneath a skateboard connected to Trent's house. Bosch traces it to a foster home where Stokes lived in 1980. The evidence indicates Arthur went to Stokes after leaving home, and Stokes killed him on the hillside.

Because Stokes was only thirteen, prosecution is unlikely. Police later raid the Hotel Usher, where Stokes is staying. Edgewood shoots and kills him under disputed circumstances, and the case is closed without a trial. Arthur is buried at Forest Lawn. Bosch gives Christine a box of letters from Trent's charities. That night, Bosch finds Brasher's note. He places his badge, identification, and gun in his desk, leaves the key with Lt. Grace Billets, walks out of Hollywood Division, and waits for a cab in the rain.

== Television series ==
All seven seasons of the Amazon Prime Video series Bosch are based on Connelly's books. The events of City of Bones, together with those of The Concrete Blonde and Echo Park, serve as the basis for the first season. The main plot of the discovered bones and Bosch's tumultuous relationship with Brasher feature heavily in the show.
