= The Late Show (novel) =

2017 novel by Michael Connelly

- Hardcover edition
- Author: Michael Connelly
- Language: English
- Series: Renée Ballard
- Release number: 1
- Genre: Crime, mystery, thriller
- Publisher: Little, Brown and Company
- Publication date: July 18, 2017
- Publication place: United States
- Media type: Print (hardback & paperback)
- Pages: 405
- ISBN: 978-0-316-22598-4
- OCLC: 971339086
- Dewey Decimal: 813/.54
- LC Class: PS3553.O51165 L38 2017
- Followed by: Dark Sacred Night

The Late Show is a crime thriller novel, and the thirtieth novel by American author Michael Connelly. It is his first book about Los Angeles Police Department detective Renée Ballard, taking place in the same literary universe as Harry Bosch.

The book was published on July 18, 2017 by Little, Brown and Company.

== Plot ==
Renée Ballard is an LAPD detective assigned to Hollywood Division's night duty after filing a sexual harassment complaint against Lieutenant Robert Olivas. Her partner, Ken Chastain, refused to support her, damaging her standing among fellow officers. Ballard handles overnight reports, while daytime detectives receive most assignments. Her first call concerns a burglary at an elderly woman's home, accompanied by John Jenkins.

Ballard and Jenkins visit Hollywood Presbyterian Hospital, where Ramona Ramone, a transgender sex worker, lies comatose after an assault with brass knuckles. Ballard wants to handle the assault herself, but police rules threaten to take the case away from her. A separate emergency concerns a mass shooting at The Dancers, a Santa Monica nightclub. Jenkins heads to the club while Ballard stays with waitress Cynthia Haddel at the hospital, Haddel dies from her injuries. Ballard gathers her belongings before visiting the club, where four other people have died. She opens Haddel's locker and finds a vial of drugs.

At the club, Ballard encounters Olivas, his conduct strengthens her resolve to continue her duties in the face of restrictions from supervisors. She visits the morgue, takes Haddel's fingerprints, and accesses her phone. She then joins Jenkins at Haddel's apartment, Ballard tells Haddel's parents about their daughter's death before returning to the station to finish paperwork and interview a club witness.

Chastain arrives to question the witness and attempts to apologize for abandoning Ballard during her complaint against Olivas. She rejects his apology, unwilling to forgive his betrayal. After work, Ballard returns to her Venice Beach home, where she sleeps inside a tent with her dog, Lola. She surfs at dawn, then visits police records to examine Ramone's assault independently. Her search leads her to Thomas Trent, previously arrested for possessing brass knuckles matching those used against Ramone.

Ballard examines both cases beyond her assigned hours, risking disciplinary action. Her inquiries raise the possibility that Ramone's assault resembles other attacks. Meanwhile, the nightclub evidence indicates a deliberate killing disguised as a mass shooting. Haddel's drug dealings may explain why she became a target.

The colleagues and supervisors resist her efforts, but Ballard gathers evidence and interviews witnesses. Her efforts expose flaws in the department's handling of both cases and bring renewed attention to Ramone's assault.

Ballard names Ramone's attacker and determines the motive behind the nightclub shooting. Her findings support her decisions in the face of repeated attempts to restrict her duties. She regains confidence in her abilities and renews her dedication to police service, paving the way for her later association with Harry Bosch.
