= The Overlook =

2007 crime novel by Michael Connelly

- Hardcover edition
- Author: Michael Connelly
- Language: English
- Series: Harry Bosch
- Release number: 13
- Genre: Crime, mystery, thriller
- Publisher: Little, Brown and Company
- Publication date: May 22, 2007
- Publication place: United States
- Media type: Print (hardback & paperback)
- Pages: 240
- ISBN: 0-316-01895-3
- OCLC: 78893574
- Dewey Decimal: 813/.54 22
- LC Class: PS3553.O51165 O94 2007
- Preceded by: Echo Park
- Followed by: Nine Dragons

The Overlook is a crime thriller novel, and the eighteenth novel by American author Michael Connelly, and the thirteenth featuring the Los Angeles detective Hieronymus "Harry" Bosch.

The novel first appeared in serialised form in The New York Times Magazine, in 16 installments published from September 17, 2006 to January 21, 2007, while an edited and expanded version of the novel was published on May 22, 2007 by Little, Brown and Company.

The title of the book is in reference to the scene of the crime in the opening chapter. The location described in the novel is based on an actual overlook above the Hollywood Reservoir and Mulholland Dam, located on the 3100 block of Canyon Lake Drive in the Hollywood Hills neighborhood of Los Angeles.

== Plot ==
Harry Bosch returns to homicide duty after transferring to the Los Angeles Police Department's Homicide Special squad. Dr. Stanley Kent lies dead at Mulholland Dam, shot twice in the back of the head. Kent's hospital identification badge and radiation-monitoring rings identify him as a medical physicist with access to radioactive caesium. FBI agent Rachel Walling arrives, and Bosch learns that she had visited Kent before his death.

At Kent's home, Bosch and Walling find Alicia Kent tied up. She says two men forced her to surrender her husband's gun, her car keys, and her email password. A ransom message demanded that Kent steal caesium and deliver it to the overlook. At Saint Agatha's clinic, the detectives and federal agents find that Kent removed 32 radioactive capsules from a secure safe. His note says that his wife was being held hostage.

The missing caesium alarms federal authorities, who fear an attack using a dirty bomb. The FBI and the Department of Homeland Security take control of the search, while Bosch insists on pursuing Kent's murder. His young partner, Ignacio Ferras, worries that Bosch's refusal to follow federal direction will damage his own career.

Bosch interviews Jesse Mitford, a young man who witnessed the shooting from nearby. Mitford recalls gunshots, flashes, and several vehicles, including a Porsche. Although he cannot identify the gunman, his account gives Bosch a fresh source of evidence. Bosch also examines Kent's phone records and emails, which help clarify the hours before his death.

Federal officials suspect Ramin Samir, a controversial former professor, and arrange a raid on his home after a vehicle associated with the case is found nearby. Captain Don Hadley supports the operation. Bosch doubts that Samir is responsible, but the raid proceeds, ending in gunfire and Samir's injury. The operation fails to locate the missing radioactive capsules.

Bosch continues examining the Kent household. He notices that a yoga poster has been removed from a wall and later learns that a matching poster was found in a rubbish container holding the missing caesium. He compares the image with the photograph used to support Alicia's account of her captivity. The resemblance leads him to suspect that Alicia staged her own restraint.

Bosch comes to believe that Alicia and FBI agent Clifford Maxwell conspired to kill Kent for financial gain. The apparent terrorist threat served as cover for a domestic murder. Maxwell's access to federal resources helped divert attention from the couple's actions. When Bosch's theory becomes clear, Maxwell kills Alicia and attempts to escape.

Bosch resolves the case, and the missing caesium is recovered. However, exposure to radiation leaves him physically unwell. The case also strains his partnership with Ferras and his dealings with Walling, who must reconsider her earlier doubts about Bosch's judgment.

== Characters ==
- Harry Bosch, the lead detective on the case, who is the principal protagonist of this and twelve previous Harry Bosch novels.
- Rachel Walling, who was romantically involved with Harry in a number of previous Harry Bosch novels. In this story, while Harry has hopes of re-connecting with Rachel, their relationship is strained, owing to conflicting views on how the investigation should be carried out.
- Ignacio "Iggy" Ferras, Bosch's young partner. Iggy wants to play by the book and is seriously disturbed by Bosch's let's-break-the-rules attitude. At one point, he tells Bosch that he cannot work with him and will be requesting a new partner.
- Stanley Kent, the murder victim who has stolen 32 sources of caesium from a Los Angeles hospital in response to demands from unknown parties who have taken his wife hostage. If used in a dirty bomb, tens of thousands of people could die from radiation exposure.
- Alicia Kent, the beautiful wife of the murder victim, who was taken hostage in her home by two intruders. She was used by the intruders to pressure Stanley Kent to steal the caesium from the hospital.
- Jack Brenner, Rachel Walling's FBI partner and superior and the lead FBI agent on the case. His primary concern is dealing with the terror threat associated with the stolen caesium. To him, Bosch's homicide investigation is a secondary concern.
- Clifford Maxwell, an FBI agent working on the case, with whom Bosch has two violent encounters.
