= Blood Work (film) =

2002 film by Clint Eastwood

- Theatrical release poster
- Directed by: Clint Eastwood
- Screenplay by: Brian Helgeland
- Based on: Blood Work by Michael Connelly
- Produced by: Clint Eastwood
- Starring: Clint Eastwood; Jeff Daniels; Wanda De Jesús; Tina Lifford; Paul Rodriguez; Dylan Walsh; Anjelica Huston
- Cinematography: Tom Stern
- Edited by: Joel Cox
- Music by: Lennie Niehaus
- Production company: Malpaso Productions
- Distributed by: Warner Bros. Pictures
- Release date: August 9, 2002
- Running time: 110 minutes
- Country: United States
- Language: English
- Budget: $50 million
- Box office: $31.8 million

Blood Work is a 2002 American mystery thriller film starring, produced, and directed by Clint Eastwood. It co-stars Jeff Daniels, Wanda De Jesús, and Anjelica Huston. The story is an adaptation of the 1997 novel of the same name by Michael Connelly.

Blood Work released by Warner Bros. Pictures on August 9, 2002. The film received mixed reviews from critics and was a box-office bomb, grossing $31.8 million against a $50 million budget. Eastwood won the Future Film Festival Digital Award at the Venice Film Festival for his work on the film.

== Plot ==
FBI Special Agent Terry McCaleb, a veteran criminal profiler, leads a joint FBI-LAPD task force to capture the "Code Killer", a serial murderer who leaves taunting messages for McCaleb. While addressing reporters at the latest crime scene, McCaleb sees what he believes to be the killer in the crowd and pursues him only to suffer a near-fatal heart attack.

Two years later, the now retired McCaleb lives out of his fishing boat, Following Sea, on the Long Beach bay, having received a heart transplant. He is approached by waitress Graciella Rivers; her sister, Gloria, was murdered during a robbery and she asks him to solve the case. He discovers that the heart transplanted into him was Gloria's. Struggling with survivor's guilt, McCaleb agrees to help her.

Against the advice of his physician, McCaleb conducts an illegal investigation into Gloria's death, aided by his alcoholic neighbor Jasper "Buddy" Noone and a former colleague, LASD Detective Jaye Winston. He discovers that the killer committed a previous murder and identifies two potential suspects, both of whom wind up dead. Eventually, he realizes that the Code Killer is responsible, and pieces together that he and Noone are one and the same. Buddy confesses that he killed Gloria to ensure that McCaleb would be saved.

Declaring his intention to "resume the game" between them, Buddy reveals that he has kidnapped Graciella and her nephew, Gloria's son Raymond. McCaleb forces him to reveal that they are trapped on a wrecked Coast Guard cutter in the bay. He rescues them and shoots Buddy before Graciella holds his head underwater to get revenge for her sister. With his past behind him, McCaleb starts a relationship with Graciella and takes her and Raymond out on his boat.

== Cast ==
- Clint Eastwood as Terry McCaleb
- Jeff Daniels as Jasper "Buddy" Noone
- Anjelica Huston as Dr. Bonnie Fox
- Wanda De Jesús as Graciella Rivers
- Tina Lifford as LASD Detective Jaye Winston
- Paul Rodriguez as LAPD Detective Ronaldo Arrango
- Dylan Walsh as LAPD Detective John Waller
- Rick Hoffman as James Lockridge
- Alix Koromzay as Mrs. Cordell
- Igor Jijikine as Mikhail Bolotov
- Glenn Morshower as Captain
- Dina Eastwood as Reporter #1
- Beverly Leech as Reporter #2
- Maria Quiban as Gloria Torres
- Gerry Becker as Mr. Toliver
- P. J. Byrne as Forensics Worker
- Brent Hinkley as Cab Driver

== Production ==
Blood Work was filmed in spring 2002 in Los Angeles and Long Beach, California, in 38 days.

== Reception ==
Blood Work received mixed reviews. Rotten Tomatoes shows a score of 51% with a mean of 5.7 of a possible 10, calling it "a routine, but competently made thriller marred by lethargic pacing." Metacritic, which uses a weighted average, assigned the film a score of 64 out of 100, based on 34 critics, indicating "generally favorable" reviews. Audiences polled by CinemaScore gave the film an average grade of "B" on an A+ to F scale.

A. O. Scott of The New York Times wrote that while it was similar to many Eastwood films, "there is something comforting in seeing this old warhorse trot gamely out of the gate for yet another run on familiar turf."

The film was a box office disappointment, grossing $31.8 million worldwide on a budget of $50 million.
