= The Closers =

2005 novel by Michael Connelly

- First edition
- Author: Michael Connelly
- Language: English
- Series: Harry Bosch
- Release number: 11
- Genre: Crime, mystery, thriller
- Publisher: Little, Brown and Company
- Publication date: May 16, 2005
- Publication place: United States
- Media type: Print (hardcover, paperback)
- Pages: 416
- ISBN: 0-316-73494-2
- OCLC: 57414458
- Dewey Decimal: 813/.54 22
- LC Class: PS3553.O51165 C58 2005b
- Preceded by: The Narrows
- Followed by: Echo Park

The Closers is a crime thriller novel, and the fifteenth novel by American author Michael Connelly, and the eleventh featuring the Los Angeles detective Hieronymus "Harry" Bosch.

The book was published on May 16, 2005 by Little, Brown and Company, this novel features a return to an omniscient third-person style narration after the previous two, set during Bosch's retirement (Lost Light and The Narrows), were narrated in from a first-person perspective.

== Plot ==
Harry Bosch returns to the Los Angeles Police Department after spending three years away. The department has undergone major changes, and Bosch is assigned to the Open-Unsolved Unit, where detectives revisit old murder cases. He is paired with Kiz Rider, his former partner and one of the people who supported his return.

Their first case concerns Rebecca Verloren, a sixteen-year-old girl who was killed in 1988. Her murder remained unsolved for almost two decades. New DNA testing identifies Roland Mackey as a possible suspect. Mackey has associations with white supremacist groups, raising the possibility that Rebecca was targeted because she was of mixed race.

Bosch and Rider review the original police files and retrace the investigation conducted years earlier. They speak with former detectives and return to people who knew Rebecca and her family. The old case contains gaps that may have prevented the police from identifying the killer. Bosch studies witness accounts, laboratory records, and other material that may have been overlooked.

Rebecca's parents have spent many years living with the loss of their daughter. Her father has struggled badly since her death, while her mother has kept Rebecca's bedroom almost untouched. Bosch becomes increasingly aware of the human cost of an unsolved murder. For him, bringing an old case to an answer means giving the victim's family an opportunity to move beyond years of uncertainty.

The search for answers takes Bosch and Rider into Los Angeles's white supremacist circles. They examine Mackey's past and his association with people who held racist beliefs. The case also brings back memories of racial divisions in Los Angeles during the years before the Rodney King beating and the unrest that followed.

Bosch faces opposition inside the police department as he continues his investigation. Deputy Chief Irvin Irving, an old adversary, remains skeptical of Bosch and would welcome an opportunity to discredit him. Bosch therefore has to balance police procedures with his determination to pursue every reasonable avenue.

As the case progresses, Bosch finds evidence that changes his understanding of what happened to Rebecca. The investigation shows how an old murder can remain unresolved when important clues are missed or not pursued. Bosch and Rider continue working through the available evidence until they can establish what happened on the night Rebecca died and identify the person responsible.

The case gives Bosch a difficult return to police service. It also reinforces his commitment to victims whose cases have been forgotten. By revisiting Rebecca's murder years after her death, he demonstrates that time does not necessarily erase a family's need for answers. The search brings long-delayed answers to a case that had remained open for almost twenty years.

== Major characters ==
- Harry Bosch: Harry Bosch is the lead detective in the story. Bosch returns to LAPD after a three-year retirement. He works in the open-unsolved (cold cases) division of the force. He is an intelligent detective who leaves no stone unturned. He is the only member of his police academy class still working for the LAPD.
- Kizmin Rider: Kizmin "Kiz" Rider is an African American detective with the Los Angeles Police Department. She initially worked robbery and fraud in the Pacific Division before moving to the homicide table in the Hollywood Division, where she was assigned to Squad One along with Harry Bosch and Jerry Edgar. She persuaded the chief to take Harry back into service.
