= Dilys Award =

Defunct literary award

The Dilys Award was presented every year from 1992 to 2014 by the Independent Mystery Booksellers Association. It was given to the mystery title of the year which the member booksellers have most enjoyed selling. The Independent Mystery Booksellers Association is an association of retail businesses that are either wholly or substantially devoted to the sale of mystery books. The Dilys award is named after Dilys Winn, who became the first specialty bookseller of mystery books in the United States.

== Awards ==
Award winners and finalists
Year	Author	Title	Result	Ref.
1992	Carl Hiaasen	Native Tongue	Winner	
1992	Elizabeth George	A Suitable Vengeance	Finalist	
1992	Stephen Greenleaf	Book Case	Finalist	
1992	J.A. Jance	Hour of the Hunter	Finalist	
1992	Valerie Wolzien	We Wish You A Merry Murder	Finalist	
1993	John Dunning	Booked to Die	Winner	
1993	Michael Connelly	The Black Echo	Finalist	
1993	Margaret Maron	Bootlegger's Daughter	Finalist	
1993	Minette Walters	The Ice House	Finalist	
1994	Peter Høeg	Smilla's Sense of Snow	Winner	
1994	Marcia Muller	Wolf in the Shadows	Finalist	
1994	Sharan Newman	Death Comes As Epiphany	Finalist	
1994	Sandra West Prowell	By Evil Means	Finalist	
1994	Steven Saylor	Catilina's Riddle	Finalist	
1994	Minette Walters	The Sculptress	Finalist	
1994	Don Winslow	Way Down on the High Lonely	Finalist	
1995	Janet Evanovich	One for the Money	Winner	
1995	Jeff Abbott	Do Unto Others	Finalist	
1995	Nancy Atherton	Aunt Dimity and the Duke	Finalist	
1995	Nevada Barr	A Superior Death	Finalist	
1995	Michael Connelly	The Concrete Blonde	Finalist	
1995	Carol O'Connell	Mallory's Oracle	Finalist	
1995	Susan Wade	Walking Rain	Finalist	
1996	Michael Connelly	The Last Coyote	Winner	
1996	Robert Crais	Voodoo River	Finalist	
1996	G. M. Ford	Who in Hell is Wanda Fuca?	Finalist	
1996	Sharyn McCrumb	If I'd Killed Him When I Met Him	Finalist	
1996	Tom Topor	The Codicil	Finalist	
1997	Michael Connelly	The Poet	Winner	
1997	Harlan Coben	Fade Away	Finalist	
1997	Margaret Lawrence	Hearts and Bones	Finalist	
1997	Dennis Lehane	Darkness, Take My Hand	Finalist	
1997	Michael McGarrity	Tularosa	Finalist	
1997	Steve Oliver	Moody Gets the Blues	Finalist	
1997	Thomas Perry	Dance for the Dead	Finalist	
1997	Charles Todd	A Test of Wills	Finalist	
1998	Janet Evanovich	Three to Get Deadly	Winner	
1998	Lee Child	Killing Floor	Finalist	
1998	Harlan Coben	Back Spin	Finalist	
1998	Dennis Lehane	Sacred	Finalist	
1998	Kathy Reichs	Déjà Dead	Finalist	
1998	Kate Ross	The Devil in Music	Finalist	
1999	Dennis Lehane	Gone, Baby, Gone	Winner	
1999	Nevada Barr	Blind Descent	Finalist	
1999	Richard Barre	The Ghosts of Morning	Finalist	
1999	James Lee Burke	Sunset Limited	Finalist	
1999	William Kent Krueger	Iron Lake	Finalist	
1999	Charles Todd	Wings of Fire	Finalist	
2000	Robert Crais	L.A. Requiem	Winner	
2000	Rennie Airth	River of Darkness	Finalist	
2000	Donna Andrews	Murder with Peacocks	Finalist	
2000	William Kent Krueger	Boundary Waters	Finalist	
2000	Don Winslow	California Fire and Life	Finalist	
2001	Val McDermid	A Place of Execution	Winner	
2001	Sarah Caudwell	The Sibyl in Her Grave	Finalist	
2001	Tim Cockey	The Hearse You Came in On	Finalist	
2001	Robert Crais	Demolition Angel	Finalist	
2001	Janet Evanovich	Hot Six	Finalist	
2002	Dennis Lehane	Mystic River	Winner	
2002	David Handler	The Cold Blue Blood	Finalist	
2002	Charlaine Harris	Dead Until Dark	Finalist	
2002	William Kent Krueger	Purgatory Ridge	Finalist	
2002	Peter Lovesey	The Reaper	Finalist	
2003	Julia Spencer-Fleming	In the Bleak Midwinter	Winner	
2003	Donna Andrews	You've Got Murder	Finalist	
2003	Lee Child	Without Fail	Finalist	
2003	Jasper Fforde	The Eyre Affair	Finalist	
2003	George Pelecanos	Hell to Pay	Finalist	
2004	Jasper Fforde	Lost in a Good Book	Winner	
2004	Donna Andrews	Crouching Buzzard, Leaping Loon	Finalist	
2004	William Brodrick	The Sixth Lamentation	Finalist	
2004	P. J. Tracy	Monkeewrench	Finalist	
2004	Jacqueline Winspear	Maisie Dobbs	Finalist	
2005	Jeff Lindsay	Darkly Dreaming Dexter	Winner	
2005	Lee Child	The Enemy	Finalist	
2005	Jasper Fforde	Something Rotten	Finalist	
2005	Leslie Silbert	The Intelligencer	Finalist	
2005	Jacqueline Winspear	Birds of a Feather	Finalist	
2005	Carlos Ruiz Zafon	The Shadow of the Wind	Finalist	
2006	Colin Cotterill	Thirty-Three Teeth	Winner	
2006	Terence Faherty	In a Teapot	Finalist	
2006	Craig Johnson	The Cold Dish	Finalist	
2006	Morag Joss	Half Broken Things	Finalist	
2006	Mark Schweitzer	The Tenor Wore Tapshoes	Finalist	
2006	Don Winslow	The Power of the Dog	Finalist	
2007	Louise Penny	Still Life	Winner	
2007	James R. Benn	Billy Boyle	Finalist	
2007	Steve Hockensmith	Holmes on the Range	Finalist	
2007	John J. Lamb	Mournful Teddy	Finalist	
2007	Nancy Pickard	The Virgin of the Small Plains	Finalist	
2007	Diane Setterfield	The Thirteenth Tale	Finalist	
2008	William Kent Krueger	Thunder Bay	Winner	
2008	Rhys Bowen	Her Royal Spyness	Finalist	
2008	Lisa Lutz	The Spellman Files	Finalist	
2008	Deanna Raybourn	Silent in the Grave	Finalist	
2008	Marcus Sakey	The Blade Itself	Finalist	
2009	Sean Chercover	Trigger City	Winner	
2009	Christopher Fowler	The Victoria Vanishes	Finalist	
2009	Deanna Raybourn	Silent in the Sanctuary	Finalist	
2009	Tom Rob Smith	Child 44	Finalist	
2009	Don Winslow	Dawn Patrol	Finalist	
2010	Alan Bradley	The Sweetness at the Bottom of the Pie	Winner	
2010	R. J. Ellory	A Quiet Belief in Angels	Finalist	
2010	Craig Johnson	The Dark Horse	Finalist	
2010	Stieg Larsson	The Girl Who Played with Fire	Finalist	
2010	Stuart Neville	The Ghosts of Belfast	Finalist	
2010	Louise Penny	The Brutal Telling	Finalist	
2010	S. J. Rozan	The Shanghai Moon	Finalist	
2011	Louise Penny	Bury Your Dead	Winner	
2011	Colin Cotterill	Love Songs from a Shallow Grave	Finalist	
2011	Steve Hamilton	The Lock Artist	Finalist	
2011	Dennis Lehane	Moonlight Mile	Finalist	
2011	Keith Thomson	Once a Spy	Finalist	
2011	Don Winslow	Savages	Finalist	
2012	S. J. Rozan	Ghost Hero	Winner	
2012	Tim Dorsey	When Elves Attack	Finalist	
2012	G. M. Malliet	Wicked Autumn	Finalist	
2012	Archer Mayor	Tag Man	Finalist	
2012	Louise Penny	A Trick of the Light	Finalist	
2013	Peter Robinson	Before the Poison	Winner	
2013	Colin Cotterill	Grandad, There's a Head on the Beach	Finalist	
2013	Tana French	Broken Harbor	Finalist	
2013	Susan Elia MacNeal	Mr. Churchill's Secretary	Finalist	
2013	Chris Pavone	The Expats	Finalist	
2014	William Kent Krueger	Ordinary Grace	Winner	
2014	Lyndsay Faye	Seven for a Secret	Finalist	
2014	Alex Grecian	The Black Country	Finalist	
2014	Anne Hillerman	Spider Woman's Daughter	Finalist	
2014	G. M. Malliet	Pagan Spring	Finalist	
2014	Vidar Sundstol	The Land of Dreams	Finalist	
