= Resurrection Walk =

2023 novel by Michael Connelly

- Hardcover edition
- Author: Michael Connelly
- Language: English
- Series: Mickey Haller
- Release number: 7
- Genre: Crime, mystery, thriller
- Publisher: Little, Brown and Company
- Publication date: November 7, 2023
- Publication place: United States
- Media type: Print (hardback & paperback)
- Pages: 405
- ISBN: 978-0-316-56376-5
- OCLC: 1365615544
- Dewey Decimal: 813/.54
- LC Class: PS3553.O51165
- Preceded by: The Law of Innocence
- Followed by: The Proving Ground

Resurrection Walk is a crime thriller novel, and the thirty-eighth novel by American author Michael Connelly and his seventh to feature Los Angeles criminal defense attorney Mickey Haller. The novel follows Mickey Haller as he starts to follow a new sort of calling in his career: working to bring justice to those who have been wrongfully convicted. It also features Haller's half-brother, Harry Bosch, who assists him in his capacity as a private investigator.

The book was published on November 7, 2023 by Little, Brown and Company.

== Plot ==
Mickey Haller, a Los Angeles criminal defense attorney, recounts Jorge Ochoa's release from Corcoran State Prison after fourteen years of wrongful imprisonment for murder. The exoneration inspires Haller to establish an innocence review project for inmates claiming wrongful convictions. He appoints retired LAPD detective Harry Bosch to review submissions, partly because Haller secured him health insurance and access to a UCLA clinical trial for leukemia.

One letter comes from Lucinda Sanz, imprisoned for the manslaughter of her ex-husband, Roberto, a sheriff's deputy. Bosch examines her case and finds that Roberto was shot twice in the back outside Lucinda's home following a custody dispute. The weapon was never recovered, and Roberto's "Que Viene el Cuco" tattoo associates him with the Cucos, a clique of deputies implicated in criminal activity.

Haller retrieves Lucinda's case file from her former attorney, Frank Silver, who admits little effort went into her defense. Lucinda maintains that Roberto left the house before she heard gunshots and called 911. Bosch notices a discrepancy in her police interview: Lucinda said a woman collected her gunshot residue sample, but records name only male deputy Keith Mitchell.

Haller and Bosch interview Lucinda's son, Eric, and her mother, Muriel Lopez. Eric recalls Roberto leaving him with his girlfriend, Matilda Landas, for a Sunday work meeting. The investigator Dennis "Cisco" Wojciechowski locates Landas, now known as Madison Landon. She says Roberto met an FBI agent named MacIsaac that day, Haller files a federal habeas petition.

Bosch interviews Angel Acosta, imprisoned for shooting at a deputy during the Flip's hamburger stand incident. He learns Silver represented Acosta too. Silver admits deputies threatened him into securing plea deals for both defendants. Acosta had disclosed that Roberto collected protection payments for the Cucos rather than participating in a genuine ambush.

Break-ins at Haller's office and Bosch's home appear intended to frighten them. Bosch later identifies Sergeant Stephanie Sanger as the woman who collected Lucinda's sample. Cellphone records place Roberto, an FBI agent, and Sanger near Flip's on the day of the killing. Sanger's phone disappears from the network during the period when Roberto died.

At Lucinda's federal hearing, expert Dr. Shami Arslanian presents a digital shooting reconstruction, but the judge excludes it because its artificial-intelligence software lacks approval. Maggie McPherson, Haller's ex-wife, questions Bosch's mental fitness. FBI Agent MacIsaac later confirms Roberto cooperated with the FBI against deputies controlled by the Sinaloa cartel.

Testing an original residue pad finds no DNA from Lucinda. A match links Sanger to the sample. Before Haller can question her, a cartel hit man kills Sanger at the courthouse. Judge Ellen Coelho vacates Lucinda's conviction and frees her.

Haller receives another night in jail for contempt. Reflecting on Lucinda's release and his own career, he abandons his former reliance on advertising and client acquisition. At sunrise, he walks through the prison door, beginning his own symbolic resurrection.

== Reception ==
Kirkus Reviews wrote that Connelly "never lets you forget, from his title onward, the life-or-death issues behind every move in the game" and called the novel the "most richly accomplished of the brothers' pairings to date—and given Connelly's high standards, that's saying a lot." Oline H. Cogdill of the Sun Sentinel wrote that the "superb" plot "maintains high suspense until the final page, a hallmark of this author's reputation", and that the novel "shows a renewal of the half-brothers' connection as Connelly brings a rich patina to the individual personalities of Haller and Bosch." Tom Nolan of The Wall Street Journal wrote that the novel is "enlivened by the presence of Haller's ex-wife" and that "Haller's legal savvy plays off Bosch's investigative skills, adding to the suspense and pleasures of this immensely satisfying book."
