= Lost Light =

2003 novel by Michael Connelly

- First edition
- Author: Michael Connelly
- Language: English
- Series: Harry Bosch
- Release number: 9
- Genre: Crime, mystery, thriller
- Publisher: Little, Brown and Company
- Publication date: April 1, 2003
- Publication place: United States
- Media type: Print (hardcover, paperback)
- Pages: 368
- ISBN: 0-316-15460-1
- OCLC: 50913555
- Dewey Decimal: 813/.54 21
- LC Class: PS3553.O51165 L67 2003
- Preceded by: City of Bones
- Followed by: The Narrows

Lost Light is a crime thriller novel, and the thirteenth novel by American author Michael Connelly, and the ninth featuring the Los Angeles detective Hieronymus "Harry" Bosch series.

The book was published on April 1, 2003, it is the first Bosch novel to be narrated in first person; all prior Bosch novels had utilized an omniscient third-person style.

== Plot ==
Harry Bosch has left the Los Angeles Police Department and now holds a private investigator's license. Four years earlier, Angella Benton, a production assistant at Eidolon, was found dead in her apartment building. Bosch had begun examining her death before the matter moved to Robbery-Homicide Division. Soon after Benton died, two million dollars vanished during a robbery at the film company's lot. Neither matter was solved.

Bosch takes Benton's file from his former police office and begins asking former colleagues and acquaintances what they remember. He meets Kiz Rider, Lawton Cross, and others who knew about Benton's death. Cross's partner, John Dorsey, was killed during a robbery, while Cross later retired. Bosch also meets people tied to the film company, including Alexander Taylor, who remembers Benton.

The missing money becomes important again when federal agents believe some of the cash may have reached an overseas extremist group. Roy Lindell, now with the FBI, becomes part of the dispute. Bosch refuses to abandon Benton's case as federal priorities shift. He follows the money through BankLA and meets Gordon Scaggs, Linus Simonson, Jocelyn Jones, and others familiar with its records.

Bosch learns that Angella had possessed material tied to the missing cash and that several people had reasons to keep quiet. Janis Langwiser assists Bosch when legal matters arise, while Keisha Russell follows the case for the Los Angeles Times. Sandor Szatmari, an insurance investigator, also has records tied to the robbery. Bosch compares names, payments, vehicles, and meetings with old police reports.

His inquiries bring him to people who had been overlooked years earlier. Ken Nunez and other federal members that remain interested in the money for reasons separate from Benton's death. Burnett Biggar, a retired LAPD detective, helps Bosch through his security company. Gordon Scaggs and BankLA remain important as Bosch traces how the cash moved after the robbery.

Eleanor Wish, Bosch's former wife, reappears in his life. She now lives in Las Vegas and earns her living as a professional poker gambler. Their conversations revive old feelings as Bosch continues looking for answers about Angella. Their daughter Maddie becomes an important part of Bosch's personal life, giving him another future to consider.

Bosch encounters people who benefited from the robbery. Some do not want him asking questions, while federal pressure makes his position harder. He refuses offers to walk away, visiting witnesses and examining records. His inquiries point toward those responsible for the robbery and Benton's death, while the missing money gives him a path toward the killer.

Bosch identifies the person responsible for Benton's death and the robbery, but the answer carries a private cost. His home is attacked, forcing him to consider whether his search has placed Maddie and Eleanor at risk. Afterward, Bosch remains committed to Benton's memory. His renewed bond with Eleanor and the news that they have a daughter give his life a new direction.

== Soundtrack ==
Lost Light is distinguished by the inclusion of a soundtrack CD, Dark Sacred Night, the Music of Harry Bosch, to accompany the first hardback edition. The CD features jazz music that Harry Bosch would have been listening to, including that of Art Pepper, Sonny Rollins and John Coltrane.
