= Michael Connelly =

American author (born 1956)

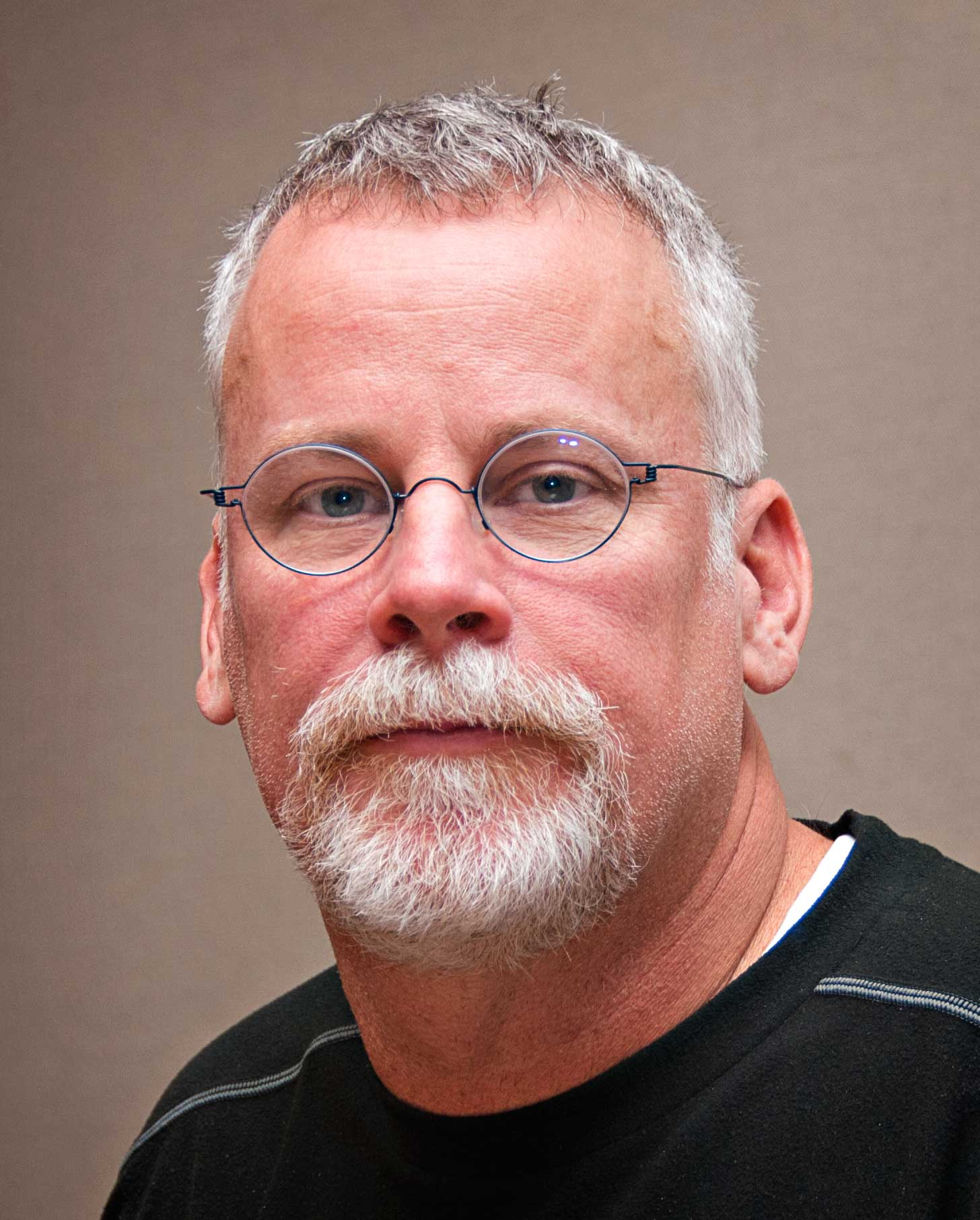
- Connelly at the detective fiction convention Bouchercon XLI in San Francisco, October 2010
- Born: July 21, 1956 (age 70); Philadelphia, Pennsylvania, U.S.
- Education: St. Thomas Aquinas High School
- Alma mater: University of Florida
- Occupation: Novelist
- Spouse: Linda McCaleb (m. 1984)
- Children: 1
- Writing career
- Genres: Crime fiction, thriller
- Website: michaelconnelly.com

Michael Joseph Connelly (born July 21, 1956) is an American author of detective novels and other crime fiction, notably those featuring LAPD Detective Hieronymus "Harry" Bosch and criminal defense attorney Mickey Haller, including 10 (as of 2025) with both those characters. Connelly is the bestselling author of 42 novels and one work of non-fiction (as of May 2026), with over 74 million copies of his books sold worldwide and translated into 40 languages. His first novel, The Black Echo, won the Mystery Writers of America Edgar Award for Best First Novel in 1992. In 2002, Clint Eastwood directed and starred in the movie adaptation of Connelly's 1997 novel, Blood Work. In March 2011, the movie adaptation of Connelly's novel The Lincoln Lawyer starred Matthew McConaughey as Mickey Haller. Connelly was the president of the Mystery Writers of America from 2003 to 2004.

== Early life ==
Connelly was born in Philadelphia, Pennsylvania, the second eldest child of W. Michael Connelly, a property developer, and Mary Connelly, a homemaker. He is of Irish ancestry. According to Connelly, his father was a frustrated artist who encouraged his children to want to succeed in life and was a risk taker who alternated between success and failure in his pursuit of a career. Connelly's mother was a fan of crime fiction and introduced her son to the world of mystery novels.

At age 12, Connelly moved with his family from Philadelphia to Fort Lauderdale, Florida, where he attended St. Thomas Aquinas High School. At age 16, Connelly's interest in crime and mystery escalated when, on his way home from his work as a hotel dishwasher, he witnessed a man throw an object into a hedge. Connelly decided to investigate and found that the object was a gun wrapped in a lumberjack shirt. After putting the gun back he followed the man to a bar and then left to go home to tell his father. Later that night Connelly brought the police down to the bar but the man was already gone. This event introduced Connelly to the world of police officers and their lives, impressing him with the way they worked.

Connelly had planned on following his father's early choice of career in building construction and started out at the University of Florida in Gainesville, at the Rinker School of Building Construction, studying construction management. After earning grades that were lower than expected, Connelly went to see Robert Altman's film The Long Goodbye (1973). The film, based on Raymond Chandler's eponymous 1953 novel, inspired Connelly to want to become a mystery writer. Connelly went home and read all of Chandler's works featuring Philip Marlowe and decided to transfer to the University of Florida College of Journalism and Communications, major in journalism and minor in creative writing.

== Early career ==
After graduating from the University of Florida in 1980, Connelly got a job as a crime beat writer at the Daytona Beach News-Journal, where he worked for almost two years until he went to the Fort Lauderdale News and Sun-Sentinel in 1981. There, he covered the crime beat during the South Florida cocaine wars. He stayed with the paper for a few years, and in 1986 he and two other reporters spent several months interviewing survivors of the 1985 Delta Flight 191 plane crash, which story earned Connelly a place as a finalist for the Pulitzer Prize. The honor also brought Connelly a job as a crime reporter at the Los Angeles Times. He moved to California in 1987 with his wife, Linda McCaleb, whom he had met while in college and married in April 1984.

After moving to Los Angeles, Connelly went to see High Tower Court where Raymond Chandler's character Philip Marlowe had lived (in his 1942 novel The High Window), and Robert Altman had used for his film The Long Goodbye (1973). Connelly got the manager of the building to promise to phone him if the apartment ever became available. Ten years later the manager tracked Connelly down and Connelly decided to rent the place. This apartment served as a place to write for several years.

After three years at the Los Angeles Times Connelly wrote his first published novel, The Black Echo (1992), after previously writing two unfinished novels that he did not attempt to get published. He sold The Black Echo to Little, Brown to be published in 1992 and won the Mystery Writers of America's Edgar Award for Best first Novel. The book is partly based on a true crime and is the first one featuring Connelly's primary recurring character, Los Angeles Police Department Detective Hieronymus "Harry" Bosch, a man who, according to Connelly, shares few similarities with the author himself. Connelly named Bosch after the Dutch painter Hieronymus Bosch, known for his paintings full of sin and redemption, such as the painting Hell, a copy of which hangs on the office wall behind Connelly's computer. Connelly describes his own work as a big canvas with all the characters of his books floating across it as currents on a painting. Sometimes they are bound to collide, creating cross currents. This is something that Connelly creates by bringing back characters from previous books and letting them play a part in books written five or six years after first being introduced.

Connelly went on to write three more novels about Detective Bosch—The Black Ice (1993), The Concrete Blonde (1994) and The Last Coyote (1995)—before quitting his job as a reporter to write full time.

== Full-time novelist ==
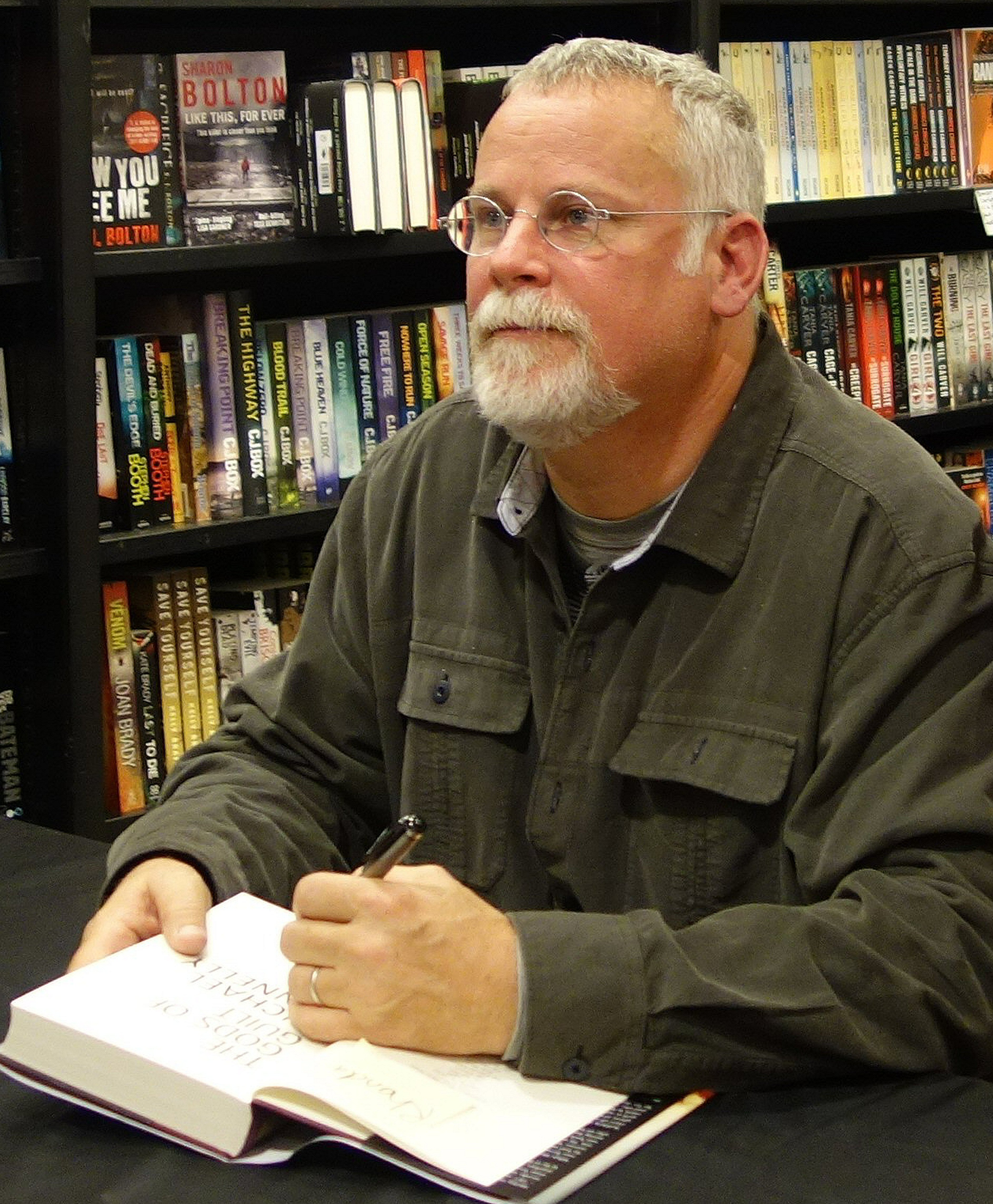
Michael Connelly, London November 2013

Connelly received a good deal of publicity in 1994 when President Bill Clinton came out of a bookstore carrying a copy of The Concrete Blonde in front of the waiting cameras. A meeting was set up between the two at Los Angeles International Airport.

In 1996, Connelly wrote The Poet, his first book not to feature Bosch. Instead the protagonist was reporter Jack McEvoy. The book was a success. In 1997, Connelly returned to Bosch in Trunk Music before writing another book, Blood Work (1997), about a different character, FBI agent Terry McCaleb. Blood Work was made into a film in 2002, directed by Clint Eastwood, who also played McCaleb, an agent with a transplanted heart in pursuit of his donor's murderer. The book came together after one of Connelly's friends had a heart transplant and he saw what his friend was going through with survivor's guilt after the surgery. When asked if he had anything against the changes made to fit the big screen, Connelly simply replied: "If you take their money, it's their turn to tell the story."

Connelly wrote another book featuring Bosch, Angels Flight (1999), before writing Void Moon (2000), a free-standing book about Las Vegas thief Cassie Black. In 2001, A Darkness More Than Night was published, in which Connelly united Bosch and McCaleb to solve a crime together, before releasing two books in 2002. The first, City of Bones, was the eighth Bosch novel, and the other, Chasing the Dime, was a non-series novel. In 2001, Connelly left California for Tampa Bay, Florida, together with his wife and daughter, so that both he and his wife could be closer to their families. His novels still took place in Los Angeles.

In 2003, another Bosch novel, Lost Light, was published. With this book, a CD was released, Dark Sacred Night, the Music of Harry Bosch, featuring some of the jazz music that both Connelly and the fictional character Bosch listen to. While writing Connelly listens exclusively to instrumental jazz, though, because it does not have intrusive vocals and because the improvisational playing inspires his writing. The Narrows, published in 2004, was a sequel to The Poet but featured Bosch instead of McEvoy. Together with this book, a DVD was released called Blue Neon Night: Michael Connelly's Los Angeles, in which film Connelly presents some of the places in Los Angeles that are frequently featured in his books.

The Closers, published in May 2005, was the 11th Bosch novel. It was followed by The Lincoln Lawyer in October, Connelly's first legal novel; it features defense attorney Mickey Haller, Bosch's half-brother. The book was made into a film in 2011, starring Matthew McConaughey as Haller. After releasing Crime Beat (2004), a non-fiction book about Connelly's experiences as a crime reporter, Connelly went back to Bosch with Echo Park (2006). This book sets its opening scene in the High Tower Apartment that Connelly rented and wrote from. His next Bosch story, The Overlook, was originally published as a multi-part series in the New York Times Magazine. After some editing, it was published as a novel in 2007. In October 2008, Connelly wrote The Brass Verdict, which brought together Bosch and Haller for the first time. He followed that with The Scarecrow (May 2009), which brought back McEvoy as the lead character. 9 Dragons, a novel taking Bosch to Hong Kong, was published in October 2009. The Reversal (October 2010), reunites Bosch and Haller as they work together under the banner of the state on the retrial of a child murderer. The Haller novel The Fifth Witness was published in 2011.

The Drop, which refers in part to the "Deferred Retirement Option Plan" that was described in the novel The Brass Verdict (2008), was published in November 2011. The next Bosch novel was The Black Box (2012). Connelly's subsequent novel, a legal thriller, was a return to Haller: The Gods of Guilt (2013). His next book returned to Bosch in The Burning Room (2014), and then Connelly used Haller as a main supporting character in the Bosch novels The Crossing (2015) and The Wrong Side of Goodbye (2016).

In 2017, Connelly's first novel featuring Detective Renée Ballard, The Late Show, was published. Like Bosch, she works in Hollywood, but on the night shift. Ballard and Bosch appeared together in five subsequent novels: Dark Sacred Night (2018), The Night Fire (2019), The Dark Hours (2021), Desert Star (2022) and The Waiting (2024).

== Film and television ==
- Connelly was one of the creators and executive producers of Level 9, an action TV series that aired for 13 episodes in the 2000–2001 season on the UPN television network.
- His novel Blood Work was adapted into a 2002 film with a screenplay by Brian Helgeland and direction by Clint Eastwood, who also played the lead role.
- Connelly is the subject of the video documentary Blue Neon Night: Michael Connelly's Los Angeles (2004).
- He occasionally made guest appearances as himself in the ABC comedy/drama TV series Castle. Along with fellow crime authors James Patterson, Dennis Lehane, and Stephen J. Cannell, he was one of Castle's poker buddies.
- Connelly's novel The Lincoln Lawyer was made into a film in 2011, with Matthew McConaughey playing defense lawyer Michael "Mickey" Haller.
- In 2022, A&E Studios developed Connelly's second novel in The Lincoln Lawyer series, The Brass Verdict, into a 10-episode series simply titled The Lincoln Lawyer (TV series). The series was cancelled by CBS and picked up by Netflix. The series was positively received by critics and audiences, reaching #2 on the most viewed series on Netflix in its first three days. A second season based on The Fifth Witness was released in 2023, and a third season based on The Gods of Guilt was released in 2024. A fourth season based on The Law of Innocence was released in February 2026, and it has been renewed for a fifth season to be based on Resurrection Walk.
- Connelly is the executive producer of Sound of Redemption: The Frank Morgan Story, a documentary about jazz saxophonist Frank Morgan.
- Connelly produced a TV series for Amazon Studios called Bosch, based on Connelly's Harry Bosch novels. It began streaming on Amazon Prime in early 2014, and ran for seven seasons on Amazon, concluding in 2021. A spin-off called Bosch: Legacy, also produced by Connelly, began streaming on Amazon Freevee in 2022. It ended in April 2025, after three seasons.
- Connelly's short story Avalon is being adapted into a television series by David E. Kelley and Connelly for ABC.
- In 2024, Connelly hosted and wrote The Wonderland Massacre & The Secret History of Hollywood, a documentary series for MGM+ that adapted his 2021 true crime podcast about the Wonderland murders.
- In 2025, Ballard premiered on Prime Video starring Maggie Q as Renée Ballard, leading a team of volunteers on the LAPD cold case unit. Season 1 was based on Desert Star with elements from The Late Show and The Dark Hours. The series was renewed for a second season in October 2025.

== Awards and honors ==
Connelly has won nearly every major award given to mystery writers, including the Edgar Award, Anthony Award, Macavity Award, Los Angeles Times Best Mystery/Thriller Award, Shamus Award, Dilys Award, Nero Award, Barry Award, Audie Award, Ridley Award, Maltese Falcon Award (Japan), .38 Caliber Award (France), the Grand Prix de Littérature Policière (France) and Premio Bancarella Award (Italy). In 2012, The Black Box won the world's most lucrative crime fiction award, the RBA Prize for Crime Writing worth €125,000. He received the Cartier Diamond Dagger in 2018 from the Crime Writers' Association.

== Writing techniques ==
When starting a book, he says, the story is not always clear, but Connelly has “a hunch” as to where it is going. The books often reference real-world events, such as the 1992 Los Angeles riots and the September 11 attacks. Events that might seem of minor significance are included in some of the books, because of Connelly's personal interest in them. For example, City of Bones, in which Detective Bosch investigates the murder of an 11-year-old boy, was written during Connelly's early years as a father of a daughter, and it hit close to home. According to Connelly, he didn't mean to write about the biggest fear of his life; it just came out that way. David Geherin states that Connelly "deliberately avoids ornate language, the kind that makes the reader stop and savor the choice of words or elegant phrasing. He doesn't want anything to inhibit the forward momentum he is working to create."

Detective Bosch's life usually changes in harmony with Connelly's own life. When Connelly moved 3,000 miles across the country, Bosch's experiences sent him in a new direction in City of Bones, written at that time. According to Connelly, his "real" job is to write about Bosch, and he brought McCaleb and Bosch together in A Darkness More Than Night in order to look at Bosch from another perspective and to keep the character interesting.

Connelly often changes perspectives between characters in his novels. In Void Moon, Connelly frequently alternates between following protagonist Cassie Black and antagonist Jack Karch. In Fair Warning, Connelly outright changes the overarching perspective of the book on occasion, regularly following protagonist Jack McEvoy in a first-person point of view while occasionally branching away from his story to follow the antagonists in third-person.

== Recurring characters ==
Every character in the list below, with one exception, has appeared in a Harry Bosch book. All of Connelly's novels occur in the same fictional universe and character crossovers are common.

=== Main characters ===
- Hieronymus "Harry" Bosch – a Los Angeles Police Department detective.
- Michael "Mickey" Haller – a Los Angeles criminal defense attorney and Bosch's half-brother.
- Terrell "Terry" McCaleb – criminal profiler for the Federal Bureau of Investigation assigned to Los Angeles. While tracking down "The Code Killer", McCaleb needed a heart transplant. While recovering from his surgery, McCaleb is contacted by Graciela Rivers, the sister of the woman whose heart was implanted in his body. She asks him to investigate her sister's murder. A movie based on the novel and starring Clint Eastwood was released in 2002.
- Jack McEvoy – crime reporter, brother of one of the Poet's victims.
- Rachel Walling – FBI agent.
- Cassidy "Cassie" Black – burglar and ex-con. Lead character in Void Moon. Has a cameo in The Narrows. She is described by Mickey Haller in The Brass Verdict as a client by way of her unique modus operandi.
- Henry Pierce – Chemical scientist and entrepreneur. Lead character in Chasing the Dime. Pierce is the only Connelly character who has never appeared in a Harry Bosch novel (in fact he has not appeared in any other Connelly novel). However, Bosch was referred to by a character in Chasing the Dime, although not by name.
- Renée Ballard – a Los Angeles Police Department detective.
- Madeline "Maddie" Bosch – daughter of Harry Bosch and Eleanor Wish; Mickey Haller's niece, Los Angeles Police Department officer.
- Stilwell – Los Angeles County Sheriff's Detective Sergeant

=== Other characters ===
Each of these characters has appeared in at least two of Connelly's novels.

- Lieutenant Grace "Bullets" Billets – Harvey Pounds' successor as Bosch's supervisor in Hollywood Homicide squad. When first introduced, she had a husband, but was in a same-sex relationship with Kiz Rider.
- Joel Bremmer - Keisha Russell's predecessor on the LA Times crime beat. In The Concrete Blonde, it is established that Bremmer wrote a novel about a string of murders committed by a serial killer known as "The Dollmaker." Bremmer used this pattern as a cover to commit several murders of his own.
- Earl Briggs – Haller's regular driver until The Gods of Guilt, when he is killed in a car crash.
- Elizabeth Clayton – a drug addict who helps Bosch in Two Kinds of Truth; in return he tries to help find the murderer of Elizabeth's daughter Daisy. Elizabeth commits suicide in Dark Sacred Night.
- John Chastain – former LAPD Internal Affairs detective, killed during the events of Angels Flight.
- David Chu – Bosch's partner in RHD Special Homicide. Was with LAPD's Asian Gangs Unit (AGU) during the events of 9 Dragons.
- Teresa Corazon – Bosch's love interest in The Black Ice, appears later in City of Bones and A Darkness More than Night; medical expert examiner.
- Jerry "Jed" Edgar (aka J. Edgar) – Bosch's former partner in Hollywood Homicide squad; appears in Two Kinds of Truth as a member of the Medical Board of California.
- Ignacio "Iggy" Ferras – Bosch's former partner in the RHD Homicide Special Unit, killed during the events of 9 Dragons.
- Hayley Haller – Daughter of Mickey Haller and Maggie McPherson; Harry Bosch's niece.
- Aaron Hayes – A lifeguard at the beach Ballard often surfs or sleeps at. He has a casual sexual relationship with Ballard.
- Carmen Hinojos – LAPD psychologist; first appears in The Last Coyote, Bosch later contacts her upon returning from Hong Kong to help Maddie cope with the events of 9 Dragons.
- Irvin S. Irving – former LAPD Deputy Chief and Bosch's chief nemesis in the department, later an L.A. city councilman.
- John Iverson - Las Vegas Metropolitan Police Detective in Trunk Music, appears later in Void Moon.
- Thelma Kibble – Cassie Black's parole officer.
- Howard Kurlen – detective in Van Nuys Division and frequent opponent of Haller's on the stand
- Janis Langwiser – former prosecutor, now a criminal defense attorney.
- Raul Levin – Mickey Haller's private investigator in The Lincoln Lawyer. Killed during the events.
- Roy Lindell (aka "Luke Goshen") – FBI agent who first appears in Trunk Music.
- Buddy Lockridge – McCaleb's friend and business associate.
- Lola – Ballard's dog, a rescue, appears in every book Ballard appears in.
- Bella Lourdes – Bosch's partner at the San Fernando Police Department; appears in The Wrong Side of Goodbye and assists Bosch and Ballard in Dark Sacred Night.
- Oscar Luzon – A colleague of Bosch's at the San Fernando Police Department; appears in Two Kinds of Truth. In Dark Sacred Night Luzon is discovered to have tipped off gangster friends about an investigation, and attempts to commit suicide while being detained, resulting in Bosch's dismissal from the department.
- Maggie "McFierce" McPherson – A prosecutor in the Van Nuys Division, Haller's first ex-wife.
- Robert Olivas – Lieutenant of RHD in The Late Show who sexually harassed Ballard. Her complaint resulted in her transfer to the Late Show when no one backed her up. Has been promoted to Captain by the time of The Night Fire.
- Lucius Porter – Hollywood Homicide Detective (The Black Echo and The Black Ice).
- Harvey "Ninety-Eight" Pounds – Bosch's ex-supervisor in Hollywood Homicide squad, murdered in The Last Coyote.
- Abel Pratt – LAPD Open-Unsolved Unit supervisor.
- Kizmin "Kiz" Rider – Bosch's former partner in Hollywood Homicide squad and the RHD Open-Unsolved Unit; now an aide to the L.A. chief of police. When introduced, she was in a same-sex relationship with her commanding officer, Lt. Grace Billets.
- Graciela Rivers-McCaleb. Terry McCaleb meets Graciela and her nephew Raymond at the beginning of Blood Work. In A Darkness More Than Night Terry and Graciela are married and living on Catalina Island, and they have a young daughter and have adopted Raymond. In The Narrows she moves back to the mainland with the children.
- Keisha Russell – Los Angeles Times reporter, started on the Los Angeles crime beat, Now based in D.C., and occasionally provided information for Bosch. Jack McEvoy's ex-wife.
- Larry Sakai – Coroner technician with the LAPD.
- Francis "Frankie" Sheehan – Bosch's original partner in Robbery-Homicide Division.
- Lucia "Lucky" Soto – Bosch's partner in The Burning Room. Assists Ballard in Dark Sacred Night.
- Lorna Taylor – Mickey Haller's current secretary and second ex-wife.
- Ed Thomas – Hollywood Homicide Detective (mentioned in The Poet, appears later in The Narrows).
- Steven Vascik – A process server in Angels Flight, based on a real-life acquaintance of the author. Vascik is credited with photos of Hong Kong on the author's website (photo gallery 15–17).
- Jaye Winston – Detective with the Los Angeles County Sheriff's Department, works alongside both Bosch and McCaleb in Blood Work and A Darkness More Than Night.
- Eleanor Wish – ex-FBI agent, ex-con and Bosch's ex-wife, mother of Bosch's daughter Maddie; moved to Hong Kong. Killed during the events of 9 Dragons.
- Dennis "Cisco" Wojciechowski – Mickey Haller's private investigator. Formerly associated with the Road Saints motorcycle gang who bestowed the nickname Cisco on him in reference to The Cisco Kid. (Wojciechowski is named after Connelly's real-life investigator, who, like Bosch, is a Vietnam veteran.)

== Published works ==
=== Novels ===
==== Author ====
Title	Book number	Publication date	Featuring	Also featuring
The Black Echo	1	1992	Harry Bosch (1)	Eleanor Wish
The Black Ice	2	1993	Harry Bosch (2)	
The Concrete Blonde	3	1994	Harry Bosch (3)	
The Last Coyote	4	1995	Harry Bosch (4)	
The Poet	5	1996	Jack McEvoy (1)	Rachel Walling
Trunk Music	6	1997	Harry Bosch (5)	Eleanor Wish, Roy Lindell
Blood Work	7	1998	Terry McCaleb (1)	Jaye Winston
Angels Flight	8	1999	Harry Bosch (6)	Eleanor Wish, Roy Lindell
Void Moon	9	1999	Cassie Black (1)	
A Darkness More Than Night	10	2000	Terry McCaleb (2), Harry Bosch (7)	Jaye Winston, Jack McEvoy
City of Bones	11	2002	Harry Bosch (8)	
Chasing the Dime	12	2002	Henry Pierce (1)	
Lost Light	13	2003	Harry Bosch (9)	Eleanor Wish, Roy Lindell
The Narrows	14	2004	Harry Bosch (10)	Rachel Walling, Eleanor Wish
The Closers	15	2005	Harry Bosch (11)	Kiz Rider
The Lincoln Lawyer	16	2005	Mickey Haller (1)	Maggie McPherson
Echo Park	17	2006	Harry Bosch (12)	Rachel Walling
The Overlook	18	2007	Harry Bosch (13)	Rachel Walling
The Brass Verdict	19	2008	Mickey Haller (2)	Harry Bosch, Jack McEvoy
The Scarecrow	20	2009	Jack McEvoy (2)	Rachel Walling
Nine Dragons	21	2009	Harry Bosch (14)	Eleanor Wish, Mickey Haller, David Chu
The Reversal	22	2010	Mickey Haller (3)	Harry Bosch, Maggie McPherson, Rachel Walling
The Fifth Witness	23	2011	Mickey Haller (4)	Maggie McPherson
The Drop	24	2011	Harry Bosch (15)	David Chu, Kiz Rider, Dr Hannah Stone
The Black Box	25	2012	Harry Bosch (16)	David Chu, Dr Hannah Stone
The Gods of Guilt	26	2013	Mickey Haller (5)	
The Burning Room	27	2014	Harry Bosch (17)	Rachel Walling, Lucia Soto
The Crossing	28	2015	Harry Bosch (18)	Mickey Haller, Lucia Soto
The Wrong Side of Goodbye	29	2016	Harry Bosch (19)	Mickey Haller
The Late Show	30	2017	Renee Ballard (1)	
Two Kinds of Truth	31	2017	Harry Bosch (20)	Mickey Haller
Dark Sacred Night	32	2018	Renee Ballard (2), Harry Bosch (21)	
The Night Fire	33	2019	Renee Ballard (3), Harry Bosch (22)	Mickey Haller
Fair Warning	34	2020	Jack McEvoy (3)	Rachel Walling
The Law of Innocence	35	2020	Mickey Haller (6)	Harry Bosch
The Dark Hours	36	2021	Renee Ballard (4), Harry Bosch (23)	
Desert Star	37	2022	Renee Ballard (5), Harry Bosch (24)	
Resurrection Walk	38	2023	Mickey Haller (7)	Harry Bosch
The Waiting	39	2024	Renee Ballard (6), Harry Bosch (25)	Maddie Bosch
Nightshade	40	2025	Stilwell (1)	
The Proving Ground	41	2025	Mickey Haller (8)	Jack McEvoy
Ironwood	42	2026	Stilwell (2)	Renee Ballard
The Hollow	43	2026	Harry Bosch (26)	Mickey Haller, Renee Ballard
Daybreak (upcoming)	44	2027	Stilwell (3)	

Novel collections:

- The Harry Bosch Novels, Volume 1 (2001), includes "The Black Echo", "The Black Ice" and "The Concrete Blonde"
- The Harry Bosch Novels, Volume 2 (2003), includes "The Last Coyote", "Trunk Music" and "Angels Flight"
- The Harry Bosch Novels, Volume 3 (2010), includes "A Darkness More Than Night", "City of Bones" and "Lost Light"

==== Editor ====
- The Best American Mystery Stories 2003 (2003) – collected short stories
- Murder in Vegas (2005) – collected short stories
- The Blue Religion (2008) – collected short stories
- In the Shadow of the Master (2009) – collected short stories by Edgar Allan Poe, with observations by current mystery writers including Sue Grafton and Stephen King

=== Short stories ===
Harry Bosch series:

- Collections:
  - Angle of Investigation (2011), collection of 3 short stories:
    "Christmas Even", "Father's Day", "Angle of Investigation"
  - Suicide Run (2011), collection of 3 short stories:
    "Suicide Run", "Cielo Azul", "One Dollar Jackpot"
  - Mulholland Dive (2012), collection of 3 short stories:
    "Cahoots", "Mulholland Dive", "Two-Bagger"
- Uncollected short stories:
  - "Blue on Black", in Hook, Line & Sinister (2010); with Rachel Walling
  - "Blood Washes Off", in The Rich and the Dead (2011)
  - "Homicide Special", in The Drop (2011); written exclusively for copies of The Drop sold in Waterstones stores
  - "A Fine Mist of Blood", in Vengeance (2012)
  - "Switchblade" – an ebook companion to The Gods of Guilt, published on 14 January 2014
  - "Red Eye", in "FaceOff" (2014), co-written with Dennis Lehane; with Patrick Kenzie
  - "The Crooked Man", in "In the Company of Sherlock Holmes: Stories Inspired by the Holmes Canon" (Nov 2014)
  - "Nighthawks", in "In Sunlight or In Shadow: Stories Inspired by the Paintings of Edward Hopper" (Dec 2016)
  - "The Guardian", in "Tampa Bay Noir" (Aug 2020)
- All short stories:
  - "Two-Bagger", in Murderers' Row (2001) and The Best American Mystery Stories 2002 (2002)
  - "Cahoots", in Measures of Poison (2002)
  - "Christmas Even", in Murder...and All That Jazz (2004), partner: Jerry Edgar
  - "Cielo Azul", in Dangerous Women (2005); backstory to A Darkness More than Night
  - "Angle of Investigation", in Plots with Guns (2005) and The Penguin Book Of Crime Stories (2007) – continuation of The Closers; partner: Kiz Rider
  - "Mulholland Dive", in Los Angeles Noir (2007), Prisoner of Memory (2008), The Best American Mystery Stories (2008), and A Prisoner of Memory and 24 of the Year's Finest Crime and Mystery Stories (2008)
  - "Suicide Run", in Hollywood and Crime (2007)
  - "One Dollar Jackpot", in Dead Man's Hand (2007)
  - "Father's Day", in The Blue Religion (2008), and The Best American Mystery Stories (2009); partner: Ignacio Ferras
  - "Blue on Black", in Hook, Line & Sinister (2010); with Rachel Walling
  - "Blood Washes Off", in The Rich and the Dead (2011)
  - "Homicide Special", in The Drop (2011); written exclusively for copies of The Drop sold in Waterstones stores
  - "A Fine Mist of Blood", in Vengeance (2012)
  - "Switchblade" – an ebook companion to The Gods of Guilt, published on 14 January 2014
  - "Red Eye", in "FaceOff" (2014), co-written with Dennis Lehane; with Patrick Kenzie
  - "The Crooked Man", in "In the Company of Sherlock Holmes: Stories Inspired by the Holmes Canon" (Nov 2014)
  - "Nighthawks", in "In Sunlight or In Shadow: Stories Inspired by the Paintings of Edward Hopper" (Dec 2016)
  - "The Guardian", in "Tampa Bay Noir" (Aug 2020)

Mickey Haller series:

- "The Perfect Triangle", in The Dark End of the Street (2010)
- "Burnt Matches", in "The Highway Kind: Tales of Fast Cars, Desperate Drives and Dark Roads" (Oct 2016)

Stand-alones:

- "After Midnight", in Men from Boys (2003)
- "The Safe Man", published anonymously in The Secret Society Of Demolition Writers (2005)
- "The Third Panel", in "Alive In Shape And Color" (Dec 2017)
- "Avalon", in "When a Stranger Comes to Town" (Apr 2021)

=== Children's short stories ===
- "Short Cut", published in Half-Minute Horrors (2009), for kids ages 9–12

=== Non-fiction ===
- Crime Beat (2004), collected journalism from the Sun-Sentinel and Los Angeles Times

== Filmography ==
=== Television ===
- Level 9 (2001) – co-creator and co-executive producer
- Castle (2009–2011) – actor (cameo)
- Bosch (2015–2021) – co-creator, writer and executive producer
- The Lincoln Lawyer (2022–present) – writer and executive producer
- Bosch: Legacy (2022–2025) – co-developer, writer and executive producer
- Ballard (2025–present) – executive producer
- Bosch: Start of Watch (TBA) – executive producer

=== Features ===
- Sound of Redemption: The Frank Morgan Story (2014) – executive producer

== Adaptations ==
- Blood Work (2002), film directed by Clint Eastwood, based on novel Blood Work
- The Lincoln Lawyer (2011), film directed by Brad Furman, based on novel The Lincoln Lawyer
- Bosch (2014–2021), series developed by Eric Overmyer, based on novel series Harry Bosch
- Bosch: Legacy (2022–2025), series developed by Michael Connelly, Tom Bernardo and Eric Overmyer, based on novel series Harry Bosch
- The Lincoln Lawyer (2022–present), series created by David E. Kelley, based on novel series Mickey Haller
- Ballard (2025–present), series developed by Michael Alaimo and Kendall Sherwood, based on novel series Renée Ballard
- Bosch: Start of Watch (TBA), a prequel series focusing on a young Bosch
