= Angels Flight (novel) =

1999 novel by Michael Connelly

- Hardcover edition
- Author: Michael Connelly
- Language: English
- Series: Harry Bosch
- Release number: 6
- Genre: Crime, mystery, thriller
- Publisher: Little, Brown and Company
- Publication date: January 28, 1999
- Publication place: United States
- Media type: Print (hardcover, paperback)
- Pages: 393
- ISBN: 978-0-316-15219-8
- OCLC: 39275880
- Dewey Decimal: 813/.54 21
- LC Class: PS3553.O51165 A8 1999
- Preceded by: Trunk Music
- Followed by: A Darkness More Than Night

Angels Flight is a crime thriller novel, and the eighth novel by American author Michael Connelly, and the sixth featuring the Los Angeles detective Hieronymus "Harry" Bosch.

It was first published in January 28, 1999, and won the CWA's 1999 Gold Dagger, but lost to Robert Wilson's A Small Death in Lisbon..

== Plot ==
LAPD detective Harry Bosch is assigned to investigate the murder of prominent attorney Howard Elias on Angels Flight, a funicular railway in downtown Los Angeles. Elias was found shot to death along with a woman, Catalina Perez. The detectives from Robbery-Homicide Division (RHD) who were initially assigned to the case conclude that Perez was an innocent bystander and that Elias was the target. Elias was known for representing minority plaintiffs in civil suits against the LAPD and had a bad reputation within the department. Due to the accuracy of the gunshots used in the crime, Bosch realizes that his fellow police officers are the most likely suspects.

Deputy Chief of Police Irvin Irving is forced to remove RHD because many of its detectives are defendants in a case Elias was bringing to federal court. Elias was representing Michael Harris, who was recently acquitted of the murder of Stacey Kincaid, the young stepdaughter of local car dealer Sam Kincaid. Harris claims that the fingerprint evidence against him was planted, and that RHD detectives had tortured him to obtain a confession. Irving and Bosch are aware that Elias' death could inflame racial tensions and result in a repeat of the 1992 riots, especially if his killer was found to be a police officer. Bosch suspects that he is being set up to fail by Irving after one of his rivals, internal affairs detective John Chastain, is assigned to help him work the case.

Bosch and Chastain enter Elias' apartment without a search warrant and find evidence that he was having an affair with LAPD Inspector-General Carla Entrenkin, but the evidence is missing by the time they return with a warrant. Bosch is instructed to halt his search of Elias' office by the district attorney, who informs him that Entrenkin is to be appointed special master to protect attorney-client privilege on his ongoing cases. Bosch confronts Entrenkin, who confesses that she loved Elias and broke into his apartment after being informed of his death.

Entrenkin reveals that Elias was planning to identify Stacey Kincaid's true killer in court. They find anonymous letters that had apparently tipped off Elias about Harris' innocence. Bosch meets with his former partner, Detective Frankie Sheehan, who admits that he tortured Harris but insists that he did not plant the fingerprint evidence. Bosch talks to Elias' private investigator, who reveals that Kincaid's mother, Kate, had her car detailed at Harris' workplace, explaining the fingerprint evidence. Bosch also finds two homeless men who report that Kincaid's body was moved to the location where it was found after Harris had already been taken into custody. Bosch now knows that Harris is innocent.

Bosch's partner, Detective Kizmin Rider, figures out the anonymous letters reveal how to gain access to a secret child pornography website showing photos of Kincaid being sexually abused for years before her murder. Rider believes that Stacey's stepfather is the man in the pictures; when Elias accessed this website, he set off a warning system to its administrators, possibly precipitating his murder. Bosch theorizes that Kate sent the anonymous tip to Elias, knowing that it would reveal her husband's guilt. After learning that Sheehan's wife has left him, Bosch invites the detective to stay at his house.

Kate confirms to Bosch that Sam is a pedophile and killed her daughter. Bosch takes a phone call from an FBI agent who is executing a warrant on the Kincaids' house. Sam and his security guard, who assisted in Stacey's murder, are found after having been shot to death by Kate. As Bosch is learning of this development on the phone, Kate kills herself in front of him with the same gun. He returns home to find Sheehan dead, apparently having also committed suicide. Ballistics match Sheehan's gun to the weapons used to kill Elias and Perez, and the LAPD brass announce that the case is closed. Entrenkin announces that she will resign and take over Elias' practice, representing Harris. Riots break out in South Central Los Angeles.

Entrenkin informs Bosch that he missed a vital clue in Elias' files. He finds that Chastain was set to be called as a witness by Elias during the Harris trial, and that he had secretly sold information to Elias on previous cases. He also learns that Chastain found evidence proving that Harris was tortured but was convinced to keep quiet by Irving. The detectives realize that Elias planned to expose Chastain's cover-up at trial, ruining his career while revealing him as a snitch. Bosch further finds that Chastain substituted rounds fired by Sheehan in a legal shooting some years earlier for the slugs found in Elias and Perez's bodies to frame Sheehan. He determines that Chastain killed Sheehan and made it look like a suicide.

Bosch drives into South Central Los Angeles to arrest Chastain, who has been deployed there to help control the riots. En route back to Parker Center, Bosch accidentally drives into a riot zone. Bosch drives into a police barricade but realizes that Chastain has been pulled from the backseat and is being beaten by the mob; he dies before backup arrives. Bosch reflects that Chastain will be made out as a martyr by Irving in an effort to quell the riots, with the Angels Flight murders pinned on Sheehan, and that he will have no choice but to keep quiet in order to save his job.

== TV adaptation ==
The events of Angels Flight were adapted as the main plotline in the fourth season of the Amazon Studios show Bosch.
