= The Night Fire =

2019 novel by Michael Connelly

- Hardcover edition
- Author: Michael Connelly
- Language: English
- Series: Harry Bosch
- Release number: 22
- Genre: Crime, mystery, thriller
- Publisher: Little, Brown and Company
- Publication date: October 22, 2019
- Publication place: United States
- Media type: Print (hardback & paperback)
- Pages: 405
- ISBN: 978-0-316-48561-6
- OCLC: 1107434674
- Dewey Decimal: 813/.6
- LC Class: PS3553.O51165 N54 2019
- Preceded by: Dark Sacred Night
- Followed by: The Dark Hours

The Night Fire is a crime thriller novel, and the thirty-third novel by American author Michael Connelly, and the twenty-second novel featuring Los Angeles Police Department detective Harry Bosch, and also the third novel featuring Renee Ballard.

The book was published on October 22, 2019 by Little, Brown and Company.

== Plot ==
Retired LAPD homicide detective Harry Bosch attends the funeral of John Jack Thompson, a retired detective who mentored him decades earlier. Thompson's widow gives Bosch a murder book about John Hilton, a 24-year-old ex-con shot dead near Melrose Avenue in 1990. Bosch leaves it at Hollywood Station for Renée Ballard, assigned to overnight duty after filing a sexual harassment complaint against Captain Robert Olivas.

Ballard doubts the theory that Hilton died during a drug robbery. Detectives never questioned Elvin Kidd, a Rolling 60s Crips street boss, and let a narcotics handler question informant Dennard Dorsey. Blackened interview lines raise Ballard's suspicions about Thompson.

Dorsey says Kidd visited the alley on the murder date and ordered dealers to leave. Hilton's former roommate, Nathan Brazil, says Hilton loved a man who protected him behind bars.

Bosch reviews a case for his half brother, defense attorney Mickey Haller. Haller's client, Jeffrey Herstadt, faces charges for killing Judge Walter Montgomery. Bosch learns that EMT Albert Morales used one pulse oximeter on both men within an hour, allowing DNA transfer. Morales testifies, and prosecutors drop the charges.

Bosch tells Haller he has chronic myeloid leukemia, likely caused by exposure to stolen radioactive caesium twelve years earlier. He asks Haller to seek compensation for his daughter, Maddie.

A homeless man killed in a tent fire is named Edison Banks Jr., heir to a San Diego shipping fortune. Ballard supplies video of a woman buying vodka before the fire, then uses Olivas's signature on a form to obtain a wiretap on Kidd's phones. Kidd hires Marcel Dupree to kill Dorsey in jail. Ballard arrests Dupree, finds a hidden gun, protects Dorsey, and records Kidd discussing Hilton's killing. Prosecutor Selma Robinson charges Kidd. His wife Cynthia points a gun at Ballard during his arrest; an officer shoots her. Kidd flees, but Ballard catches him.

Bosch finds Hilton's birth record naming Thompson as his father. Thompson concealed his son's case, and detectives may have hidden the truth to protect him. Ballard and Bosch tie Banks's death to law firm Michaelson & Mitchell. They spot a woman at multiple crime scenes by her inward-turning walk. Bosch enters lawyer Clayton Manley's office and finds a file marked TRANSFER. Manley falls from a roof; an assassin kills partner Samuel Mitchell and admits Michaelson ordered the deaths. She stabs Ballard but escapes, and Ballard survives surgery. The fingerprints name the killer Catarina Cava. Michaelson is arrested while fleeing; Ballard arrests Cava in Las Vegas. Olivas conceals Ballard's forged signature. Bosch shares a file on a 1982 student murder, and Ballard agrees to revisit it with him.

== Reception ==
Richard Klinzman of The Florida Times-Union wrote: "Three main characters and three intriguing cases keep this trio engaged along with the reader carefully pulling the threads together. This is another great read from the master of the crime thriller." Oline H. Cogdill of the Sun Sentinel praised the "strong" plots, the "breathless" action and the "sturdy" and "deep" characterisation, writing that the differences between the characters of Bosch and Ballard "make for good tension and a plot that again showcases Connelly's high standards." Kirkus Reviews wrote: "Middling for this standout series but guaranteed to please anyone who thinks the cops sometimes get it wrong."
