= The Last Coyote =

1995 novel by Michael Connelly

- Hardcover edition
- Author: Michael Connelly
- Language: English
- Series: Harry Bosch
- Release number: 4
- Genre: Crime, mystery, thriller
- Publisher: Little, Brown and Company
- Publication date: June 1, 1995
- Publication place: United States
- Media type: Print (hardcover, paperback)
- Pages: 400 pp.
- ISBN: 0-316-15390-7
- OCLC: 31167315
- Dewey Decimal: 813/.54 20
- LC Class: PS3553.O51165 L37 1995
- Preceded by: The Concrete Blonde
- Followed by: Trunk Music

The Last Coyote is a crime thriller novel, and the fourth novel by American author Michael Connelly, featuring the Los Angeles detective Hieronymus "Harry" Bosch.

The Last Coyote was released by Little, Brown and Company on June 1, 1995, the novel won the 1996 Dilys Award given by the Independent Mystery Booksellers Association.

== Plot ==
Following an incident at work, the Los Angeles Police Department puts Detective Harry Bosch on involuntary stress leave and requires him to undergo therapy sessions with a police psychologist, Carmen Hinojos. Meanwhile, Bosch decides to investigate the unsolved murder of his mother, Marjorie Lowe, a prostitute who was strangled when Harry was twelve years old. He visits Meredith Roman, a friend of his mother's, and learns that she was going to meet local prosecutor Arno Conklin at Hancock Park on the night of the murder.

With the help of Los Angeles Times crime reporter Keisha Russell, Bosch investigates Conklin; his close associate Gordon Mittel; and Marjorie's pimp, Johnny Fox. He discovers that Fox was apparently killed in a hit and run while distributing campaign literature for Conklin. He also learns that Mittel is now an influential political donor. Identifying himself as his adversarial superior, Harvey Pounds, Bosch crashes Mittel's fundraiser and asks for an envelope to be delivered to Mittel, which contains a copy of the newspaper article about Fox's death.

Looking at city records, Bosch finds out that only one of the original investigating officers, Jake McKittrick, is still alive and residing in Florida. Visiting McKittrick, he learns that at the beginning of the investigation, his senior partner, Eno, was called into the Assistant DA's office and was told not to investigate Fox; the only way they could interview him was in Conklin's office, in the presence of Conklin and Mittel. After that interview, the investigation went cold.

To gain entrance to the gated community where McKittrick lives, Bosch pretends he is interested in a house for sale. He eventually has a romantic encounter with the homeowner, Jasmine Corian. Bosch then stops in Las Vegas to visit Eno's widow. Harry intimidates the woman posing as the widow's sister, who is taking care of the 90-year-old invalid, into letting him take some of Eno's old files. From the files, he discovers that Eno had been receiving $1,000 a week since the murder via a dummy corporation, the officers of which included Eno, Mittel and Conklin.

Upon returning to Los Angeles, Bosch learns that Pounds has been murdered in his absence and is brought to Parker Center for questioning. He realizes that using Pounds' name when trying to scare Mittel at the fundraiser resulted in his death. Keisha gives Bosch the identity and address of Monte Kim, the writer of the article on Fox. Kim tells Bosch that he possessed photos of Conklin and Fox in the company of Marjorie and Meredith, using them to blackmail Conklin into giving Kim a job.

Confronting Conklin, Bosch learns that he and Marjorie were planning to get married on the day of the murder, with Conklin believing Mittel killed her. However, Bosch is soon abducted and held captive by Mittel, who tells him that Conklin is dead. Bosch manages to overwhelm Mittel's henchman, Jonathan Vaughn, and knocks him out with a billiard ball. A pursuit and struggle with Bosch causes Mittel to take a fatal fall off a cliff. Bosch returns to the house but finds Vaughn missing. He arranges to have Mittel's fingerprints compared to those belonging to his mother's killer but finds they do not match.

During a therapy session, Hinojos looks at Marjorie's crime-scene photos and notices a discrepancy in her clothing. This causes Bosch to realize that Meredith killed his mother. He visits Meredith's house, only to learn that she has committed suicide. Vaughn confronts him with a gun and reveals the truth: He is Johnny Fox, having faked his death, and he had killed Pounds and Conklin. The police arrive, and Fox is shot while trying to escape. Bosch visits Jasmine in Florida.

== Reception ==
Library Journal said that The Last Coyote had "prose that cuts to the quick, a masterfully interwoven plot and gripping suspense".

== Awards and nominations ==
The Last Coyote won the 1996 Dilys Award given by the Independent Mystery Booksellers Association.

The book was a nominee for the 1996 Anthony Award, the 1996 Macavity Award and the 1996 Hammett Prize.
