= Sound of Redemption: The Frank Morgan Story =

- Directed by: N.C. Heikin
- Written by: N.C. Heikin; Delfeayo Marsalis
- Story by: Michael Connelly
- Produced by: James Egan; Su Kim
- Cinematography: Kyle Saylors
- Edited by: Kate Amend, A.C.E.; Katie Flint
- Music by: Matt Savage
- Release date: June 14, 2014 (LA Film Fest)
- Running time: 84 minutes
- Country: United States
- Language: English

Sound of Redemption: The Frank Morgan Story is a 2014 documentary film directed by N.C. Heikin. The film focuses on Frank Morgan, a jazz saxophonist and the protégé of Charlie Parker. Funding for the film was partially raised through a successful Kickstarter campaign.

Sound of Redemption had its world premiere at the 2014 Los Angeles Film Festival.

== Synopsis ==
Frank Morgan was a jazz saxophonist who got addicted to heroin and resorted to theft and cons in order to feed his addiction. As a result he spent a large portion of his life in prisons such as San Quentin. The film looks at Morgan's life via his archived footage and concert performances and through interviews with Morgan and the people who knew him. Filming also took place at the San Quentin State Prison showing the preparation and performance of a tribute concert.

== Reception ==
The Los Angeles Daily News wrote a favorable review for the film, writing "N.C. Heikin's terrific music documentary interweaves a great concert by the late jazzman's admirers and acolytes at the Bay Area prison with a stirring history of both the L.A. music scene and mid-century, African American show business in general. But really, the kickiest part is when it recounts the ingenious criminal schemes Morgan dreamed up to support his gargantuan heroin habit." The Hollywood Reporter was slightly more mixed, stating "Despite a surfeit of talking-head commentary, the film has a strong feel for the emotion behind Frank Morgan's acclaimed bebop."
