= Nancy Atherton =

American writer

Nancy Atherton is an American writer and author of the Aunt Dimity mystery novel series, which presently extends to twenty-five volumes.

Atherton lives in Colorado Springs, Colorado. (Note: The aggregate rating for all of her books at LibraryThing is **** (3.75) stars. LibraryThing, author ratings – Nancy Atherton.)

== Aunt Dimity series ==
The series follows the adventures of American Lori Shepherd and her growing family as she resolves mysteries with the help of her deceased benefactor, Aunt Dimity, who communicates with her from the spirit world by means of a blue leather-bound writing journal. The primary setting is the fictitious village of Finch in the Cotswolds of England and includes most of the population in supporting roles, but several books are set in other locales in the United Kingdom or abroad.

Each book contains a recipe for a bread or pastry which is integral to the story.

Listed in chronological order (except for Aunt Dimity and the Duke, which serves as a series prequel) and by Series No. of Publication:

1. Aunt Dimity's Death (1992) New York: Penguin Group USA ISBN 0-670-84449-7; ISBN 978-0-670-84449-4. Voted "One of the Century's 100 Favorite Mysteries" by the Independent Mystery Booksellers Association. Featured recipe: Beth's Oatmeal Cookies.
2. Aunt Dimity and the Duke (1994) nominated for the Dilys Award by the Independent Mystery Booksellers Association, New York: Penguin USA 1995 ISBN 0-14-017841-4; ISBN 978-0-14-017841-8. Featured recipe: Nell's Strawberry Tarts.
3. Aunt Dimity's Good Deed (1996) New York: Penguin USA ISBN 0-14-025881-7; ISBN 978-0-14-025881-3. Featured recipe: Uncle Tom's Butterscotch Brownies.
4. Aunt Dimity Digs In (1998) New York: Penguin Group ISBN 978-0-14-027569-8; ISBN 0-14-027569-X. Featured recipe: Lilian's Lemon Bars.
5. Aunt Dimity's Christmas (1999) New York: Penguin Group USA ISBN 0-14-029630-1; ISBN 978-0-670-88453-7; ISBN 0-670-88453-7. Featured recipe: Angel Cookies.
6. Aunt Dimity Beats the Devil (2000) New York: Penguin Group USA ISBN 978-0-14-100219-4; ISBN 0-14-100219-0. Featured recipe: Claire's Lace Cookies.
7. Aunt Dimity: Detective (September 30, 2001) New York: Penguin Books ISBN 0-14-200154-6; ISBN 978-0-14-200154-7. Featured recipe: The Pym Sisters' Gingerbread.
8. Aunt Dimity Takes a Holiday (May 4, 2003) New York: Viking ISBN 978-0-670-03200-6; ISBN 0-670-03200-X. Featured recipe: Winnie's Treacle Tart.
9. Aunt Dimity: Snowbound (June 23, 2004) City: Penguin (Non-Classics) ISBN 978-0-14-303458-2; ISBN 0-14-303458-8. Featured recipe: Catchpole's Apricot Compote.
10. Aunt Dimity and the Next of Kin (2005) New York: Viking, ISBN 978-0-670-03378-2; ISBN 0-670-03378-2. Featured recipe: Miss Beacham's Raisin Bread.
11. Aunt Dimity and the Deep Blue Sea (2006) New York: Viking ISBN 978-0-670-03476-5; ISBN 0-670-03476-2. Featured recipe: Sir Percy's Favorite Sticky Lemon Cake.
12. Aunt Dimity Goes West City: Penguin (Non-Classics) (2005) ISBN 0-14-303458-8; ISBN 978-0-14-303458-2; ISBN 978-0-14-303458-2. Featured recipe: Carrie Vyne's Calico Cookies.
13. Aunt Dimity: Vampire Hunter (2008) New York: Viking Press ISBN 0-670-01854-6; ISBN 978-0-670-01854-3. Featured recipe: Charlotte's Jammy Biscuits.
14. Aunt Dimity Slays the Dragon (2009) New York: Viking Press ISBN 0-670-02050-8; ISBN 978-0-670-02050-8. Featured recipe: King Wilfred's Honey Cakes.
15. Aunt Dimity Down Under 224 pages New York: Viking Adult (February 18, 2010) ISBN 0-670-02144-X; ISBN 978-0-670-02144-4. Featured recipe: Donna's Anzac Biscuits
16. Aunt Dimity and the Family Tree 229 pages New York: Viking Adult (February 17, 2011) ISBN 0-670-02243-8; ISBN 978-0-670-02243-4. Featured recipe: Aunt Dimity's Seed Cake
17. Aunt Dimity and the Village Witch 232 pages New York: Viking Adult (April 26, 2012) ISBN 0-670-02341-8; ISBN 978-0-670-02341-7. Featured recipe: Amelia Thistle's Brown Bread
18. Aunt Dimity and the Lost Prince 256 pages New York: Viking Adult (April 18, 2013) ISBN 0-670-02668-9; ISBN 978-0-670-02668-5. Featured recipe: Mama Markov's Russian Tea Cakes
19. Aunt Dimity and the Wishing Well 288 pages New York: Viking (April 17, 2014) ISBN 978-0670026692. Featured recipe: Sally Pyne's Summer Pudding
20. Aunt Dimity and the Summer King 240 pages New York: Viking (April 14, 2015) ISBN 978-0670026708. Featured recipe: Harriet's Pinwheel Cookies
21. Aunt Dimity and the Buried Treasure 231 pages New York: Viking (2016) ISBN 9781101981290. Featured recipe: Eggless Fruit Cake
22. Aunt Dimity and the Widow's Curse (2017) 240 pages New York: Viking (2017) ISBN 978-1101981320. Featured recipe: Minnie's Melting Moments
23. Aunt Dimity and the King's Ransom (2018) 240 pages New York: Viking (2018) ISBN 978-0525522652. Featured recipe: Steve's Apple Crumble
24. Aunt Dimity and the Heart of Gold (2019) 240 pages New York Viking (June 18, 2019) ISBN 978-0525522683.
25. Aunt Dimity and the Enchanted Cottage (2022) 256 pages New York Viking (May 3, 2022) ISBN 978-0593295779.

Also: Introducing Aunt Dimity, Paranormal Detective (2009, New York: Viking Press ISBN 978-0-14-311606-6), an omnibus edition reprinting the first two books in the series (Aunt Dimity's Death and Aunt Dimity and the Duke)

== Other works ==
She has also contributed to one novel, titled Naked came the farmer: a round-robin rural romance and murder mystery (Paperback). Elmwood, Illinois: Mayfly Productions. 1998. ISBN 9780962461378. along with thirteen other authors.
