= The Waiting (Connelly novel) =

2024 novel by Michael Connelly

- Hardcover edition
- Author: Michael Connelly
- Language: English
- Series: Harry Bosch
- Release number: 25
- Genre: Crime, mystery, thriller
- Publisher: Little, Brown and Company
- Publication date: October 15, 2024
- Publication place: United States
- Media type: Print (hardback & paperback)
- Pages: 407
- ISBN: 978-0-316-56379-6
- OCLC: 1419681704
- Dewey Decimal: 813.6
- Preceded by: Desert Star
- Followed by: The Hollow

The Waiting is a crime thriller novel, and the thirty-ninth novel by American author Michael Connelly, and the twenty-fifth novel featuring Los Angeles Police Department detective Harry Bosch, and also the sixth novel featuring Renee Ballard.

The book was published on October 15, 2024 by Little, Brown and Company.

== Plot ==
Renée Ballard runs LAPD's Open-Unsolved Unit, a cold-case squad staffed by volunteers, including retired FBI agent Tom Laffont, ex-prosecutor Paul Masser, former Las Vegas officer Lilia Aghzafi, software entrepreneur Anders Persson, and genetic genealogist Colleen Hatteras. Their cases rely on modern forensic methods to identify killers.

After surfing at Staircases, Ballard finds her car burglarized and her badge, gun, phone, wallet, and police ID missing but not afraid colleagues might exploit the theft to remove her from her post, she investigates privately. She traces the crime to Dean Delsey and his father, Robert, who target surfers through a wave app. Her badge has been sold to an arms buyer. Ballard asks retired detective Harry Bosch, her mentor, for help. Posing as a weapons dealer, Bosch meets the buyer. Ballard follows him to a caravan of recreational vehicles and finds guns and an LAPD SWAT vest. She overhears plans for a Presidents' Day attack intended to surpass Las Vegas's 2017 mass shooting.

Ballard and Bosch identify the buyer as Thomas Dehaven, a fugitive wanted for killing his ex-wife and sedition tied to January 6, 2021. The FBI agents arrange a controlled weapons purchase. Dehaven draws his gun, and snipers kill him and his driver. Bosch survives and recovers Ballard's badge.

Meanwhile, a familial DNA match ties the Pillowcase Rapist, active from 2000 to 2005, to Nicholas Purcell, recently arrested for domestic violence. His father, Judge Jonathan Purcell, denies biological parenthood through DNA testing. The judge admits Nicholas was born to Mallory Richardson, a neighbor's teenage daughter who died by suicide. Mallory's mother recalls her prom date, Rodney Van Ness. The school records identify three other boys who shared a hotel room with him. Van Ness admits consensual sex with Mallory, but says she passed out afterward. His DNA sample may clear him.

Maddie Bosch, Harry's daughter and a patrol officer, brings Ballard photos from a storage unit owned by deceased photographer Emmitt Thawyer. The images include Elizabeth Short, the Black Dahlia, murdered in 1947. A hidden basement in Thawyer's house contains traces of blood, while physical evidence ties eight murders to that location. District attorney Ernest O'Fallon refuses prosecution twice, unwilling to benefit Police Chief Detry, whose opponent O'Fallon supported.

Colleen disappears, and Ballard finds her strangled and shot. The phone records show Colleen called Andrew Bennett, a Laguna Beach realtor among Mallory's former classmates. Ballard finds her stolen gun in Bennett's briefcase. He admits killing Colleen, but Ballard disarms him with her backup Ruger and arrests him. Detry announces Bennett as both the Pillowcase Rapist and Colleen's killer.

Ballard publicizes the Black Dahlia evidence, earning Maddie credit and protecting her place in the unit. Therapy helps Ballard examine her abandonment: her father drowned surfing, while her mother, Makani, vanished when Ballard was fourteen. After years missing following Maui wildfires, Makani is found alive and arrested on old traffic warrants.

In Maui, Ballard studies her mother's address and drives toward the stables where her childhood horse once lived, preparing to meet the woman who left her.

== Reception ==
Publishers Weekly gave the novel a starred review, praising its suspense, characterization, and investigative plotting, and concluding that it ranks among Connelly's best works. Kirkus Reviews praised the novel's interwoven investigations and its continuation of the Renée Ballard series, ending its review with an approving comment about the series' future. The Los Angeles Times described the novel as a satisfying continuation of the Ballard and Bosch books, highlighting its development of the characters and its introduction of a possible successor to Harry Bosch.
