= Two Kinds of Truth =

2017 novel by Michael Connelly

- Hardcover edition
- Author: Michael Connelly
- Language: English
- Series: Harry Bosch
- Release number: 20
- Genre: Crime, mystery, thriller
- Publisher: Little, Brown and Company
- Publication date: October 31, 2017
- Publication place: United States
- Media type: Print (hardback & paperback)
- Pages: 402
- ISBN: 978-0-316-22590-8
- OCLC: 973796531
- Dewey Decimal: 813/.54
- Preceded by: The Wrong Side of Goodbye
- Followed by: Dark Sacred Night

Two Kinds of Truth is a crime thriller novel, and the thirty-first novel by American author Michael Connelly, and the twentieth novel featuring Los Angeles Police Department detective Harry Bosch.

The book was published on October 31, 2017 by Little, Brown and Company.

== Plot ==
Harry Bosch volunteers as a cold-case detective for San Fernando Police Department (SFPD), examining a missing woman's file when Detective Bella Lourdes warns him that LAPD officers and a deputy district attorney are coming. His former partner, Lucia Soto, arrives with Detective Bob Tapscott and Deputy district attorney Alex Kennedy, head of the Conviction Integrity Unit. Kennedy says his unit is reviewing Preston Borders's 1988 conviction for raping and killing actress Danielle Skyler. Fresh DNA tests match Lucas John Olmer, a serial rapist who died behind bars in 2015, rather than Borders. Kennedy plans to challenge the verdict and warns Bosch of a possible lawsuit. Bosch defends his original findings, but Kennedy denies him access to the new evidence.

Lourdes soon reports two killings at La Farmacia Familia: pharmacist José Esquivel Sr. and his son, José Jr. Security footage shows two masked gunmen shooting both men and stealing prescription drugs.

Bosch obtains the unit's file and revisits Skyler's case. In 1988, he and partner Frankie Sheehan found Skyler raped, strangled, and mutilated at her Toluca Lake apartment. The witness accounts, casting-office records, and Borders's lies during questioning led them to him. A search of Borders's apartment uncovered Skyler's prized sea-horse pendant. Borders claimed he had bought a matching pendant, but jurors convicted him and sentenced him to death.

The pharmacy killings take Bosch and Lourdes to a Pacoima clinic accused of issuing fraudulent oxycodone prescriptions. They watch vans carry recruited patients to Whiteman Airport, where a plane departs without a flight plan. Jerry Edgar, Bosch's former partner and now a California Medical Board investigator, names a Russian-Armenian drug syndicate operating near the Salton Sea under Santos. Edgar warns that a DEA informant was thrown from a plane.

Bosch learns attorney Lance Cronyn visited both Borders and Olmer behind bars. His half brother, defense attorney Mickey Haller, says the city must cover Bosch's legal costs if he acted honestly. Haller locates David Siegel, Borders's supposedly deceased defense attorney, at a nursing home. Court papers show Cronyn obtained an order splitting Olmer's DNA sample, which was never returned. Bosch suspects Cronyn used it to frame Borders and secure millions through a wrongful-conviction settlement.

DEA agent Charlie Hovan recruits Bosch for an undercover mission targeting Santos. Posing as an addict, Bosch flies to a settlement near the Salton Sea, where Russian gunmen run a drug operation. He spots the men suspected of killing the Esquivels. After one recognizes him and orders him to jump, Bosch signals for rescue and kills the armed man with a concealed stiletto. The second Russian jumps from the aircraft. Bosch takes control and flies to Whiteman Airport under DEA escort.

A Los Angeles Times article accuses Bosch of planting evidence. He calls his daughter Maddie, whose worried messages trouble him. He then finds Elizabeth Clayton, whom he rescued from the drug operation, nearly unconscious after an overdose. With Edgar's help, Bosch takes her to the Road Saints clubhouse, where Cisco Wojciechowski oversees her recovery. Bosch mentions Daisy, Clayton's murdered daughter, encouraging her to accept rehabilitation.

At a court hearing, Haller presents evidence against Cronyn and his wife Katherine. He cites Spencer's financial troubles, his presence on video of the evidence box, and Siegel's account. Haller claims Spencer awaits outside, ready to testify. Borders angrily turns against Cronyn, and Kennedy withdraws state backing for the appeal. Borders abandons his petition, and the judge holds both Cronyns in criminal contempt. Police searching Spencer's locker find stickers used to open and reseal the evidence box.

Bosch gives Cisco nearly $10,000 for Clayton's treatment. Soto apologizes for doubting him, and Bosch asks her to review the unsolved 2009 killing of Daisy Clayton. His missing-person case also ends when Esme Tavares contacts him alive, having fled an abusive husband and adopted a new identity. SFPD Chief Anthony Valdez removes her old flyer. Bosch keeps her photo on his wall as a reminder of his error. Soto then finds fresh avenues for examining Daisy's case, and Bosch asks to join her.

== Reception ==
Mark Sanderson of the Evening Standard wrote that Connelly "splices his twin narratives into a super-gripping thriller that also adds depth and complexity to his central character" and called it "as brilliant as anything Connelly has written". A reviewer from The Times of India wrote that while the novel "starts slow", it "picks up the pace as it progresses" and features a "solid plot, with fascinating twists and some shocking moments." They considered the novel to be "one of Connelly's finest."

Jeff Ayers of the Associated Press called it a "well-written and engaging story from a master of the genre"; he wrote that Connelly "tells two compelling stories that individually would make a terrific read but together make an instant classic." Kirkus Reviews wrote that while the novel features "All the structural problems you’d expect from jamming two urgent but unrelated cases together", with much of the second half spent on "tying up increasingly low-impact loose ends"; further, the "marvelous" courthouse sequence "will bring you cheering to your feet."
