= Trunk Music =

1997 novel by Michael Connelly

- Hardcover edition
- Author: Michael Connelly
- Language: English
- Series: Harry Bosch
- Release number: 5
- Genre: Crime, mystery, thriller
- Publisher: Little, Brown and Company
- Publication date: January 28, 1997
- Publication place: United States
- Media type: Print (hardcover, paperback)
- Pages: 383 pp.
- ISBN: 0-316-15244-7
- OCLC: 34690895
- Dewey Decimal: 813/.54 20
- LC Class: PS3553.O51165 T78 1997
- Preceded by: The Last Coyote
- Followed by: Angels Flight

Trunk Music is a crime thriller novel, and the sixth novel by American author Michael Connelly, and the fifth featuring the Los Angeles detective Hieronymus "Harry" Bosch.

It was first published in January 28, 1997, and won the 1998 Barry Award.

== Plot ==
Harry Bosch returns to the Homicide Division after a suspension and is called to Mulholland Drive, where a Rolls-Royce has been left above the road. Inside its trunk is Tony Aliso, a low-budget movie producer who has been shot in the head. The method resembles a mob killing commonly called "trunk music." Patrol officer Powers has handled the scene in an unusual manner, making Bosch suspect that the department may prefer a quiet answer rather than a thorough one.

Bosch joins Jerry Edgar and Kiz Rider as they examine Aliso's business and finances. His movie office also served as a place for moving money, while the IRS had been examining his accounts. At the studio, Bosch reviews security recordings and finds that someone entered the building and removed telephone wiretaps. The detectives learn that an LAPD unit installed the devices without judicial approval. Department commanders show little interest in pursuing the matter.

Bosch then travels to Las Vegas to establish where Aliso had been before his death. Casino recordings show Aliso playing poker with several people. Bosch recognizes Eleanor Wish, a former FBI agent with whom he had a personal history. He spends the night at her home. She is later taken to headquarters for questioning, but Bosch determines that she had no part in Aliso's death. Fingerprints found on Aliso's jacket match Luke "Lucky" Goshen.

Goshen is a senior associate of Las Vegas syndicate boss Joseph "Marks" Marconi. Bosch obtains a warrant and searches Goshen's home, where he finds a hidden handgun. Ballistics testing identifies the weapon as the gun used against Aliso. The evidence appears convincing, but Bosch remains uneasy because the gun was found with unusual ease. He begins considering whether Goshen has been deliberately placed in a position where he can be blamed.

The situation worsens when mobsters abduct Eleanor. Bosch locates the place where she is being held and enters the building, freeing her. He brings Goshen back to Los Angeles as a homicide suspect. On arrival, Bosch learns that Goshen is actually Roy Lindell, an undercover FBI agent. Federal supervisors accuse Bosch of planting the handgun at Lindell's home in an attempt to damage the FBI operation.

Bosch refuses to surrender his badge and continues examining Aliso's finances. He determines that Aliso had been taking money from syndicate accounts, giving the mob a reason to have him killed. The unauthorized wiretaps, the altered car scene, and the handgun all become parts of a larger dispute between law-enforcement agencies. Federal handlers had protected Lindell while attempting to conceal mistakes made during his assignment.

Bosch ultimately establishes that he did not plant the handgun and clears himself of the accusation. He also establishes what happened to Aliso. His time with Eleanor leaves their personal bond uncertain, since both have made choices that keep them apart. Bosch remains distrustful of senior officials and continues serving as a homicide detective, convinced that victims deserve answers even when agencies would rather protect themselves.

== Adaptation ==
Season 2 of the Amazon series Bosch is loosely adapted from this novel. After Harry captures a suspect, Detective Bosch tells him, "I'm going to make sure you live..."
