= Dark Sacred Night =

2018 novel by Michael Connelly

- Hardcover edition
- Author: Michael Connelly
- Language: English
- Series: Harry Bosch
- Release number: 21
- Genre: Crime, mystery, thriller
- Publisher: Little, Brown and Company
- Publication date: October 30, 2018
- Publication place: United States
- Media type: Print (hardback & paperback)
- Pages: 433
- ISBN: 978-0-316-48480-0
- OCLC: 1020450924
- Dewey Decimal: 813/.54
- LC Class: PS3553.O51165 D37 2018
- Preceded by: Two Kinds of Truth
- Followed by: The Night Fire

Dark Sacred Night is a crime thriller novel, and the thirty-second novel by American author Michael Connelly, and the twenty-first novel featuring Los Angeles Police Department detective Harry Bosch, and also the second novel featuring Renee Ballard.

The book was published on October 30, 2018 by Little, Brown and Company.

== Plot ==
Renée Ballard is assigned to overnight duty at LAPD's Hollywood Division after filing a sexual harassment complaint against her former supervisor. One night, she catches retired detective Harry Bosch searching file cabinets. Bosch now holds a reserve officer position with San Fernando Police Department. Sergeant Stan Dvorek tells Ballard that Bosch is examining the unsolved 2009 murder of Daisy Clayton, a 15-year-old runaway found dead in a dumpster on Cahuenga Boulevard.

Ballard studies Daisy's records. The teenager repeatedly ran away from her mother, Elizabeth Clayton, to live on Hollywood's streets. Her companion, Adam Sands, was jailed on the night she vanished. Daisy suffered sexual assault, physical abuse, and strangulation; her fingernails were removed, and bleach was used on her body. A circular bruise on her hip bore the letters A-S-P. Ballard contacts Detective Lucia Soto, Bosch's former partner, and receives permission to review the case. She meets Bosch in San Fernando and offers to search thousands of old street-interview cards. Bosch says the bruise matches the logo on an American Storage Products container used to hold Daisy's body.

Bosch also reviews the 14-year-old murder of gang leader Cristobal Vega, known as Uncle Murda. Prison interviews name Tranquillo Cortez, Vega's nephew by marriage, as a suspect. Witness Martin Perez saw Cortez test a homemade silencer at a muffler shop. Police recover bullets, but damage prevents a ballistic match. Perez is later found shot dead, with Bosch's business card between his teeth.

Bosch and Detective Bella Lourdes trace the leak to Detective Oscar Luzon, who admits approaching a gang member. Luzon then attempts suicide in his cell, suffers a skull fracture, and remains in grave condition. Chief Valdez suspends Bosch.

Elizabeth Clayton has been staying at Bosch's home during her recovery from opioid addiction. After she and Bosch sleep together, she vanishes. Bosch traces her ride to a bus terminal but cannot locate her. Her presence had also strained his bond with his college-age daughter, Maddie.

Ballard and Bosch sort thousands of street-interview cards while attending to other police duties. Ballard checks street preacher John McMullen, whose van was at a garage during Daisy's disappearance, clearing him. She also handles a burglary, a false rape accusation against a celebrity, and a missing-person case that ends with a roommate admitting murder and dismemberment.

When Bosch vanishes, Ballard uses Maddie's phone-tracking app to locate his signal near an abandoned compound above Sylmar. With tactical flight officer Heather Rourke's help, Ballard, Lourdes, and another detective find Bosch bound inside a dog kennel. Members of the Mexican Mafia had held him for Cortez. The guard fled after a police helicopter flew overhead. Ballard frees Bosch.

LAPD's Special Investigation Section lures Cortez to a meeting using a fake text. Armed officers kill Cortez and his bodyguard when the latter exits their car with a gun.

Ballard traces Daisy's murder to Roger Dillon, a crime-scene cleaner she met during a burglary inquiry. Dillon had reported finding evidence at another crime scene on the night Daisy vanished. His company ordered containers matching the mark on Daisy's skin. Ballard enters his warehouse through a damaged skylight and finds a mattress, a floor-mounted restraint loop, and a broken pink fingernail. Dillon locks her inside a truck, but Bosch arrives and knocks him unconscious.

Bosch records Dillon's unsolicited admission that he killed Daisy using a bleach-filled container. Dillon names Sarah Bender, daughter of a nightclub owner, as another victim. Bosch resists an urge to summon Sarah's father and instead calls detectives.

The next morning, Bosch views Elizabeth's body at the medical examiner's office; she died from an apparent opioid overdose in a Sunset Boulevard motel. Ballard confirms police recovered fingerprints and DNA from Dillon's warehouse. Bosch admits he nearly arranged a killing outside the law.

Bosch proposes a lasting partnership, with Ballard assigned inside LAPD and him operating independently. Ballard agrees on one condition: they may bend rules but must never break them.

== Reception ==
Maureen Corrigan of The Washington Post called it "ingenious, frantically suspenseful, and very, very bleak." Kirkus Reviews stated: "Fans who don't think the supporting cases run away with the story will marvel at Connelly's remarkable ability to keep them all not only suitably mystifying, but deeply humane, as if he were the Ross Macdonald of the police procedural." Charles Finch of USA Today rated the novel 3 stars out of 4 and wrote that while the story is "fairly meandering and uncertain", Connelly eventually "hits his stride" and his "denouement here is thrilling."
