= Echo Park (novel) =

2006 novel by Michael Connelly

- First edition
- Author: Michael Connelly
- Language: English
- Series: Harry Bosch
- Release number: 12
- Genre: Crime, mystery, thriller
- Publisher: Little, Brown and Company
- Publication date: October 9, 2006
- Publication place: United States
- Media type: Print (hardback & paperback)
- Pages: 446
- ISBN: 0-7528-6584-6 (UK), (USA)
- OCLC: 67374799
- Preceded by: The Closers
- Followed by: The Overlook

Echo Park is a crime thriller novel, and the seventeenth novel by American author Michael Connelly, and the twelfth featuring the Los Angeles detective Hieronymus "Harry" Bosch.

The book was published on October 9, 2006 by Little, Brown and Company.

== Plot ==
In 1993, Los Angeles Police Department detectives Harry Bosch and Jerry Edgar investigate the disappearance of Marie Gesto, a young equestrian. They suspect Anthony Garland, whose father, Thomas Rex Garland, is a wealthy industrialist. Anthony had dated a woman resembling Marie and displayed a violent temper. Despite their suspicions, the detectives lack evidence to charge him, and the case goes cold. Bosch continues contacting Marie's parents to reassure them that he has not forgotten their daughter.

Thirteen years later, Bosch works in the Open-Unsolved Unit with Kizmin "Kiz" Rider. A traffic stop in Echo Park leads to the arrest of Raynard Waits, a man transporting human remains. Waits confesses to murdering several prostitutes and runaways, as well as pawnshop owner Daniel Fitzpatrick during the 1992 Los Angeles riots and Marie Gesto. The confession raises questions about why detectives failed to act on an alleged tip concerning Marie's disappearance.

Bosch consults his former girlfriend Rachel Walling, an FBI agent and criminal profiler. Bosch and Walling speculate why Waits might have been carrying the remains through Echo Park, when nearby Griffith Park offered a more convenient area. As they examine Waits' movements and the neighborhood, their former romance resumes. Waits agrees to lead police to Marie's remains in exchange for a plea bargain that excludes the death penalty. During the trip to Beachwood Canyon, prosecutor Richard O'Shea orders Waits' handcuffs removed. Waits steals Detective Freddy Olivas' gun, kills Olivas, wounds Rider, and escapes. Forensic examination confirms the remains belong to Marie.

Bosch soon suspects that records were altered to conceal misconduct and make him appear responsible for overlooking Waits. He believes O'Shea, seeking election as district attorney, may have arranged the confession to close eleven unsolved murders and protect Anthony Garland. Evidence also indicates that Waits falsely confessed to Marie's murder to secure his escape opportunity. Meanwhile, Bosch and Walling establish that Fitzpatrick was murdered by a customer who later assumed the identity of Raynard Waits through a falsified birth certificate.

After Waits kidnaps another woman, Bosch and Walling examine his juvenile records. His childhood included foster homes and youth detention facilities, but he spent a stable period with the Saxon family in Echo Park. They visit his former foster mother, who tells them that Robbie, Waits' childhood name, rents the family's garage. Despite Walling's warning to await backup, Bosch enters because the captive's life may be in immediate danger.

Waits fires from a concealed hillside tunnel behind the garage. Bosch enters the passage and finds bones belonging to Waits' victims. Drawing on his own childhood experiences in foster care, Bosch tries to persuade Waits to surrender. Waits admits that Swann arranged O'Shea's bargain to give him an escape opportunity. Bosch ultimately shoots and kills him while rescuing the captive.

Bosch confronts O'Shea, who denies wrongdoing. Further examination points toward Bosch's superior, Abel Pratt, as the person who altered the records and manipulated the others. Bosch and Walling catch Pratt threatening Swann. Pratt agrees to expose the Garlands in exchange for immunity. During a recorded meeting, Thomas Garland admits paying Pratt one million dollars. Anthony kills Pratt before FBI agents shoot Anthony.

Walling suspects Bosch deliberately arranged Pratt's death by exploiting Anthony's temper. Bosch denies this, but she leaves angrily. Rider returns from the hospital and transfers to an office position near the police chief, hoping to protect Bosch from departmental pressure.

== Adaptations ==
The prologue was adapted as a short film called The high tower. Tim Abell played Bosch, whilst crime author Gar Anthony Haywood played Jerry Edgar. Len Cariou was the narrator.

Raynard Waits was portrayed by Jason Gedrick in the TV adaptation Bosch.
