= Blood Work (novel) =

1998 novel by Michael Connelly

- First edition
- Author: Michael Connelly
- Language: English
- Series: Terry McCaleb
- Release number: 1
- Genre: Crime, mystery, thriller
- Publisher: Little, Brown and Company
- Publication date: March 2, 1998
- Publication place: United States
- Media type: Print (paperback), audiobook, e-book
- Pages: 393
- ISBN: 0316153990

Blood Work is a crime thriller novel, and the seventh novel by American author Michael Connelly which marks the first appearance of Terry McCaleb. The character later returns in A Darkness More Than Night (2000). The book was first published by Little, Brown and Company on March 2, 1998.

The book was used as the basis for the 2002 movie of the same name, starring Clint Eastwood. Connelly was inspired to write the story by a friend who received an organ transplant.

== Plot summary ==
Retired FBI profiler Terrell "Terry" McCaleb, the recent recipient of a heart transplant, is contacted by Graciela Rivers, the sister of his donor Gloria, and asked to investigate her death in an unsolved convenience store robbery. Terry had become a minor celebrity for his work chasing the "Code Killer", a Los Angeles-based serial killer who signed his notes with the code "903 472 568". He reluctantly agrees to help Graciela but finds the police handling the case to be extremely hostile. However, he is able to match the style of another killing to Gloria's and gets a copy of the files for both cases from Jaye Winston, the sheriff's deputy on that case. He discovers that the call reporting Gloria's shooting was placed slightly prior to the actual shooting, leading him to suspect that she was targeted for murder. He interviews the only witness to the second crime, a man called James Noone, but fails to learn much.

As he continues to investigate, against the wishes of his doctor, Terry discovers that the two cases, as well as a third, are linked through the use of a common gun and a common line said by the killer referencing The Godfather. He also learns that the three victims had Terry's blood type and were on a list of people who had previously donated blood; if the victims died, Terry would benefit from their death as a potential organ recipient. Because of this, the police on Gloria's case focus on Terry as the possible killer and get a warrant to search the fishing boat where he lives. The real killer plants evidence on the boat implicating Terry, but Terry finds and conceals it. Examining the facts again, Terry realizes that the distinctive attribute of the "Code Killer" was that the nine-digit code did not include a one, and that "James Noone" ("no one") is actually the Code Killer.

By following "Noone's" contact information, Terry and Jaye find the Code Killer's files, which prove that he had deliberately killed three people to get Terry a new heart. Although Terry is thus cleared, the fact that Gloria's death was directly due to his illness creates a rift in his increasingly personal relationship with Graciela and her nephew (now adopted son) Raymond, Gloria's son. Terry secretly traces the Code Killer to a location in Baja California that matches one "Noone" described. He then finds and is overpowered by the Code Killer, who tells him that he has kidnapped Graciela and Raymond and buried them alive. Despite serious medical problems from so much activity, Terry is able to kill the Code Killer and then uses the little information he has to locate and rescue Graciela and Raymond. Among the law enforcement officials, only Jaye figures out what really happened, and she looks the other way.

== Adaptation ==
The novel adaptation of the Blood Work, written by Michael Connelly, was directed by Clint Eastwood, who also starred as Terry McCaleb.
