= The Black Echo =

1992 book by Michael Connelly

- First edition cover
- Author: Michael Connelly
- Language: English language
- Series: Harry Bosch
- Release number: 1
- Genre: Crime, mystery, thriller
- Publisher: Little, Brown and Company
- Publication date: January 21, 1992
- Publication place: United States
- Media type: Print (hardcover, paperback)
- Pages: 375
- ISBN: 0-316-15361-3
- Followed by: The Black Ice

The Black Echo is the debut novel by American crime author Michael Connelly. The story follows on a centered on Los Angeles Police Department homicide detective Harry Bosch. It is the first book in the Harry Bosch series, and was followed by The Black Ice.

The book was published on January 21, 1992, and won the Mystery Writers of America Edgar Award for "Best First Novel" in 1992. Black Echo was also nominated for the 1993 Dilys Award, but lost to John Dunning's Booked to Die.

== Plot ==
After serving in the Vietnam War, Harry Bosch joined the Los Angeles Police Department and was eventually promoted to the elite Robbery-Homicide Division (RHD). However, after killing the main suspect in the "Dollmaker" serial killings, Bosch was demoted to the Hollywood Division's homicide bureau, where he is sometimes partnered with Detective Jerome "Jerry" Edgar.

Bosch's interest is piqued by the death of Billy Meadows, a fellow tunnel rat from the war who Bosch was friendly with. Based on his military history, Bosch suspects that Meadows' death may be connected to a spectacular bank robbery that occurred the previous month, in which the thieves employed the use of tunnels. Because bank robbery is a federal crime, Bosch approaches the FBI's Los Angeles office and is introduced to Special Agent-In-Charge John Rourke and his subordinate, Agent Eleanor Wish. Conceding that Bosch may have useful insight into the case, Rourke invites Bosch and Wish to temporarily partner up, with the LAPD's reluctant agreement. Bosch and Wish grow closer and eventually become lovers.

Bosch and Wish track Meadows' recent movements to "Charlie Company", a halfway house for traumatized Vietnam veterans, from which two other members of Meadows' old company have recently gone missing. The investigators also discover a connection with two Vietnamese expatriates who were high-ranking police officials in Saigon, then emigrated to the U.S. shortly before the end of the war. An associate of Wish informs the investigators that, in exchange for their help during the war, the U.S. government helped the Vietnamese policemen to convert their assets into diamonds (now worth several million dollars) and helped them emigrate. Bosch guesses that the diamonds were being kept in safe deposit boxes in at least two locations, and the thieves are now targeting the second one, which they identify by following the second Vietnamese man, Tranh.

Rourke organizes surveillance and SWAT units to discreetly watch the second vault location in Beverly Hills. Unfortunately, two internal affairs detectives who have been following Bosch mistake his surveillance for complicity in the robbery and insist on opening the vault, interrupting the thieves in the process. One of the detectives is shot dead and the other is put into a coma. Bosch fires at the thieves and follows them down into their tunnel but is wounded by their leader: Rourke, who as a military policeman in Vietnam worked with the government to convert the diamonds and assist with the emigration. Meadows was killed because he couldn't resist pawning a jade bracelet that was taken during the first heist. Rourke is about to kill Bosch when he is shot dead by Wish.

While recovering in the hospital, Bosch remembers Rourke saying something about his "share" of the heist being bigger thanks to the deaths of his two accomplices, but he didn't say he was keeping everything, meaning he had at least one other accomplice who is still at large. Bosch confronts Wish, who admits to being the third accomplice. Wish had believed her older brother was killed in the war, until the Vietnam Veterans Memorial was unveiled and his name was not listed on it. When her parents refused to tell her the truth, she investigated on her own and found that he returned to the U.S. on leave and had been killed after stumbling onto Rourke's scheme and demanding a cut. Wish didn't want any share of the heist, only revenge on Rourke and his accomplices. When she discovered Rourke was also in the FBI, she maneuvered herself into the Los Angeles office and subtly influenced an unsuspecting Rourke into planning the heist.

Wish pleads with Bosch that no one was supposed to get hurt and that her affection for him is genuine. Although he doesn't have enough evidence for her to be convicted, Bosch gives her an ultimatum: turn herself in and confess, or he will share the details with the Vietnamese men, who will come after her on their own terms. When she asks why, he says that someone has to answer for "Sharkey", a teenaged informant who assisted their early investigation but, thanks to Wish, was identified by Rourke and killed; Wish agrees. As a farewell gift, Wish sends Bosch her print of Edward Hopper's Nighthawks which he had admired in her home. He finds himself identifying with the man sitting at the extreme left of the painting, alone.

== Adaptation ==
Season 3 of the Amazon series Bosch is loosely adapted from this novel. After Harry captures a suspect, Detective Bosch tells him, "I'm going to make sure you live the rest of your life in the black echo."

== Awards ==
The Black Echo won the 1993 Edgar Award for "Best First Novel"; it was also nominated for the Anthony Award in the same category and the Dilys Award for "Best Novel".
