= The Concrete Blonde =

1994 novel by Michael Connelly

- Author: Michael Connelly
- Language: English
- Series: Harry Bosch
- Release number: 3
- Genre: Crime, mystery, thriller
- Publisher: Little, Brown and Company
- Publication date: June 1, 1994
- Publication place: United States
- Media type: Print (hardcover, paperback)
- Pages: 392
- ISBN: 0-316-15383-4
- OCLC: 28585568
- Dewey Decimal: 813/.54 20
- LC Class: PS3553.O51165 C65 1994
- Preceded by: The Black Ice
- Followed by: The Last Coyote

The Concrete Blonde is a crime thriller novel, and the third novel by American author Michael Connelly, featuring the Los Angeles detective Hieronymus "Harry" Bosch.

The Concrete Blonde was released by Little, Brown and Company on June 1, 1994, and was nominated for the 1995 Dilys Award, though it lost to Janet Evanovich's One for the Money. Connelly said that he obtained the seed idea for the novel by reading a book detailing actual cases, written for forensic professionals. It is written in the police procedural form of crime fiction. In this style, the detective interacts with a wide range of individuals who assist in the investigation.

== Plot ==
LAPD detective Harry Bosch is pursuing "The Dollmaker", a serial killer who applies makeup to his victims. After learning from a prostitute that a recent customer, Norman Church, possessed women's makeup in his bathroom, Bosch breaks into Church's residence and confronts him. Bosch fatally shoots Church when he starts to pull something from under his pillow, only to find that he was fetching his toupee. Bosch is cleared in the shooting by internal affairs; however, since he did not follow proper procedure, he is transferred from the elite Robbery-Homicide Division (RHD) back to the Hollywood table. The makeup is found to match those of nine of the Dollmaker's victims.

Four years later, while Bosch is being sued by Church's widow, police receive a note, purportedly from the Dollmaker, which leads to the discovery of a new victim killed using the same modus operandi. Although this victim was encased in concrete, unlike the original eleven victims, all other aspects of the killing are the same. This victim, along with two of the original victims, also fits a different pattern: they were large-breasted blondes in the local adult entertainment industry who also advertised as high-class prostitutes in sex magazines. Bosch and his task force suspect that the copycat, dubbed "the Follower," is Detective Mora from the vice unit. Mora has ties to the adult video industry, had insider knowledge of the Dollmaker case and was not at work during the killings not attributed to Church.

The task force puts Mora under surveillance, and Bosch breaks into his house looking for evidence that he is the Follower. Instead, Bosch finds that Mora has been making child pornography. Mora returns home, finds Bosch and threatens to kill him. The rest of the task force arrives, searches the house and determines that he is not the Follower. Believing he knows who the Follower is, Mora proposes a deal: he provides the name of a Professor Locke, agrees to quit the police force and all of his crimes will be ignored. Mora had received information that Locke had been seen on the set of adult movies where the slain women were cast members.

At his office, Bosch finds another note from the Follower, saying that he will be taking "his blonde." Bosch assumes that he means Bosch's girlfriend Sylvia. When she does not answer her phone, he sends police to her house. He visits an empty house, where a real estate agent appears to show it. Bosch finds Sylvia at his house and takes her to a hotel to protect her. She says that they must spend some time apart for her to decide if she can live with him and his dangerous job.

The next day, Bosch returns to court for his civil case as the jury is to restart their deliberations. Honey Chandler, the widow's attorney, does not appear. Bosch sends police to her house, as she is also a blonde. The jury reaches a verdict for the plaintiff and awards compensatory damages of one dollar and punitive damages of one dollar to Church's widow. When Bosch arrives at Chandler's house, he discovers that she has been dead for 48 hours, killed in the same manner as the other Dollmaker victims, except that she has burn and bite marks all over her body.

Locke, who had been missing for several days, shows up at the crime scene. Bosch and his partner, Jerome "Jerry" Edgar, interrogate Locke but realize he has a solid alibi. Bosch then follows a Los Angeles Times reporter, Joel Bremmer, and asks if he can come inside his house to purportedly discuss his court case. However, Bosch confronts him as being the Follower, having realized his culpability by the fact that his last letter had mentioned a Times article which hadn't been published yet. Bremmer fights Bosch and gets control of his gun. Bosch, playing on Bremmer's pride, gets him to confess. Bremmer attempts to shoot Bosch, but the gun is empty; Bosch grabs the magazine he had hidden in his sock, hits Bremmer with it and arrests him. Bosch had also used a hidden recording device to record Bremmer's confession.

The next day, Bosch forces the district attorney's office to charge Bremmer with first degree murder, as the filing attorney is not satisfied with the amount of evidence. The LAPD then obtain a warrant to obtain forensic evidence that is matched to Bremmer. A woman who owns a storage locker company recognizes Bremmer as having rented a locker under a false name, and police find videotapes of Bremmer's killings. Bremmer makes a deal for life without parole in exchange for leading police to the bodies of his other victims. Bosch takes two weeks off from work to make some home improvements. Sylvia eventually returns, and they re-unite and head off for a weekend together.

== Reception ==
Author Janet Evanovich said The Concrete Blonde was "a classic in Connelly's Harry Bosch detective series--and one of my favorites". The Weekly Standard said that Connelly "proved himself a master of courtroom give-and-take in The Concrete Blonde". The Library Journal review in 1994 said "slick plot twists, fast action and fine suspense mark this excellent thriller and courtroom drama".
