= A Darkness More Than Night =

2000 novel by Michael Connelly

- First edition
- Author: Michael Connelly
- Language: English
- Series: Harry Bosch
- Release number: 7
- Genre: Crime, mystery, thriller
- Publisher: Little, Brown and Company
- Publication date: November 8, 2000
- Publication place: United States
- Media type: Print (hardcover, paperback)
- Pages: 418
- ISBN: 0-316-15407-5
- OCLC: 43903575
- Dewey Decimal: 813/.54 21
- LC Class: PS3553.O51165 D37 2001
- Preceded by: Angels Flight
- Followed by: City of Bones

A Darkness More Than Night is a crime thriller novel, and the tenth novel by American author Michael Connelly; it is the seventh featuring the Los Angeles detective Hieronymus "Harry" Bosch, and the second featuring FBI profiler Terry McCaleb, with reporter Jack McEvoy (The Poet) also serving in a supporting role, and was first published in November 8, 2000.

The novel (along with The Black Echo) formed the basis for the 2017 third season of Bosch, starring Titus Welliver as Bosch.

== Plot ==
Terry McCaleb now lives on Catalina Island with his wife, Graciela, his step-son, and their infant daughter, Cielo. After retiring from the FBI following a heart transplant, he operates a charter fishing business. His quiet life is interrupted when sheriff's deputy Jaye Winston asks him to examine the death of Edward Gunn, a former suspect in a prostitute's killing.

Gunn has been bound with baling wire, with a bucket placed over his head and a Latin message attached to his body. The arrangement carries imagery associated with medieval punishment and the paintings of Hieronymus Bosch. McCaleb also notices a plastic owl among the objects at the scene. Because detective Harry Bosch's given name is Hieronymus, the imagery makes McCaleb consider him as a possible suspect.

McCaleb examines Bosch's past dealings with Gunn and finds enough material to question whether Bosch could have killed him. The possibility troubles McCaleb because he has previously respected Bosch and knows his reputation as a LAPD detective. His assessment raises the prospect that Bosch may have acted outside normal police procedure.

At the same time, Bosch is testifying in the trial of Hollywood director David Storey. Storey is accused of killing actress Veronica Aliso and arranging her death to resemble an accident. Reporter Jack McEvoy is following the trial. Storey's lawyers have reason to attack Bosch's credibility, making the accusation concerning Gunn especially damaging. McCaleb and Winston continue to probe more around Bosch, and he learns of this, and confronts McCaleb.

McCaleb later finds material indicating that Bosch may have been framed. The murderer is Rudy Tafero, a former police officer who now works security for Storey. Rudy killed Gunn in an effort to damage Bosch's standing and weaken the case against Storey.

McCaleb and Winston find a surveillance recording with evidence identifying the person responsible for Gunn's death. The recording itself is being erased, so there is no usable copy, just a parking ticket which doesn't carry enough weight. Their investigation nevertheless causes Rudy to act.

Rudy attacks McCaleb, trying to suffocate him same way as Gunn, and then blame Bosch. Bosch arrives and intervenes. During the confrontation, McCaleb kills Rudy's younger brother, Jesse, and Bosch takes Rudy into custody. Rudy then agrees to cooperate in exchange for avoiding a more serious charge connected with Jesse's death. His statement places Storey behind the plan to discredit Bosch. Storey accepts responsibility and agrees to plead guilty, allowing the case against him to end, without further Bosch's testimony.

McCaleb, however, notices something troubling after the case is resolved. Bosch was able to arrive at the right place and time because he already knew facts about Rudy's anonymous car that he had not shared. McCaleb concludes that Bosch had concealed part of what he knew. The discovery damages their trust, and McCaleb chooses to distance himself from him.

Bosch is left to consider what has happened and what kind of detective he wants to be. Near the end, he symbolically baptizes himself, marking his intention to begin again.

== Adaptation ==
The events of A Darkness More Than Night (along with The Black Echo) were adapted for the 2017 third season of Bosch, starring Titus Welliver as Bosch.

== Awards ==
The novel was nominated for the 2002 Barry Award for "Best Novel".
