= LAPD Special Investigation Section =

Los Angeles police tactical detective unit

Special Investigation Section
- Active: 1965 – present
- Country: United States
- Agency: Los Angeles Police Department
- Type: Tactical detective
- Role: Criminal investigation Surveillance
- Part of: Robbery–Homicide Division
- Headquarters: Unknown office building in Skid Row
- Motto: Silent Professionals
- Common name: "Death Squad"

Structure
- Detectives: 20

Website
- Official website

The Special Investigation Section (SIS), unofficially nicknamed the "Death Squad", is the tactical detective and surveillance unit of the Los Angeles Police Department (LAPD). It is organized under the Robbery–Homicide Division (RHD), a division of the Detective Bureau, itself under the Office of Special Operations. Formed in 1965, the SIS's unconventional tactics and involvement in numerous shootouts and police shootings have elicited considerable controversy.

== History ==
The Special Investigation Section was formed in 1965 as a stakeout unit and the Detective Bureau's equivalent of the Metropolitan Division's then-new SWAT unit, in response to an increase in crimes committed by the same suspects in different locations across the city, which the LAPD was then unable to effectively respond to. The unit's creators, Chief William H. Parker and Chief of Detectives Thad F. Brown, "envisioned a nine-man squad of 'professional witnesses'—police officers who could produce irrefutable evidence against professional criminals by covertly watching them break the law."

Between 1965 and 1992, the SIS was involved in over 50 shootouts, killed between 28 and 34 suspects, and injured dozens more suspects—considered disproportionately high for a police unit—making it the deadliest unit in the LAPD. In several SIS-involved shootings, the suspects that were killed or injured did not fire any shots, were not armed, or were carrying pellet guns. The SIS was involved in the arrests of Muharem Kurbegovic, William Bonin, and Mikhail Markhasev, among others.

One of the SIS's most high-profile incidents was a shootout in Sunland-Tujunga on February 12, 1990. The SIS had been surveilling a group of four suspects wanted for robbing McDonald's restaurants in northwest Los Angeles, and was standing by to catch them as they were robbing a McDonald's in Sunland. When the suspects left the restaurant, SIS detectives blocked their car and, after reportedly spotting a gun, fired 24 shotgun rounds and 11 bullets at the suspects, who fired none in return. Three of the suspects were killed, while one suspect was seriously injured and taken into custody. The suspects were later found to have used pellet guns that were stashed in their car's trunk before detectives confronted them. LAPD and federal investigations did not find any wrongdoing. A civil lawsuit ordered the detectives and then-Chief Daryl Gates to pay $44,000 to the families of the dead suspects, but the fee was ultimately paid by the city government.

Four more suspects were killed across three shootings between 1995 and 1997, prompting federal prosecutors to conduct another investigation into the SIS potential civil rights violations. One shooting in 1997, when a bystander mistaken for a robber had his "entire upper leg destroyed" by a shotgun blast from an SIS detective, led to a federal civil rights lawsuit. Another shooting in 1999, when SIS detectives shot and killed two unarmed robbers running from them, led to the Federal Bureau of Investigation launching an investigation of the unit.

In 2010, SIS detectives shot and killed a Los Angeles Unified School District employee who was being surveilled for connections to a series of check-cashing business robberies, after he pointed a handgun at them while surrounded. In 2013, Chief Charlie Beck permitted an FBI investigation into the SIS and SWAT over allegations that members of the units were illegally selling their handguns. In 2018, a lawsuit was filed against the LAPD a year after SIS detectives shot and killed the "Penny Pincher Bandit", who was wanted for a series of robberies; the lawsuit, filed by the suspect's family, argued the use of lethal force was unnecessary, and suggested that the gun he used in his robberies may not have been real.

== Organization ==
Most information relating to the Special Investigation Section is not publicly disclosed by the LAPD. According to the LAPD's website, the SIS's objective is to "determine if a suspect(s) under surveillance is connected to the crime(s) under investigation, and, if probable cause exists to arrest, to locate and arrest the suspect(s)."

The SIS is part of the Robbery–Homicide Division, though their services are available to any other division or unit that requires surveillance support. The SIS is not headquartered in the LAPD's Police Administration Building with the RHD, and is instead based in an unidentified office building in Skid Row. The SIS consistently maintains a manpower of 20 detectives. The LAPD only selects whom they consider their best and most capable detectives to join the SIS, and only 110 detectives have ever qualified for the SIS over its existence. In 1998, the SIS was said to consist mostly of older men who had other jobs outside the LAPD; at the time, the SIS had no women and few people of color, though plans were made to expand their numbers in the unit.

The SIS was said to have an annual budget of $2 million in 1998 (approximately $3.7 million in 2023), although much more is reportedly spent to defend them in court. The unit averages 45 arrests annually.

=== Tactics ===
Since its formation, the SIS has developed a reputation for their tactics, considered unconventional in law enforcement.

The SIS can surveil suspects for lengthy periods of time, reportedly for weeks on end, with some stakeouts continuing well after the suspects leave the LAPD's jurisdiction or even the state of California. Many of the SIS's stakeouts do not result in arrests, and detectives typically move on to other suspects when it becomes apparent that a surveilled suspect may not actually be a criminal. Though the SIS typically surveils burglars and robbers, they also surveil murderers, kidnappers, sex offenders, and corrupt police officers.

To provide undoubted proof of a suspect's guilt, the SIS surveils suspects as they commit a crime—"standing by" as the crime is committed—then moves to apprehend them when they attempt to leave the scene. Though controversial and criticized for potentially putting people at risk, no civilians or bystanders are known to have been killed by a suspect being surveilled by the SIS. The LAPD states this is effective at stopping "streetwise, career criminals"—as it is easier to prove wrongdoing when a crime is confirmed to have been committed as opposed to charging them with conspiracy or attempt, and intervening could potentially escalate the situation into a standoff—and argues it protects more innocents in the long term. Following a 1988 Los Angeles Times exposé on the SIS's methods, the unit began to shift their tactics to intervene in crimes or arrest suspects before crimes are committed "whenever practical".

During arrests, SIS detectives typically wait for suspects to attempt to leave in a vehicle. They then surround the suspect vehicle with their own vehicles and block it in to immobilize it and ensure suspects cannot exit their vehicle or drive away, a tactic referred to as "the jam". Most of the SIS's shootings occur while the unit is "jamming", but the LAPD states it allows the detectives to choose when and where suspects are arrested, thus minimizing the risk to bystanders. Reportedly, the SIS does not inform other police units of their operations beforehand.

The SIS is known to train special forces, namely Delta Force and U.S. Navy SEALs, in surveillance methods.

=== Equipment ===
During their operations, SIS members wear plainclothes and drive undercover cars. They are issued bulletproof vests, which they only equip shortly before an arrest. The SIS is authorized to carry "any weapon in any caliber previously approved for LAPD use" (such as Kimber, Smith & Wesson, Beretta, and Glock pistols in 9×19mm, .45 ACP, and .40 S&W), but they are known to use the following weaponry:

- Glock 21 and Glock 30S
- Kimber Custom
- Backup guns including the Glock 36, S&W 457, S&W 649, S&W 442, and S&W M&P Bodyguard 380
- Remington 870
- Benelli M4
- M4 carbine
- Heckler & Koch HK416

In 2008, Kimber released the Kimber SIS, an M1911-style pistol designed by SIS detectives for SIS use, with a slightly modified variant sold on the civilian market. Kimber stated that for every $1,000 in profits from the pistol's sales, they would donate $15 to the Los Angeles Police Memorial Foundation. The gun's name caused concerns that the LAPD was involved in its sale; in response, several LAPD officials, including Chief William Bratton, clarified that the LAPD did not profit from sales of the gun and that they had no say in how Kimber chose to market it. The Kimber SIS was discontinued in 2010.

In 2014, the LAPD approved the S.O.Tech Cobra SIS vest for SIS use. SIS detectives assisted in the creation of the vest, which was designed for their specific needs. The Cobra SIS is designed to provide high mobility, can be worn over plainclothes, and can be hung over a car seat when not in use and "quickly pulled on and snapped into place".

== Criticism ==
Stephen Yagman, a civil rights attorney known for his criticism of police misconduct, is especially critical of the SIS, having coined their pejorative nickname of the "Death Squad". Yagman claims they have killed significantly more people than official LAPD counts (over 50 by 1999, contrasting with the LAPD's count of 36), and has repeatedly called for the unit's disbandment. James Fyfe, a criminologist and former New York City Police Department lieutenant, considered the SIS "a very scary group" and criticized them in his 1992 book Above the Law: Police and the Excessive Use of Force.

Criticism of the SIS extends into law enforcement. Within the LAPD, the SIS is viewed as "a fearsome and mysterious bunch", with officers said to spread unsubstantiated rumors that the unit conspires to kill suspects or celebrates shootouts with parties. Other police departments, such as the Los Angeles County Sheriff's Department and the Metropolitan Police Department of the District of Columbia, disapprove of the SIS and their "standing by" tactics, and avoid copying them for their own units. No similar full-time surveillance-only units are known to exist in other major police departments in the U.S.—most that did were disbanded or modified due to violence or resource use concerns—and existing police surveillance units state they would intervene to prevent surveilled suspects from committing a major crime such as robbery or burglary, even if arresting the suspect then would result in lesser charges or sentences.

== Fallen detectives ==
As of 2023, only one SIS member has been killed in the line of duty, as a result of friendly fire.

On March 10, 1980, Detective Curtis C. Hagele was part of an SIS team surveilling a known bank robber at an American Savings and Loan branch in Manhattan Beach, California. The suspect fled into a parking structure where his accomplice's getaway car was parked, and as he exchanged fire with the pursuing SIS team, a detective fired his shotgun at the suspect just as Hagele crossed into his line of fire, mortally wounding him. The suspect was shot and killed by another detective, while the suspect's accomplice was arrested in the getaway car.

== In popular culture ==
The SIS has been depicted in several works of fiction, including the films Extreme Justice, Ambulance, and Dark Blue and the television series The Closer, Major Crimes, Training Day, Bosch, and The Lincoln Lawyer.

== See also ==
- Mobile Task Force (MEK) – similar units in the German State Criminal Police Offices and Federal Criminal Police Office
- Research and Intervention Brigade – similar units in the French National Police
- Special Investigation Team – similar units in Japanese prefectural police
