= Harry Bosch =

Fictional detective created by author Michael Connelly

- Titus Welliver filming Bosch
- First appearance: The Black Echo
- Created by: Michael Connelly
- Portrayed by: Titus Welliver (Bosch, Bosch: Legacy, Ballard); Quinn Welliver (young; Bosch); Eamonn Welliver (young; Bosch: Legacy); Jack Meade-Mullarkey (young; Ballard); Cameron Monaghan (Bosch: Start of Watch)

In-universe information
- Full name: Hieronymus Bosch
- Gender: Male
- Title: Detective III
- Occupation: Detective LAPD, private investigator
- Spouses: Eleanor Wish (divorced, deceased)
- Children: Madeline Bosch (daughter)
- Relatives: J. Michael Haller Sr. (father; deceased); Marjorie Phillips Lowe (mother; deceased); Mickey Haller (half-brother); Hayley Haller (niece)
- Nationality: American

Detective Hieronymus "Harry" Bosch is a fictional character created by American author Michael Connelly. Bosch debuted as the lead character in the 1992 novel The Black Echo, the first in a best-selling police procedural series now numbering 25 novels (with a 26th, The Hollow, to be published November 2026).

The novels are more or less coincident in timeframe with the year in which they were published. Harry, as he is commonly known by his associates, is a veteran police homicide detective with the Los Angeles Police Department. He was named after the 15th-century Dutch artist Hieronymus Bosch.

Titus Welliver portrayed the title character from 2015 to 2021 in Bosch, a television series adapted from the novels, as well as the spin-off series Bosch: Legacy and Ballard. Cameron Monaghan will play the character in the prequel series Bosch: Start of Watch.

== Biography (book character) ==
=== Background ===
Bosch's mother was a prostitute in Hollywood who was murdered on October 28, 1961, when Bosch was 11 years old. His father, whom he met later in life, was Mickey Haller Sr., a prominent defense attorney known for representing mobster Mickey Cohen, among other clients.

Bosch spent his youth in various orphanages and youth halls, and with the occasional foster family. When he learned of his mother's murder, Bosch, then living at a youth hall, dived to the bottom of a pool, screamed until he ran out of air, and then swam back to the surface. This event is referred to in several Bosch novels.

He joined the United States Army at age 17, after getting his foster father to sign the enlistment papers. In Vietnam, Bosch was a "tunnel rat" (nicknamed "Hari Kari Bosch"), with the 1st Infantry Division—a specialized soldier whose job it was to go into the maze of tunnels used as barracks, hospitals, and on some occasions, morgues, by the Vietcong and North Vietnamese Army. While in the enemy tunnels, the Tunnel Rats would kill enemy soldiers they encountered, gather documents for analysis by military intelligence, and then plant C-4 high explosive charges that they would set to detonate after they exited the tunnels. Once, while on R&R leave in Hawaii, Bosch went AWOL, but returned to his unit and served two tours of duty in Vietnam. He was awarded the Distinguished Service Medal (U.S. Army) which can briefly be seen in Bosch season four episode 10, kept in a small wooden box alongside his passport and a LAPD Marksmanship Badge.

In both the books and the television show, Bosch has a daughter named Madeline "Maddie" Bosch with his ex-wife Eleanor Wish, a FBI agent who pleaded guilty and went to prison in the first book (complex relationship afterwards). Maddie spent most of her time with her mother in Hong Kong, where Eleanor was a professional gambler and star attraction at a Macau casino. Bosch saw his daughter in person only twice a year.

Eleanor had a personal security guard, Sun Yee, who was also her boyfriend. Eleanor was later killed during an attempt to rescue Maddie from Chinese thugs, detailed in 9 Dragons. Subsequently, Maddie lived with her father in Los Angeles.

=== LAPD career ===
After his return from Vietnam and an honorable discharge from the Army, Bosch joined the LAPD and rose to the rank of Detective III, a position which entails both investigative and supervisory duties.

While in the LAPD, Bosch worked in the prestigious Robbery Homicide Division for five years but was drummed out by an Internal Affairs investigation involving Bosch's shooting of a suspect (The Dollmaker) who was later linked to nine murders. Following the investigation, which was conducted by Detectives Pierce Lewis and Don Clarke, Bosch was sent to Hollywood Division and assigned to the Homicide desk. (Lewis and Clarke also investigated Bosch in The Black Echo.)

At one point, Bosch left the LAPD and worked as a private investigator for three years. He left retirement and returned to the LAPD at the conclusion of The Narrows. After his return, Bosch was assigned to Robbery-Homicide's Open-Unsolved Unit, a cold case squad. Bosch transferred out of Open-Unsolved and into Homicide Special during the time between Echo Park and The Overlook.

During his time in the LAPD as covered in the novels, Bosch was in Hollywood Homicide and worked with Frankie Sheehan (Bosch's partner in Robbery-Homicide, who was later murdered in Angels Flight), Jerry Edgar (his longest-serving partner), and Kizmin "Kiz" Rider, the other members of Bosch's team in Hollywood Homicide.

In The Closers, Bosch was once again partnered with Rider, while Edgar remained in Hollywood Homicide. Bosch remained partnered with Rider until her transfer to the Chief's office after being shot during Echo Park.

During The Overlook, Bosch was partnered with Detective Ignacio "Iggy" Ferras, a younger detective with whom Bosch had not yet developed a solid rapport. In The Brass Verdict, which is told from Mickey Haller's perspective, he and his partner investigate the murder of a lawyer whose practice Mickey inherited, and Mickey realizes at the end that he and Bosch are half-brothers, though Bosch has known this since returning from Vietnam. In 9 Dragons, following them getting shot in The Overlook, Ferras now prefers to stay in the office and do the paperwork as much as possible. In the end, after Ferras attempts to defy Bosch and arrest the killer alone, he is killed, upsetting Bosch. In The Drop and The Black Box he is part of the Open-Unsolved Unit, which mainly works old unsolved cases using new methods, and is partnered with Detective David Chu. He is also partnered with Chu in The Reversal, which is told from the perspectives of both him and Mickey Haller, who is appointed Special Prosecutor against a man accused of murder of a child given a retrial. Both Bosch and Haller believe the man is guilty. In the short story Switchblade, during his time in this unit, he also investigated a murder by himself, which led to a homophobic man already in prison for a different, nearly identical murder. This led him to briefly encounter Haller again in The Gods of Guilt, in which the man he investigated was used as a hitman in an attempt to kill Haller's client.

Not a stranger to being second-guessed, Bosch gets investigated by the LAPD's IAD multiple times and is always cleared. In The Burning Room, he is partnered with a young detective named Lucia Soto. Their unit's commander suspends Bosch for a minor violation of departmental procedure after Soto and he cleared a tough homicide case. Bosch is forced to take retirement even though the disciplinary case against him is eventually dropped.

=== Post LAPD career ===
In The Crossing, Bosch works as a criminal defense investigator for his half-brother Mickey Haller. Bosch's work helps Haller clear an innocent man who was wrongfully prosecuted for a crime that he did not commit. Although glad to help clear the man's name, Bosch did not enjoy working for the defense during the trial and decides to try something else.

He continues to work as a private investigator in The Wrong Side of Goodbye. He investigates the matter of locating the heir to the estate of a dying billionaire. He also accepts a position as a reserve officer working for the city of San Fernando, California Police Department. The chief of the San Fernando P.D. hires Bosch to work as a detective to benefit from Bosch's years of experience with the LAPD.

Bosch is partnered with Detective Bella Lourdes, and the pair solve a case involving a series of violent rapes. In Two Kinds of Truth, Bosch continues to work as a Detective for the SFPD. He helps clear a double homicide case involving the trafficking of illegal prescription painkilling pharmaceuticals. He also clears his name of wrongdoing in an old LAPD homicide case of his.

Dark Sacred Night sees Bosch pushed to his personal and professional limits. During the events of Two Kinds of Truth, he meets an oxycodone addict named Elizabeth Clayton. He takes her into his home to help rehabilitate her, promising to investigate the unsolved murder of her daughter Daisy. He fulfills this promise in Dark Sacred Night with the help of LAPD detective Renée Ballard (first introduced in Connelly's 2017 novel The Late Show), but Elizabeth relapses and ultimately overdoses—which is implied to be suicide—and Bosch struggles with the knowledge that Elizabeth's sobriety meant that she was constantly reminded of her daughter's death.

Meanwhile, Bosch investigates the cold case murder of a gangster in San Fernando which spirals out of control when a confidential informant is murdered. When the informant's killer is identified, Bosch realises the SFPD detective Oscar Luzon has undisclosed connections to the killer. Bosch engineers an interrogation, but Luzon attempts suicide and winds up comatose. Bosch accepts responsibility to protect Bella Lourdes, knowing that it will cost him a job.

These pressures come to a head when Bosch and Ballard confront Daisy Clayton's killer and coerce a confession out of him. Bosch then tips off the grieving, Mafia-connected father of another victim about the killer's location. He ultimately relents and alerts the LAPD, but once again faces an uncertain future.

In The Night Fire, Bosch is once again pushed to his limits. He is informed that he has contracted chronic myeloid leukemia from his exposure to radiation in The Overlook, and has also been working as the investigator for his half brother once again (due to Cisco having to undergo an appendectomy). After Haller gets his client off for murdering a judge, the LAPD detective assigned to the case tells Bosch he has "undone everything he did with the badge". This causes Bosch to investigate other leads in the case to find the true killer, which leads him to a law firm also tied to a case Ballard is currently investigating. Bosch ultimately lets the killer go to save Ballard, but manages to find the killer's exit strategy (though is not present for the arrest).

Meanwhile, after the death of his former partner, who was his mentor when he first became a detective, Bosch is given a murder book by his partner's widow, which he took home after retirement. The murder book details the murder of a drug addicted ex-convict. Upon the widow's request, Bosch investigates the murder with Ballard's help, despite quickly realizing his former partner may not have investigated the case at all. In the end, they solve the case and arrest the killer, but Bosch becomes disillusioned after discovering that his partner took the case not to solve it, but to prevent anyone else from doing so, as he was the father of the victim. In the end, Bosch decides to investigate another murder which his partner had taken records on, and Ballard agrees to help him.

In The Law of Innocence, Bosch, along with a former client, posts bail for Haller after he is arrested for the murder of a client. It is established that Haller successfully sued the LAPD for damages due to Bosch's leukemia, and that Bosch is managing his condition with medication. Bosch and Cisco investigate anyone with a grudge against Haller, leading them to the real killer, who is in a scam involving the FBI, which they reveal to Haller. Bosch also states that he posted Haller's bail because he believes Haller is innocent, not because they are brothers, implying he wouldn't have if he believed Haller was guilty.

In The Dark Hours, a case Ballard is investigating is linked to a cold case Bosch investigated a while ago, leading them to partner up again. He helps with the case, as well as another one involving two rapists. Ballard solves the cases and brings the killers to justice, and Bosch later accompanies her in confronting another man involved in the rapes and getting his confession, before deciding to bring the evidence to the FBI.

In Desert Star, Bosch is readmitted to the LAPD following Ballard being given permission to lead a new Open-Unsolved Unit from a city councilman whose sister's murder is still unsolved. He is told by Ballard that if he works the case of the councilman's sister, he will also be allowed to work a nine-year old case that has eluded him for years, the murder of a family of four, in which he believed the suspect was guilty but was unable to prove anything. He accepts, and quickly finds DNA from the sister's case that leads to another unsolved murder committed by the same killer. With Ballard's help, they find the killer ( a volunteer cop), who attempts to flee when noticing Bosch tailing him. The killer eventually smashes Bosch's car with his own, but Bosch manages to shoot him, which ends with the killer committing suicide to avoid arrest. Bosch is blamed for this, despite DNA evidence proving the killer guilty.

After this, Bosch returns to working the murder of the family, and manages to track the suspect to Florida, eventually finding him. He leaves a note for Maddie in a drawer full of fentanyl, which is implied to be a goodbye, and confronts the killer. The killer admits to the murders, revealing the children begged for their lives, and Bosch stabs him to death in response. The next day, he is found in his hotel room having cleaned up. When Ballard confronts him, he tells her the killer is gone and the victim's family knows justice was done. When she asks about the letter and pills, he admits his leukemia has spread to his bone marrow and is terminal, though does not know how much time he has left, and is considering ending his life when it gets too bad to avoid being a burden on Maddie. When Ballard asks if he wanted to die but changed his mind, he doesn't answer. After he informs Maddie of his diagnosis, he and Ballard scatter the family's ashes. When she asks if he will return to the Open-Unsolved Unit, he tells her he will not.

In Resurrection Walk, due to his and Ballard's actions in the prior novel, his half-brother has managed to prove a man innocent of a murder he was accused of which was actually committed by the serial killer. Due to this, Haller has been receiving requests from many people incarcerated claiming to be innocent, begging for help. Haller has also managed to get Bosch into an experimental drug trial to prolong his life, after finding out about his terminal diagnosis. The drug trial appears to be working, but is reported to have some side effects, including short-term memory loss. To thank Haller, Bosch has been investigating the claims of innocence Haller receives, and eventually finds one from a woman that he believes may be legitimate. He and Haller meet the woman, accused of killing her ex-husband, a sheriff's deputy, and agree to take her case, despite knowing it will be hard because she pleaded guilty. Investigating the case, Bosch discovers that the deputy was part of a clique of sheriff's deputies working with a prison gang, and was involved with the FBI, and notices his close association with another female sheriff's deputy who may have also been involved. His house is also broken into during the investigation and he is forced to wonder if he really just forgot something due to the drug trial. Bosch mentions the connection to the gang in court, despite Haller's ex-wife calling attention to his supposed memory loss. He follows the female deputy, who he has revealed was following the victim the night of the murder, and witnesses her being killed by a man associated with the gang. He pursues the killer, but ends up losing him, though the information he provides, and the case Haller argues, is enough to get the woman's sentence overturned.

In The Waiting, Bosch has been struggling with his medical condition, which has gotten worse, though he is managing it with chemotherapy. His daughter Maddie has decided to join the Open-Unsolved Unit, which he disapproves of, though he lets her follow her own path. He is contacted by Ballard when her badge is stolen, and agrees to help her get it back. The investigation gets them to a fence who is revealed to have sold it to anti-government extremists planning a mass shooting. After contacting the FBI, Bosch poses as a gun seller, and helps them set a trap for the criminals. It doesn't go as planned, as the men are shot, but Bosch discreetly retrieves Ballard's badge from one of their corpses and passes it to her before he is questioned. When video reveals Ballard to have been there, he helps her work out a cover story to hide the fact that she lost her badge at all.

In The Proving Ground, Bosch is mentioned by his half-brother Mickey Haller, and is stated to now also be having heart problems in addition to his medical condition, and is taking blood thinners to deal with it. He is also mentioned to have, along with Ballard, mentored Maddie, who is on her way to becoming a detective.

=== Personal characteristics ===
Bosch lived in a cantilevered house (on stilts) at 7203 Woodrow Wilson Drive in the Hollywood Hills. The money that financed Bosch's upscale home came from his work as a technical advisor for a TV mini-series, in which actor Dan Lacey portrays Bosch in a serial killer case the detective had worked. Bosch's house was later damaged during the Northridge earthquake, shortly before the book The Last Coyote. After his house was condemned and demolished, Bosch had a new one built on the same road, still facing out over the valley.

Bosch has an active love life, with usually one love interest per book. He has a daughter, Madeline ("Maddie"), who, as of 9 Dragons, is living with him. She had formerly lived with her mother, Harry's ex-wife Eleanor Wish (a former FBI agent, ex-convict, and professional poker player, who Bosch met in The Black Echo and married while on a case in Las Vegas). Wish left Bosch in Angels Flight and was killed in Hong Kong in 9 Dragons. Recent stories find Bosch linked in a close relationship with FBI agent Rachel Walling. The liaison formulated in The Narrows and heightened romantically during Echo Park, but Walling broke off the relationship at its conclusion. Walling returned in The Overlook on a strictly professional basis, and she has since resumed a relationship with reporter Jack McEvoy. Walling notes in The Scarecrow that her relationship with Bosch broke up in part because Bosch was still in love with Eleanor Wish.

Bosch is left handed. He is about 5 ft 9 in (1.75 m) and is described as wiry. His muscles are like nylon cords, strength concealed by economy of scale. He has a moustache and brown hair that is graying. It lies in curls.

Bosch's eyes are a key aspect of his appearance; they are brown and nearly black, and were mentioned often for this reason in A Darkness More Than Night. Connelly gives a good clue as to how he visualizes Bosch when, in The Overlook, Rachel Walling tells Bosch: "You look like House" (actor Hugh Laurie).

Bosch is always finding himself in conflict with authority, whether with his lieutenant, or a deputy chief of police (specifically Irvin Irving, Bosch's recurring nemesis until Irving was forced to retire at the end of The Closers and is now a city councilman), or the FBI. His confrontational side is usually attributed to his strong sense of right and wrong, coupled with little regard for his career. At the end of The Overlook, Connelly states this trait can be described in a single word: "relentless". He also uses this word in Lost Light, describing jazz, and implying a self-reference to his own work and personality.

Bosch has a half-brother, Mickey Haller, a Los Angeles attorney who makes his first appearance in the novel The Lincoln Lawyer, although he briefly appears in a flashback in The Black Ice as a boy. Haller is the legitimate son of the attorney who fathered Bosch. In the second Mickey Haller novel, The Brass Verdict, it is revealed that Harry Bosch has known for years of the relationship, but Haller was unaware of it until the end of the book. This book is also the first time the two men properly meet, when Bosch investigates the murder of a lawyer whose practice Haller takes over. In later books they continue to have a relationship, even trying to get their daughters to become friends, but Haller states in The Gods of Guilt that their relationship is still awkward due to not meeting until they were adults.

Bosch's namesake, the Dutch painter Hieronymus Bosch, was famous for his religious portrayal of earthly sins (mostly debauchery) and their violent consequences. In several of the books there are parallels suggested between the Hell in the paintings and the events of the fictional Bosch's life. "Hieronymus" is the Latin form of the male name Jerome, but Connelly has written he used the nickname "Harry" for the character rather than "Jerry" as a tribute to "Dirty" Harry Callahan, the police officer played in a series of films by Clint Eastwood.

Besides the Connelly series, Harry Bosch has made cameo appearances in books by Paula Woods, Joe Gores, and Robert Crais. Likewise, during an October 16, 2008 book-signing in San Mateo, California, to promote The Brass Verdict, Michael Connelly informed the audience that Bosch also appeared in a cameo, without identification, in Connelly's novel Chasing the Dime.

With two exceptions the Bosch novels are narrated in the third-person, initially focused entirely on Bosch's point of view. Later novels include occasional scenes from the perspective of other characters, but the overall emphasis is on Bosch. Lost Light (2003), the first novel in the series in which Bosch works as a private investigator, is narrated in the first-person by Bosch, a nod to private detective novels which are traditionally narrated by the investigator. The Narrows (2004), set during Bosch's temporary LAPD retirement, is also narrated by Bosch, but The Closers (2005) returns to third-person narration.

Bosch is a jazz enthusiast and frequently plays vinyl records through vintage audio equipment. In several episodes in the series, a McIntosh MX110 tuner/pre-amplifier, McIntosh MC240 power amplifier, Marantz 6300 turntable, and Ohm Walsh 4 speakers can be seen.

=== Personal firearms ===
Bosch carries a revolver in The Black Echo (he has to remove spent cartridges to reload during the S&L shootout). In later books, Bosch uses a "Smith & Wesson" or an "auto pistol", probably a Smith & Wesson Model 5906 9mm which was a popular approved-carry weapon in the LAPD at the time; the weapon was approved for carry as an alternative to the standard-issue Beretta 92FS around 1992–93. In The Black Ice he uses a Smith and Wesson .44 as a decoy gun when entering Mexico so that border guards would seize that and not his service weapon, hidden in his tire well. The gun had been a gift from the father of a victim in a previous case, and Bosch never used it because its grips were for right-handed use, while he is left-handed. In Lost Light, after Bosch retired from Homicide and got his PI license, he kept a Glock 27 .40 S&W caliber, semi-automatic, subcompact pistol in his closet for personal protection (mistakenly described in the book as a "Glock P7"). After the North Hollywood shootout, the LAPD authorized officers to carry .45 ACP pistols in lieu of the 9mm. In The Overlook Bosch has transferred to the RHD Special Section and carries a Kimber Ultra Carry II .45 ACP caliber semiautomatic pistol. In The Burning Room, Bosch is carrying a Glock 30, .45 ACP caliber, semi-automatic pistol and using the Kimber as his backup gun. In Dark Sacred Night, Bosch carries a Smith & Wesson Model 15 Combat Masterpiece .38 Special. It is referred to as the revolver he carried as a patrol officer in the past. The S&W Combat Masterpiece was standard issue to LAPD officers from the mid-1970s to 1986, when the Beretta was adopted.

== Appearances ==
=== Novels ===
==== Harry Bosch series ====
#	Novel	Year	Partner and associates	Romantic Interest	Occupational Status	Rank
1	The Black Echo	1992	Det. Jerry 'Jed' Edgar; FBI Special Agent Eleanor Wish	Eleanor Wish	LAPD Hollywood Division	Detective III
2	The Black Ice	1993	Det. Jerry 'Jed' Edgar; Officer Carlos Aguila of the Mexican State Judicial Police	Dr. Theresa Corazon, Sylvia Moore	LAPD Hollywood Division	Detective III
3	The Concrete Blonde	1994	Det. Jerry 'Jed' Edgar; RHD Det. Frankie Sheehan	Sylvia Moore	LAPD Hollywood Division	Detective III
4	The Last Coyote	1995	Carmen Hinojos, LAPD psychologist	Jasmine "Jazz" Corian	-----	On Involuntary Stress Leave from LAPD Hollywood Division
5	Trunk Music	1997	Det. Jerry 'Jed' Edgar; Det. Kizmin 'Kiz' Rider; FBI Special Agent Roy Lindell	Eleanor Wish	LAPD Hollywood Division	Detective III
6	Angels Flight	1999	Det. Jerry 'Jed' Edgar; Det. Kizmin 'Kiz' Rider; IAD Det. John Chastain; FBI Special Agent Roy Lindell	Eleanor Wish	LAPD Hollywood Division	Detective III
7	A Darkness More Than Night	2001	Fmr. FBI Special Agent Terry McCaleb	-----	LAPD Hollywood Division	Detective III
8	City of Bones	2002	Det. Jerry 'Jed' Edgar	Julia Brasher	LAPD Hollywood Division	Detective III
9	Lost Light	2003	FBI Special Agent Roy Lindell; Retired LAPD Detective Lawton 'Law' Cross	Eleanor Wish	LAPD retired	Private Investigator
10	The Narrows	2004	FBI Special Agent Rachel Walling; a sequel from her case with now deceased FBI Special Agent Terry McCaleb in The Poet (1996)	Rachel Walling	LAPD retired	Private Investigator
11	The Closers	2005	Det. Kizmin 'Kiz' Rider	Vicki Landreth	LAPD RHD Open-Unsolved Unit	Detective III
12	Echo Park	2006	Det. Kizmin 'Kiz' Rider; FBI Special Agent Rachel Walling	Rachel Walling	LAPD RHD Open-Unsolved Unit	Detective III
13	The Overlook	2007	Det. Ignacio 'Iggy' Ferras; FBI Special Agent Rachel Walling	Rachel Walling	LAPD RHD Homicide Special Section	Detective III
14	9 Dragons	2009	Det. Ignacio 'Iggy' Ferras; Det. David Chu; Lawyer Michael 'Mickey' Haller	-----	LAPD RHD Homicide Special Section	Detective III
15	The Drop	2011	Det. David Chu	Dr. Hannah Stone	LAPD RHD Open-Unsolved Unit	Detective III
16	The Black Box	2012	Det. David Chu	Dr. Hannah Stone	LAPD RHD Open-Unsolved Unit	Detective III (working on Deferred Retirement Option Plan)
17	The Burning Room	2014	Det. Lucia Soto	Virginia Skinner	LAPD RHD Open-Unsolved Unit	Detective III (working on Deferred Retirement Option Plan)
18	The Crossing	2015	Lawyer Michael 'Mickey' Haller; Det. Lucia Soto	Nancy Mendenhall	LAPD retired	Criminal Defense Investigator
19	The Wrong Side of Goodbye	2016	Det. Bella Lourdes	-----	LAPD retired/Reserve Officer San Fernando PD	Private Investigator
20	Two Kinds of Truth	2017	Medical Board Investigator Jerry 'Jed' Edgar; Det. Bella Lourdes	-----	LAPD retired/Reserve Officer San Fernando PD	-----
21	Dark Sacred Night	2018	Det. Renée Ballard	Elizabeth Clayton	LAPD retired/Reserve Officer San Fernando PD	-----
22	The Night Fire	2019	Lawyer Michael 'Mickey' Haller; Det. Renée Ballard	-----	LAPD retired	Criminal Defense Investigator
23	The Dark Hours	2021	Det. Renée Ballard	-----	LAPD retired	-----
24	Desert Star	2022	Det. Renée Ballard	-----	LAPD retired	-----
25	The Waiting	2024	Det. Renée Ballard, Patrol Officer Maddie Bosch	-----	LAPD retired	-----
26	The Hollow	2026		-----	LAPD retired	-----

==== Mickey Haller series ====
1. The Lincoln Lawyer (2005)
2. The Brass Verdict (2008)
3. The Reversal (2010)
4. The Fifth Witness (2011)
5. The Gods of Guilt (2013)
6. The Law of Innocence (2020)
7. Resurrection Walk (2023)
8. The Proving Ground (2025)

==== Others ====
- Chasing the Dime (2002), unnamed cameo

==== By other writers ====
- Cons, Scams & Grifts, by Joe Gores (2001)
- The Last Detective, by Robert Crais (2003), unnamed cameo
- Strange Bedfellows, by Paula L. Woods (2006)

=== Short stories ===
Collections:

- Suicide Run (2011), collection of 3 short stories:
  "Suicide Run", "Cielo Azul", "One Dollar Jackpot"
- Angle of Investigation (2011), collection of 3 short stories:
  "Christmas Even", "Father's Day", "Angle of Investigation"
- Mulholland Dive (2012), collection of 3 short stories:
  "Cahoots", "Mulholland Dive", "Two-Bagger"

Uncollected short stories:

- "Blue on Black", in Hook, Line & Sinister (2010); with Rachel Walling
- "Blood Washes Off", in The Rich and the Dead (2011)
- "Homicide Special", in The Drop (2011); written exclusively for copies of The Drop sold in Waterstones stores
- "A Fine Mist of Blood", in Vengeance (2012)
- "Switchblade" – an ebook companion to The Gods of Guilt, published on 14 January 2014
- "Red Eye", in "FaceOff" (2014), co-written with Dennis Lehane; with Patrick Kenzie
- "The Crooked Man", in "In the Company of Sherlock Holmes: Stories Inspired by the Holmes Canon" (Nov 2014)
- "Nighthawks", in "In Sunlight or In Shadow: Stories Inspired by the Paintings of Edward Hopper" (Dec 2016)
- "The Guardian", in "Tampa Bay Noir" (Aug 2020)

== Television series ==
In February 2015, Amazon Prime premiered the series Bosch, based on the novels. The seventh season series stars Titus Welliver as Harry Bosch, and co-stars Amy Aquino as Bosch's superior officer Lieutenant II Grace Billets and Jamie Hector as his partner Det. Jerry Edgar. Henrik Bastin of Fabrik Entertainment produced, and Jim McKay directed. The series follows Bosch "as he pursues the killer of a 12-year-old boy while standing trial in federal court on accusations that he murdered a suspected serial killer in cold blood."

According to Connelly, a number of changes were made "to the world of Harry Bosch ... in making the shift from page to screen". For example, in the television series, Bosch is born nearly 20 years later than in the novels, so that events can happen in the present day time, as they once did in the books. Also in the television series, Harry "is 47 years old and a veteran of the first Gulf War in 1991, where he was part of a Special Forces team that cleared tunnels. He has now been a police officer for twenty years with a one-year exception when he re-upped with the Army after 9/11, as many LAPD officers did. He came back to the force after serving in Afghanistan and again encountering tunnel warfare."

In the TV series, Bosch carries Kimber Custom TLE II .45 ACP caliber semi-automatic pistol as his duty weapon.

A sequel series/revival, Bosch: Legacy, premiered in May 2022, concluding in 2025 after three seasons. Welliver returned as Bosch, who has retired from the LAPD and become a private investigator, whilst his daughter Maddie (Madison Lintz) begins her own career on the force.

Welliver makes guest appearances as Bosch in Ballard, a spin-off series which centres on Renée Ballard.

In the first season of the Netflix television series The Lincoln Lawyer (2022), featuring Manuel Garcia-Rulfo as Bosch' half-brother defense attorney Mickey Haller and adapting The Brass Verdict, Bosch's role from the novel is adapted to the characters of Cisco (portrayed by Angus Sampson) and Raymond Griggs (portrayed by Ntare Guma Mbaho Mwine), while the role of Haller's long-lost sibling who he meets as an adult is given to the character Artemisia "Emi" Finch (portrayed by Cobie Smulders). Author Michael Connelly has confirmed that the television versions of Bosch and Haller do not live in a shared universe as they do in the books due to rights issues between Netflix and Amazon Studios.

Cameron Monaghan will star as Bosch in the MGM+ prequel series Bosch: Start of Watch, which will depict the character's early career as a uniformed officer.
