= The Drop (Connelly novel) =

2011 novel by Michael Connelly

- First edition
- Author: Michael Connelly
- Language: English
- Series: Harry Bosch
- Release number: 15
- Genre: Crime, mystery, thriller
- Publisher: Little, Brown and Company
- Publication date: November 22, 2011
- Publication place: United States
- Media type: Print (hardback & paperback)
- Pages: 400
- ISBN: 978-0-316-21455-1
- OCLC: 748770483
- Dewey Decimal: 813/.54
- LC Class: PS3553.O51165 D76 2011
- Preceded by: Nine Dragons
- Followed by: The Black Box

The Drop is a crime thriller novel, and the twenty-forth novel by American author Michael Connelly, and the fifteenth novel featuring Los Angeles Police Department (LAPD) detective Harry Bosch. The plot finds Bosch juggling two investigations: one an old cold-case murder that was reactivated by a new lead from DNA evidence, and the other the death of a politically-connected power broker in a fall from a hotel balcony.

The book was published on November 22, 2011 by Little, Brown and Company, the novel was referenced in an October 2010 interview, in which Connelly indicated that he'd like to release "'bookend' novels next year, the second one a Bosch book". Connelly's first novel of 2011 was the Mickey Haller novel The Fifth Witness.

== Plot ==
LAPD detectives Harry Bosch and David Chu are working cold cases in the Open-Unsolved Unit. Based on a new analysis of old physical evidence, they are assigned to investigate the 1989 murder of college student Lily Price. DNA from a blood smear on her body is matched to recently-paroled sex offender Clayton Pell. However, Pell was only eight years old when Price died, all but eliminating him as a suspect and raising the possibility of contamination at the crime lab.

Bosch and Chu track Pell to a halfway house for sex offenders, where they meet therapist Hannah Stone. Due to his experience with sexual homicides, Bosch is initially dismissive of Stone's professional efforts. However, he soon decides Stone's attempts to help offenders reduce their recidivism rate is a worthwhile career. Pell agrees to an interview, reporting that during his childhood his mother dated a man known as "Chill" who sexually abused him and beat him with a belt, accounting for the transfer of his blood to Price's body. Bosch and Stone begin a romantic relationship, much to the approval of Bosch's daughter Maddie. After years of living alone, Bosch has gained custody of Maddie after her mother's death. She demonstrates keen observational skills and expresses an interest in being a police officer.

The Price investigation is sidetracked by the death of attorney George Irving at the Chateau Marmont. The victim is the son of Irvin Irving, formerly Bosch's nemesis at the LAPD and now a member of the Los Angeles City Council. Irvin specifically requests Bosch to take the case because, despite their history, he believes Bosch is a dedicated detective who will find the truth. Due to unusual marks on George's body indicating he had been placed in a choke hold shortly before his death, Bosch initially suspects homicide. He hypothesizes that the death came as part of a scheme to discredit a company that was in competition for a lucrative taxi license. Soon after George took on one taxi company as a client, their competitor faced numerous traffic citations that appeared to have been orchestrated by George. Some of Irvin's political enemies stand to suffer financial losses in the dispute.

Bosch believes a former police officer, who now co-owns a taxi company, sneaked into George's room and committed the murder. Chu leaks details of the case to a Los Angeles Times reporter in a misguided attempt to impress her, enraging Bosch and making him question Chu's integrity. However, additional investigation reveals that George committed suicide. George was assaulted, but it occurred hours before his death; the suspect intended to confront George but discovered his suicide plan and incapacitated him with a choke hold before fleeing the scene. Bosch learns that George's friendship had ended due to his backroom dealings and that he was experiencing depression caused by his failing marriage and his son leaving for college. Irvin refuses to believe Bosch's findings, leading to a showdown between city and police leaders in which Bosch implicates Irvin in the taxi-license scheme and Irvin demands a review of Bosch.

Bosch and Chu return to the Price investigation, identifying "Chill" as Chilton Hardy, Jr., a man with a minor criminal history. Based on Price being strangled with a belt and Pell's abuse account, they think Hardy is a strong suspect for the murder. They track down Hardy's ailing father, who claims to have no idea where his son might be. However, evidence is found that suggests Hardy's father is dead and Hardy Jr. has stolen his identity. Upon arrest, Hardy confesses to the murder along with thirty-six other homicides, photographic evidence of which is soon uncovered.

Learning that Hardy will never be charged for the abuse that he suffered, Pell has himself sent to the same jail where Hardy is being held. As both men are transferred by bus to court for their arraignment hearings, Pell attacks and seriously wounds Hardy. Bosch intuits Pell's scheme and saves Hardy's life, but later wonders if he should have allowed Hardy to die. Bosch receives a warning from his former partner, Kiz Rider, who now works as an assistant to the chief of police: the Hardy case is being delayed until after the city council election as part of an effort to defeat Irvin. Bosch finds such maneuvering distasteful but knows it's part of the job and feels content knowing Hardy will never be free. Bosch and Chu eventually reconcile after the resolution of the case.
