= The Lincoln Lawyer (TV series) =

2022 television series from Netflix

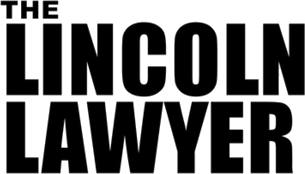
- Genre: Legal drama
- Created by: David E. Kelley
- Based on: The Brass Verdict by Michael Connelly
- Developed by: Ted Humphrey
- Showrunners: Ted Humphrey; Dailyn Rodriguez
- Starring: Manuel Garcia-Rulfo; Neve Campbell; Becki Newton; Jazz Raycole; Angus Sampson; Yaya DaCosta; Cobie Smulders
- Composer: David Buckley
- Country of origin: United States
- Original language: English
- No. of seasons: 4
- No. of episodes: 40

Production
- Executive producers: David E. Kelley; Ted Humphrey; Michael Connelly; Ross Fineman; Dailyn Rodriguez
- Running time: 43–56 minutes
- Production companies: David E. Kelley Productions; Hieronymus Pictures; Algorithm Entertainment; Fineman Entertainment; A+E Studios

Original release
- Network: Netflix
- Release: May 13, 2022 – present

The Lincoln Lawyer is an American legal drama television series created for television by David E. Kelley and developed by Ted Humphrey, based on the books of Michael Connelly. It stars Manuel Garcia-Rulfo as Mickey Haller, a defense attorney in Los Angeles who often works out of a chauffeur-driven Lincoln Navigator. Neve Campbell, Becki Newton, Jazz Raycole, Angus Sampson, and Yaya DaCosta also star.

The first season is based on Connelly's 2008 novel The Brass Verdict, a sequel to his novel The Lincoln Lawyer. It premiered on Netflix on May 13, 2022. It received generally positive reviews from critics. In June 2022, the series was renewed for a second season. It is based upon Connelly's 2011 novel, The Fifth Witness and it streamed in two parts. The first part was released on July 6, 2023, and the second released on August 3. In August 2023, the series was renewed for a third season, based on Connelly's 2013 novel The Gods of Guilt, and was released on October 17, 2024. In January 2025, the series was renewed for a fourth season, based on the sixth book in the series, The Law of Innocence, and released on February 5, 2026. In January 2026, the series was renewed for a fifth and final season, which will be based on the seventh book in the series, Resurrection Walk.

== Premise ==
Lawyer Mickey Haller works in the back of his Lincoln Navigator as he takes on cases in Los Angeles.

In the first season, following a recent recovery from a drug addiction, Mickey is called back into action when he inherits all the cases of a recently murdered colleague. The most prominent of these cases is that of Trevor Elliott, a billionaire video game designer accused of the murder of his wife and her lover. While handling the cases, he hires one of the clients, another recovering drug addict, Izzy Letts, as his driver, and they help each other remain sober. In addition to his career, he also attempts to regain joint custody of his daughter Hayley, who currently lives with her mother, his first ex-wife, prosecutor Maggie McPherson, who he has an on-off relationship with and who is currently prosecuting a human trafficking case while deciding who to support in the upcoming election for District Attorney. Meanwhile, his second ex-wife, Lorna Crane, works for him as his legal aide after dropping out of law school and has a platonic relationship with him, while being engaged to Dennis "Cisco" Wojciechowski, a private investigator employed by Mickey who was formerly part of a motorcycle gang. Throughout the season, Mickey also cooperates with the police as they investigate the murder of his colleague, in addition to struggling with the initial reason for his addiction, Jesus Menendez, a client who he forced to plead guilty despite believing he was innocent.

In the second season, following the events of the first, Mickey's career has recovered while Maggie's has stalled. While finishing the case of Menendez, Mickey meets Lisa Trammell, a chef accused of killing a developer who was trying to take her home and business, and represents her. Lorna and Cisco, as their wedding day approaches, struggle with their own problems, as Lorna is overwhelmed due to having returned to law school and Cisco does one last job for his former gang. Maggie, meanwhile, tries to reestablish her career, and Izzy attempts to open her own business.

In the third season, Mickey represents a digital pimp accused of murdering one of his own former clients, who he believes is innocent. While doing so, he enters a relationship with the prosecutor he went against in the last season, Andrea Freemann. Lorna, meanwhile, finishes law school and becomes a lawyer, while Izzy struggles with her business failing.

In the fourth season, Mickey is charged with the murder of his own client, and defends himself with the aid of his team and Maggie. Lorna, now a lawyer, struggles to establish herself in her new career, while Izzy begins a new relationship.

== Cast and characters ==
=== Main ===
- Manuel Garcia-Rulfo as Mickey Haller, a criminal-defense lawyer and recovering addict.
- Neve Campbell as Maggie McPherson, (Note: In seasons 2–3, Campbell is credited as a series regular in the episodes she appears in. In all other episodes, she is not credited and does not appear.) Mickey's first ex-wife and a criminal prosecutor.
- Becki Newton as Lorna Crane, Mickey's second ex-wife and his legal aide, and later an associate at his law firm.
- Jazz Raycole as Izzy Letts, a former addict and client of Mickey, whom he hires as his personal driver. She later becomes the firm's office manager.
- Angus Sampson as Dennis "Cisco" Wojciechowski, Mickey's friend and go-to investigator, and Lorna's boyfriend, then husband.
- Yaya DaCosta as Andrea "Andy" Freemann, a formidable criminal prosecutor in Trammell's case. She later becomes Mickey's lover (season 3; recurring season 2).
- Cobie Smulders as Artemisia "Emi" Finch, Mickey's half-sister whom Mickey had no knowledge of (season 5; guest season 4).

=== Recurring ===
==== Introduced in season 1 ====
- Ntare Guma Mbaho Mwine as Detective Raymond Griggs (replacing Harry Bosch from the novels), a detective investigating Jerry Vincent's murder case (seasons 1–2)
- Christopher Gorham as Trevor Elliott, a billionaire video game developer suspected of a double murder (season 1)
- LisaGay Hamilton as Judge Mary Holder, the Chief Judge of the Los Angeles Superior Court (season 1)
- Jamie McShane as Detective Lee Lankford, a detective investigating Angelo Soto with Maggie (season 1)
- Reggie Lee as Angelo Soto, a business owner suspected of using slave labor, being prosecuted by Maggie (season 1)
- Carlos Bernard as Robert Cardone, a District Attorney running for re-election (season 1)
- Kim Hawthorne as Janelle Simmons, also running for District Attorney (season 1)
- Michael Graziadei as Jeff Golantz, a Deputy District Attorney and prosecutor in the Trevor Elliott trial (season 1)
- Krista Warner as Hayley Haller, Mickey and Maggie's daughter
- Lamont Thompson as Judge James P. Stanton, the judge presiding over the Trevor Elliott trial (season 1)
- Saul Huezo as Jésus Menendez, an old client of Mickey's, whom Mickey encouraged to plead guilty despite believing he was innocent (seasons 1–2)
- Katrina Rosita as Tanya Cruz, Soto's girlfriend (season 1)
- Heather Mazur as Carol Dubois, an insurance agent who had an affair with Jan Rilz (season 1)
- Mikal Vega as Eli Wyms, a former marine and client of Jerry Vincent (season 1)
- Mike McColl as Glenn McSweeney, Juror Number Seven in the Trevor Elliott trial (season 1)
- Chris Browning as Teddy Vogel, leader of the Road Saints Motorcycle Club (seasons 1–2)
- Shwayze as Terrell Coleman, a client of Mickey's who also seeks his help for his teenage daughter's arrest (seasons 1–2)
- Fiona Rene as Gloria "Glory Days" Dayton, a prostitute and the key witness for Jésus Menendez's case (seasons 1-3)
- Christopher Thornton as Sam Scales, a con man who owes Mickey money because of his repeated arrests (seasons 1-4)
- Marlene Forte as Judge Teresa Medina, the judge presiding over the cases of Kymberly Wagstaff, Eli Wyms, and Lisa Trammell (seasons 1–2)
- Elliott Gould as David "Legal" Siegel, Mickey's mentor and his father's former legal partner (seasons 1-4)
- Paul Urcioli as Jerry Vincent, a lawyer whose practice Mickey inherits (seasons 1, 3)
- Anna Khaja as Dr. Miriam Arslanian, a forensic scientist often called upon for expert witness testimony by Mickey (seasons 1-2, 4)
- Christine Horn as Joanne Giorgetti, a deputy district attorney prosecuting Eli Wyms, also Hayley's soccer coach (season 1)
- Jeff Francisco as Alvin Aquino, a gangster on parole affiliated with Angelo Soto (season 1)

==== Introduced in season 2 ====
- David Clayton Rogers as Russell Lawson, a bankruptcy consultant and new client of Mickey (season 2)
- Lana Parrilla as Lisa Trammell, a chef accused of murdering a real estate developer (seasons 2, 4)
- Clint Carmichael as Mitchell Bondurant, a real estate developer (season 2)
- Matt Angel as Henry Dahl, a true crime podcaster covering Trammell's case (season 2)
- Michael Goorjian as Alex Gazarian / Alex Grant, a contractor affiliated with the Armenian mob (seasons 2, 4)
- Hemky Madera as Agent Felix Vasquez, an FBI agent (seasons 2, 4)
- Darien Sills-Evans as Detective Howard O'Brien, a detective investigating Lisa Trammell (season 2)
- Angélica María as Elena Haller, Mickey's mother, an actress (seasons 2, 4)
- Adam J. Harrington as Jeff Trammell, Lisa Trammell's ex-husband (season 2)
- Ryan W. Garcia as René Morales, an employee of Lisa Trammell (season 2)
- Douglas Bennett as Pete "Kaz" Kazinski, a member of the Road Saints Motorcycle Club (season 2)
- Devon Graye as Julian La Cosse, a pimp and Mickey's client (seasons 2–3)

==== Introduced in season 3 ====
- Allyn Moriyon as Eddie Rojas, Hayley's former babysitter and Mickey's new driver after being accused of carjacking (season 3)
- Holt McCallany as Neil Bishop, a former detective turned DA investigator in Julian La Cosse's case (season 3)
- John Pirruccello as Bill Forsythe, a deputy district attorney and prosecutor in the Julian La Cosse trial (season 3)
- Wole Parks as David Henry Lyons, Julian La Cosse's romantic partner (season 3)
- Merrin Dungey as Judge Regina Turner, the judge presiding over Julian La Cosse's case (season 3)
- Philip Anthony-Rodriguez as Adam Suarez, Andrea Freemann's superior at the District Attorney’s office, later the new District Attorney (seasons 3-4)
- Angie Campbell as Jessica Westfeldt, an intern at Mickey's practice (seasons 3-4)
- Michael Irby as Agent James DeMarco, a DEA agent (season 3)
- Chelsea M. Davis as Vanessa Blake, Andrea Freemann's subordinate at the District Attorney’s office (season 3)
- Lombardo Boyar as Frank Valenzuela, a bail bondsman acquainted with Mickey (seasons 3-4)
- Paul Ben-Victor as Sylvester "Sly" Funaro Sr., a disbarred lawyer in prison for tax evasion (season 3)
- Christian Antidormi as Sylvester "Sly" Funaro Jr., a rookie lawyer (season 3)
- Paul Schulze as Detective Mark Whitten, a detective investigating Julian La Cosse's case (season 3)
- Tania Raymonde as Trina "Trixxx" Rafferty, a prostitute affiliated with Gloria Dayton (season 3)
- Gabriel Hogan as Officer Roy Collins, an LAPD patrol officer (seasons 3-4)
- Wilder Yari as Cat Rogers, a friend of Izzy (season 3)

==== Introduced in season 4 ====
- Constance Zimmer as Dana Berg, a deputy district attorney prosecuting Mickey (season 4)
- Scott Lawrence as Judge Lionel Stone, the judge presiding over Mickey Haller's case (season 4)
- Kyle Richards as Celeste Baker, a new client of Lorna (season 4)
- Jason Butler Harner as Detective Kent Drucker, who is investigating the murder of Sam Scales (season 4)
- Jason O'Mara as Jack Gilroy, an orthopedic surgeon for sports teams and Maggie's new boyfriend (season 4)
- Marcus Henderson as Yannick Bamba, a member of the Crips who guards Mickey in jail and becomes his new driver after being released (season 4)
- Gigi Zumbado as Grace, a forensic video analyst who dates Izzy (season 4)
- Sasha Alexander as FBI Agent Dawn Ruth, Vasquez' partner (season 4)
- Emmanuelle Chriqui as Jeanine Ferrigno, Alex Gazarian's girlfriend and business partner (season 4)
- Javon Johnson as Carter Gates, a new client of Lorna accused of murder (season 4)
- Eddie Yu as Deputy Bennett, a sheriff's deputy assigned to guard Mickey during his trial (season 4)

== Episodes ==
Season	Episodes		Originally released
1	10		May 13, 2022
2	10	5	July 6, 2023
2	10	5	August 3, 2023
3	10		October 17, 2024
4	10		February 5, 2026

=== Season 1 (2022) ===
No. overall	No. in season	Title	Directed by	Written by	Original release date
1	1	"He Rides Again"	Liz Friedlander	David E. Kelley	May 13, 2022
Los Angeles lawyer Jerry Vincent is shot dead in a parking garage, and the killer steals his briefcase. His law practice is transferred to attorney Mickey Haller, supervised by Judge Mary Holder, including the case of Trevor Elliott, a video game designer accused of murdering his wife Lara and her lover. Taking over Jerry's office, Mickey and his paralegal/second ex-wife Lorna Crane refuse to let police detective Raymond Griggs search Jerry's files. Mickey meets Trevor, who is determined to go to trial in one week, and takes the case of Izzy Letts, a former drug addict accused of stealing a necklace. A recovering addict himself, Mickey gets Izzy's charges dropped and hires her as his driver. His first ex-wife, prosecutor Maggie McPherson, is wary as they work toward joint custody of their teenage daughter, Hayley. Mickey hires Lorna's boyfriend, Cisco, as his investigator and they visit Trevor's home, the scene of the murders, where Cisco reveals that he and Lorna are engaged. Mickey convinces Trevor to hire him as his attorney, and he and Izzy discover they are being followed.
2	2	"The Magic Bullet"	Erin Feeley	Ted Humphrey	May 13, 2022
Izzy and Mickey evade the SUV tailing them, which Mickey later sees outside his home. Cisco questions Jerry's investigator, Bruce Carlin, who tells him Jerry took him off Trevor's case. Judge Holder allows Mickey to give Griggs the names of clients who threatened Jerry, and in exchange, Griggs reveals that Jerry frequented a casino. Cisco and Lorna learn that yoga teacher Jan Rilz, Lara's murdered lover, had affairs with multiple clients. Mickey takes over the case of Terrell Coleman, a single father targeted by a jealous police officer, and brings Hayley to work with him, slowly repairing his relationship with Maggie. Lorna discovers that Jerry drafted a motion for a continuance but was killed before he could file it. Trevor is unwilling to jeopardize his company's pending acquisition, forcing Mickey to refuse a continuance from Judge Stanton. Jerry's receptionist, with whom he was having an affair, reveals that he had a "magic bullet" to win Trevor's case. Unbeknownst to Mickey, his car has been bugged by the driver of the mysterious SUV.
3	3	"Momentum"	Erin Feeley	Ted Humphrey	May 13, 2022
Mickey learns he is supposed to represent Eli Wyms, who is not among Jerry's files. Preparing to indict businessman Angelo Soto for trafficking undocumented workers, Maggie is assisted by Lee Lankford, a detective Mickey does not trust. Griggs shows Mickey a surveillance photo of a possible suspect in Jerry's murder, and Cisco discovers Carlin has gone into hiding, and gives Mickey a gun to protect himself. Mickey has the unresponsive Wyms, a veteran sniper arrested for shooting at police, taken off the medication he was given in custody. Lorna questions Carol Dubois, one of Rilz's "clients" who gave him a large investment, and she mentions another client, Neema Shavar. At Jerry's memorial, Lankford taunts Mickey for failing his client Jésus Menendez; tempted to drink, Mickey is saved by Izzy. Soto is arrested, while Trevor reveals to Mickey that he knew about his wife's affair, but maintains his innocence. Mickey realizes that Wyms was arrested hours before Trevor and is somehow Jerry's "magic bullet". In the parking garage, he encounters the man from Griggs' photo, who chases him to the office. Scaring him off with Cisco's gun, Mickey calls Griggs.
4	4	"Chaos Theory"	Bill D'Elia	Chris Downey	May 13, 2022
Mickey deduces that Griggs faked the surveillance photo and "suspect" to test whether Mickey was involved in Jerry's murder, and they plan to draw out the real killer, with Mickey announcing that he has backups of Jerry's stolen files. Soto makes bail, and Maggie's lead witness becomes unwilling to cooperate. Mickey meets Wyms, now coherent, who refuses to tell his story until Mickey gets him released. Seeing Mickey's announcement, Carlin warns him that Jerry's murder is connected to Trevor's case and agrees to meet. Mickey tells Izzy that Jésus Menendez was convicted of killing a prostitute after a witness disappeared. Spooked, Carlin calls off the meeting, and Mickey and Cisco find the bug in Mickey's car, which they leave to avoid tipping off whoever is listening. At Hayley's soccer game, Mickey negotiates a deal for Wyms, but Wyms knows nothing about Trevor's case. Cisco and Lorna track down Carlin, who is pulled over by police and accidentally struck and killed by a passing car. Mickey comforts Maggie after her witness is murdered; they share an intimate moment, and Mickey attends an NA meeting with Izzy.
5	5	"Twelve Lemmings in a Box"	Bill D'Elia	Andi Bushell	May 13, 2022
Despite Trevor's refusal to hire a jury consultant, Mickey enlists Gwen, an expert poker player. Maggie's superior Janelle Simmons is running to unseat district attorney Robert Cardone, and tells her to prove Soto killed her witness or drop the charges. Mickey asks his client Cherry for help finding fellow prostitute Gloria "Glory Days" Dayton, the witness who disappeared after promising to testify for Menendez. Cisco learns that Neema Shavar's ex-husband Anton is the head of a shady security company, and Rilz filed a restraining order against him but failed to appear at the hearing. Despite Lorna's suspicion of Carol Dubois, Cisco approaches Neema and records himself being threatened by Anton. During voir dire, Trevor's actions force Mickey to excuse a favorable juror. Izzy learns her ex-girlfriend is using drugs again, and Mickey is accosted by the Road Saints, Cisco's former biker gang. Lorna encounters a former classmate from law school, which she left behind. Maggie and Lankford approach Tanya Cruz, Soto's pregnant girlfriend, and Maggie refers her to Mickey. Griggs tells Mickey that Jerry withdrew $150,000 the same day Carlin made a delivery, possibly a bribe for Trevor's case.
6	6	"Bent"	David Grossman	Gladys Rodriguez	May 13, 2022
Mickey remembers his late father, a famed L.A. attorney himself, and consults his friend and colleague David "Legal" Siegel. Cisco finds out Mickey is assisting the Road Saints, and he and Lorna confirm that Judge Stanton was not the recipient of Jerry's bribe. Lara's former coworker Sonia Patel tells Mickey that Lara reached out for the first time in years, planning to meet before she was killed. Visiting an embittered Menendez in prison, Mickey admits to Izzy that his failure to help Menendez led to his addiction. Tanya asks for Mickey's help to escape Soto, while Cardone suggests Maggie support him for DA. A comment from Hayley leads Mickey to realize that Jerry's bribe was to buy a juror. He confronts Trevor, who admits that Juror Number Seven is a plant, and that his company is funded by Russian mobsters; he insists that he had nothing to do with the deaths of Lara, Rilz, or Jerry, but Lara was going to divorce him, putting the Russians' money at risk. Mickey remembers his father's words: it is harder to live with losing a case when you know your client is innocent.
7	7	"Lemming Number Seven"	David Grossman	Zach Calig	May 13, 2022
Mickey asks Cisco to investigate Juror Number Seven and the dangerous Russian billionaire apparently funding Trevor's company. Lorna is confronted by Carol, who is convinced of Trevor's guilt. Cooperating with Maggie, Tanya reveals that Soto visits a flower shop just before people disappear or are killed, including Maggie's witness. Lorna breaks up a fight between Hayley and a soccer teammate, learning Hayley is being bullied for her father defending Trevor. In court, Mickey suggests that Rilz was the killer's primary target and Anton Shavar is a possible suspect. Lorna decides to return to law school, and Cisco identifies Juror Number Seven as Glenn McSweeney. Maggie and Lankford connect the flower shop to gang activity, with detectives Winters and Perez identifying a potential hitman. Judge Stanton receives an anonymous letter incriminating Juror Number Seven, who has disappeared, seemingly tipped off. Both Mickey and prosecutor Jeff Golantz refuse a mistrial, and Judge Stanton adjourns court to verify the rest of the jury. Mickey calls in a favor with the Road Saints to watch over Maggie and Hayley.
8	8	"The Magic Bullet Redux"	Alonso Alvarez-Barreda	Justin Peacock	May 13, 2022
Cherry points Mickey to one of Gloria's regular clients, whom Cisco blackmails into getting Gloria to return to Los Angeles. Golantz calls Sonia as a surprise witness, and she describes Lara as a brilliant coder who was isolated by the controlling Trevor, but Mickey casts doubt on her testimony. Simmons pressures Maggie to convict Soto by the end of the week, and Lankford illegally searches the suspected hitman's phone, but finds no definitive evidence. Izzy has reconnected with her drug-abusing ex-girlfriend, and Cisco becomes concerned about Mickey's dealings with the Road Saints. In court, a forensic technician confirms the large amount of gunshot residue found on Trevor's hands, but Mickey realizes that the casino Jerry seemed to frequent is near the vehicle maintenance facility for the county sheriff's department. With testimony from an amateur crime scene videographer, a sheriff's department mechanic, and a ballistics expert, Mickey establishes the "magic bullet": the gunshot residue came from Eli Wyms, transported in the same police vehicle hours before Trevor. Mickey also casts suspicion on Anton Shavar, but Trevor tells Mickey he still wants to testify himself. With Terrell Coleman's help, Mickey rescues Izzy after her ex-girlfriend nearly persuades her to get high.
9	9	"The Uncanny Valley"	Alonso Alvarez-Barreda	Chris Downey and Ryan Hoang Williams	May 13, 2022
Lankford fails to intimidate Soto's hitman into confessing, forcing Maggie to ask Tanya to wear a wire. Mickey reluctantly allows Trevor to take the stand, but faces a crushing cross-examination from Golantz. However, Mickey delivers a compelling closing argument, hinging on the impossibility of Trevor disposing of all evidence in the seven minutes before the police arrived. Cisco discovers that Trevor's Russian mob ties are a lie, leaving them unsure who has been spying on Mickey, but the jury finds Trevor not guilty, upsetting Carol. Mickey apologizes to Wyms for Jerry leaving him in prison, and gives him an affidavit allowing him to sue Jerry's estate for malpractice. With Maggie and Lankford monitoring nearby, Tanya records Soto implicating himself, and he nearly kills her before he is arrested. As Trevor celebrates his acquittal, Mickey confronts him with the truth: Lara was going to reveal herself as the true genius behind Trevor's success, so he killed her and Rilz, disposing of the gun and his bloody clothes with his drone. Trevor taunts Mickey, but claims not to know who has been spying on him. Lured to Griffith Park, Mickey is knocked out by Glenn McSweeney, Juror Number Seven.
10	10	"The Brass Verdict"	David Grossman	Ted Humphrey and Michael Connelly	May 13, 2022
Mickey fights off McSweeney, who falls to his death, and rekindles his relationship with Maggie. Lorna finds Gloria and reveals she dropped out of law school after a professor hit on her. Gloria explains that Detective Perez threatened her into leaving town. Trevor denies sending McSweeney, but is shot dead by Carol. When Soto’s confession is found to be garbled, Maggie asks Lankford to testify he heard it himself. At Menendez's hearing, Gloria testifies to being attacked by the real killer, a man with a distinctive tattoo. Mickey catches Perez lying, and she admits Lankford offered her a promotion to threaten Gloria. This destroys Maggie's case, making her angry with Mickey. Cardone reassigns her to Van Nuys. Cisco offers to settle his debt to the Road Saints himself. Maggie has Soto arrested on federal charges. Mickey deduces that Jerry bribed Judge Holder to tamper with Trevor's jury; she had McSweeney kill Jerry and sent him to kill Mickey, having bugged his car. Holder is arrested. Mickey greets Menendez on his release from prison. Lorna reapplies to law school. Mickey surfs for the first time since the accident that caused his addiction, watched from afar by the man with the tattoo.

=== Season 2 (2023) ===
No. overall	No. in season	Title	Directed by	Written by	Original release date
Part 1
11	1	"The Rules of Professional Conduct"	Rob Seidenglanz	Ted Humphrey	July 6, 2023
Mickey is attacked by two men in a parking garage. Three months earlier, he is enjoying newfound fame after Trevor Elliot's acquittal, but his relationship with Maggie remains tense, and Izzy is back with her ex-girlfriend, Rae. Mickey is hired by Russell Lawson, arrested for breaking into a neighbor's home. The DA reopens the case against Jésus Menendez, with Griggs leading the investigation. Frustrated with her stalled career, Maggie leaves dinner with Mickey, and he meets chef Lisa Trammell, spending the night together. Lisa asks for his help with a restraining order from real estate developer Mitchell Bondurant for protesting his gentrification of her neighborhood. In the Menendez case, Griggs reveals that Jésus disposed of a knife similar to the murder weapon. Mickey successfully argues that Lawson drunkenly entered the wrong house after being roofied. Juggling law school and work, Lorna learns that Professor Wheaton, the instructor who hit on her, is the school's interim dean, and Cisco picks up a Road Saints member, Kaz, from prison, returning him to the gang. Lawson surprises Mickey at home, having staged his arrest to secure Mickey as his attorney, and reveals himself as the real killer in the Menendez case.
12	2	"Obligations"	Rob Seidenglanz	Gladys Rodriguez	July 6, 2023
Trapped by Lawson's attorney-client privilege, Mickey is advised by Legal Siegel to stop representing Menendez. Lawson continues to taunt Mickey, who tries to help Gloria avoid charges for cocaine possession. Izzy wants to open her own dance studio with Rae, and Cisco learns that Gloria's cocaine-dealing client is a high-ranking member of the Tijuana cartel. Mickey offers the client to Maggie to bolster her career, in exchange for dropping the charges against Gloria. Lisa faces increasing pressure from Bondurant, and Lorna confronts Wheaton. The Road Saints' leader, Teddy Vogel, is suspicious of Kaz's early parole, forcing Cisco to investigate whether Kaz is an informant. Mickey tells Griggs he is no longer representing Menendez, but has Gloria provide Griggs with a description of her attacker, Lawson. She is released and returns home, where she is attacked by Lawson but saved by Griggs, who realizes Mickey used Gloria as bait to maintain confidentiality. Gloria tells Mickey she is leaving for Hawaii, and he visits a furious Lawson in jail before informing Menendez his case has finally been dismissed. He gets a call from Lisa, who has been arrested for Bondurant's murder.
13	3	"Conflicts"	Kate Woods	Dailyn Rodriguez	July 6, 2023
Lisa maintains her innocence from jail, but video of her interrogation leaves Mickey concerned. At Lisa's arraignment, Mickey is taunted by prosecutor Andrea Freemann, Maggie's friend, and he provides Lisa with a contract to her life rights to cover her $2 million bail. Lorna confides her worries about Cisco to Izzy, and Lisa is bailed out by Henry Dahl, a true crime podcaster, but Mickey refuses to allow him to produce a series about Lisa. Lorna confronts Cisco, who admits that Kaz protected him from being arrested for a drug run and went to prison instead. Lorna reveals why she initially left law school, causing Cisco to threaten Wheaton. When Hayley overhears Maggie and Freemann discuss Lisa's trial, Mickey threatens to have Freemann removed from the case, forcing her to turn over discovery immediately. He is accosted by Maggie for using Hayley, and she realizes he slept with Lisa. Mickey warns Lisa that their relationship must remain professional, though she pressures him into admitting that he believes she is innocent. As Lisa leaves, Henry watches from afar.
14	4	"Discovery"	Kate Woods	Ryan Hoang Williams	July 6, 2023
Freemann buries Mickey's office in files, and Lorna considers that Lisa may be guilty, suggesting the murder weapon was a hammer missing from Lisa's tool kit. Lisa opens up to Mickey about her ex-husband Jeff, and Mickey's former client Terrell Coleman asks him to help his teenage daughter Angelica, charged with vandalism. Freemann offers a plea deal, which Mickey believes proves there is a flaw in her case, while Cisco questions Walter Kim, a building inspector with a photo of Lisa assaulting Bondurant at a protest, which led to the restraining order. Mickey learns Henry has started the podcast anyway, and Lisa rejects Freemann's deal, while Mickey's team learns that Bondurant lost $200 million on a construction project. Cisco confronts Kaz, who admits he was forced to become an informant after killing a man in prison; Kaz has set the Road Saints up to be arrested, but Cisco declines to join him in witness protection. Mickey turns Angelica's case into a copyright issue, winning her royalties from the plaintiff, and discovers that Bondurant threatened Alex Grant, formerly Alex Gazarian, a contractor connected to the Armenian mob. Freemann tells Mickey her offer has been withdrawn, indicating she has a winning strategy.
15	5	"Suspicious Minds"	Antonio Negret	Zach Calig	July 6, 2023
Mickey continues to have feelings for Lisa, who reluctantly agrees to contact Jeff to help their case. Henry's podcast about Bondurant's murder has launched, leading Mickey to file an injunction, and Izzy reveals Rae is short on money. Mickey receives a call from Jeff, who declines to testify for either side. Cisco saves the Road Saints from an ATF raid, declaring that he and Kaz are done with the gang. Bondurant's receptionist testifies that she saw Lisa approaching Bondurant's building on the day of the murder; Mickey successfully shoots down her testimony, only for Lisa to privately admit she was there. Freemann introduces damning forensic evidence of Bondurant's blood found on Lisa's gardening gloves, but Lisa claims she has been set up. Lorna and Cisco give Kaz a fake identity to start a new life elsewhere, while Mickey learns that Henry has made a deal to turn Lisa's story into a TV series. Unable to find the contract for Lisa's life rights, Mickey takes out his frustration in a phone call to Lorna. Discovering the contract missing from the files in his car, Mickey is beaten unconscious by two men in the parking garage.
Part 2
16	6	"Withdrawal"	Antonio Negret	Matthew J. Lieberman	August 3, 2023
Izzy finds Mickey, and he awakens in the hospital after reliving a childhood memory of his mother. He is visited by Maggie and Hayley, and Izzy reveals that she has broken up with Rae, who was paid to steal the contract. Mickey suspects his attackers were sent by Grant, and asks Cisco to investigate if Henry is connected. He apologizes to Lorna, and they recruit con man Sam Scales to draw Grant out of hiding with the fake sale of a painting, serving Grant a subpoena instead. Maggie and Hayley stay with Mickey as he recovers, finding his father's old law school ring. When Grant attempts to suppress the subpoena, Mickey uses media pressure and Bondurant's threatening email to goad him into agreeing to testify at trial, but Judge Medina tells Mickey he will need further evidence of Grant's involvement. Cisco discovers that Henry's executive producer works for Grant, and Mickey confronts Henry, who admits he stole the contract but denies arranging Mickey's assault. Mickey and Maggie spend a passionate night together, but she reveals she has accepted a promotion in San Diego and cannot continue their on-off relationship.
17	7	"Cui Bono"	Shana Stein	Lisa Quintela	August 3, 2023
An FBI target letter for Grant anonymously arrives on Mickey's doorstep, leading him to consult Legal Siegel. Izzy prepares to rent her new dance studio, and Mickey receives a postcard from Hawaii from Gloria. Lisa's trial begins, and Detective O'Brien delivers convincing testimony for the prosecution, including Lisa's bloody gloves and missing hammer, but mentions a shard of glass found at the crime scene. Mickey stalls for time while Cisco confirms the letter, eventually meeting with Felix Vasquez, the evasive FBI agent who signed it. Izzy cannot afford the newly increased rent on the studio, and Mickey introduces the letter to paint Grant as an alternative suspect. Mickey tells Henry to assure Grant there is no concrete evidence against him, while Freemann calls on Vasquez to testify, but his answers imply the FBI believes Grant is guilty, and Vasquez privately reveals to Mickey that he sent the letter himself. Hayley continues to stay with Mickey, who learns she has a crush on a boy at her riding lessons. Freemann introduces a newly discovered piece of evidence: the murder weapon.
18	8	"Covenants and Stipulations"	Shana Stein	Chris Downey & Michael Connelly	August 3, 2023
Lisa maintains her innocence, but Mickey refuses to let her testify, telling Cisco to find her ex-husband. Mickey asserts that the hammer, suddenly found in a neighboring yard, was planted after the trial began, and cuts off Freemann's case by acknowledging the hammer as Lisa's and the blood as Bondurant's. Hayley and Mickey's team surprise him for his birthday, along with the arrival of his dramatic mother Elena, an actress. He is visited by Jeff Trammell, now willing to testify for money, and sends him away. A disgruntled neighbor testifies about Lisa's violent fights with Jeff, but Mickey reveals that the neighbor lost out on a million-dollar deal due to Lisa's refusal to sell her property to Bondurant. Mickey also introduces video proving Bondurant was the aggressor in the photo taken by Kim, whom Lisa's employee René seems to recognize. Lorna helps Izzy prove she was discriminated against, securing her new studio. Freemann calls on Henry, who provides an interview with Lisa proving she knew where Bondurant parked his car, the scene of his murder. Out of options, Mickey calls Lisa to the stand.
19	9	"The Fifth Witness"	Ted Humphrey	Katy Erin	August 3, 2023
Lisa does well under Mickey's questioning, but Freemann provokes her into an ugly outburst about Jeff. René is called as a character witness, but Freemann confronts him with his past angry social media posts about Lisa. Freemann also casts doubt when Dr. Arslanian, Mickey's forensics expert, uses a mannequin to demonstrate the improbability of Lisa killing the much taller Bondurant. Mickey comforts his mother after she is dropped by her agent, finally inviting her to watch him in court. Lorna presents Mickey's secret strategy to Legal Siegel for a law school assignment: Mickey puts Grant on the stand, painting him as a credible suspect and goading him into invoking his Fifth Amendment rights, preventing Freemann from cross-examining him. He then calls Cisco as a witness, revealing a van owned by Grant's business was outside Bondurant's building at the time of the murder. Vasquez warns Mickey he has displeased the FBI, and Freemann gives her closing statement. René explains that Kim visited Lisa's restaurant posing as a health inspector, giving him access to the hammer and gloves. Mickey realizes Kim was bribed by Grant and equally threatened by Bondurant, but Cisco learns Kim has gone missing.
20	10	"Bury Your Past"	Ben Hernandez Bray	Ted Humphrey & Dailyn Rodriguez	August 3, 2023
Mickey assumes Grant had Kim killed, but delivers a compelling closing argument that Lisa was framed, and she is acquitted. Elena leaves for a film shoot. Cisco discovers that Kim's inspection mirror left the shard near Bondurant's body. Lorna and Cisco lose their wedding venue, Lisa and Mickey give in to their mutual attraction, and Mickey and Freemann settle their differences. Visiting Venice Beach with Hayley, Mickey realizes the truth about Jeff and confronts Lisa: the man he met was her former employee posing as her ex-husband. The real Jeff filed for divorce, jeopardizing Lisa's restaurant, so she killed him and buried him on her property, the reason she refused to sell to Bondurant. Mickey leaves, but Lorna has already called Griggs to investigate. Getting married at city hall, Cisco surprises Lorna with a reception at Izzy's studio, where Lorna reveals her suspicion that Lisa sent the men who attacked Mickey. Nearly hit by a car possibly sent by Grant, Mickey meets with Julian La Cosse, accused of killing Giselle Dallinger; he claims he is innocent and Giselle told him to call Mickey if he ever needed help. Mickey identifies Giselle's body, revealing her to be Gloria Dayton (Glory Days).

=== Season 3 (2024) ===
No. overall	No. in season	Title	Directed by	Written by	Original release date
21	1	"La Culebra"	Alonso Alvarez-Barreda	Ted Humphrey and Dailyn Rodriguez	October 17, 2024
Mickey remembers a case he took as a public defender. Julian admits to Mickey that he and Gloria had a fight the night she was killed, but maintains his innocence. Hearing Legal Siegel had a heart attack, Mickey visits him in the hospital, and considers that the drug dealer who Gloria ratted out, Hector Moya, may have had her killed in retaliation. Finding Lorna and Cisco back from their honeymoon, Mickey is contacted by Hayley, who asks him to help out her old babysitter, Eddie Rojas, accused of carjacking. Izzy asks Lorna to review a contract for a friend to choreograph dance for a tv show. She does, and comforts Izzy over her life having stalled. Cisco discovers there was a fire at Gloria's apartment the night she died. Mickey gets Eddie's charges dropped and hires him as his new driver. Cisco informs Mickey and Lorna that Gloria was strangled, and Mickey agrees to take Julian's case. Later, Mickey discovers a detective he humiliated in the prior case is the DA Investigator for Julian's case, and is informed by Julian's partner David that Julian was hospitalized. Returning home, Mickey discovers his house vandalized, with a snake left on his bed.
22	2	"Special Circumstances"	Alonso Alvarez-Barreda	Gladys Rodríguez	October 17, 2024
Mickey asks Cisco to investigate Gloria's clients, and Lorna to find Moya's record and location. After a case, Mickey runs into Andrea Freemann. He then picks up Siegel, who warns him about the dangers of proceeding with Julian's case. With Izzy's help, Cisco gets the security footage from the hotel where Gloria's last scheduled client didn't arrive. At Julian's bail hearing, the prosecutor, Bill Forsythe, provides evidence that Gloria's cause of death was not strangulation, but smoke inhalation from the fire, and bail is denied. David gives Mickey the contact information for the prostitute who introduced Julian to Gloria, while Lorna gets Moya's information. Lorna tells Mickey that Moya was given a life sentence due to possessing a gun in addition to cocaine, and the contact tells him Gloria was afraid since Menendez' case and said she couldn't call Mickey or "it would all unravel". Julian cuts contact with David. Cisco shows Izzy and Lorna that on the night she was murdered, Gloria was followed by a man wearing a hat whose face is shielded in the security footage, who drove a car whose plate number is unseen. At a restaurant, Mickey runs into Freemann again.
23	3	"Strange Bedfellows"	Antonio Negret	Matthew J. Lieberman	October 17, 2024
Six months later, Mickey and Freemann have a casual relationship. Lorna takes the bar exam. At a hearing attended by David, Mickey shows that Julian was intimidated in the police interview, but Judge Turner does not throw the interview out. Outside the courthouse, Mickey is subpoenaed for a case on Moya, and finds the names of two others involved, James DeMarco, a DEA agent, and Kendall Roberts. Cisco finds the car used by the man following Gloria. Mickey learns from the lawyer who subpoenaed him, Sylvester Funaro Jr., that Moya knew about Gloria ratting him out. Investigating the names, Cisco reveals Gloria and Roberts were once roommates. Roberts denies knowing DeMarco, but mentions another prostitute she and Gloria worked with, Trina 'Trixxx' Rafferty. Freemann offers the victim of a domestic violence case to propose a deal instead of going to trial. Izzy loses business due to a gym offering another dance class. Mickey has Cisco find Trina, who reveals DeMarco pressured Gloria to rat out Moya after planting the gun on him. She gets a call from Funaro Sr., in prison for tax evasion, who threatens Mickey when he answers it. Lorna figures out who the man following Gloria was.
24	4	"Rearview Blind Spots"	Antonio Negret	Lisa Quintela	October 17, 2024
Lorna reveals the man following Gloria was Neil Bishop, the DA Investigator in Julian's case. Mickey asks Cisco to find a connection between Bishop and Moya, and remembers how he met Gloria. He also finds from Freemann that investigators can get themselves assigned to any case, and implies to Bishop he knows about him following Gloria. Freemann approves a furlough for the domestic abuser, and is interrupted from notifying the victim by her boss with news of a possible promotion. Cisco discovers a possible cartel case Bishop investigated ten years prior. Meeting Siegel, Mickey realizes the gap between Moya's case beginning and him being subpoenaed doesn't make sense. Reinvestigating, he finds Roberts' subpoena is fake, and realizes he wasn't the first one subpoenaed, Gloria was. The team realizes Moya, needing Gloria’s testimony to overturn his conviction, didn’t have her killed. They suspect Gloria was killed to prevent her from testifying. Freemann discovers the victim in her case was killed by her abuser. Mickey confronts Funaro Jr. about the fake subpoena. Funaro Jr. admits his father has a cell phone to call out, and agrees to tell him to allow Mickey to visit. In his car, Mickey is confronted by DeMarco.
25	5	"What Happens in Victorville"	Ben Hernandez Bray	Ryan Hoang Williams	October 17, 2024
DeMarco attempts to intimidate Mickey into dropping Julian's case. Mickey tells the others he believes DeMarco killed Gloria to prevent her from testifying about the planted gun. He asks them to find a connection between Bishop and DeMarco, and sends Cisco to Las Vegas to investigate the man who supposedly sold Moya the gun. Lorna finds out the victim in Freemann's case was murdered, and tells Mickey to console her. Freemann becomes more troubled about the case. In Las Vegas, Cisco gets information when he interrogates the dealer's wife. Mickey and Freemann spend the night together and become closer. Lorna reassures Izzy over the way her life has gone. Cisco informs Mickey that DeMarco blackmailed the dealer and his wife to provide testimony. In prison, Funaro Sr. tells Mickey about Moya's relative innocence and how they found Gloria, before sending him to see Moya, who Mickey makes a deal with to get him out of prison. Freemann leaves town, leaving a message for Mickey. Lorna and Izzy discover a case where Bishop and DeMarco crossed paths. Leaving the prison, Mickey and Eddie are run off the road and crash. Mickey gets out of the car, and sees Eddie dead inside.
26	6	"Man on Fire"	Ben Hernandez Bray	Katy Erin	October 17, 2024
Hayley rejects Mickey, blaming him for Eddie's death. Mickey meets Freemann, who commits to their relationship. The next day, he finds Moya has sent a guard to protect him. Freemann admits to her boss that she didn't inform the victim about her abuser's release. Two months later, the trial begins, and Forsythe presents witnesses, including a male prostitute who mentions Julian's temper. Mickey casts doubt on his testimony and shows it was possible to enter the building without being seen by security cameras. Maggie tells Mickey to give Hayley time. Lorna receives her bar exam results and finds she has become a lawyer. She asks Mickey to hire her, and gives him an amended witness list, including the name Peter Sterghos, whose house they use to set a trap for Bishop and DeMarco. Freemann begins prosecuting the domestic abuser. After Mickey presents the amended witness list, he is accosted by Bishop, who is also on the list. Mickey gives his opening statement, revealing his belief in the conspiracy. He later hires Lorna. Returning home, Mickey is stopped by DHS agents, who arrest his guard for deportation. Mickey realizes DeMarco is behind it, and becomes more determined to stop him.
27	7	"Relevance"	Paula Garcés	Dailyn Rodriguez & Isabella A. Rodriguez	October 17, 2024
Mickey finds Hayley has blocked him from her online accounts. He assigns Lorna to her first case, repeat client Sam Scales, arrested for fraud, who mentions a much larger project. In Julian's trial, Mickey reveals Gloria was killed shortly after being subpoenaed for Moya's case. Freemann tells her second chair that she didn't inform the domestic abuse victim about her abuser's release. Forsythe casts doubt on Mickey's case. When Mickey calls Trina, she denies knowing DeMarco, and Judge Turner does not allow DeMarco to be called. Scales, after Lorna gets him released on probation, mentions he will be dead if he doesn't pay back his last investor. Mickey asks Lorna to figure out how to get DeMarco. Freemann gets removed from the domestic violence case after her second chair tells their boss about Freemann not notifying the victim. Freemann vents to Mickey after being taken off the case, but Mickey is unsympathetic after she reveals she told her second chair about it. Discovering the trap has succeeded, Cisco and Lorna show Mickey and Siegel the video recorded at Sterghos' house, of Bishop and DeMarco planting cocaine in the refrigerator. Siegel plans to leave town, and warns Mickey to be careful.
28	8	"Mystery Man"	José Gilberto	Gladys Rodríguez & Jake H. Bernstein	October 17, 2024
Unsure how to use the video, Mickey asks Cisco to sway Trina. Lorna struggles with her new duties as both lawyer and office manager, so Izzy offers to help her. At a hearing, Lorna convinces Judge Turner to order Bishop to testify. Cisco discovers Trina has disappeared. Izzy finds her friend has suffered an injury, and she offers Izzy to take over the job. In court, Mickey suggests the police ignored a connection between Gloria and the DEA, and Lorna uses this to convince the judge to order DeMarco to testify. Cisco finds Trina at Roberts' house, while Lorna finds Izzy has done all the administrative work. The next day, in court, Mickey introduces video showing Gloria was followed the night she was murdered, unnerving Bishop. Izzy tells Mickey she is torn between working for him and continuing to dance. Mickey offers her a job as his office manager. Cisco informs Mickey that DeMarco's subpoena was accepted, and that Trina will not testify until DeMarco is arrested, but she admitted the DEA agent, accompanied by someone other than Bishop, threatened her. The next morning, while being transported from jail to the courthouse, Julian is stabbed by another inmate.
29	9	"Ghosts"	Heather Cappiello	Matthew J. Lieberman	October 17, 2024
Mickey assumes Julian was stabbed to end the case. He finds Julian is alive in critical condition, and converses with hallucinations of Gloria and Eddie which encourage him. Cisco gets the name and record of Julian's attacker. Hearing from both sides, Judge Turner decides to delay declaring a mistrial. Mickey and Freemann come to terms and end their relationship amicably. DeMarco appears to testify, and Judge Turner allows it, without the jury. Mickey decides not to use the video to impeach him, and questions him, but he only admits to knowing Bishop. Mickey has Izzy call and tell him Julian is awake, which delays the ruling on a mistrial. On the way to the hospital, a hallucination of his father tells him to save Julian. Mickey gets into Julian's room with a waiver to continue the case without the defendant present, and presents signed copies of this to the court. David testifies that Julian gave consent to continue the trial, and Judge Turner allows the trial to continue. Freemann gives the records of Julian's attacker to Cisco. Mickey discreetly shows Bishop the incriminating video, and the investigator begs him not to show it. Mickey calls Bishop to the stand.
30	10	"The Gods of Guilt"	Ted Humphrey	Ted Humphrey & Dailyn Rodriguez	October 17, 2024
A flashback shows how Bishop met DeMarco. On the stand, Bishop admits he took the case to monitor it because DeMarco told him to. He reveals he found Gloria and gave her address to DeMarco on his orders, and while waiting for him, Julian showed up and left shortly after, before DeMarco arrived and entered through an unmonitored door. DeMarco, watched by Cisco, tricks him and escapes. Bishop confesses DeMarco bribed him with money for a divorce lawyer in exchange for not solving the case ten years prior, and he was under DeMarco's control afterwards. Bishop then pulls a gun and shoots himself. Later, Mickey persuades Freemann to regain the domestic violence case. Mickey reveals to Julian and David that the charges are dismissed and they can sue for the injuries. Hayley visits Mickey and forgives him. Four months later, Cisco proves that DeMarco works for the Juarez Cartel, and Mickey demands that the city pay a settlement, which they agree to. The team receives a picture of DeMarco's corpse from Moya. Leaving for a vacation, Mickey is arrested by a cop who notices blood coming from his trunk. When the trunk is opened, they see Sam Scales dead inside.

=== Season 4 (2026) ===
No. overall	No. in season	Title	Directed by	Written by	Original release date
31	1	"7211956"	Ted Humphrey	Ted Humphrey & Dailyn Rodriguez	February 5, 2026
Following the discovery of Sam Scales' body in his trunk, Mickey is arrested and held without bail at the Twin Towers Correctional Facility, facing murder charges. Despite the risks, he insists on representing himself and refuses to waive his right to a speedy trial. While incarcerated, Mickey pays an inmate named Bamba for protection. Cisco investigates people with a grudge against Mickey, but finds no leads on who could have framed him. Lorna struggles to keep the firm's remaining clients from fleeing due to the scandal, and manages to get a new client for a divorce case, Celeste. When Hayley visits, she is overwhelmed by seeing him in prison, leading Mickey to ask Maggie not to bring her again. During a hearing, the original rookie prosecutor is replaced by experienced "Death Row" Dana Berg, but they manage to compel discovery of the footage of his arrest. Izzy, trying to become a licensed paralegal, meets a classmate, Grace. Lorna, using advice from Maggie, gets the footage of the arrest, and she and Cisco discover that the officer received a text message and started his car to follow Mickey before noticing his car was missing its license plate.
32	2	"Baja"	Ted Humphrey	Matthew J. Lieberman	February 5, 2026
Izzy and Grace start a relationship. Mickey offers Bamba a job outside jail. Cisco and Lorna show Mickey the incriminating footage. In a preliminary hearing, Mickey questions the arresting officer, but doesn’t use the evidence, and tells Lorna and Cisco he wants a trial, not a technicality, to ensure his total exoneration. Cisco has Izzy get Sam's toxicology report from the crime lab. Lorna asks Maggie to be a character witness for Mickey after revealing his plan. Suspecting his calls to his lawyer, Lorna, are being monitored, Mickey records a fake escape plan to Baja, Mexico. When Berg presents this information to argue Mickey is a flight risk, he reveals the recording, proving misconduct by the sheriff's deputies at the jail; Judge Stone grants Mickey bail. Lorna handles Celeste’s divorce, using insurance loopholes to help her outmaneuver her husband. Maggie returns to San Diego, meeting her new boyfriend, surgeon Jack Gilroy. Reviewing the evidence, the team discovers Sam had a wallet which was not in discovery, and may contain important information. Mickey and Izzy go to get an ankle monitor. Leaving, they find the Lincoln has been seized. Mickey realizes the Sheriff's Department intend to sabotage his case.
33	3	"Forty Hours"	Antonio Negret	Gladys Rodriguez	February 5, 2026
At the courthouse, Mickey finds out from Lorna that Cisco is in Arizona, and they encounter Bamba, released from jail, who Mickey offers to hire as his new driver. During a hearing, Mickey shows the pictures revealing that detective Kent Drucker has lost Sam's wallet, adding to the illegalities propagated by the prosecution's team. During a break, Mickey and Lorna return to the office, where Mickey and Jack awkwardly meet, while Lorna asks Maggie about ways to help her client in the divorce case. In court, Judge Stone admonishes Berg and orders her to find the missing evidence. The next day, Cisco reveals Sam's former cellmate in an Arizona prison may have information, but will only talk to Mickey himself, and Mickey and Lorna persuade Judge Stone to allow him one day to talk to the inmate. Mickey leaves for Arizona, while Lorna meets Celeste, and manages to get a large settlement for her. Meeting Sam's former cellmate, Mickey gets Sam's alias and an address they used to communicate. Leaving the prison, Mickey and Cisco are delayed by Mickey's ankle monitor nearly running out of battery, and barely manage to return to Los Angeles County before the deadline.
34	4	"Bleeding the Beast"	Antonio Negret	Katy Erin	February 5, 2026
Mickey and Cisco investigate the address, finding Sam was researching retrofitting long haul trucks, and the address of a shop. In court, Berg is unable to produce the wallet. Mickey and Izzy investigate the shop, finding a list of clients for it. Lorna gets a new client suing for personal injury, but loses the case due to the client lying, and is comforted by Maggie. Cisco investigates the shop’s client list, finding Sam was likely involved with a biofuel company called Biogreen. Mickey confides his insecurities to Maggie, who encourages him and confronts Berg. Izzy finds a story about biofuel companies scamming the government was shut down by the FBI. Mickey finds out from Maggie that Hayley is being bullied over his trial, and Hayley moves in with her father. Mickey persuades Judge Stone to subpoena the FBI for information on Sam, and Cisco reveals the arresting officer's phone records do not reveal the incriminating text. Mickey and Cisco deliver the subpoena to the FBI. That night, Mickey is visited by two FBI agents, including Felix Vasquez ("Cui Bono"), who threaten him. After they leave, Hayley reveals she recorded the encounter, and Mickey calls Cisco, having figured out the case.
35	5	"You're the One That I Want"	Darren Grant	Matthew J. Lieberman & Isabella A. Rodriguez	February 5, 2026
Mickey suggests to the team that Alex Grant/Gazarian – a target of Vasquez – killed Sam and framed Mickey for revenge over past dealings ("The Fifth Witness"), and they should find a connection between Gazarian and Biogreen. Cisco discovers Biogreen has two co-owners. Mickey calls Dawn Ruth, Vasquez' partner, and sends the video of them threatening him. Cisco connects one co-owner, Jeanine Ferrigno, to a boat at a marina. Izzy finds the other co-owner has been incapacitated since before Biogreen was founded, but knew Gazarian. Grace helps Izzy find that Gazarian and Jeanine went to the same high school, cementing the connection. Bamba helps Mickey, tipped off by Ruth, retrieve a report showing Sam – under an alias – was arrested but handed over to Vasquez, and goes missing. Drucker arrives at Mickey’s home with a warrant for financial statements, causing Lorna to lose another client, referred by Jack. Bamba calls Mickey, revealing he was arrested for parole violation. At dinner with Siegel, Mickey discovers Berg has filed for another hearing, suggesting they intend to revoke his bail. Lorna and Cisco find out about Grace. Lorna confesses her insecurities to Maggie. The next day, Maggie arrives in court, replacing Lorna as Mickey's second chair.
36	6	"50/50"	Darren Grant	Lisa Quintela	February 5, 2026
Maggie persuades Mickey to keep her as his second chair, despite the risk to her reputation. Berg reveals the charges against Mickey have been changed and asks his bail be revoked, but Judge Stone demands further evidence before ruling on the matter. Lorna meets Grace, and reveals she has been given Bamba's case. Siegel advises Lorna on how to handle it. Cisco tracks Jeanine, and finds she is Gazarian's girlfriend, living with him at a hotel, where Cisco is then assaulted by two Armenian men. Izzy and Grace find a video of someone filming Mickey's arrest, and track down the person, getting the video, which shows the arresting officer throwing something into his car before the arrest. In court, Berg has Drucker introduce a letter in which Mickey demanded Sam pay his legal fees, but Maggie casts doubt on his testimony. Lorna gets Bamba a reduced sentence. After Mickey and Maggie share a moment, Hayley arrives at court to see them in trial. Judge Stone decides to either revoke Mickey's bail or delay the trial, letting Mickey choose which. Despite hearing about Siegel's sudden fatal heart attack, Mickey decides to return to jail to prevent his trial from being delayed.
37	7	"Honor Among Thieves"	Dailyn Rodriguez	Gladys Rodriguez & Jake H. Bernstein	February 5, 2026
Still mourning Siegel, Mickey is visited by his mother, who he asks to take Hayley to Mexico for the duration of the trial. Cisco reveals he planted a tracker in Jeanine's car before being assaulted, though Lorna remains upset. Mickey and Maggie discuss exposing Gazarian as having killed Sam. Three weeks later, the trial begins. In jail, Mickey meets Carter Gates, a man charged with murder who claims to be innocent, and refers him to Lorna, who agrees to take his case and talk to a witness. The next day, in court, Berg accuses Mickey of withholding evidence of Sam's alias, but Judge Stone does not sanction him. Cisco leaves to follow Gazarian and Jeanine. After opening statements, they question the arresting officer, introducing the incriminating video to impeach him when he lies about his burner phone, but the officer instead claims the burner phone was to communicate with his mistress. Lorna and Izzy question the witness in Gates' case, who is convinced Gates is guilty. Lorna and Cisco get into an argument over his continued following of Gazarian. That night, in jail, a sheriff's deputy has an inmate instigate a riot, so they can throw Mickey into solitary.
38	8	"Confirmation Bias"	Jennifer Lynch	Ryan Hoang Williams	February 5, 2026
Following the riot, the county sheriff tells Judge Stone he cannot protect Mickey in jail. Mickey is released and placed under house arrest for the duration of the trial. Cisco reconciles with Lorna, and Izzy finds the killer in Gates' case knew where the security camera was. In court, Berg calls witnesses, including Mickey’s former intern Jessica, but Maggie casts doubt on their testimonies. In Gates' case, a former police officer claims the victim said Gates' name right before dying. Izzy asks an environmental scientist to help their case. That night, at dinner with Mickey, Maggie ignores a call from Jack. The next day, Cisco follows Gazarian and Jeanine to another hotel. In court, Berg questions Drucker about the motive for Sam's murder being money, and he reveals Sam used Mickey's image in a scam, giving another motive for murder. Lorna discredits the witness against Gates, but knows it will not be enough. Cisco approaches Gazarian, who is relieved it is only a subpoena. Lorna realizes how to win Gates' case. Cisco notices the two men who attacked him entering the hotel, and realizes they weren't guarding Gazarian. Immediately afterward, Gazarian falls to his death from his hotel room balcony.
39	9	"October Surprise"	Paula Garces	Matthew J. Lieberman & Audrey Lipsmire	February 5, 2026
Cisco escapes with Jeanine, who he tries to get information from after informing Mickey and Lorna. In court, Berg introduces a surprise witness, Lisa Trammell, who claims Mickey turned her in ("Bury Your Past") because she didn't pay him. That night, they decide how to proceed with the developments. In court, Lisa mentions Gazarian's connections to organized crime, and Maggie impeaches her by proving Mickey was paid and showing threatening letters she wrote. They then question Drucker and the officer who pulled Sam over to confirm Sam was handed over to Vasquez, though Mickey notices Ruth in the galley, and Izzy overhears her telling someone they have a problem. Maggie then calls the environmental scientist, who explains biofuel and how organized crime factions scam the government with it. He also mentions Vasquez and Ruth are investigating these scams. Mickey convinces Judge Stone to issue a bench warrant to force the FBI to testify by admitting his theory. In her murder case, Lorna proves the victim couldn't have said Gates' name, and the charges are dropped. Jeanine admits to Cisco that Gazarian was afraid of his own family. Leaving the courthouse, Mickey is kidnapped by a sheriff's deputy.
40	10	"The Law of Innocence"	Liz Friedlander	Ted Humphrey & Dailyn Rodriguez	February 5, 2026
Mickey is taken to meet Ruth. She refuses to testify, saying their investigation is too important. She admits Sam was their informant on Gazarian, and that Gazarian killed Sam for stealing from him. Jeanine admits the same to Maggie and Cisco, and that Gazarian framed Mickey for the murder in revenge for the loss of his contracting company, but was killed by his family for attracting attention by doing this. Lorna shows Ruth they have Jeanine and claims she will testify, and the FBI interrupts the trial to ask that she not do so. To compromise, the district attorney offers to drop the charges, but Mickey instead demands Berg give a public statement exonerating him and the arresting officer be investigated, which they agree to. Jeanine is put into protective custody. That night, Mickey and Maggie share a moment before she and Hayley leave for San Diego. Maggie admits to Hayley she misses her old life. Mickey later encounters a woman who seems to recognize him. She follows him to his car, and they are attacked by one of Gazarian's killers, but are saved by the FBI. The woman then claims to be his sister, surprising him.

== Production ==
=== Development ===
In 2018, David E. Kelley wrote a spec script for a television series set up at Epix by A&E Studios. When the script failed to move forward, he decided to work on a different project with A&E, ultimately adapting The Lincoln Lawyer after sharing his interests in working on legal dramas. In June 2019, the project was given a series production commitment by CBS. In February 2020, Ted Humphrey came aboard as showrunner and Kiele Sanchez joined the cast as Lorna, with Angus Sampson and Jazz Raycole joining a few weeks later as Cisco and Izzy, respectively. In May 2020, it was reported that the series would not be going forward at CBS due to the COVID-19 pandemic in the United States.

At the time of the decision, which CBS Entertainment President Kelly Kahl called a "tough call", two scripts for the series had been written, with two more in development, and Logan Marshall-Green had been in negotiations to star as main character Mickey Haller. On January 11, 2021, Netflix picked up the series with a 10-episode order, down from the original 13-episode plan, and announced that Manuel Garcia-Rulfo would star as Haller. In February 2021, Neve Campbell and Becki Newton joined the cast, with Raycole and Sampson returning to the series. Christopher Gorham was cast in March. In April, Ntare Guma Mbaho Mwine was cast in a role created specifically for the series, with LisaGay Hamilton, Jamie McShane, and Reggie Lee joining the cast in recurring roles. Krista Warner was cast in May.

On June 14, 2022, Netflix renewed the series for a second season, based on The Fifth Witness. On August 30, 2023, Netflix renewed the series for a third season, based on The Gods of Guilt. On January 21, 2025, Netflix renewed the series for a fourth season with Neve Campbell coming back as a main character. On June 2, 2025, Cobie Smulders was cast to appear on the fourth season finale in an undisclosed role with the possibility of appearing on the fifth season. On January 28, 2026, Netflix renewed the series for a fifth and final season, which will be based on Resurrection Walk.

=== Filming ===
The Lincoln Lawyer began filming in Los Angeles on March 30, 2021. That same day, author Michael Connelly revealed on social media that the COVID-19 pandemic had previously delayed principal photography for around a year. On June 8, 2021, Connelly said in an interview that six out of the ten episodes had been filmed, of which three of them had been edited completely, while also confirming that characters in the Amazon Prime Video series Bosch, including Haller's half-brother Harry Bosch (portrayed by Titus Welliver), would not be making appearances as both shows are from different networks. Filming concluded on August 3, 2021. Notable filming locations included Admiralty Way in Marina del Rey, Spring Street in Downtown Los Angeles, Grand Avenue, the Wilshire Ebell Theatre, and Wilshire Boulevard.

Filming on season 2 was due to begin on October 31, 2022, and run through March 2023. Filming locations for season 2 included the Paseo Club in Valencia, The Cowboy Palace Saloon in Chatsworth, Sixth Street Bridge, and the Los Angeles Equestrian Center.

Filming on season three began on January 18, 2024 and had wrapped by June 2024.

Filming of season four began in early 2025 and had wrapped in mid-2025.

Filming on season five began on March 17, 2026 and concluded on July 15, 2026.

=== Lawsuit ===
In August 2021, A+E Studios subsidiary Frankl & Bob Films II, LLC filed a lawsuit against ViacomCBS for "millions of dollars" in losses after it decided to not move forward with the series the previous year. Citing the company's creation on December 4, 2019, the documents state that "after the merger, ViacomCBS's new leadership, led by George Cheeks had second-guessed CBS Network's decision to enter into the 13-episode series commitment," and that after finding it "was not valuable to ViacomCBS ... Mr. Cheeks and his fellow ViacomCBS executives decided that it would be better for ViacomCBS as a whole if CBS Network breached that commitment." The documents also claim that ViacomCBS rejected the series because the first episode had not been filmed and said "that breach ensured that the series would never make it onto broadcast television."

== Release ==
Television series poster

The first season premiered on Netflix on May 13, 2022. The first 5 episodes of the second season released on July 6, 2023, and the remaining episodes released August 3, 2023. The third season premiered on October 17, 2024. The fourth season premiered on February 5, 2026.

== Reception ==
=== Audience viewership ===
By its first three days of release, the series finished No. 2 on Netflix's weekly ratings. In its first full week of streaming, it was the platform's most-watched English-language series globally, with over 108 million viewing hours, more than three times the second-place show. Between May 8 and June 5, 2022, the series was watched 260.53 million hours globally.

Following its premiere, the series performed strongly in viewership rankings. According to Netflix’s weekly Top 10 data, the first season ranked among the platform’s most-watched English-language television programs globally during its initial release period. The series continued to perform well with subsequent seasons, frequently appearing in Netflix’s global streaming rankings. Critics generally praised the show’s performances, particularly Manuel Garcia-Rulfo’s portrayal of Mickey Haller, as well as its courtroom storytelling and procedural format.

=== Critical response ===
Critical response of The Lincoln Lawyer
Season	Rotten Tomatoes	Metacritic
1	80% (35 reviews)	62 (16 reviews)
2	91% (11 reviews)	59 (5 reviews)
3	100% (10 reviews)	68 (4 reviews)
4	100% (7 reviews)	76 (4 reviews)

For season 1, On the review aggregator website Rotten Tomatoes, 80% of 35 critics' reviews are positive, with an average rating of 6.50/10. The website's consensus reads: "David E. Kelley's adaptation of The Lincoln Lawyer relies too much on quirk to paper over its lack of true novelty, but this is a reliable enough vehicle for fans of legal pulp." Metacritic, which uses a weighted average, assigned a score of 62 out of 100 based on 16 critics, indicating "generally favorable reviews".

For season 2, On the review aggregator website Rotten Tomatoes, 91% of 11 critics' reviews are positive, with an average rating of 5.8/10. Metacritic assigned a score of 59 out of 100 based on 5 critics, indicating "mixed or average reviews".

For season 3, On the review aggregator website Rotten Tomatoes, 100% of 10 critics' reviews are positive, with an average rating of 6.9/10. Metacritic assigned a score of 68 out of 100 based on 4 critics, indicating "generally favorable reviews".

For season 4, On the review aggregator website Rotten Tomatoes, 100% of 7 critics' reviews are positive. Metacritic assigned a score of 76 out of 100 based on 4 critics, indicating "generally favorable reviews".
