= The Hollow (Connelly novel) =

2026 novel by Michael Connelly

- Hardcover edition
- Author: Michael Connelly
- Language: English
- Series: Harry Bosch
- Release number: 26
- Genre: Crime, mystery, thriller
- Publisher: Little, Brown and Company
- Publication date: October 27, 2026
- Publication place: United States
- Media type: Print (hardback & paperback)
- Pages: 352
- ISBN: 978-0-316-56385-7
- OCLC: 1577381628
- Dewey Decimal: 813/.54
- LC Class: PS3553.O51165
- Preceded by: The Waiting

The Hollow is a crime thriller novel, and the forty-third novel by American author Michael Connelly, and the twenty-sixth novel featuring Los Angeles Police Department detective Harry Bosch. The novel follows Bosch as he reopens the unsolved murder of a childhood friend at MacLaren Children's Center, uncovering a violent past and a dangerous predator.

The book was published on October 27, 2026, by Little, Brown and Company.

== Plot ==
A retired LAPD detective Harry Bosch is recovering from knee replacement surgery when he visits a cemetery to meet Gregory Talbot, whom he suspects of killing his estranged wife, Jennifer, twenty-five years earlier. Bosch places flowers at her grave on the anniversary of her death. A recording device hidden inside was installed with help from Renée Ballard and her cold-case unit. Talbot takes the flowers home, where his remarks to his current wife are recorded. Bosch and Ballard believe the conversation may support a homicide case, but its use in court remains uncertain.

Bosch's half-brother, attorney Mickey Haller, brings news of a class-action settlement for former residents of MacLaren Children's Center. Bosch is due about $400,000 for physical and sexual abuse suffered there as a child. He wants records concerning Charles "Chops" Lamb, a boy he knew at MacLaren, rather than regard the payment as enough.

Chops died in 1965, when Bosch was fifteen. His body was found inside a concealed punishment space beneath a staircase, known among children as the hollow. The authorities attributed his death to blunt-force trauma. Bosch believes MacLaren staff concealed the killing and wants to identify whoever was responsible.

The settlement confidentiality rules restrict access to sealed MacLaren files. Bosch uses available documents to trace former residents and staff. He turns to Nikolai Novak, formerly Nick Stokely, a violent ex-resident suspected of killing Chops. Novak has since built a criminal organization.

Assistant United States Attorney Daniel Cutler offers Bosch a place on an FBI task force examining Novak. Bosch agrees to assist while continuing his search for answers about Chops.

Novak possesses stolen Hellfire missiles, possibly intended for foreign buyers. Bosch's efforts to obtain MacLaren records meet federal restrictions. Meanwhile, Bosch and Ballard continue examining Jennifer Talbot's death. Their recording gives them grounds to pursue Talbot, but his defense disputes its admissibility and raises privacy objections.

A raid on a warehouse tied to Novak finds murdered victims and torture equipment. Bosch also finds a metal pipe associated with several killings and an old transistor radio that belonged to Chops.

Novak is arrested, and agents recover the missiles. He reaches a federal agreement by assisting authorities with the weapons case, but the deal does not settle Chops's death or other suspected MacLaren killings.

After six months, Bosch and Ballard visit Novak in federal prison, seeking admissions about old murders and grounds to challenge his agreement. The Jennifer Talbot case advances toward arrests after the recording and court proceedings. Bosch has made progress on both cases, but Novak's deal leaves questions unanswered. He remains committed to Chops, refusing to let the boy's death pass without accountability.

== Release ==
The Hollow is scheduled to be released and publishing date by Little, Brown and Company in the United States on October 27, 2026.

== Reception ==
The Hollow received generally positive reviews from critics. Kirkus Reviews praised Connelly's portrayal of the aging detective, describing the novel as an inspiring return to Bosch's established character. Publishers Weekly described the book as an intriguing but overstuffed installment, praising its exploration of Bosch's childhood and personal history. Booklist praised the novel as a successful return for the character, writing that "Bosch fans will rejoice at this knockout return."
