= The Reversal =

2010 novel by Michael Connelly

- Hardcover edition
- Author: Michael Connelly
- Language: English
- Series: Mickey Haller
- Release number: 3
- Genre: Crime, mystery, thriller
- Publisher: Little, Brown and Company
- Publication date: October 5, 2010
- Publication place: United States
- Media type: Print (hardback & paperback)
- Pages: 389
- ISBN: 978-0-316-06948-9
- OCLC: 548642148
- Dewey Decimal: 813/.54
- LC Class: PS3553.O51165 R48 2010
- Preceded by: The Brass Verdict
- Followed by: The Fifth Witness

The Reversal is a crime thriller novel, and the twenty-second novel by American author Michael Connelly and features the third major appearance of Los Angeles criminal defense attorney Michael "Mickey" Haller. Connelly introduced Haller in his bestselling 2005 novel The Lincoln Lawyer and then paired him with LAPD detective Harry Bosch, his half-brother, in 2008's The Brass Verdict. In 2009's 9 Dragons, Haller was a secondary character as Bosch's personal lawyer. The Reversal was published in the United States on October 5, 2010.

== Plot ==
Mickey Haller, who has become increasingly frustrated in his role as a defense lawyer, agrees to undertake the prosecution role on behalf of the city of Los Angeles in the retrial of convicted kidnapper and killer Jason Jessup. Haller's one condition before accepting the task is that he is permitted to choose his own team; he chooses his ex-wife Maggie McPherson as his co-prosecutor, and his half-brother Harry Bosch as his investigator from the LAPD. The prosecution's case rests largely on the testimony of Sarah Gleason, the elder sister of the victim, Melissa Landy.

The body of 12-year-old Melissa was discovered in 1986, discarded in a dumpster, only a few hours after she was reported missing. Unbeknownst to the killer, her older sister Sarah had been hiding in the garden and had witnessed her abduction. On the day of the murder, she identified Jessup, a tow truck driver, as the man who snatched Melissa from the garden. Thus, Sarah's testimony is essential for establishing the quick police focus on Jessup. However, DNA evidence subsequently showed that a semen stain found on the dress Melissa was wearing, which could not be definitely matched at the time, came not from Jessup but from the girls' stepfather.

Jessup's defense counsel, "Clever Clive" Royce, mounts a media campaign for his client, and it becomes clear that his main motivation is obtaining a sizable compensation payout from the state. Haller's response is to allow bail and have Jessup tailed by police in the hope that he will return to his old habits and provide additional support for the prosecution case. Jessup is soon seen visiting various mountain trails in the Mulholland area, and on one occasion parks his car outside Bosch's house at night. Bosch and Haller, both concerned for their own teenage daughters' safety, theorize that Jessup is a serial killer but are unable to investigate fully for fear of blowing the police's cover and the current trial.

Legal procedures require that the jury is kept unaware of Jessup's original conviction and appeal history. Testimony given in the original trial, where the witness is no longer available because of death or infirmity, has to be read aloud to the jury by Bosch, but the key to the case is still Sarah's account. During direct examination, Sarah admits that the dress Melissa was wearing was actually hers and that her stepfather was raping her, which accounted for the semen stain.

Jessup's defense focuses on presenting the stepfather as the real killer and Jessup as a victim of the family's lies. To undermine Sarah's testimony, because of her history of drug use and prostitution after her sister's murder (though she has since been rehabilitated), Haller concludes that Royce must have a witness who will claim that Sarah had told a different story during her "lost years." Bosch then traces Sarah's junkie ex-lover, Eddie Roman, and finds that he has disappeared, presumably to testify against Sarah. Locating prostitute Sonia Reyes, whose pimp is Roman, Bosch persuades her to enter the courtroom at a crucial moment in Roman's testimony. This causes Roman to alter his testimony and effectively destroys the defense's case.

While anticipating a plea bargain offer from the defense team during a lunch break, Bosch and Haller instead learn that Jessup entered Royce's offices with a gun and killed him, two of his legal team and a policeman. Jessup is now at large, but the police surround and kill him at a hideout under the Santa Monica Pier that had been discovered by Bosch as a result of the police surveillance operation.
