= Proving ground (disambiguation) =

Proving ground is a facility for testing new technologies or tactics. These can be civilian or military.

Proving Ground may also refer to:

- "Proving Ground" (Star Trek: Enterprise), a third-season episode of Star Trek: Enterprise
- "Proving Ground" (Stargate SG-1), a fifth-season episode of Stargate SG-1
- Tony Hawk's Proving Ground, the ninth game in the Tony Hawk's skateboarding series
- Proving Ground, a television series airing on the G4 channel
- "Proving Ground", a song on the 1991 self-titled Widespread Panic album
- Proving Ground, a book by Peter Blauner
- The Proving Ground, 2025 novel by Michael Connelly
- Endgame: Proving Ground, a game by Niantic Labs related to Endgame: The Calling
