= The Lincoln Lawyer =

2005 book by Michael Connelly

- Author: Michael Connelly
- Language: English
- Series: Mickey Haller
- Release number: 1
- Genre: Crime, mystery, thriller
- Publisher: Little, Brown and Company
- Publication date: October 3, 2005
- Publication place: United States
- Media type: Print (hardback & paperback)
- Pages: 404
- ISBN: 0-316-73493-4
- OCLC: 60311867
- Dewey Decimal: 813/.54 22
- LC Class: PS3553.O51165 L56 2005
- Followed by: The Brass Verdict

The Lincoln Lawyer is a crime thriller novel, and the sixteenth novel by American author Michael Connelly. It introduces Los Angeles defense attorney Mickey Haller, half-brother of Connelly's mainstay character Detective Hieronymus "Harry" Bosch.

The book was published on October 3, 2005 by Little, Brown and Company, and won the 2006 Shamus Award and the 2006 Macavity Awards; it was also nominated for the 2006 CWA Ian Fleming Steel Dagger, but lost to Nick Stone's Mr. Clarinet. It was adapted as a 2011 film of the same name, starring Matthew McConaughey. It has also been adapted into a television series starring Manuel Garcia-Rulfo, which premiered in 2022 on Netflix.

== Plot ==
Mickey Haller is a criminal defense attorney in Los Angeles who works out of the back of a chauffeured black Lincoln Town Car. He gets a call from bondsman Fernando Valenzuela about a lucrative client, Louis Ross Roulet, a wealthy Beverly Hills real estate agent who was arrested for assault.

Before meeting Roulet, Haller goes to court for another client, a member of a motorcycle club, and pushes for his pay by acting like he will slow down the trial. Later, bikers from the club stop Haller on the road. Their head man pays him ten thousand dollars to keep going with the case. Haller tells his driver he will say the police plane broke the law by looking into a private yard.

In Van Nuys, Haller meets Roulet, who says the woman, Regina Campo, lied. Haller sees that the prosecutor is his first ex‑wife, Maggie McPherson. He points out a legal mismatch that forces her out, though she shows him a photo of the woman's face before leaving. In court, Haller gets Roulet out on a one million dollar bond. He meets Roulet's mother, Mary Alice Windsor, gets a large pay check, and takes the case. To watch the news, he buys video of the day. He also helps a woman named Gloria in exchange for news on her drug man.

At a meeting, Roulet tells Haller and Raul Levin, Haller's investigator, his account of what happened; He says he met the woman at a bar and she invited him over. When he got there, she hit him from behind. He says he woke up with blood on him and was set up. Levin looks at the police report. It says the woman called 911 and said Roulet beat her and used a knife. It says she hit him with a bottle to get away. Police found a knife with Roulet’s initials on it.

A few short weeks later, Levin finds a video from the bar showing that the woman lied to the police, and she did meet Roulet at the bar. The video also shows a man she was with earlier, a "Mr. X," who is left‑handed, which fits the injuries on her face. Levin also finds that Roulet lied about his past. Roulet says he intended to pay for sex but did not want his mother to know. Haller says the news is needed, because it gives a reason for the woman to sue for money. Haller meets the new prosecutor for the state, Ted Minton. Minton says the report Levin found was a trick. The real report says the knife was custom made. Minton also says a man in jail will say Roulet told him he did it.

Haller asks Roulet about the knife. Roulet says he carries it for safety because his mother was hurt years ago. Haller visits an old client, Jesus Menendez, who is in prison for the killing of Martha Renteria two years ago. Menendez sees a photo of Roulet and says he is the man who was with the woman he was convicted of killing that night.

Haller looks at the old file. The weapon was a knife like Roulet’s. He sees that Roulet is a killer and Menendez did nothing wrong. Haller feels bad for making Menendez take a deal. Then, Raul Levin is killed. Police think Haller did it because his gun was used. The gun belonged to his father. It is gone from his house. Haller sees that Roulet took the gun to set him up and make him stay quiet.

The trial starts with Minton presenting the state's case. Regina Campo tells her story. Haller uses the bar video to show she lied. Mary Windsor says her son carries a knife for safety. Roulet says he did not do it. Minton calls an inmate Roulet met in jail. The man says Roulet told him he hurt the woman and killed a dancer. This is what Haller wanted to happen.

Haller shows the man is a liar. He shows a video that proves the man never spoke to Roulet. He shows the man's lies put a man in prison before. The judge is mad. The state drops the case because they can't provide sufficient evidence anymore as well as facing public scrutiny due to another recent high profile case.

In the hall, police arrest Roulet for murder of Martha Renteria. Haller had called them to watch. Roulet says he will hurt Haller's daughter. Levin had found a parking ticket showing Roulet's car was at the murder scene. But the state lets Roulet go. They say the proof is not enough. Haller gets the motorcycle club to watch his daughters house. That night, Mary Windsor comes to his home and shoots him. She says she killed Levin to protect her son. Haller shoots back and kills her. The police were watching and saw it all.

Five months later, Haller is still recovering. Jesus Menendez is out of prison but has contracted HIV whilst incarcerated. Roulet is going to trial for two deaths.

== Reception ==
The New York Times wrote: "Mastering the [legal thriller] on his first try, Connelly delivers a powerhouse drama fueled by cynicism and driven by a criminal defense lawyer named Michael Haller ('People call me Mickey') who works for the scum of the earth and makes no apologies."

=== Awards ===
The novel received much attention from the mystery community. It won the 2006 Shamus Award and Macavity Award for "Best Novel". It was also nominated in the 2006 Anthony Awards for the same honor.

Additionally, in 2010 it was nominated in the "Best Mystery Novel of the Decade" category of the Barry Awards, although it lost to Stieg Larsson, author of The Girl with the Dragon Tattoo.

== In other media ==
=== Film adaptation ===
The novel was adapted as a 2011 film of the same name, starring Matthew McConaughey as Haller and Marisa Tomei as Maggie McPherson. The film was directed by Brad Furman from a screenplay by John Romano and produced by Stone Village Pictures. Lionsgate holds the US distribution rights, and Lakeshore Entertainment holds international rights.

=== Television series ===
On June 25, 2019, it was announced that David E. Kelley had developed and written a television series based on the Haller series with a commitment from CBS. However, on May 2, 2020, it was announced that the pilot would not be moving forward. Netflix subsequently picked up the series and ordered a 10-episode series of The Lincoln Lawyer, with Kelley, on January 11, 2021. Despite the same name of the eponymous novel, the first season of the series is based on Connelly's second Mickey Haller novel, The Brass Verdict. Filming for the series began on March 31, 2021. On April 6, 2022, the series was given a May 13, 2022, premiere date. It was renewed for a second season in June 2022. Based on the fourth novel in the Haller series, The Fifth Witness, the second season is released in two parts, on July 6, 2023 and August 3, 2023, respectively.
