= The Gods of Guilt =

2013 novel by Michael Connelly

- Hardcover edition
- Author: Michael Connelly
- Language: English
- Series: Mickey Haller
- Release number: 5
- Genre: Crime, mystery, thriller
- Publisher: Little, Brown and Company
- Publication date: November 21, 2013 (United Kingdom and Ireland); December 2, 2013 (United States and Canada)
- Publication place: United States
- Media type: Print (hardback & paperback)
- ISBN: 978-0-316-06951-9
- OCLC: 851566395
- Dewey Decimal: 813/.54
- LC Class: PS3553.O51165 G63 2013
- Preceded by: The Fifth Witness
- Followed by: The Law of Innocence

The Gods of Guilt is a crime thriller novel, and the twenty-sixth novel by American author Michael Connelly and his fifth to feature Los Angeles criminal defense attorney Mickey Haller. The novel follows Haller as he takes on the case of Andre La Cosse, a "digital pimp" who allegedly murdered Gloria Dayton, an old friend of Haller's.

The book was published in the United Kingdom and Ireland on November 21, 2013, and in the United States and Canada on December 2, 2013 by Little, Brown and Company. Connelly's signature character Harry Bosch appears in the book but does not play a major role. The novel is so named because Haller describes members of a jury as "gods of guilt."

== Plot ==
Mickey Haller, a Los Angeles attorney, receives news about Gloria Dayton, a woman he once represented. Gloria has been killed, and Andre La Cosse, an online escort service operator, stands accused of her murder. Andre denies the charge, and Mickey accepts his case. Gloria had kept Mickey's business card for years, showing her trust in him. Her death forces Mickey to reconsider their past encounters and his inability to improve her life.

Mickey works with Lorna Taylor, his former wife, investigator Dennis "Cisco" Wojciechowski, and Jennifer "Legal" Aronson. They examine the prosecution's accusations and the proof against Andre. Mickey learns about Gloria's work and the people who profited from it. He meets Robert "Bob" O'Brien, Milton "Milt" Chambers, Jeff Golantz, Stanley Weisberg, Reggie Campo, Louis Opparizio, and Dennis "Denny" Watson. Their statements raise doubts about Gloria's last days and Andre's alleged crime.

While getting ready for trial, Mickey questions the conduct of law enforcement officers. His inquiries point toward a criminal enterprise that profits from vulnerable women. He also wonders whether his earlier decisions while representing Gloria contributed to her circumstances. These concerns make his duty to Andre harder to separate from his memories of Gloria.

In court, Mickey questions witnesses and disputes the prosecution's accusations. He argues that the charge against Andre rests on unreliable testimony and concealed motives. With help from his colleagues, he reviews each piece of proof and searches for reasons the jury should doubt Andre's guilt. He aims to ensure that his client receives a fair hearing under the law.

The trial carries special meaning for Mickey. He must defend Andre according to his professional duties, but he also wants answers about Gloria's death. He understands that legal representation cannot undo the harm she suffered. Her fate makes him reconsider his duties as an attorney and the effects his decisions may have on others.

Following the trial, the verdict determines Andre's legal future, but Mickey continues to remember Gloria. His experience leaves him considering the limits of the courts and the obligations lawyers bear. He recognizes that fairness, accountability, and sound judgment matter whenever a person's freedom depends on testimony and proof. Gloria's death also reminds him that lawyers' choices can affect lives long after a case has ended.

Through Andre's defense, Mickey faces questions about his past conduct and his duties toward those he represents. His effort to obtain a fair verdict requires patience, careful review, and a willingness to question accepted accounts. The experience reinforces his belief that every accused person deserves a proper hearing, while the truth about a victim's death deserves equal attention. Mickey finishes the trial with a renewed awareness of the burdens attached to his profession and the lasting effects of his decisions.

== TV Series ==
The Mickey Haller series of books was adapted in the Netflix series The Lincoln Lawyer. This book formed the basis of the third season of the TV series.
