= The Brass Verdict =

2008 novel by Michael Connelly

- First edition
- Author: Michael Connelly
- Language: English
- Series: Mickey Haller
- Release number: 2
- Genre: Crime, mystery, thriller
- Publisher: Little, Brown and Company
- Publication date: October 14, 2008
- Publication place: United States
- Media type: Print (hardback & paperback)
- Pages: 422
- ISBN: 0-316-16629-4
- OCLC: 225870367
- Dewey Decimal: 813/.54 22
- LC Class: PS3553.O51165 B73 2008
- Preceded by: The Lincoln Lawyer
- Followed by: The Reversal

The Brass Verdict is a crime thriller novel, and the nineteenth novel by American author Michael Connelly and features the second appearance of Los Angeles criminal defense attorney Michael "Mickey" Haller, as well as the third featuring reporter Jack McEvoy and featuring LAPD detective Harry Bosch. Connelly introduced Haller in his bestselling 2005 novel The Lincoln Lawyer.

The book was published on October 14, 2008 by Little, Brown and Company, and won the 2009 Anthony Award for Best Novel; it was also nominated for the 2009 CWA Ian Fleming Steel Dagger, but lost to John Hart's The Last Child.

== Plot ==
Since the events of the previous novel, attorney Mickey Haller has spent a year recuperating from his wounds and a subsequent addiction to painkillers. He is called back to the practice of law when an old acquaintance, defense attorney Jerry Vincent, is murdered. Haller inherits Vincent's caseload, which includes the high-profile trial of Hollywood mogul Walter Elliott, accused of murdering his wife Mitzi and her German lover. Haller secures this "franchise" case, persuading Elliott to keep him on as counsel by promising not to seek a postponement of the trial, which is due to start in nine days.

Meanwhile, maverick LAPD detective Harry Bosch is investigating Vincent's murder. Bosch, warning that Vincent's killer may come after Haller next, persuades the reluctant lawyer to cooperate in the ongoing investigation. Meanwhile, Haller shakes off lingering self-doubts as he prepares for the double-murder trial. Among the cases he takes on is that of a former surfing champion, Patrick, who, while addicted to painkillers after a surfing accident, has stolen a diamond necklace while at the home of a friend. Haller sympathizes with Patrick and employs the young man to drive his Lincoln. He manages to get Patrick off by playing on a hunch that the stolen diamonds were not genuine.

Assisted by his investigator, Cisco, and his office assistant/ex-wife, Lorna, Haller works out a strategy to defend Elliott, based on the fact that the gunshot residue found on his hands is the result of having travelled in a police car used earlier in the day to transport another prisoner. He also throws doubt as to whether the couple's murderer was actually after Mitzi or her lover. In the meantime, Elliott admits that he is involved with the Mafia and that he believes they murdered both Mitzi and Vincent.

On the strength of Bosch's findings, Haller suspects that Vincent bribed someone in the legal process to plant a juror who would help obtain an acquittal for Elliott, regardless of the evidence. He discovers that one of the jurors has stolen someone else's identity, which results in the trial being halted. Elliott confesses to Haller that he actually did kill Mitzi and her lover. That evening he receives a phone call purportedly from the police, asking him to help a former client. When he arrives at the scene, he is attacked by a man who attempts to push him over a precipice. Bosch and his team, who have been observing Haller, arrive just in time to prevent the murder. The attacker is discovered to be the planted juror.

Haller figures out that the person behind the corruption is in fact a senior judge, and confronts her with his evidence, leading to her arrest by the FBI. When he learns that Walter Elliott and his secretary have also been murdered, he assumes she is behind that murder, but it turns out that justice has been dispensed by the family of Mitzi's lover before their return to Germany. Haller realizes by the end of the book, going mainly on the resemblances between Bosch and his own father (himself a lawyer), that he and Bosch are half-brothers.

== Awards ==
The novel won the 2009 Anthony Award for "Best Novel". It was also nominated for the CWA Ian Fleming Steel Dagger in the same year at the Crime Thriller Awards.

== Television series adaptation ==
On June 25, 2019, it was announced that David E. Kelley had developed and written a television series based on the Haller series with a commitment from CBS. However, on May 2, 2020, it was announced that the pilot would not be moving forward. Netflix subsequently picked up the series and ordered a 10-episode series of The Lincoln Lawyer, with Kelley, on January 11, 2021, based on The Brass Verdict. Filming for the series began on March 31, 2021. On April 6, 2022, the series was given a May 13, 2022 premiere date.
