= Nine Dragons (novel) =

2009 novel by Michael Connelly

- Hardcover edition
- Author: Michael Connelly
- Language: English
- Series: Harry Bosch
- Release number: 14
- Genre: Crime, mystery, thriller
- Publisher: Little, Brown and Company
- Publication date: October 1, 2009 (United Kingdom and Ireland); October 13, 2009 (United States and Canada)
- Publication place: United States
- Media type: Print (hardback & paperback)
- Pages: 544
- ISBN: 978-0-316-07104-8
- OCLC: 426147403
- Dewey Decimal: 813/.54
- LC Class: PS3553.O51165 N56 2009
- Preceded by: The Scarecrow
- Followed by: The Reversal

Nine Dragons is a crime thriller novel, and the twenty-first novel by American author Michael Connelly, and the fourteenth featuring the Los Angeles detective Hieronymus "Harry" Bosch. It was published in the United Kingdom and Ireland on October 1, 2009, and in the United States and Canada on October 13, 2009 by Little, Brown and Company.

The novel is partly set in Hong Kong, where Bosch's daughter Maddie and ex-wife Eleanor Wish are living. The main plot involves Maddie being kidnapped by a Chinese Triad (crime syndicate). Bosch believes this is because he has been investigating a murder in Los Angeles in which his primary suspect is a member of a triad that was shaking down the victim. Bosch heads to Hong Kong in an effort to rescue his daughter. The name of the most populated region of Hong Kong, Kowloon, means "nine dragons".

== Plot ==
During a slow work night, LAPD detective Harry Bosch is asked to investigate a shooting in a "rougher", "Bronx-like" section of Los Angeles. Harry and his partner, Ignacio Ferras, grudgingly take an assignment that would normally be handled by the gang unit and learn that a Chinese-American convenience store owner was murdered behind his own counter. The case draws Bosch's interest because the victim had shown him kindness during an earlier investigation. Bosch assures the owner's son, Robert Li, that he will catch the culprit.

Bosch starts to realize that the supposed robbery was possibly an execution by a Triad hitman. With the help of Detective David Chu of the Asian Gangs Unit, Bosch starts to zero in on a suspect, Bo-Jing Chang, a Triad associate. He soon receives a threatening call telling him to back off.

Initially ignoring the threat, Bosch receives a video showing his daughter Maddie as a captive in Hong Kong, apparently having been kidnapped. He believes this act was related to his investigation. Bosch rushes off to save her, realizing that if he is not back within 48 hours, the suspect in the shooting will be set free. Because of the length of the flights, Harry will have less than 24 hours to find Maddie in Hong Kong.

Upon arriving in Hong Kong, Bosch is aided by Maddie's mother, his ex-wife Eleanor Wish, and her Chinese boyfriend, Sun Yee, who worked on security at the same casino as where Wish plays high stakes cards. Through examination of the video, Bosch and Wish determine which hotel may hold Maddie. However, Wish is killed by thieves who accosted them there.

Bosch and Yee continue the search. They connect the kidnapper to Dennis Ho, owner of North Star Imports, Bosch kills Dennis Ho before he takes Maddie to the shipping boat meant for her and narrowly rescues her from the trunk of Dennis Ho's Mercedes and takes her back to Los Angeles. The Chinese government sends agents to extradite Bosch, but his half-brother, lawyer Mickey Haller, forces the Chinese agents to drop this attempt.

Bosch and Chu determine that there is no connection between Maddie's abduction and the murder investigation. Instead, the evidence points to the son Robert Li and his best friend and assistant manager, Eugene Lam.

Bosch and Chu arrest Lam, leaving Ferras to follow Robert Li. Lam reveals that the murder was a plot concocted by Mia Li, the victim's daughter, to relieve her of the burden of caring for her parents. Robert had thought up disguising the murder as a triad killing.

When Bosch and Chu inform Ferras, he decides to single-handedly arrest Robert as an act of defiance against Bosch. He is instead killed by Mia, who commits suicide.

After Ferras' funeral, Maddie confesses to Bosch that her "kidnapping" was staged with friends to get her mother to agree to let her live with Bosch. But Maddie's accomplice in the scheme made a deal to sell her to the Triad. a fate from which Harry saved her.

Maddie blames herself for the deaths that followed: her mother, her friends and their mother. Harry consoles her, promising to show her how they can make up for their mistakes.
