= The Proving Ground =

2025 novel by Michael Connelly

- Hardcover edition
- Author: Michael Connelly
- Language: English
- Series: Mickey Haller
- Release number: 8
- Genre: Crime, mystery, thriller
- Publisher: Little, Brown and Company
- Publication date: October 21, 2025
- Publication place: United States
- Media type: Print (hardback & paperback)
- Pages: 400
- ISBN: 978-0-316-56382-6
- OCLC: 1534864409
- Dewey Decimal: 813.54
- Preceded by: Resurrection Walk

The Proving Ground is a crime thriller novel, and the forty-first novel by American author Michael Connelly and his eighth to feature Los Angeles criminal defense attorney Mickey Haller. The novel follows Haller as he sues an artificial intelligence company over a chatbot linked to a teenager's murder.

The book was published on October 21, 2025 by Little, Brown and Company.

== Plot ==
Mickey Haller, a Los Angeles criminal defense attorney, now handles civil cases. He represents Brenda Randolph, whose teenage daughter Rebecca was killed by her former boyfriend, Aaron Colton. Brenda accuses Tidalwaiv Technologies of contributing to Rebecca's death through Clair, an artificial-intelligence companion marketed to young users. At a federal hearing, Haller challenges redactions in company records and a bid to bar Rikki Patel, a former employee bound by a nondisclosure agreement. Judge Margaret Ruhlin reserves her rulings.

Writer Jack McEvoy offers research help in exchange for access to the case. Haller asks investigator Dennis "Cisco" Wojciechowski to check him out. He also asks his former wife, District attorney Maggie McPherson, for Aaron's laptop. She refuses because Aaron's juvenile case remains active. Haller leaves an external drive on her desk. Soon, an identical drive containing Aaron's laptop data appears in his unlocked car.

Ruhlin allows Patel to testify but keeps company records redacted. McEvoy reviews them in a secure room. When Patel stops answering calls, Haller and Cisco visit his Venice bungalow and find him dead from an apparent OxyContin overdose. Haller presses police to examine the death. At a hearing, defense attorney Marcus Mason admits Patel had been watched.

McEvoy spots one name repeatedly removed from internal emails: Naomi Kitchens, a former Project Clair ethicist. Haller and McEvoy visit her at Stanford. She fears Tidalwaiv is monitoring her. Haller warns that the company may blame her for its failures and gives her a burner phone, the wildfires destroy Maggie's home. Six weeks later, she moves in with Haller, and they resume their reunite.

Aaron's parents hire Haller to sue Tidalwaiv, joining their claim with Brenda's case. McEvoy studies Aaron's chats with Wren, his AI companion. Brenda rejects a $20 million offer without an apology or admission of fault. Haller's team briefly accesses Wren through Aaron's computer at a police station, but Tidalwaiv cuts the feed. Naomi gives Haller her reports and emails, then agrees to testify. Brenda rejects a $50 million offer.

Haller also seeks a new hearing for David Snow, jailed for abusing his daughter Cassie two decades earlier. Now a law student, Cassie has brittle bone disease, which may account for her childhood injuries. Snow is dying of cancer.

At trial, Detective Douglas Clarke describes Aaron's bond with Wren. Chat records show Wren gave Aaron possible codes for his father's gun safe, including the correct one. Naomi says Clair used adult content and male bias despite being sold to children. Marcus Mason attacks her credibility by citing an affair with coder Patrick May. The Coltons settle their claim for $3 million, while Brenda refuses $10 million.

Experts testify about digital addiction and Wren's links to incel ideology. Tidalwaiv founder Victor Wendt offers Haller a $2 million bribe; Haller rejects it. An anonymous video appears to implicate Cisco in tampering with a sick juror, but Ruhlin keeps that juror. Haller questions coder Nathan Whittaker about misogynistic online accounts and ties to a dark web site. When Haller seeks to call Wren as a witness, Tidalwaiv accepts Brenda's terms: $52 million, a public apology, and corrections to Clair.

Brenda announces a center named for Rebecca, with McEvoy as director. Haller rewards his team and refuses Wendt's retainer. Leaving court, he learns David Snow has died.

== Release ==
The Proving Ground is scheduled to be released and publishing date by Little, Brown and Company in the United States on October 21, 2025.

== Reception ==
The Proving Ground received positive reviews from literary critics. Booklist awarded the novel a starred review, praising Connelly's courtroom sequences and describing it as "one of the best yet" from the author. Publishers Weekly praised the novel's treatment of artificial intelligence and adolescent loneliness, calling it a "fast-paced legal procedural" that would appeal to both newcomers and established readers of the series. The Irish Times commended Connelly's writing, stating that the novel stands alongside his strongest work.
