= The Law of Innocence =

2020 novel by Michael Connelly

- Hardcover edition
- Author: Michael Connelly
- Language: English
- Series: Mickey Haller
- Release number: 6
- Genre: Crime, mystery, thriller
- Publisher: Little, Brown and Company
- Publication date: November 10, 2020
- Publication place: United States
- Media type: Print (hardback & paperback)
- Pages: 432
- ISBN: 978-0-316-48562-3
- OCLC: 1157026399
- LC Class: PS3553.O51165 L39
- Preceded by: The Gods of Guilt
- Followed by: Resurrection Walk

The Law of Innocence is a crime thriller novel, and the thirty-fifth novel by American author Michael Connelly and the sixth to feature Los Angeles criminal defense attorney Mickey Haller.

The book was published on November 10, 2020 by Little, Brown and Company.

== Plot ==
Mickey Haller, a Los Angeles criminal defense attorney, celebrates a not-guilty verdict at the Redwood bar. Driving home, he is stopped by Officer Roy Milton of the Los Angeles Police Department, who claims the Lincoln Town Car has no rear license plate. When dark liquid drips from the trunk, Milton opens it without a warrant. Inside is the body of Sam Scales, a former client known for online donation scams, shot dead with his hands bound in duct tape. Haller is arrested and charged with first-degree murder.

Five weeks later, Haller represents himself at Twin Towers Correctional Facility. His law partner Jennifer Aronson serves as co-counsel, investigator Dennis "Cisco" Wojciechowski handles fieldwork, and Cisco's wife Lorna Taylor manages the office. Bail is set at $5 million, but Haller saves his resources for his daughter Hayley and refuses to waive his speedy-trial right, scheduling trial.

At a hearing before Judge Violet Warfield, Haller challenges Milton's traffic stop to secure his testimony under oath. He accuses prosecutor Dana Berg of withholding video evidence, prompting Warfield to order its discovery. A bullet from Haller's garage matches the one that killed Scales, and blood was found there. An independent toxicology report shows Scales had Rohypnol in his system.

Suspecting that deputies are monitoring privileged conversations, Haller invents a plan to flee to Mexico during a recorded call with Jennifer. When Berg cites the supposed escape plan at a bail hearing, Jennifer produces her recording, exposing the surveillance. Warfield reduces bail to $500,000 with an ankle monitor. Harry Bosch, Haller's half brother and retired LAPD homicide detective, helps fund the bond and joins the investigation.

The team identifies Louis Opparizio, a businessman Haller exposed during Lisa Trammel's murder trial nine years earlier. Opparizio lost a fortune and now operates through associates at BioGreen Industries, a biodiesel refinery receiving government subsidies. Grease beneath Scales's fingernails matches the refinery's feedstock. FBI agents Rick Aiello and Dawn Ruth confront Haller after he serves subpoenas; his security camera records Aiello's threats.

Berg finds a demand letter for $75,000 in unpaid fees from Scales and obtains a new indictment alleging murder for financial gain. Haller returns to jail to preserve his trial date. His team traces Scales to a Nevada prison and learns he used the alias Walter Lennon while working at the port. The evidence at a San Pedro address links him to BioGreen's subsidy fraud. An anonymous document indicates the FBI recruited Scales as an informant.

After an inmate attack nearly kills Haller, Jennifer leaves for a family emergency. Haller asks his first ex-wife, prosecutor Maggie McPherson, to join the defense. At trial, video undermines Milton's testimony, while Maggie discredits Trammel's allegations. A retired Environmental Protection Agency biologist describes the subsidy fraud and identifies Aiello and Ruth as agents overseeing his former case.

Ruth secretly confirms Scales was an informant who diverted subsidies through a shell company. Opparizio killed Scales after discovering the scheme, framing Haller in revenge for the Trammel trial. Opparizio's associates later murdered him using a red-haired killer.

The federal and local prosecutors offer to dismiss the charges if Haller remains silent about their investigation. He secures public exoneration, protection for Maggie's career, and an inquiry into Milton. The charges are dismissed with prejudice, and Haller's arrest record is expunged.

Ten days later, as COVID-19 shutdowns begin, Haller shelters with Maggie and Hayley. In a supermarket parking lot, he recognizes the red-haired assassin from hotel footage. The gunman fires but misses. FBI agents kill him, and Haller drives home, checking that his vanity plate, NT GLTY, remains in place.

== Reception ==
The Law of Innocence received positive reviews from critics. Publishers Weekly awarded the book a starred review, describing it as a “supremely intelligent, well-paced courtroom thriller.” Booklist also awarded it a starred review, while the Associated Press praised Connelly’s treatment of legal procedures. The book reached number one on Publishers Weekly’s mystery bestseller list in November 2020.
