= Manuel Garcia-Rulfo =

Mexican actor (born 1981)

Manuel García-Rulfo
- García-Rulfo at the 2026 New York Film Festival
- Born: Manuel García-Rulfo Lapuente; February 25, 1981 (age 45); Guadalajara, Jalisco, Mexico
- Occupation: Actor
- Years active: 2006–present

Manuel García-Rulfo Lapuente (born February 25, 1981) is a Mexican actor, working in both Mexico and the United States. He is known for his starring role since 2022 as lawyer Mickey Haller in the American television legal drama series The Lincoln Lawyer. He has appeared in films such as Cake (2014), The Magnificent Seven (2016), A Man Called Otto (2022) and Jurassic World Rebirth (2025), as well as the television series From Dusk till Dawn: The Series (2014–2015).

== Early life ==
García-Rulfo was born in Guadalajara, Jalisco, Mexico. He grew up on a ranch in Jalisco, where he learned to ride horses. At one point, he went to Vermont to study English.

He attended Universidad del Valle de Atemajac where he majored in communications before he realized his interest in filmmaking. He studied at the New York Film Academy, but decided to return to Mexico to continue his acting career.

== Career ==
Garcia-Rulfo made his first major American film with Bless Me, Ultima, as Uncle Pedro. In 2016, he played the outlaw Vasquez, one of the title characters, in The Magnificent Seven remake. The role required him to take up gun training, which he thought was difficult, though he stated, "I got blisters, but it was hilarious." In 2017, he co-starred in Kenneth Branagh's adaptation of Murder on the Orient Express, playing Biniamino Marquez, a character who originated in the novel as Antonio Foscarelli and was adapted specifically for him.

In early 2021, García-Rulfo was cast as Mickey Haller in a television adaptation of The Lincoln Lawyer for Netflix, replacing Logan Marshall-Green. In 2025, he starred in the seventh film of the Jurassic Park franchise, Jurassic World Rebirth.

== Filmography ==
=== Film ===
Year	Title	Role	Notes
2006	Valle de lágrimas	José	Short film
2007	Maquillaje	Mario	
2009	La última y nos vamos	Cristian	
2010	180°	Salvador Díaz	
2011	Poor Soul	Alan	Short film
2013	Bless Me, Ultima	Uncle Pedro	
2014	Cake	Arturo	
2015	Missed Trains	Him	Short film
2016	Term Life	Pedro	
2016	The Magnificent Seven	Vasquez	
2016	La vida inmoral de la pareja ideal	Lucio	
2016	Mexiwood	Axel Garcia	
2017	Murder on the Orient Express	Biniamino Marquez	
2018	Sicario: Day of the Soldado	Gallo	
2018	Widows	Carlos Perelli	
2018	Perfect Strangers	Mario	
2019	Mary	Mike Alvarez	
2019	6 Underground	Javier / Three	
2020	Greyhound	Lopez	
2021	Sweet Girl	Amo Santos	
2021	The King of All the World	Manuel	
2022	Dos Estaciones	Pepe	
2022	A Man Called Otto	Tommy	
2023	Good Savage	Meliton	
2024	A History of Love and War	Toño Muerte	
2024	Pedro Páramo	Pedro Páramo	Also executive producer
2025	Jurassic World Rebirth	Reuben Delgado	
2026	A Long Winter	Joe	

=== Television ===
Year	Title	Role	Notes
2011	El encanto del águila	Padre Pro	1 episode
2012	Ralph Inc.	Barrio Mexico	1 episode
2013	Touch	Father Esteban	1 episode
2013	Alguien Más	Gabriel	Main cast
2014–2015	From Dusk till Dawn: The Series	Narciso Menendez	Recurring role (seasons 1–2)
2016	L.A. Series	Junior	TV movie
2018	Goliath	Gabriel Ortega	Recurring role (season 2)
2022–present	The Lincoln Lawyer	Mickey Haller	Lead role
