= Mickey Haller =

Fictional character

J. Michael Haller, Jr.
- Manuel Garcia-Rulfo as Mickey Haller in The Lincoln Lawyer (TV series)
- First appearance: The Lincoln Lawyer
- Created by: Michael Connelly
- Portrayed by: Matthew McConaughey; Manuel Garcia-Rulfo

In-universe information
- Full name: J. Michael Haller, Junior
- Nicknames: Mickey, The Lincoln Lawyer
- Gender: Male
- Occupation: Defense attorney
- Spouses: Maggie McPherson (divorced); Lorna Taylor (divorced)
- Children: Hayley Haller (daughter)
- Relatives: J. Michael Haller Sr. (father; deceased); Elena (mother, TV series only); Hieronymus "Harry" Bosch (half-brother); Madeline Bosch (niece)
- Nationality: Mexican & American

J. Michael Haller, Junior is a fictional character created by Michael Connelly in his 2005 novel The Lincoln Lawyer. Haller, a Los Angeles–based defense attorney, is the younger paternal half-brother of Connelly's best-known character, LAPD Detective Hieronymus "Harry" Bosch. The Mickey Haller series currently consists of eight published novels, with Haller also appearing as a supporting player in six Bosch novels.

A film adaptation of The Lincoln Lawyer (2011) starred Matthew McConaughey as Mickey Haller.

A television series adaptation of The Lincoln Lawyer from David E. Kelley, Ted Humphrey, and A+E Studios, was released on Netflix in September 2022. The first season is based on the second book in the series, though it also contains elements of the first book. A second season, based on the fourth book and also containing elements of the first, was released in 2023. Mexican actor Manuel Garcia-Rulfo stars as Mickey Haller, and the series explores the character's maternal Latino heritage. He follows his father in a career as a criminal defense lawyer. A third season was released in 2025 and a fourth season was released in 2026.

== Character biography ==
=== Background ===
Haller is significantly younger than his half-brother, Bosch. When Bosch first met his father, Michael Haller Sr., Bosch was an adult but Mickey was only five years old. (However, in chapter 19 of The Black Ice, Bosch mentions there was one unnamed half-brother. Bosch notes that the half-brother is a defense attorney and "probably born a few years ahead of Bosch".) The elder Michael Haller was one of Los Angeles' premier criminal defense attorneys and his clients included mobster Mickey Cohen and one of the Manson girls.

J. Michael Haller Jr. was born from his father's second marriage. His parents wed less than two months after his father divorced his first wife, and the Haller son was born five months later, into a family of wealth. Haller's mother was much younger than his father and was from Mexico, where she was a famous actress. In The Fifth Witness, Haller says that he looks "more south of the border than north". Little is known of Haller's childhood other than his father died when the boy was young (shortly after the meeting with Bosch) and his inheritance of his father's Colt Woodsman pistol, mentioned in The Lincoln Lawyer (2005), the first of the series. Haller grew up with his mother and was bilingual. He followed in his father's footsteps by becoming a defense attorney. Most of Haller's knowledge of his father comes from law books he has read and stories from judges and other lawyers who had worked with the elder Haller prior to his death.

The Mickey Haller novels are narrated almost exclusively in the first-person by Mickey Haller. The second novel featuring Mickey Haller, The Reversal (2010), could be considered a crossover novel, as it contains both Harry Bosch–centered chapters, narrated in the third person (including third-person scenes featuring Mickey Haller) and Mickey Haller–centered chapters, narrated in the first person.

All but two of the Harry Bosch novels are narrated in the third person. (Both Lost Light (2003) and The Narrows (2004) are narrated in the first person by the temporarily retired Harry Bosch.) Although The Crossing (2015) features appearances by Mickey Haller, it is classified as a Harry Bosch novel because it is narrated entirely in the third person.

As of 2026, there are eight novels in the Lincoln Lawyer series. The sixth is The Law of Innocence (2020), which is narrated from Haller's point of view. In 2023, a seventh was published, titled Resurrection Walk, the second crossover novel in the series where some chapters focus on Bosch. In 2025, the eighth, titled The Proving Ground, was published.

=== Personal life ===
Haller has been married and divorced twice. He was first married to Maggie McPherson and they have a daughter Hayley. McPherson is a career prosecutor with the Los Angeles County District Attorney's Office, and is nicknamed "McFierce" by defense lawyers. They divorced due to their opposite careers—Haller was defending accused criminals, while McPherson was prosecuting them. They continue to maintain a close relationship, with periodic reconciliations.

Haller next married Lorna Taylor. She became Haller's Case Manager. She married again, to Haller's investigator, Dennis "Cisco" Wojciechowski. Haller maintains good relationships with both of his ex-wives and has joint custody of his daughter, who grew up speaking Spanish as well as English. In The Brass Verdict, Haller is revealed to have visitation of his daughter on Wednesday nights and alternate weekends. By the events of The Fifth Witness, however, Haller says that is only the "official arrangement" and he sees his daughter far more frequently.

During the series Haller has used two private investigators for his trials. The first, Raul "Mish" Levin, was murdered during the events of The Lincoln Lawyer. Haller had nicknamed him "Mish" after learning of his "mish-mash" of Mexican-Jewish ancestry. His second investigator, Wojciechowski, was formerly a member of the motorcycle gang The Road Saints, whom Haller frequently represented. The gang had nicknamed him after the Cisco Kid, an outlaw-adventurer Wild West character created by O. Henry in 1907. Cisco was introduced in The Brass Verdict. Following Bosch's retirement, Haller has also engaged the services of his half-brother during times when Cisco was injured or otherwise incapable of working.

Haller was nicknamed "the Lincoln Lawyer" because of his preference for working out of his Lincoln Town Car instead of an office. However, during The Fifth Witness, Haller temporarily rents an office on a one-year lease. With the influx in foreclosure clients at that time, Haller hired an associate, Jennifer "Bullocks" Aronson, a new graduate of Southwestern Law School. (This is located in the former department store Bullocks Wilshire.)

In Nine Dragons, Haller makes a short cameo as Harry Bosch's lawyer. He later suggests that their daughters (Mickey's Hayley and Harry's Maddie) should get together. They later meet during the events of The Reversal. The book also refers to the movie adaptation of The Lincoln Lawyer starring Matthew McConaughey.

Haller has moral qualms about representing the guilty, and his concerns are a constant theme in the series. Twice he attempted to move to the prosecution side. In The Reversal, Haller is appointed as a special prosecutor to overturn the exoneration of Jason Jessup, a convicted child-murderer who was freed after DNA evidence cleared him of wrongdoing. Haller teams up with McPherson and Bosch to retry Jessup. At the end of The Fifth Witness, Haller files to run for Los Angeles County district attorney, with McPherson's support. At the beginning of The Gods of Guilt, however, it is revealed that his campaign turned into disaster when the client whom he got acquitted for drunk driving, gets drunk, drives, and kills a mother and her daughter. The girl was a classmate of Haller's daughter and she blames her father for the death, refusing to talk to him for most of the book.

== Appearances ==
=== Novels ===
==== Mickey Haller series ====
#	Novel	Role	Partner and associates	Client
1	The Lincoln Lawyer (2005)	Defense Attorney	Lorna Taylor (secretary), Raul Levin (private investigator)	Louis Roulet; accused rapist and attempted murderer
2	The Brass Verdict (2008)	Defense Attorney	Harry Bosch (police investigation), Lorna Taylor (secretary), Dennis "Cisco" Wojciechowski (private investigator)	Walter Elliot; accused murderer
3	The Reversal (2010)	Prosecutor	Maggie McPherson (second chair), Harry Bosch (lead investigator)	Jason Jessup; accused murder
4	The Fifth Witness (2011)	Defense Attorney	Jennifer "Bullocks" Aronson (second chair), Lorna Taylor (practice manager), Dennis "Cisco" Wojciechowski (private investigator)	Lisa Trammel; accused murderer
5	The Gods of Guilt (2013)	Defense Attorney	Jennifer "Bullocks" Aronson (second chair), Lorna Taylor (practice manager), Dennis "Cisco" Wojciechowski (private investigator), David "Legal" Siegel (mentor)	Andre LaCosse; accused murderer
6	The Law of Innocence (2020)	Defense Attorney, Pro Se	Jennifer "Bullocks" Aronson (second chair), Lorna Taylor (practice manager), Dennis "Cisco" Wojciechowski (private investigator), Maggie McPherson (second chair), Harry Bosch (investigator)	Mickey Haller; accused murderer
7	Resurrection Walk (2023)	Defense Attorney	Harry Bosch (investigator)	Lucinda Sanz, accused murderer
8	The Proving Ground (2025)	Public Interest Attorney	Jack McEvoy (journalist)	Brenda Randolph, victim's mother

==== Harry Bosch series ====
- 12. Echo Park (2006)
- 14. Nine Dragons (2009)
- 18. The Crossing (2015)
- 19. The Wrong Side of Goodbye (2016)
- 20. Two Kinds of Truth (2017)
- 22. The Night Fire (2019)

=== Short stories ===
- "The Perfect Triangle", in The Dark End of the Street (2010)
- "Burnt Matches", in "The Highway Kind: Tales of Fast Cars, Desperate Drives and Dark Roads" (Oct 2016)

== Film and television ==
Film	Haller	Role	Partner and associates	Client
The Lincoln Lawyer (2011)	Matthew McConaughey	Defense Attorney	Lorna Taylor (secretary); Frank Levin (private investigator); Earl Briggs (chauffeur); Val Valenzuela (bail bondsman)	Louis Roulet, accused rapist and murderer Gloria Dayton, prostitute, drug addict Eddie Vogel, biker gang leader Harold "Hard Case" Casey, biker gang member, drug grower (currently incarcerated); Jesus Martinez, accused rapist and murderer (currently incarcerated)
The Lincoln Lawyer (2022–present)	Manuel Garcia-Rulfo	Defense Attorney	Lorna Crane (secretary, associate lawyer); Dennis "Cisco" Wojciechowski (private investigator); Izzy Letts (driver, clerk, office manager); Eddie Rojas (driver); Yannick Bamba (driver); Maggie McPherson (temporary second chair)	Trevor Elliot; accused murderer Izzy Letts, grand theft Terrell Coleman, assault on a police officer Kymberly Wagstaff, public nudity Eli Wyms, attempted murder of police officers (currently incarcerated); Sam Scales, internet fraud Teddy Vogel, biker gang leader Harold "Hard Case" Casey, biker gang member, meth cook, parole violation (currently incarcerated); Jesus Menendez, accused rapist and murderer (currently incarcerated); Lisa Trammell, accused murderer Russell Lawson, burglary and indecent exposure Gloria Dayton, prostitution and drug possession Angelica Coleman, vandalism Julian La Cosse, accused murderer (currently incarcerated); Eddie Rojas, carjacking Oscar Guerrero, aggravated robbery Mickey Haller, accused murderer

=== Box office performance ===
Film	Release date		Box office revenue			Budget	Reference
Film	Worldwide	United States	North America	Other Territories	Worldwide	Budget	Reference
The Lincoln Lawyer	March 18, 2011		$58,009,200	$17,000,000	$75,009,200	$40,000,000	
