= The Fifth Witness =

2011 novel by Michael Connelly

- Hardcover edition
- Author: Michael Connelly
- Language: English
- Series: Mickey Haller
- Release number: 3
- Genre: Crime, mystery, thriller
- Publisher: Little, Brown and Company
- Publication date: April 5, 2011
- Publication place: United States
- Media type: Print (hardback & paperback)
- Pages: 421
- ISBN: 978-0-316-06935-9
- OCLC: 668192488
- Dewey Decimal: 813/.54
- LC Class: PS3553.O51165 F55 2011
- Preceded by: The Reversal
- Followed by: The Gods of Guilt

The Fifth Witness is a crime thriller novel, and the twenty-third novel by American author Michael Connelly and features the fourth starring appearance of Los Angeles criminal defense attorney Michael "Mickey" Haller.

The book was published in the United States on April 5, 2011 by Little, Brown and Company, and won the 2012 Harper Lee Prize for Legal Fiction.

== Plot ==
Mickey Haller, a Los Angeles defense attorney, takes on the case of Lisa Trammel, a long-standing client accused of murdering wealthy real estate developer Mitchell Bondurant. Bondurant was struck on the crown of his head with a hammer while standing upright. His height of six feet two inches raises questions about the attack and whether Trammel could have delivered the fatal blow. Haller must challenge the prosecution's account and persuade the jury that the evidence does not establish her guilt.

Haller receives help from his former wife, Lorna Taylor, and his investigator, Dennis "Cisco" Wojciechowski, who is married to Lorna. Together, they examine the evidence and search for other people who might have had reasons to kill Bondurant. The prosecution is led by Andrea Freeman, an attorney Haller has never defeated in court. Their legal contest forces Haller to examine each piece of evidence carefully and test the claims made against his client.

As the defense team examines Bondurant's affairs, Haller learns that the developer may have had ties to organized crime. This possibility opens another line of inquiry, giving the defense grounds to question whether Trammel was the only person with a motive to kill him. Forensic findings also cast doubt on the prosecution's account, indicating that Trammel may lack the physical ability to strike Bondurant in the manner described. Haller builds his defense around these doubts and seeks to establish that another person could have committed the crime.

The trial turns on a witness (Louis Opparizio) whose criminal associations could point toward an alternative suspect. Haller carefully questions the witness, leading him to invoke the Fifth Amendment, which protects individuals from being compelled to incriminate themselves. The witness refuses to answer further questions before Haller can present the full extent of his criminal ties. The judge admonishes the jury to disregard the testimony, leaving the defense with a difficult legal problem. Despite this instruction, the testimony has raised doubts about who killed Bondurant. The jury finds Trammel not guilty.

After the acquittal, Haller comes to believe that Trammel did commit the murder. When he confronts her, her lack of concern unsettles him and forces him to reconsider the meaning of his victory. Winning in court has freed his client from conviction, but it has not brought him the certainty or satisfaction he expected.

Three weeks later, Haller's practice prospers following the trial. Trammel calls him again, accusing him of alerting the police to search her garden and asking him to defend her in the case concerning her husband's murder. Haller refuses to represent her. He tells her that he has filed to run for Los Angeles County District Attorney, marking a change in his professional direction. His decision reflects his unwillingness to continue representing clients whose conduct he can no longer accept. The case leaves Haller facing difficult questions about justice, legal ethics, and the difference between proving innocence in court and believing someone is innocent.
