= Bosch: Legacy =

American drama television series (2022–2025)

- Genre: Detective fiction; Drama
- Based on: The novels by Michael Connelly
- Developed by: Michael Connelly; Tom Bernardo; Eric Overmyer
- Starring: Titus Welliver; Mimi Rogers; Madison Lintz; Stephen Chang; Denise G. Sanchez; Paul Calderón; Maggie Q
- Music by: Jeff Russo
- Opening theme: "Times Are Changing" by: Built By Titan; Skybourne
- Country of origin: United States
- Original language: English
- No. of seasons: 3
- No. of episodes: 30

Production
- Executive producers: Zetna Fuentes; Titus Welliver; Pieter Jan Brugge; Henrik Bastin; Michael Connelly; Tom Bernardo; Eric Overmyer
- Producers: Mark Douglas; Jamie Boscardin Martin
- Running time: 41–54 minutes
- Production companies: Hieronymus Pictures; Fabrik Entertainment; Amazon MGM Studios

Original release
- Network: Amazon Freevee
- Release: May 6, 2022 – April 17, 2025

Related
- Bosch; Ballard

Bosch: Legacy is an American police procedural television series developed by Michael Connelly, Tom Bernardo and Eric Overmyer. A sequel to the Amazon Prime Video series Bosch (2014–2021), it stars Titus Welliver as former LAPD detective Harry Bosch, with Mimi Rogers and Madison Lintz also reprising their roles. The series premiered on May 6, 2022, on Amazon Freevee with the release of four episodes; the remaining episodes were released weekly, two episodes at a time. The series was renewed for a second season prior to its premiere. The second season premiered on October 20, 2023, again with the release of four episodes; the remaining episodes were also released weekly, two at a time. The series was later renewed for a third season, prior to its second-season premiere. Season 3 premiered on March 27, 2025, and concluded Bosch: Legacy.

== Plot ==
=== Season 1 ===
Based on The Wrong Side of Goodbye (Book 19) and The Night Fire (Book 22)

Hieronymus "Harry" Bosch has retired from the LAPD and works as a private investigator. Defense attorney Honey "Money" Chandler has him work on some cases for her. His daughter, Maddie, navigates her first days as a patrol officer with the LAPD, working from Hollywood Station, where her father used to be assigned. Bosch investigates businessman Carl Rogers, who previously hired a hitman to kill Chandler. Billionaire businessman Whitney Vance asks Bosch to discreetly investigate a private matter.

=== Season 2 ===
Based on The Wrong Side of Goodbye (Book 19) and The Crossing (Book 18)

Season 2 begins where season 1 left off, with the kidnapping of Maddie Bosch. Bosch and Honey "Money" Chandler work together to catch a killer, while dodging the suspicions of the FBI as suspects in a case from season 1: the killing of Carl Rogers. Maddie, following the kidnapping, struggles to find her place in her job.

=== Season 3 ===
Based on Desert Star (Book 24) and The Black Ice (Book 2)
Finale based on Dark Sacred Night (Book 21)

Honey "Money" Chandler campaigns to become the Los Angeles District Attorney (DA) while Bosch investigates the disappearance of the entire Gallagher family and is implicated as a conspirator in the murder of Maddie's kidnapper, Kurt Dockweiler. Chandler is successfully elected DA. Bosch is cleared of involvement in the murder of Dockweiler and solves the Gallagher murders but the culprit flees to Mexico. Bosch investigates the murder of his colleague Jimmy Robertson and links it to a drug cartel, while Chandler deals with powerful political opponents. Maddie investigates a group of robbers. The finale has Bosch meet Detective Renee Ballard while investigating a cold case, and working with her to solve it.

== Cast ==
=== Main cast ===
- Titus Welliver as Hieronymus "Harry" Bosch, a former LAPD detective, now retired and working as a freelance private investigator
- Mimi Rogers as Honey "Money" Chandler, a high-powered attorney who has a periodically adversarial relationship with Harry
- Madison Lintz as Madeline "Maddie" Bosch, a rookie Los Angeles police officer and Harry's daughter
- Stephen Chang as Maurice "Mo" Bassi, Harry's technology expert, who shares Harry's love of jazz
- Denise G. Sanchez as Officer Reina Vasquez (seasons 2–3; recurring season 1), Maddie's partner and former training officer
- Paul Calderón as Detective III Santiago "Jimmy" Robertson (season 3 (Note: Credited among the main cast in the first five episodes only.)), a seasoned detective and former colleague of Harry brought in to investigate the death of Kurt Dockweiler
- Maggie Q as Detective III Renée Ballard (season 3 (Note: Credited among the main cast in the final episode only.))

=== Recurring ===
- Anthony Gonzales as Officer Rico Perez, Maddie's fellow officer with whom she develops a romantic relationship
- Will Chase (season 1) and David Denman (seasons 1–2) as Kurt Dockweiler, a city inspector (Denman replaced Chase in season 2, and they reshot the character's scenes of season 1 to replace the original ones)
- Danielle Larracuente as Paulina Calderon, Maddie's academy classmate, who is shot during a stop
- David Moses as Martin "Marty" Rose, the name partner at the law firm where Honey practices, who is her mentor and confidant
- Alex Loynaz as Matthew Ramirez, the receptionist at Honey's law firm
- Jim Holmes as Emmett Archer, the District Attorney for LA
- Len Cordova as Dr. Miguel Estevez, Chandler's therapist
- Raff Anoushian as Leo Aslan, an associate of Carl Rogers who owns a shipping company
- Lakin Valdez as Raul Arraya, a former client of Honey's
- Bruce Davison as James Rafferty, Kurt Dockweiler's lawyer
- Jason Dirden as Detective Morrison, Maddie and Vasquez's superior
- Jessica Camacho as Jade Quinn, a hacker
- Cora Welliver as Sam, a woman who walks Coltrane for Bosch
- Stephanie Erb as Amanda Scones, Honey Chandler's lawyer
- James Read as Captain Rick Seals, captain of RHD in the LAPD
- Jeff Corbett as Judge Ronald Baker, an LA judge
- Guy Garner as Judge Simon Newland, an LA judge

==== Season 1 ====
- Michael Rose as Carl Rogers, a businessman responsible for the murder of a judge and Honey's shooting
- Don Luce as Willy Datz, a mob boss affiliated with Carl Rogers
- Sam Valentine as Jasmine, Carl Rogers' mistress
- Paul Hipp as Glenn Kading, Carl Rogers' lawyer
- Phil Morris as John Creighton, head of Trinity Security, a security company employed by Whitney Vance
- William Devane as Whitney Vance, a billionaire engineer who hires Bosch for a personal matter
- Andrew Korba as Philip Corwin, the new CEO of Whitney Vance's company
- Kate Burton as Ida Porter, Vance's secretary
- Steven Flynn as David Sloan, Vance's valet/butler
- Terri Hoyos as Olivia MacDonald, the adopted daughter of Whitney Vance
- Alma Martinez as Gabriela Lida, a photographer
- Roxana Brusso as Vibiana Veracruz, Gabriela's daughter, an artist
- Liam James Ramos as Gilberto Veracruz, Vibiana's son
- Mark Rolston as Lt I Don Thorne, watch commander on Maddie's shift at the Hollywood Station
- Tom Costello as Lt Cosgrove, a lieutenant in the LAPD with a shady past
- Konstantin Melikhov as Alexei Ivanovich, a high-ranking member of the Bratva
- Bogdan Yasinski as Lev Ivanovich, a high ranking enforcer for the Bratva
- Marcus Giamatti as Simon Wakefield, Carl Rogers' financier
- Mike Ostroski as Russ Pensak, an associate of Carl Rogers who owns an abandoned oil refinery
- Joe Adler as Jeffery Herstadt, a client of Honey's
- Hugo Armstrong as Detective Gustafson, the detective investigating Jeffery Herstadt
- Carlos Arrellano as Detective Poydras, the detective investigating Whitney Vance's death
- Reuben Lee as James Sharp, a suspect accused of shooting a police officer

==== Season 2 ====
- Rafael Cabrera as Vince Harrick, a sheriff's deputy married to Lexi Parks
- Kim Pettiford as Alexandra "Lexi" Parks, a murder victim
- Patrick Brennan as David Foster, a client of Honey's accused of murder
- Terryn Westbrook as Louise Foster, David Foster's wife
- Anthony Michael Hall as Special Agent Will Barron, James' and Jones' superior
- Max Martini as Det. Don Ellis, a corrupt detective attempting to discredit Honey
- Guy Wilson as Det. Kevin Long, a corrupt detective working with Ellis
- Jakki Jandrell and Julie Burrise as Ashley and Annie Bobsey, prostitutes affiliated with Ellis and Long
- Heng Theng and Thom Tran as Peter and Paul Nguyen, brothers who own a jewelry store and are affiliated with Ellis and Long
- Alex Castillo and Angelo Pagan as Det. Gene Santana and Det. Alton Duran, detectives investigating the murder of Lexi Parks
- Jolene Kay as Agent Sylvia James, an FBI agent investigating Bosch and Chandler, Jones' partner
- Vincent Laresca as Agent Lucas Jones, an FBI agent investigating Bosch and Chandler, James' partner
- Ty Trumbo as James Allen, a prostitute and Foster's dealer
- Patrick Day as George Schubert, a doctor affiliated with Ellis and Long
- Eddie Yu as Brad Landreth, the DDA prosecuting David Foster

==== Season 3 ====
- Miles Gaston Villanueva as Det. Perry Lopez, Robertson's new partner
- Aisha Kabia as Michelle Carter, Honey Chandler's daughter
- Daya Vaidya as Jen Kowski, Honey Chandler's campaign advisor
- Eddie Steeples as Curtis Dignan, a parolee and CI of Bosch
- Sophina Brown as Chief Hughes, the new chief of police
- Jesse Gallegos as Nestor Gomez, a thief
- Tommy Martinez as Albert Torres, a thief
- Andrea Cortes as Victoria Hernandez, Albert's girlfriend, fence and lookout
- Ricco Ross as Jon, a man robbed by Albert and Nestor
- Orla Brady as Siobhan Murphy, a woman who hires Bosch to investigate the disappearance of her family
- Dale Dickey as Sheila Walsh, a partner at the construction business owned by Siobhan Murphy's son-in-law
- Michael Reilly Burke as Finbar McShane, a partner at the construction business owned by Siobhan Murphy's son-in-law
- Julio Cesar Cedillo as Beto Orestes, a sheriff acquainted with Bosch
- Matthew Downs as Stephen Gallagher, Siobhan Murphy's son-in-law
- Christine Renaud as Kathleen Gallagher, Siobhan Murphy's daughter
- Sophia Kopera as Kerry Gallagher, Siobhan Murphy's granddaughter
- Ian Casselberry as Bing Crider, an ex-gangster affiliated with Finbar McShane
- Jackie Kay as Chris, a public defender who enters a relationship with Maddie
- Jeremy Glazer as Patrick Currey, an LA city councilman who comes into conflict with Chandler
- Esteban Carmona as Diego Perra, a small-time criminal
- Philip Anthony-Rodriguez as L. Roman Stallworth, Diego Perra's lawyer
- Tim DeKay as Corvus Pike, a lawyer prosecuting Diego Perra
- Victoria Gabrielle Platt as Raquel Bowers, a lawyer prosecuting Diego Perra
- Zilah Mendoza as Mari Torres, Albert's mother, Reina Vasquez' sister
- Manuel Uriza as Humberto Zorillo, a Mexican drug lord
- Chris Bauer as Deputy Jack Garrity, a sheriff's deputy in league with Zorillo
- Ruben Rabasa as Mr. Vasquez, Reina Vasquez' grandfather
- Gonzalo Menendez as Ken Gurbizs, a former soldier in the same unit as Bosch
- Alejandra Flores as Maria Hernandez, Victoria's mother
- Carlos Alvarado as Esteban Hernandez, Victoria's father
- Owain Yeoman as Jeremy McKee

Guest appearances are made by members of the Bosch cast, including Gregory Scott Cummins as Crate, Troy Evans as Barrel, Jamie Hector as Detective Jerry Edgar, DaJuan Johnson as Detective Rondell Pierce, Jacqueline Obradors as Detective Christina Vega, Cynthia McWilliams as Detective Joan Bennett, Alan Rosenberg as Dr. William Golliher, Scott Klace as Sgt. John "Mank" Mankiewicz. Jacqueline Pinol as Detective Julie Espinozsa and David Marciano as Det. Brad Coniff. Eric Ladin returned in Season 2 as Los Angeles Times reporter Scott Anderson, while Deji LaRay returned as Sgt. Julius Edgewood, now Maddie's superior. In the last episode of season 2, late actor Lance Reddick appeared a final time as Ret. Chief Irvin Irving following his death, while Chris Browning appeared again as Preston Borders, a criminal arrested by Bosch during his time as a detective. In the third-season premiere, Jamie McShane returned as Francis "Frank" Sheehan, a former detective fired after being exposed for police brutality. Later in the season, Juliet Landau returned as Rita Tedesco, Preston Borders' wife, while Verona Blue returned as Shaz, a bartender acquainted with Jimmy Robertson. Celestino Cornielle also returned as DEA Agent Charlie Hovan.

Welliver's younger son Quinn portrays Bosch as a child in Bosch; in Bosch: Legacy his elder son, Eamonn, portrays Bosch, now a young LAPD officer.

== Episodes ==
Season	Episodes	Originally released	
Season	Episodes	First released	Last released
1	10	May 6, 2022	May 27, 2022
2	10	October 20, 2023	November 9, 2023
3	10	March 27, 2025	April 17, 2025

=== Season 1 (2022) ===
No. overall	No. in season	Title	Directed by	Written by	Original release date
1	1	"The Wrong Side of Goodbye"	Zetna Fuentes	Michael Connelly & Eric Overmyer	May 6, 2022
Shortly after retiring at the end of the previous series, Harry Bosch now works as a private investigator. He is asked to investigate a personal matter by billionaire Whitney Vance, namely, to find the woman he impregnated while in college to see if he has an heir. Meanwhile, his daughter Maddie is in training to become a police officer, but struggles with harsh training officers. Honey Chandler, recovered from her injuries, attends the trial of Carl Rogers, who attempted to have her killed, along with Bosch and Maddie. A mistrial is declared, and the district attorney decides not to try again, angering all three. Chandler goes back to work and is given the case of Jeffery Herstadt, a homeless man with mental problems accused of killing a respected doctor, who has confessed. She asks Bosch to look at the confession and testify about possible coercion, and Maddie convinces him to do so. After discovering the confession was indeed coerced, he does, but Chandler is shortly afterward shown DNA evidence found on the victim seemingly proving Herstadt's guilt anyway. Investigating for Vance, Bosch finds the woman is now dead, but intends to continue searching for the child. Vance agrees, but is later found unresponsive by his secretary. Chandler asks Bosch to help her get Rogers convicted, which he agrees to, but says they will do it "his way". Meanwhile, an earthquake damages Bosch's house, causing a city inspector to label it unsafe.
2	2	"Pumped"	Patrick Cady	Tom Bernardo	May 6, 2022
After Whitney Vance is revealed to be fine, his intended successor, Philip Corwin, worries about why he hired a private investigator, and expresses this to John Creighton, the head of Vance's security company. Chandler, despite struggling with the trauma of being shot, finds out how Herstadt's DNA ended up on the murder victim, and reveals it in court, causing the DA to drop the case. Afterward, Detective Gustafson, the detective in charge of the case, accosts her, and claims Bosch has undone everything he did with the badge. In his investigation into Carl Rogers, Bosch has Chandler convince Judge Sobel's daughter to file a wrongful death suit against Rogers. He also has his tech expert, Maurice "Mo" Bassi, plant bugs on Rogers' vehicles. Watching a deposition, he finds that Rogers may be affiliated with Russian mobsters, and discovers he is being tracked. He later overhears Rogers receiving a call from his financier, Simon Wakefield, that the Russians want to meet, which unnerves Rogers. Later, two Russians men kill a man who stole from their boss. In his investigation into Vance's child, he finds the home where the woman died, and discovers she gave birth to a boy who was adopted under the name Dominick Santanello. Meanwhile, Maddie screws up an arrest, but her training officer, Reyna Vasquez, covers it up when she manages to find where the suspect went, telling her she will take a chance on her.
3	3	"Message in a Bottle"	Alex Zakrzewski	Naomi Iizuka	May 6, 2022
Bosch and Chandler visit Willy Datz, the mobster through whom Rogers hired the hitman, in prison, where Chandler intimidates him into revealing he changed his story after the Russians threatened his family, to the disapproval of her boss. Maddie and Vasquez are called to the scene of a rape, where Maddie identifies the rapist's point of entry as a window with a cut screen. Later, she offers to speak to the victim if she ever needs help, to Vasquez' disapproval. Bosch investigates Dominick Santanello, and discovers he died in Vietnam in 1972. He informs Vance, and Vance asks him to find out anything else about Dominick. He is followed from the meeting by another car, but loses it, before Mo informs him that Rogers is headed to a meeting with the Russians, and heads to the meeting. At the meeting, the Russians threaten Rogers and Wakefield to pay them 40 million dollars, which Rogers agrees to, but claims he will need time. They give him a week. Bosch eavesdrops, but is discovered and chased away, eventually escaping. After going to an old contact who identifies the Russians as brothers Alexei and Lev Ivanovich, high ranking Bratva members, he informs Chandler, and tells her the calls Rogers made while incarcerated were to a gas station in Bakersfield. Afterward, he arranges to meet Dominick's sister, Olivia MacDonald. On his way to the meeting he is followed by the car, but loses it and goes to the meeting in a rental. As he leaves, he is shown to be observed through a drone by Vance's security company.
4	4	"Horseshoes and Hand Grenades"	Patrick Cady	Barbara Curry	May 6, 2022
Bosch meets Olivia, and when shown Dominick's belongings, he finds a roll of film of a woman and a baby she does not recognize. He has it enhanced, and finds it was taken when Dominick would have been in Vietnam, and considers he may have gone AWOL to see the girl, who may have been his daughter. Olivia is later visited by two men from Vance's security company, posing as representatives of the Veteran's Association, and informs Bosch that they asked her if Dominick had any children. Bosch realizes he is still being tracked, and Mo informs him he is probably watched by a drone. When trying to report to Vance, he meets David Sloan, Vance's valet and butler, who tells him Vance is ill, and to report to him. He refuses, and asks Chandler to provide him with a lab to confirm Dominick's heritage. Chandler receives the case of Russell Barnes, who wants to sue the LAPD for wrongful arrest after being incorrectly identified by facial recognition software. She proves to the detective that Barnes is innocent. When the department offers a settlement of 1.2 million, Chandler wishes to press further, but Barnes decides to take the money. Meanwhile, Bosch and Chandler publicly serve Rogers a subpoena for wrongful death, and when the Russians find out, Lev threatens Rogers. When Rogers meets Wakefield and two other men at a diner, Bosch has his former coworkers Crate and Barrel listen to their conversation and follow them. They find the other men are Russ Pensak, who owns a supposedly abandoned oil refinery, and Leo Aslan, who owns a shipping company, and notice several tanker trucks entering and leaving the refinery. Bosch also listens to a recording of the conversation, where Rogers mentions having 48 hours. Bosch infiltrates the refinery and finds that they are stealing gas, and have set IEDs on the pipe. After sending proof to Chandler, he attempts to leave, but is caught by a security guard and held at gunpoint. Meanwhile, Maddie continues to struggle with the rape case, and Vance's secretary, Ida, is shown to know how to forge his signature as Vance asks her to help out since he no longer is able to write himself.
5	5	"Plan B"	Alex Zakrzewski	Chris Wu	May 13, 2022
Bosch bluffs his way out of the building by pretending to be a security officer doing a surprise inspection, and informs Chandler that Rogers intends to siphon more gas by installing a second tap when the pipe is shut down for maintenance. Using this information, Chandler attempts to intimidate Wakefield, but this exchange is seen by Alexei. He eventually decides to give up information, but is killed by Lev before he can. Chandler finds him dead and takes his phone, delivering it to Mo, who recovers the information on it, revealing that the new tap will be installed that night, as well as a blueprint called Plano. Realizing from the full conversation that the detonator for the IEDs is on Aslan's key fob, Mo and Bosch make a plan to detonate the pipe before they steal the gas by hijacking the detonator's signal, while Chandler contacts Rogers' lawyer Glenn Kading to negotiate a deal for the civil suit with Rogers personally. That night, Bosch is forced to approach Aslan face to face to hijack the signal, but they blow up the pipe before any gas is stolen. In a meeting with Chandler and Kading, Rogers receives a message that the pipe was destroyed, and Chandler offers him the deal to turn himself in for everything he did in exchange for protection from the Russians. Meanwhile, as Bosch continues to investigate Dominick, Vance is shown to be comatose, while Sloan interferes with Bosch's communications. Bosch tracks down a friend of Dominick to see if he knew if Dominick had children, and shows him the photo. The friend recognizes the woman, telling Bosch that she was a photojournalist, and that Dominick was in love with her. Later, after Bosch hears a news report that Vance is dead, he is contacted by Sloan, who tells him his services are no longer necessary. Hearing the same report, Corwin tells Creighton to stop observing Bosch. Meanwhile, Maddie helps the rape victim install a new security system. Afterwards, she has a talk with Harry, who tells her she needs to decide if being a cop is a mission or just a job. Inspired by this, she reviews an app the victim told her about on what is happening in the neighborhood, finding more reports of break ins through cut screens.
6	6	"Chain of Authenticity"	Sharat Raju	Tom Bernardo & Eric Overmyer	May 13, 2022
After calling Chandler and unsuccessfully asking for leniency, Kading delivers a vial of drugs to Rogers at the safe house he has been sequestered at. The next morning he uses them to incapacitate his guards and escape. Alexei and Lev, after interrogating Rogers' girlfriend for his whereabouts, meet up with their father Maxim, and find and kill Kading. After finding a newspaper article denouncing him and Chandler for defending Herstadt, Bosch decides to find the real killer, while Chandler discovers that Plano is one of two modified shipping containers arriving at South Beach. After finding Rogers has escaped, Chandler and Bosch investigate the two containers under the assumption that Rogers will use one of them to escape overseas. Chandler witnesses the Russians store Kading's body in one of the containers, then kill Rogers and seal both bodies in the container before leaving. Meanwhile, Bosch receives Vance's will, which names him executor and Ida as receiving 10 million dollars, and Chandler tells him not to tell anyone until he can confirm whether Vance had an heir. Paulina Calderon, a friend of Maddie, is shot during a traffic stop, and Maddie is told to help inform the family. When Bosch hears of the shooting and confirms Maddie was not the victim, he realizes who is following him, and confronts Creighton, who attempts to intimidate him into dropping his investigation. He meets Maddie, and after she tells him she still wants to be a cop, he tells her about a time he was shot and Eleanor, Maddie's mother and a former FBI agent, saved him. Afterward, he gives Vance's will to Jerry Edgar, his former partner, for safekeeping.
7	7	"One Of Your Own"	Hagar Ben-Asher	Naomi Iizuka & Benjamin Pitts	May 20, 2022
Chandler reveals she has no peace from Rogers being gone, while Willy Datz is shanked in prison and her boss and the FBI question her about it. When the FBI give details they couldn't know without having illegally recorded their conversation with Datz, she warns Bosch, who finds a bug in his office, and later hears rumors that the Bratva had Datz killed for talking to her, which are seemingly confirmed when an inmate with a Russian name is found to be the killer. Bosch investigates the murder of the doctor and is threatened by Gustafson. He is warned that Gustafson is a glory hound, and later discovers he didn't properly investigate the murder. When speaking to the family of the doctor, he finds that the doctor had a meeting with a medical board investigator which his family did not know about. In Vance's case, in the wake of Vance's death, Corwin fires Ida. Bosch is visited by the police, who question him about why Vance hired him. He lies, and tells them to investigate Sloan. When the friend of Dominick tells him the name of the paper the woman worked for, he investigates and finds the name of the woman, Gabriela Lida. When he tracks her down, she reveals the daughter she had with Dominick is an artist named Vibiana Veracruz, who has a son of her own, Gilberto, and they make plans for Bosch to meet her. As they depart, they are shown to be observed by Sloan. Meanwhile, Maddie hears about a break in committed by the same suspect in the rape case. She meets the rape victim again, but upsets her when she is unable to provide further information. While still in search of the suspect who shot Paulina, his girlfriend who wants out calls her mother for money, who tells the police, and a drop is set up. When they go to pick up the money, the police, including Maddie, attempt to arrest them, but the arrest goes horribly wrong as they are both shot dead.
8	8	"Bloodline"	Ernest Dickerson	Osokwe Vasquez	May 20, 2022
Bosch meets Vibiana, who agrees to do a DNA test to prove her heritage. She later finds that she is being observed by Sloan, and tells Bosch. When Bosch confronts Sloan, he informs him that he wants to help as per Vance's wishes, which Bosch accepts and lets him move Vibiana and her son to a safe house. Meanwhile, in the doctor's case, he speaks to the medical representative and finds the doctor discovered one of his employees was writing fake prescriptions for nonexistent patients and was killed before he had a chance to follow up, which the representative informed Gustafson about. Later, Bosch finds the wounds were precise enough for the killer to have had a background in medicine. Maddie is questioned about the shooting in a way that suggests the investigator believes the officers involved are guilty of misconduct, and is later informed by Bosch that SIS has a record of corruption. She helps a fellow officer, Rico Perez help out Paulina, and later hooks up with him. The next day, she and Vasquez arrest a man apparently breaking into a house, but he turns out not to be the rapist from her earlier case. Meanwhile, Chandler files a wrongful death suit against SIS for the death of the suspect's girlfriend. Speaking to her family, she gets the name of the SIS lieutenant, Spencer Cosgrove, and has Mo investigate him, finding that his ex-wife has a restraining order against him. She also attempts to contact Detective Morrison, the detective in the case, only to be rebuffed. Cosgrove later asks Morrison to support him, which he seemingly agrees to, but is later shown listening to a conversation he had with the victim's mother, possibly having second thoughts. Bosch discusses Vance's case with Chandler, and their conversation is overheard by Corwin and Creighton. Corwin worries about inheriting the company, suggests having Vibiana killed, and attempts to intimidate Creighton into helping him. Creighton later meets a foreign assassin, and tells her he has a job for her.
9	9	"Cat Got a Name?"	Kate Woods	Eric Overmyer	May 27, 2022
The woman Creighton hired investigates Bosch's office, and Bosch disables the bug in response. She later observes Chandler entering a genetic testing lab, which later mysteriously catches fire, though Chandler still confirms that Vibiana's DNA is a match for Vance. In the doctor's case, Bosch finds the name of the doctor writing fake prescriptions, but the homeless he prescribed them for do not have the pills. In Vance's case, Bosch visits Ida, tells her what was in the envelope, and asks her to sign an affidavit to establish authenticity. The police show up to investigate Bosch again in Vance's case. Knowing of Sloan's innocence now, he tells them about Vance's son, in exchange for them telling him Vance was murdered, and that Ida had access to his office and wrote his letters for him. When they show him pictures of the office that show the pen went missing after the murder, he realizes who killed Vance. He and Chandler have Ida sign the affidavit, and afterwards, reveal they know she killed Vance, and that she wrote the will. When they threaten to turn her in, she admits Vance asked her to write the will when he believed he was dying, and she put herself in it without his knowledge, but after he recovered and wanted to change it she killed him to prevent him from finding out, after which she is arrested. Meanwhile, investigating the rapist, Maddie and Vasquez discover a luchador mask that could belong to him, and Maddie calls a city inspector about what he may have seen, who is shown secretly looking at pictures of Maddie. Detective Morrison later admits to the police that he believes the suspect's girlfriend was innocent. Meanwhile, the hired assassin observes Sloan meeting Bosch, and informs Creighton that she will take care of it. That night, Vibiana calls Bosch and tells him Sloan seems suspicious. Bosch realizes she has been found and races to her building as the assassin enters it.
10	10	"Always/All Ways"	Adam Davidson	Michael Connelly & Titus Welliver	May 27, 2022
Bosch tricks the assassin and rescues Vibiana and her son, and has Mo recover camera footage showing the killer's face and gun. In the doctor's case, Bosch gives the evidence he has collected to Gustafson, including a video recorded by Mo of the doctor selling pills, ensuring the doctor's arrest, and afterwards, is sent a video of the woman killing Sloan. Bosch kidnaps Creighton, and uses tactics from Afghanistan to force him to reveal how to contact his assassin. Using Creighton and Mo, he sets a trap for the woman, and eventually manages to kill her. He then releases Creighton, but warns him he will be arrested if there are any further attempts on Vibiana's life. Afterwards, Chandler publicly reveals Vance had heirs, ensuring Bosch's threat. In the wrongful death suit, Chandler gets the body camera footage of the shooting, but Bosch tells her to leave Maddie out of it. She later shows Morrison that Cosgrove planted the gun and asks him to do the right thing. He gives her more information, on the condition that she does not settle. Meanwhile, Maddie sees and speaks to the city inspector who put up the notice, Kurt Dockweiler, which seems to unnerve him. Later, she and Vasquez find an injured man who dies, upsetting her. She is later visited by Chandler, who tells her the civil suit may destroy careers, and after she expresses disapproval, asks if she wants to see justice served. Maddie later meets Bosch, telling him how afraid she was when he didn't respond to her calls, and they reaffirm their bond. When she goes home, it appears someone else is in her apartment. At an exhibition by Vibiana that night, Chandler tells Bosch that Maddie may have to testify, as her camera saw Cosgrove plant the gun. Disgusted, Bosch leaves to meet Maddie. Arriving at her apartment, he finds it seemingly empty, with one window having a cut screen.

=== Season 2 (2023) ===
No. overall	No. in season	Title	Directed by	Written by	Original release date
11	1	"The Lady Vanishes"	Sharat Raju	Tom Bernardo	October 20, 2023
In a flashback, Maddie is attacked in her apartment by the Screen Cutter, revealed to be Kurt Dockweiler, who takes her to his truck and escapes with her. In the present, Edgar and Joan Bennett, working the case, allow Bosch to sit in while they brief their captain, and he hears that they believe the Screen Cutter to be her abductor. He is sent home after an outburst following the reveal that they have no leads. Bosch calls Mo on his way home and asks him to track any digital data of Maddie in the days before her abduction, nearly having a car accident while doing so. Finding Maddie's notebook, Edgar interviews Vasquez, who reveals she and Maddie interviewed Dockweiler. After Mank agrees to discreetly give him information on the case, Bosch gets a call about a corpse matching Maddie's description being found, but it isn't her. Mo tells him Maddie received a call from a burner phone, and a few calls from Chandler. He visits Chandler, finding she went to see Maddie and saw a man smoking outside, and has her see a sketch artist to describe the smoker. Meanwhile, Dockweiler brings Maddie to the desert and drugs her. Chandler expresses concern about Bosch to Mo, and Dockweiler is shown to have a contact in the police. Edgar and Bennett investigate Dockweiler's house, and find he is a smoker, but he sees them leave. They later match the sketch to a picture of Dockweiler from Maddie's body camera. In Bosch's presence, Chandler tells them Dockweiler was the smoker, and Bosch has Edgar discreetly give him the man's address. He goes to the inspector's house, but Dockweiler tricks him and escapes. Bosch investigates but leaves when Edgar texts him that the police are coming. After he leaves, Edgar calls him and reveals Dockweiler has turned himself in. However, Dockweiler refuses to tell them where Maddie is without a lawyer. Meanwhile, Maddie is shown buried in a coffin in the desert.
12	2	"Zzyzx"	Sharat Raju	Chris Downey	October 20, 2023
In the coffin, Maddie wakes up. Dockweiler agrees to give up Maddie's whereabouts in exchange for immunity. Hearing about this, Bosch asks Edgar to test his boots, based on evidence he found at the house. Crate and Barrel tail Dockweiler's lawyer, James Rafferty. Mo informs Bosch that Dockweiler wiped most of his hard drive, but left evidence that he searched the dosage of sedatives needed to knock out a human for four to six hours, before hacking his account activates an untraceable video link to a camera filming Maddie in the coffin, which is sent to the police and the media. Bosch tricks his way into meeting Dockweiler, and threatens him when he taunts him about escaping the house, but is stopped by Edgar, who covers for him and tells him the results of testing the boots, causing Bosch to realize Maddie is in the desert. Bosch asks Mo to inform Chandler about Rafferty and meet him at his office, and Edgar to investigate if Dockweiler has connections in law enforcement. Maddie starts running out of air and remembers seeing a plane before being tranquilized. Chandler informs Bosch that Rafferty is connected to Dockweiler, while Vasquez joins Mo at the office, witnessing Maddie carve something the letters EDW into the coffin. When Bosch arrives, he identifies it as Edwards Air Force Base, and asks Mo to get the flight paths for recent missions there. When a scorpion gets into the coffin, Maddie kills it, but notices the coffin slowly filling with sand. Chandler distracts Rafferty while Bosch breaks into his hotel room, finding evidence that he legally handled Dockweiler's adoption from a cult in the desert. Mo uses the cult's original location and the flight path data to narrow Maddie's location down to three square miles, and Chandler arranges for a helicopter to take them there. At the location, Bosch and Chandler find the computer sending the video signal, while Edgar interrogates Dockweiler, and realizes from a comment that he buried Maddie. He informs Bosch, who finds a tube buried in the sand. He digs around the tube and unearths the coffin, finding Maddie inside.
13	3	"Inside Man"	Patrick Cady	Naomi Iizuka	October 20, 2023
A city manager, Alexandra Parks, is found by her husband, sheriff's deputy Vince Harrick, brutally murdered. Four months later, Maddie is struggling to overcome her trauma. Bosch decides to restore his house himself. A man named David Foster is arrested for Parks' murder, and asks Chandler to represent him. Chandler is questioned by the FBI about Carl Rogers. She tells Bosch, who realizes they are the only ones involved who are being investigated and someone they worked with gave the FBI information. He asks Mo to look into Chandler's firm, while he confirms that Crate and Barrel have not given up any information and will plead the Fifth if questioned. Chandler questions Foster, but his alibi is not good, and she later discovers that his DNA was found at the crime scene. Mo discovers that an email of the shipping container Rogers attempted to escape in was sent from the firm to the FBI, and he and Bosch discover that Ramirez is the mole. Bosch tells Chandler, and they decide to try to feed him false information. Chandler hires Bosch to work the Parks case to maintain his attorney-client privilege. Two men blackmail a man they record having sex with a prostitute. Bosch discovers Parks' killer may have known her personally, while Chandler discovers Foster's alibi is a lie and that he is using drugs, and he gives her the name and contact information of his dealer. The FBI subpoena Bosch. James Allen, a prostitute and Foster's dealer, is picked up from a hookup and taken by someone he recognizes. Chandler agrees to get Bosch an interview with Foster, while the FBI decide to try to wiretap Bosch. Maddie, meanwhile, now on desk work, investigates a burglary, finding the thief and recovering the stolen valuables, impressing her superiors. She tells Paulina she didn't know when it would be right to come back, but eventually found her footing. At home, she sees Bosch working the Parks case and asks to see the pictures. He reluctantly allows it, and she realizes she is lucky she survived. He offers to help her with her statement for Dockweiler's sentencing, and admits he is working the case because it is similar to hers. In bed, Maddie is shown to sleep with a gun under her pillow.
14	4	"Musso & Frank"	Tawnia McKiernan	Osokwe Vasquez	October 20, 2023
To Bosch's displeasure, Maddie moves out, moving in with Rico Perez, though they decide to keep their relationship secret. Working the Parks case, Bosch discovers she seemingly had no enemies, while Chandler is unable to find Allen, but gives Bosch information he can use to find Allen's last address. When he goes to it, he discovers Allen is recently deceased and the detectives who worked the case are Rondell Pierce and Christina Vega, his old colleagues. They tell him Allen was strangled, possibly by a serial killer. The FBI continues to investigate Chandler, while Mo hacks Ramirez' phone to monitor all his communications. Maddie is promoted to the Crime Reduction Unit (CRU), and Mank informs Bosch about this, while she struggles with her statement for Dockweiler's sentencing. She celebrates with her coworkers, including Paulina, who is still not ready to return to work. Bosch and Chandler reconvene and are concerned about the case, and are observed by the two blackmailers, who are revealed to be detectives. When they leave, the detectives split up to follow them, and they discover Bosch's identity and arrange for Chandler to be arrested for a DUI, though she manage to avoid a substance test. The next day, Chandler is released by Mank, while Bosch and Rose meet with Foster and tell him about Allen's death, upon which he admits that they had a six-month long affair. Bosch picks up Chandler and tells her about the alibi, but they discover when picking up her car that it was opened after she was arrested and that someone looked at Foster's file. The FBI discovers Chandler was at Wakefield's house after he was killed and took his phone.
15	5	"Hollywood Forever"	Leslie Libman	Chris Wu	October 26, 2023
The blackmailers plant a tracking device on Bosch's car. Bosch tells Mo he believes Parks wore a watch that wasn't reported in the murder book. He investigates Parks' house, finding a receipt for the watch, and is accosted by her husband, who also informs him the watch was sent to be repaired. Bosch and Chandler investigate the hotel room Allen used, and find he and Foster were indeed a couple, and a picture missing from the room, which may have provided the wire used to strangle Allen. They also get a video showing the entrance to the hotel which shows a vehicle matching Foster's van was at the hotel at the time Parks was killed, though it does not show the driver or the plate number. Chandler tells Bosch she believes she saw the detective who arrested her earlier in the restaurant, while the blackmailers observe them. Meanwhile, on her first day, while Maddie still struggles to cope, she and Vasquez lose sight of a potential thief. Bosch congratulates Maddie on her promotion, while the blackmailers are shown to be using a jewelry shop to fence stolen goods. Mo attends a hacker's conference and meets a woman, while Bosch is accosted by the original investigators of the Parks case. The CRU catches two suspects, but Vasquez sees Maddie unnecessarily beat one of them and later warns her about this. Ramirez is revealed to work for the FBI to avoid prison. Bosch hears the FBI have taken over investigating Wakefield's murder and informs Chandler. The FBI interrogate Aslan about the pipe, and while he does not recognize Crate, Barrel or Mo, he identifies Bosch as the man who blew up the pipe.
16	6	"Dos Matadores"	Alex Zakrzewski	Emily Ragsdale	October 26, 2023
The blackmailers demand more money from a plastic surgeon, Dr. Schubert. Bosch and Chandler confront Ramirez, who admits the FBI caught him in a lie and he told them about the blueprint and Wakefield's phone. They ask him to keep them informed about the case. Chandler is summoned to a hearing to have Bosch removed from the case. At the hearing, Bosch is not removed, but the judge pressures Chandler to convince Foster to make a plea deal. Bosch asks Mo to look into Parks' calls to find anything about the watch. Meanwhile, Mo starts a relationship with the woman he met at the convention, Jade Quinn, and hears her ex-boyfriend stole her family's medical information and is blackmailing her with it. He plants a device in the company that has it, enabling him to get the information, impressing her. Bosch investigates Allen's murder, finding out from Pierce and Vega that he may have turned informant three years ago, that he didn't struggle when strangled and his personal effects were taken from his room. He later discovers the body was dumped by two people, and informs Chandler, also asking her to test the semen for CTE. Chandler convinces Foster not to take a deal. They then find out where Allen's things are, and Bosch discovers Allen was killed by someone he recognized, in a car similar to the car that dumped the body. Meanwhile, Maddie is asked to give a statement at Dockweiler's sentencing, and struggles to come to terms with being a victim, but is consoled by Chandler. At the sentencing, she affirms her survival and condemns Dockweiler, pleasing Bosch and Vasquez, though Perez becomes concerned about her moving out. Mo tells Bosch who Parks called about the watch, and Bosch decides to investigate himself. He visits the jewelry store, and realizes the owners are hiding something. As he leaves, he is shown observed by the blackmailers, who respond by killing the owners and staging it as a robbery.
17	7	"I Miss Vin Scully"	Haifaa al-Mansour	Benjamin Pitts	November 2, 2023
The blackmailers contemplate killing Bosch while keeping tabs on their competition. Chandler mails a letter, while Bosch investigates the watch, finding it was sold by the original owner, Dr. Schubert, but he lied to his wife that it was stolen to avoid her finding out about his gambling debts, and gets the doctor's number. Mo hacks the pharmaceutical company and gets Jade's information, later giving it back to her. Bosch is contacted by the police about the murders of the jewelry store owners, and brings Chandler to his interview, where they find the owners were killed in what looked like a robbery shortly after he left. Chandler shuts down the interview, but Bosch tells them about the watch, afterward telling her the killers may be watching them. Paulina returns to work, while Maddie is interviewed about her statement and later becomes emotional in front of her friends. The blackmailers investigate Bosch's house, finding Maddie is his daughter. They later give evidence of their competition to their handler, asking for the CRU's help in bringing them down. The letter Chandler mailed arrives at the LA Times, publicizing the information on the investigation into her, causing the grand jury to be delayed due to the Bratva's involvement. Bosch tells Maddie about his progress in the case, and later finds a recorded conversation between Parks and the jewelry store owners revealing she knew the watch was stolen. He is later informed by Pierce about the names of Allen's handlers, Ellis and Long. When Mo tells him the two have a history of surveillance, they find the bug on his car, but leave it. When arresting their competition, Ellis and Maddie are left alone, and he tricks her into revealing details about Bosch's progress in the case. She then sees him beat the suspect, but he convinces her not to report it. Chandler gets Allen's belongings and tells Bosch and Mo that Ellis and Long were the ones who arrested her. When she hears the recorded conversation, Bosch and Mo return to the jewelry store to look for proof of the watch being stolen. Ellis and Long observe them, having realized Bosch has found the bug. At the store, Bosch and Mo find a DVD. As they leave, Ellis and Long follow them, and accelerate toward their car.
18	8	"Seventy-Four Degrees in Belize"	Logan Kibens	Kevin Connaghan & Valerie Wakefield	November 2, 2023
Ellis and Long run Bosch and Mo off the road. In the hospital, a concussed Mo tells Bosch the car was silver, and loud, like the car used to dump Allen's body. The FBI get a warrant for Chandler's property, while Bosch, knowing he is compromised, destroys the bug. Bosch shows Chandler the DVD, footage of Ellis and Long threatening the store owners. He then finds the car at the body shop, and takes evidence from it. Chandler gets more video of the hotel entrance and is told about the warrant by Ramirez, who the FBI has realized is compromised. Maddie is interviewed by the FBI and learns about the pipe. She meets her father, but is upset when he doesn't tell her about it. Ellis and Long find out Bosch examined their car. Jade helps Mo recover, and he shows her the video he enhanced. Chandler has Foster moved to protective custody after he is beaten in jail, and she and Bosch view the video showing Ellis and Long's car at the hotel the night of Allen's murder. Bosch tells Chandler the FBI questioned Maddie, and she attempts to reassure him, while Ellis and Long decide to shut down their operation. Mo observes Ellis and Long's prostitutes with a client, while Bosch confronts Dr. Schubert at his house, recording him admitting he slept with a patient, and Ellis and Long blackmailed him with a video of it. Ellis and Long arrive, recognizing Bosch's car. Bosch attempts to protect the doctor, but he tries to surrender. Long kills him, and Bosch shoots Long. Ellis flees as the police, called by Bosch, arrive. After Long refuses to talk and is moved to the hospital, Bosch gives the recording to the police, who refuse to take it as evidence of anything. Afterward, he asks Chandler to set up the two prostitutes, who can testify to the extortion, at a safe house. When he meets Maddie, she admits she worked with Ellis and told him details of the Parks case. He tells her he would never lie to her. The FBI arrive at Bosch's and Chandler's homes and offices and find a recording of Chandler threatening Rogers after the pipe was blown up. Using this as evidence, they arrest Chandler.
19	9	"Escape Plan"	Ernest Dickerson	Michael Connelly & Titus Welliver	November 9, 2023
The FBI attempt to intimidate Chandler into taking a deal, but fail. Maddie reprimands her father about not taking protection and asks him what he has planned, but he is evasive. Ellis, hiding on a yacht, obtains a fake ID and arranges for a car, later taking a man hostage when he checks in on the boat. Chandler is bailed out by Rose and gives a statement to the media that she is being harassed, which is seen by the FBI, and Mo, who is watching the two prostitutes at the safe house. Chandler and Bosch give their findings in the Parks case to the DA, who refuses to accept it, and they realize he is avoiding admitting Foster is innocent due to the political embarrassment it would cause. At Chandler's hearing for the Rogers case, Chandler gets the charges against her dismissed by showing the FBI's probable cause was false, though Agent Barron, the lead agent in the case, warns her and Bosch they are not done. Leaving the courthouse, Bosch is tailed by someone and attempts to lose them, but it turns out to be Maddie when he is pulled over, and she tells him the CRU is watching him due to his refusal of protection. Mo tells Bosch the prostitutes are getting restless, and he tells Chandler, losing the police on his way to meet her. Maddie expresses her concerns about Bosch to Vasquez. The prostitutes reveal that Ellis and Long once blackmailed a man who gave them a boat, which Bosch uses Mo to track down at a marina. Maddie and Vasquez find where he is and head go themselves. At the marina, Bosch gets onto the boat and finds the captured man but is caught by Ellis. He fights back, and the commotion attracts Maddie and Vasquez, which culminates in Maddie shooting Ellis when he points a gun at her father, causing him and the gun to fall in the water. Bosch thanks Maddie, who expresses "I got you". Jade Quinn is revealed to be an undercover FBI agent, Janice Morrell, and Barron tells her to "move" on Mo.
20	10	"A Step Ahead"	Patrick Cady	Tom Bernardo & Eric Overmyer	November 9, 2023
Maddie gives a statement to the police and is worried when she is told that they haven't found Ellis' gun yet. She later tells her father she is angry with him for putting himself in danger. Chandler finds out Aslan is no longer cooperating with the FBI and is given the results of the CTE by Ramirez, but doesn't let him continue working for her. Morrell admits to Barron that she is becoming attached to Mo, even though they are planning to get him to give up Bosch and Chandler. Chandler tells her therapist she can live with what she has done. Bosch is informed that someone in prison was assaulted. Mo is arrested by the FBI, while Chandler presents the CTE and is allowed to argue third-party culpability at the trial. The FBI attempt to intimidate Mo, eventually giving him a week to turn in Bosch and Chandler. Maddie tells Perez she has found a place and is moving out, while Bosch and Chandler decide to get a confession from Long. Bosch tricks Long into confessing, but the confession is not taken as evidence by the DA, so Chandler threatens to release it to the media unless he drops Foster's charges. Afterward, she meets Irvin Irving, former chief of police, and asks him to endorse her for DA. The DA drops the case, while Maddie is informed that Dockweiler is dead, which Bosch tells her to let go. She visits her mother's memorial, speaking to Chandler afterward, and is told by Mank that Ellis' gun was found. Morell meets Mo, and he reveals that he knows who she really is and that he has ensured there is no evidence of him taking the files. He demands she quit the FBI or he will reveal her identity to the hackers. She claims that she did have feelings for him, but he doesn't believe her. Chandler announces to the media that she will run for DA. At home, Maddie answers Bosch's phone to hear Preston Borders, an inmate at the same prison as Dockweiler, say he has "taken care of it", implying that Bosch had Borders kill Dockweiler. Maddie asks Bosch what he has done.

=== Season 3 (2025) ===
No. overall	No. in season	Title	Directed by	Written by	Original release date
21	1	"Goes Where it Goes"	Sharat Raju	Eric Overmyer	March 27, 2025
Eight months after the end of the previous season, Chandler promises to change the system as district attorney. Emmett Archer, the current D.A., orders Robertson to investigate why Maddie never reported Borders' phone call to Bosch, privately imposing the need for discretion and questioning if he thinks Bosch could be guilty. Bosch meets a contact, who tells him no one is connected to Dockweiler's murder. Maddie and Vasquez investigate a follow-home in which a couple was robbed at gunpoint. Frank Sheehan, now out of prison, attempts to get legal help from Chandler, but she refuses. Robertson and his partner, Perry Lopez, run into Bosch and Maddie. Alone, Bosch reassures Maddie he didn't have Dockweiler killed, before she leaves and he gets a call from Chandler who tells him about Sheehan, before Mo provides them with evidence that Sheehan has been stalking her. Bosch tells her to be wary and later meets Sheehan's ex-wife, who tells him she and their son don't speak to him anymore. Maddie and Vasquez receive a description of the vehicle used in the robbery and later find the license plate, informing their superior. Robertson and Lopez discover a burner phone was found in Borders' cell after the phone call was made, later finding it was used to contact someone who lives in Bosch's neighborhood. When Chandler's car is vandalized, presumably by Sheehan, Bosch tells her to report it, and follows Sheehan, eventually confronting him. Sheehan denies stalking Chandler but makes clear he blames her for his troubles. Chandler attempts to garner support from the families of victims and the police, but does not get anywhere. Assisted by Crate and Barrel, Bosch and Mo find evidence in Sheehan's apartment that he may be planning a mass shooting. Bosch sets up security at a rally which will be attended by both Chandler and the mayor. During the rally, Barrel informs Bosch that Sheehan has gone missing. After shots are fired, Bosch has Maddie secure Chandler, then, realizing what Sheehan's plan is, traps him. He seemingly manages to talk Sheehan into surrendering, but Sheehan commits suicide instead. Maddie and Vasquez find Bosch sitting in shock next to Sheehan's corpse.
22	2	"Bosching Bosch"	Sharat Raju	Tom Bernardo & Kyle Long	March 27, 2025
Bosch attends the funeral of a soldier he served with in Afghanistan. Afterwards, Maddie arrives, and at the wake, is unnerved when another former soldier, Ken Gurbizs, tells her about Bosch presumably torturing and killing an enemy bomber. Returning to his office, Bosch meets a woman, Siobhan Murphy, who tells him her daughter and her family have been missing for a month and asks him to investigate it. Robertson and Lopez find out from Dockweiler's lawyer that Bosch assaulted him in the interview room. Chandler attempts to get donors at a fundraiser. Maddie declines a call from her father and visits Chandler, confiding in her about the story, and Chandler tells her not to judge her father harshly. The robbers are revealed to have been using their girlfriend to scope out people to rob. Robertson and Lopez inform Mank they know he deleted the video of Bosch assaulting Dockweiler and force him to give a copy to them which they view, upsetting Robertson. While reviewing video of the missing family, Bosch is contacted by Chandler, who asks him to prove she was neglected by the police in the matter of Sheehan. He then locates the family's car and is informed by the detective investigating their disappearance that they seemingly fled to Mexico following the father embezzling funds from his company. Chandler secures a lead for a potential donor with the help of her daughter. Maddie and Vasquez catch the woman assisting the robbers, who lets slip the name of one of them, Nestor Gomez. Robertson tells Lopez about Bosch's role in Edward Gunn's murder and they break into his office to find evidence, discovering a thank you note from a family of the contact, Curtis Dignan, who Bosch recommended for parole. Bosch tells Siobhan he doubts her family is in Mexico, and at their house, introduces her to Mo, who shows them security footage of the family leaving on the day they went missing. Maddie and Vasquez, with their new information, question the couple that was robbed, but get nowhere, while the woman tells her accomplices they need a new car and to start robbing in a different neighborhood. Mank meets Bosch, telling him the LAPD ignored a threat to Chandler to avoid seeming to support her, but doesn't tell him about Robertson and Lopez' investigation. Robertson and Lopez inform Archer about Dignan, who may have been a go-between for Bosch and Borders, and after Borders' wife refuses to speak to them, they ask Maddie about the call, and the former tells her to keep the investigation discreet. Bosch confronts Lieutenant Thorne for ignoring the threat against Chandler, and Chandler attempts to blackmail the chief into supporting her, but they are both stonewalled. Bosch and Siobhan travel to the family's vacation home, and find evidence suggesting they didn't leave willingly.
23	3	"Blankie"	Tawnia McKiernan	Brian Anthony & Emily Ragsdale	March 27, 2025
One month prior, Siobhan's granddaughter Kerry is kidnapped from the vacation home by a masked assailant. In the present, the police find no evidence in the house, and Bosch informs Siobhan, before returning to LA to investigate her son-in-law Stephen's company. After finding Bosch has a card with which he withdraws money regularly, which may have been given to Borders, Robertson and Lopez head to Wasco to interview the inmate, informing their superior they have spoken to Maddie. Maddie tells Vasquez about the investigation. Bosch speaks to Sheila Walsh and Finbar McShane, Stephen's business partners, who admit Stephen was embezzling the company and give him records. Chandler prepares for a debate in the election. Robertson and Lopez interview Borders, who implies Bosch called him but refuses to give up any information without a deal. After Siobhan attempts to perform her own investigation, Bosch tells her to return to LA. Archer agrees to get Borders in front of a grand jury. Mo tells Bosch, after investigating the records, that one employee was paid but didn't actually work at the company: Sheila's drug-addicted ex-con son, who maintains Stephen was stealing the company's money. After interrogating him, Bosch returns to the company office and plants a bug. Victoria, the woman aiding the robbers, fences some of the jewelry but keeps more of the money for herself, upsetting the thieves. At the debate, Archer mentions the investigation into Bosch to discredit Chandler, which Bosch hears. He calls Maddie and is immediately afterward served with a subpoena for the grand jury. He meets Maddie, and she tells him about Robertson questioning her. He tells her to report he visited her, but she asks him to leave after he swears on her mother's memory he didn't kill Dockweiler, also mentioning Afghanistan. He meets Chandler and tells her about the subpoena. Borders tells his wife he will see her soon. The next day, Mo sends Bosch audio from the office implying McShane and Walsh are still involved in shady business. The chief tells Robertson and Lopez to use Dignan to get to Bosch, but they witness Bosch telling Dignan how to avoid them, and Robertson decides to adjust their strategy. The robbers ignore advice from Victoria and rob a couple where the man has a gun. Investigating the robbery, Maddie finds one of the robbers goes by "Flaco". Chandler loses voters due to the debate. Bosch and Mo, following up on the audio, witness McShane making a deal with someone intimidating him. Chandler meets an informant in the D.A.'s office, who she presses to get information on the investigation into Bosch. Siobhan's family are taken to the woods in the back of a car, and their kidnapper takes Kerry out of the trunk and takes her away.
24	4	"Whippoorwills"	Alex Zakrzewski	Alexa Junge	March 27, 2025
Robertson and Lopez pick up Dignan, but he refuses to cooperate, so Archer tells them to use Borders to intimidate him. Mo tells Bosch that McShane's deal was with Bing Crider, a former gangster rumored to still be shady. Chandler's PR team tell her to distance herself from Bosch. She refuses, and tries to get support from the LA Times, but is rejected. She informs Bosch of the call records and money trail leading to Borders, which he denies involvement with, but she seems to suspect him of something. Bosch calls Maddie, who declines and tells Vasquez she wants to ask her father about Dockweiler but doesn't trust him to tell the truth. Mo discreetly gets Crider's business information. Bringing Borders down from Wasco, Robertson and Lopez imply Dignan ratted him out. Crider sets up another deal. Chandler meets her contact at the Times, Scott Anderson, who agrees to bring her concerns to the board. Maddie and Vasquez hear about a new crew selling quality merchandise, presumably the robbers. Bosch interrogates Crider and finds McShane set up the deal to sell equipment for half price and tells Mo the former gangster has an alibi for the night the family went missing. Vasquez and Maddie find the plate belonging to the car the robbers are using. Bosch asks Walsh about McShane, but she stonewalls him. The next day, Bosch is questioned by the grand jury, but invokes the fifth amendment when asked about Dignan. McShane finds out from Siobhan that she knows her family was at the cabin. Maddie is hit on by a public defender and informed by Mank that she may be in trouble. On the way to the grand jury, Borders is seen by Rita, who appears to have plans with another contact. When he is questioned, he refuses to admit he called Bosch. Chandler gives a statement to the LA Times board. Bosch notices Rita outside the building and tells Robertson and Lopez, who brush it off. Walsh discreetly investigates McShane. Maddie tells Vasquez IA is investigating her and confides her worries about her father. Walsh discovers McShane is embezzling the company, and calls Bosch, who misses the call, but is discovered by McShane. Bosch notices Rita signaling another car as Robertson and Lopez take Borders away, and he follows it as it trails them. The car Bosch followed cooperates with another to cause Robertson and Lopez to crash, and the drivers release Borders, before Bosch arrives and attempts to detain them, assisted by Robertson and Lopez. The drivers are killed and Borders flees, pursued by Bosch and Robertson. Bosch follows him into a warehouse, but he manages to subdue Bosch. Holding him at gunpoint, Borders admits he killed Dockweiler before he is shot dead by Robertson, who promises to help Bosch clear his name. Bosch reconciles with Maddie, while Chandler uses result of the case to smear Archer. Rita realizes Borders is gone, while Bosch listens to Walsh's message. He goes to the company office to meet her, but finds it empty, eventually finding her dead and McShane missing.
25	5	"F***ing Politics"	Ernest Dickerson	Kyle Long	April 3, 2025
Bosch tells the police he thinks Walsh's murder is connected to the family's disappearance. McShane is taken to safety by two accomplices. Rita, having fled town, sees a news report that the police are looking for her following Borders' death. Bosch finds the burner phone Borders called hidden at his house and informs Robertson. Chandler attempts to get more votes and is refused by a man whose son was murdered. Maddie is questioned by IA about Borders' call, admitting she didn't report it. Afterward, Bosch tells her he had Dignan harass Dockweiler, but Borders found out and killed the latter to frame Bosch, which upsets her. Archer tells Robertson not to close the case until after the election, which he and Lopez disagree with. Bosch and Mo discuss the missing family and realize the corpses must be near the cabin. Investigating the video, they realize McShane used construction equipment to bury them. Maddie and Vasquez find the pawnshop owner Victoria sells merchandise to, and persuade him to inform them if she returns. Bosch investigates the construction equipment McShane sold to Crider, finding a tracker. Robertson and Lopez follow up on the accomplices, finding an address, which they arrest Rita at. Chandler finds out the man's son actually died of an overdose. When she confronts him, he admits his son was injected by his boyfriend, a prominent city councilman who the police refused to investigate. Bosch and Mo investigate the location the equipment was moved to and find the place the family was buried. Robertson and Lopez inform the chief Archer ordered them to slow the case and persuade Rita to admit that Bosch had nothing to do with Dockweiler's murder. Victoria calls the pawnshop owner and suspects he may be compromised. Robertson gives the results of the investigation to Scott Anderson, ensuring it will be published in the LA Times. Victoria and Albert set a trap for the police, confirming that the pawnshop is compromised. Bosch identifies the family's corpses and informs Siobhan. On election day, Chandler surges in the polls, while Archer is questioned on why Bosch is still under investigation. Maddie sees the report of the family's murder and consoles her father. Vasquez's nephew is revealed to be Albert. Maddie meets the public defender again, while Chandler, after stressing about the election, finds that she has won. Bosch and Robertson reconcile, and the latter promises to keep Bosch informed about the police investigation into the family's murder. Shortly after, Robertson is shot and killed in a mugging.
26	6	"Broken Order"	Adam Davidson	Brian Anthony	April 3, 2025
A month after the election, the man believed to have killed Robertson, Diego Perra, is arrested. Maddie consoles Bosch over the matter, and Mo shows him that McShane is in the wind. Bosch asks him to find out where he got the money to buy his percentage of the business. The police, including Maddie, express hope for Perra to get the death penalty. Chandler meets the team prosecuting Perra and finds that, while the case is solid, they cannot prove Perra knew Robertson was a cop. They attempt to get an undercover cop to get Perra to confess, but he only admits to multiple other robberies, not Robertson's murder. Nestor persuades Victoria to let him sell some of the stolen merchandise they still have. Perra's lawyer shows Chandler evidence seemingly proving Perra has been framed. Chandler shows the footage to Bosch, asking for his help. Nestor attempts to sell a watch but is refused by a pawnshop owner. Chandler has Mo investigate the councilman, finding he seems to have a type, and is forced to stall when the chief of police asks about the case against Perra. Bosch and Mo investigate the witnesses, finding one who wasn't questioned, who tells them the shooter would have seen Robertson's badge and gun when he reached for his wallet, causing them to doubt Perra's guilt. Chandler, against the wishes of her team, demands more evidence to prove or contradict the video before they file the charges. Maddie and Vasquez get Nestor's picture from the pawnshop owner, and inform their superior they intend to wiretap Victoria to get evidence against her. Chandler struggles to keep her team on her side, even with more evidence against Perra. Maddie and Vasquez interrogate Victoria at her family's restaurant, confronting her with the information they have, but she denies involvement. Bosch and Mo discover that the cameras which would have shown the robbery were all tampered with, suggesting the murder was not random. Bosch promises to keep Siobhan updated on the investigation into McShane. Maddie and Vasquez decide to ambush Victoria when she sets up a meeting. Mo informs Bosch that McShane bought his stake in the business using the insurance settlement of a prior business, but that there are many sealed federal records relating to that case. Chandler regains the respect of her team. Vasquez witnesses Victoria meeting Albert, but lies about not recognizing him when Maddie asks her. Bosch tells Chandler he believes Robertson was assassinated.
27	7	"Welcome to the Other Side"	Katrelle N. Kindred	Emily Ragsdale	April 10, 2025
At Perra's initial hearing, Chandler only charges him with multiple robberies, not murder, upsetting the public. Vasquez discreetly takes records of Albert's calls. Bosch doubts Mo will be able to get the federal records in McShane's case, but Mo believes he can. Chief Hughes reprimands Chandler for not charging Perra with Robertson's murder, so the team attempts to get more evidence against him. Maddie finds Vasquez called in sick, and tails Nestor. Bosch, retracing Robertson's steps, speaks to his former lover, and finds a note that Robertson was meeting someone at the location he was killed at. Vasquez confronts Albert with the evidence against Nestor and Victoria, but he denies involvement, to her displeasure. Mo discreetly reaches out to Janice Morrell. The councilman, Patrick Currey, is informed someone is investigating him. Bosch tells his DEA acquaintance Charlie Hovan about Robertson, suspecting he was investigating a drug case, and gets Robertson's current cases from Lopez. Perra's girlfriend tells Chandler's team Perra didn't know about the drawer the gun was hidden in, and that someone broke into her home the night of the murder but didn't steal anything. Bosch finds Robertson was investigating a drug case with an unidentified male victim. Chandler is told that Currey wants to meet her. Vasquez finds out from her sister that Albert visits their grandfather regularly. Mo meets Janice and tries to persuade her to give him the file. Tailing Nestor, Maddie records him meeting with Albert. Bosch and Lopez find the drug case victim was killed and dumped three hours later, and that he had only a blank key card on him at the time, but some unidentified substance under his fingernails. Chandler meets Currey, and he subtly threatens her. Meeting her grandfather, Vasquez finds Albert brings Victoria on his visits, and finds stolen merchandise hidden in a closet. Bosch and Lopez have Mo trace the key card to a hotel in Lancaster. Chandler finds Perra's DNA was not on the bullets, but that of an unidentified male was. Albert meets a fence to arrange selling more merchandise. Maddie discovers the missing call records, and Albert's name, also finding that he is related to Vasquez. She tells Bosch she has a feeling about another cop protecting a felon, and he tells her she needs to make a choice, but it is possible the other cop may still do the right thing when the time comes. Albert asks Victoria to leave town with him, but she finds he is related to Vasquez. Janice gives Mo the file, and reveals McShane had an accomplice who was ex-FBI. When she asks him why he didn't turn her in, he answers ambiguously. Maddie confronts Vasquez and tells her about Albert. Hovan tells Bosch that Robertson was working with a DEA agent, which Bosch surmises was the reason he went to the location at which he was murdered. He tells Chandler, and she gets a call that the unidentified male DNA was matched to Robertson's case, confirming that Robertson was assassinated.
28	8	"La Zona Rosa"	Patrick Cady	Kevin Connaghan & Janet Thielke	April 10, 2025
Several Mexicans are taken to work for a man who violently beats one of them for being late. With Maddie's support, Vasquez reports Albert to her superiors. Chandler tells Perra's lawyer about the new evidence, and offers a deal in exchange for what Perra knows about the real killer. Bosch finds that the substance under the victim's fingernails was manufactured by a company in Lancaster, and he and Lopez decide to check it out. Vasquez becomes more stressed about Albert after talking to her sister. Bosch asks Gurbizs to help him track McShane's FBI accomplice. Victoria confesses the truth to her parents. The man forcing the Mexicans to work for him is told the case against Perra is stalling. The police attempt to lure Albert into a trap, but he figures it out. In Lancaster, Bosch and Lopez investigate the company the substance came from, and the manager does not recognize the victim, while the man, shown to be an employee, sees them investigating. Perra confesses he attacks trucks unless they pay a drug cartel called El Fuerte for protection and he was told to stay away from Robertson's murder site that night, but doesn't know the name of the leader, though is willing to give a composite. The man is revealed to be working with a sheriff's deputy in Lancaster, who he threatens. Vasquez discovers the trap is compromised, with Victoria having taken the merchandise. The sheriff's deputy, Jack Garrity, reports Bosch and Lopez to the LAPD, while Albert and Nestor find Victoria has moved the time to transfer the merchandise to the fence. Perra identifies the man as the boss. Bosch and Lopez are denied access to the dead man's hotel room, and Lopez is called back to LA. Maddie and Vasquez speak to Victoria's parents, who give them a burner that can contact Victoria. Mo witnesses the man taking the Mexican laborers away. Using Perra's info, Hovan informs Chandler that the man is Humberto Zorillo, head of El Fuerte. Bosch finds that after the victim disappeared, his room was searched, and the Lancaster sheriff's department is corrupt. Chandler sends Bosch a photo of Zorillo, causing him to realize the drug lord killed Robertson personally. The police set a trap for Victoria. Chief Huges tells Lopez she knows Bosch is involved in his own investigation into Robertson's murder. Bosch tells Mo he thinks the victim was killed for stealing drugs. Nestor and Albert confront Victoria when she tries to sell the merchandise. The fence leaves, and Victoria reveals Albert's aunt is a cop, causing Nestor to flee with all the money, and he is shot and killed by the police when they attempt to arrest him. Victoria and Albert flee, and run into Maddie and Vasquez, forcing the latter to arrest her nephew herself. Bosch and Mo investigate the victim's room and find drugs, calling Garrity to come collect them. When Zorillo arrives instead, Bosch prepares to shoot him, but the drug lord flees before he can.
29	9	"Badlands"	Adam Davidson	Tom Bernardo	April 17, 2025
Zorillo breaks into Garrity's house, intending to kill him, but gets a call from someone giving him orders and leaves. Garrity, having witnessed this, is caught by Bosch, who intimidates him into giving information in exchange for protective custody. Vasquez encourages Albert to take a deal, and worries about her own position in her family. Bosch delivers Garrity to Chandler and gets a call from Gurbizs. Garrity confesses he set up Robertson to be killed by Zorillo and that he can deliver the drug lord's location and DNA. Bosch and Gurbizs catch McShane's FBI accomplice and force him to give them McShane's new identity. Mo tracks the movements of the alias and they determine where in Mexico to find him. Maddie finds out, and asks her father to bring McShane back alive. After Bosch struggles to agree to this, she asks Gurbizs to bring her father home. Hughes pressures Chandler to give Zorillo the death penalty. Zorillo, realizing Garrity is compromised, shuts down his operation, which the man he calls tells him will cost millions. Vasquez acts indifferently to Maddie. Currey does drugs with another man and flees when things go wrong, but is seen and reported, and the man is saved by Maddie and Vasquez. Bosch, Mo and Gurbizs arrive in Mexico and investigate a bar, where they find McShane's location. Vasquez speaks to her sister, who blames her for Albert's arrest and rejects her. Currey is given Chandler's psychological records as leverage should he ever need it. Vasquez, in Maddie's presence, gets into a bar fight, struggling to cope with her familial situation. Zorillo, while relocating the operation, is arrested by the DEA, including Hovan, who tells Bosch. They both realize from the fact that he didn't just flee that he was under orders from someone else, and Chandler is later informed that the federal government has taken over the case. Gurbizs confronts Bosch, who promises to bring McShane back alive. When Mo tells them McShane plans to leave, they capture him. The next day, they find the police coming, and realize their way out of Mexico is compromised. Bosch decides to lie low, but McShane taunts them with details of the murders, and Gurbizs kills him after Bosch nearly does. Back in LA, Bosch informs Siobhan in vague terms that McShane is gone. Maddie arrives, and he tells her the truth after she presses him. They agree, sadly, that the case is closed.
30	10	"Dig Down"	Jet Wilkinson	Michael Connelly & Mitzi Roberts	April 17, 2025
At a restaurant, Bosch consoles Maddie over Vasquez' change in attitude. Leaving, he is followed by another car, which Mo confirms contains only one person. Bosch gets to his office and confronts his follower, Detective Renee Ballard, who demands files he seemingly stole of three similar murder cases, Filipino prostitutes called "The Flower Girls". Bosch reveals he didn't steal the files, but made copies of them, and Ballard says the originals are missing. Bosch realizes she needs them because another victim has been killed, and offers to give her his copies if she lets him on the case. Her superior instead orders her to serve Bosch a warrant. Chandler confronts Chief Hughes on giving Zorillo to the government, and Bosch sets up a meeting with Ballard, but is informed by Chandler about the warrant. When he meets Ballard, he tells her Chandler has issued orders for the case. Ballard brings the new file to his house and tells him about the similarities, confirming they were all done by the same killer. The next day, after reviewing the files, they wonder why there was a thirteen year gap between the new victim and the others, and consider the killer might have been a cop to have access to the files. Ballard leaves, planting a tracker on Bosch's car. Ballard's captain orders her not to reveal to Bosch the DNA evidence in the new victim's case, and tells her to arrest him when he crosses a line. Bosch and Mo book a date with a prostitute to talk to her handler, but Ballard stops them and warns him not to interfere further. Bosch calls off the plan and asks Mo to check his car. He tells Maddie what is happening, including that his mother was for a time unidentified like the victims, and she helps, finding that the same paramedic, Jeremy McKee was a first responder to two of the murders, including the recent one, and that he comes into the station frequently. Bosch asks Mo to look into McKee's background, and they bring Crate and Barrel in on the investigation. The next day, he informs Ballard, and she mentions the DNA, causing him to decide to move immediately. Mo plants a tracker on McKee's truck, but Ballard fails to get his DNA, so Bosch has Maddie and Vasquez do it, but Chandler tells them that DNA won't prove anything if he was the paramedic who checked the bodies. While Bosch and Ballard continue following McKee, Mo breaks into his house, finding the files, while McKee escapes when the battery in the tracker dies. Mo informs Bosch, and he and Ballard look for McKee in the neighborhood the murders occurred in. Ballard confronts Bosch about Mo breaking into the house and he defends himself by mentioning the tracker she put on his car. Mo hacks McKee's computer and finds the address he is headed to, and Bosch and Ballard arrive in time to save the victim. Later, they give the evidence to Chandler. Bosch suggests they may work together again, but Ballard is reluctant, pointing out that he has become darker as a result of investigating murderers, and tells him to be safe.

== Production ==
After the conclusion of Bosch, producers began discussing a new series that would feature Harry after his retirement from the LAPD, as happens in the later Bosch novels. Welliver admits that it is essentially Bosch season 8, but the focus is different: Harry is no longer a cop, and the main characters are Bosch, Maddie, and Chandler.

In April 2026, Titus Welliver stated that discussions were ongoing regarding a potential fourth season of Bosch: Legacy. He noted that while conversations had taken place between himself, Michael Connelly, and producer Henrik Bastin, no official renewal or greenlight had been issued.

Welliver indicated that early ideas for a continuation had been explored, though development remained in preliminary stages. As of April 2026, the series had neither been renewed nor cancelled, and its future remained uncertain.

== Reception ==
On Rotten Tomatoes, the first season has a score of 100% with an average score of 7.4/10, based on reviews from 17 critics. The website's critics consensus reads: "Television's grumpiest detective keeps his Legacy alive and well in a reboot that picks up right where the original series left off while pleasingly tweaking the formula." On Metacritic, the first season has a weighted average score of 76 out of 100 based on reviews from five critics, indicating "generally favorable reviews".

On Rotten Tomatoes, season two has a score of 100% based on reviews from 7 critics. On Metacritic, season two has a score of 71 out of 100 based on reviews from four critics, indicating "generally favorable reviews".

On Rotten Tomatoes, season three has a score of 100% based on reviews from 6 critics.

=== Audience viewership ===
Season one delivered more total viewers in the first 28 days post premiere, than any previous season of Bosch in their respective first 28 days in the US.
