= After (2012 film) =

- Directed by: Ryan Smith
- Screenplay by: Ryan Smith
- Story by: Ryan Scem; Jason Parish
- Produced by: Brandon Gregory
- Starring: Steven Strait; Karolina Wydra; Sandra Lafferty; Madison Lintz; Chase Presley; Jackson Walker
- Cinematography: Blake McClure
- Edited by: David Kiern
- Music by: Tyler Smith
- Production company: Seabourne Pictures
- Release dates: April 19, 2012 (Nashville Film Festival); September 14, 2012 (United States)
- Running time: 90 minutes
- Country: United States
- Language: English

After is a 2012 fantasy horror film written and directed by Ryan Whitaker (credited here as Ryan Smith) and starring Steven Strait and Karolina Wydra. It premiered at the 43rd Annual Nashville Film Festival on April 19, 2012. Canadian distributor Mongrel Media acquired the North American rights to the film in June 2013.

Ana and Freddy, survivors of a bus crash, find their town deserted and surrounded by The Darkness, a moving wall of black fog, which slowly encroaches on the town center. They speculate about their strange shared reality as they struggle with inexplicable occurrences of time travel, the search for a key to unlock a magic door, and attacks by a formidably toothed monster, to stave off Ana's death.

== Plot ==
In 2012, Ana, a nurse who once wanted to write horror fiction, meets Freddy on a bus. Freddy, a graphic novelist, chats her up. Surprisingly, they live on the same street in a small town, Pearl, but their conversation is cut off when the bus crashes. Ana wakes up at home, late for work. Though it is daytime, it appears to be twilight. When she arrives at the hospital, it is deserted, though she hears an enigmatic, barely-intelligible audio recording from a wall of patient health-monitors. Outside, loud music draws her to Freddy's house. The two go exploring.

At the police station, they find all communications channels dead. They cannot drive far because of a tall wall of black fog, The Darkness, through which lightning flickers. It encircles Pearl and menacingly advances toward their street. Unable to drive through it, they retreat to the center of town, which inexplicably reverts to August 23, 1992. At a diner, Freddy unsuccessfully attempts to get the attention of passers-by. Ana watches herself as a child celebrating her 11th birthday with her beloved Aunt Lu, who raised her. While Aunt Lu wants to talk, Ana persists in writing a story about a knight and a monster. Outdoors, Freddy finds a flyer for a carnival at the Pearl Fairgrounds.

Shifting back to 2012, they return to the fog, and Freddy measures its rate of creep; it will reach the town center in three days. They conjecture about their situation and whether they died in the crash. Ana thinks they might be spirits; Freddy suggests alternate dimensions and parallel universes. Remembering the audio recording at the hospital, Ana brings Freddy there. They are surprised to hear a real-time conversation in which doctors discuss cutting off life support for Ana in three days, as she has been in a coma for two months. Ana explains that after her Aunt Lu's own protracted coma and death, she signed a living will.

Freddy speculates that the fog is a representation of Ana's dying brain. He suggests that the only escape from their predicament is through The Darkness, though proximity to it sickens them. They enter it and find a locked door surrounded by thousands of keys; Freddy experiences déjà vu. A horrific monster appears and chases them, but they manage to escape. Freddy takes her to his childhood home to find a boat, hoping they can escape by river. His house is lit up, and it is August 23, 1992 again. He relives an incident in which his kind stepfather, Phil, attempted to bond with him after Freddy got in trouble at school. Phil suggests a game of ball, but (like Ana earlier) Freddy wants to keep writing his comic book. Phil tells Freddy that he can go to the carnival that night with friends.

They revert to 2012 and discuss the pleasures of story-telling. Freddy shows Ana the comic book he'd made, Behind the Veil, containing his illustration of a locked door and thousands of keys. In turn, Ana shows him her drama about the monster. Realizing that they must replay the day that changed their lives, the two go to the carnival. Young Ana takes joy in her time with Aunt Lu, who says that when they return home, they will have fun acting out Ana's story. Freddy sees his younger self with schoolmates, bigger boys who harass him and then dare him to go to a "real haunted house." As they leave, Ana and Freddy observe an exchange of glances demonstrating a mutual attraction between their younger selves. Ana tells him her Aunt Lu died in a terrible accident that night and that they are reliving the events in order.

Roaring, the monster reappears and they run, reverting to 2012. They hide in a school, where Freddy for the first time sees the creature from young Ana's play: it has an enormous mouth full of long teeth, and the key to the locked door is in its chest. They set a trap, but it fails, and they hole up in the movie theater and then the church, knowing that The Darkness will envelop them in the next few hours. As Ana becomes increasingly ill, Freddy leaves to confront the monster by himself. Ana is horrified to see it drag him away, and then she is back home in 1992.

There, young Ana is performing her play with Aunt Lu, herself as the knight and Lu as the monster. During the play's climax, Freddy's friends coerce him into petty vandalism that results in an accidental fire and Aunt Lu's coma. Back in 2012, a bloody and battered Freddy appears and apologizes before sinking into unconsciousness. When the monster appears, Ana kills it and takes the crucial key from its corpse. The Darkness creeps through the windows, but she drags Freddy to his magic door inside the fog, and when the key opens it, she pulls him across the threshold. In the hospital, Ana wakes up and staggers to find Freddy, whom she learns has already been released. His caretaker explains that Freddy has partial amnesia and remembers little except the crash itself. Using his sketchbook and an emotional embrace, Ana helps him to remember their shared experiences.

== Cast ==
- Steven Strait as Freddy
- Karolina Wydra as Ana
- Sandra Lafferty as Aunt Lu
- Madison Lintz as Young Ana
- Chase Presley as Young Freddy
- Jackson Walker as Phil

== Production ==
As best friends, director/scriptwriter Ryan Smith and producer Brandon Gregory agreed to take their time with production, which eventually took three years. Except for the actual filming, Smith told a Williamson Herald interviewer, pre-production and post-production were all created in their home base of Nashville, Tennessee: "Most of the film was made in house. We are proud Tennessee filmmakers — really proud to be a part of the film industry in Nashville. Other than shooting in Alabama, it's a Tennessee production."

=== Writing ===
Smith spent a year of that time writing the script. He told the Williamson Herald, "The idea came out of a Twilight Zone episode. We like to say it's a Sci-fi thriller. Two people meet on a bus, strike up a conversation and realize they live on the same street."

=== Casting ===
Sabyn Mayfield, son of casting director Laray Mayfield, was an old friend of Steven Strait and invited him to read the script. Since Strait had liked Smith's 2009 short film Devil's Shoestring, he was intrigued. He told Collider, "I read it and I was just blown away by how original and intelligent and unpretentious the script and the story was, and how heartfelt yet philosophical it seemed to be. It all wrapped up very well and really clean, in a lean way without Ryan trying to push too much into the pot. It all just seemed to be very graceful."

=== Filming ===
Location filming began on November 26 and wrapped in December of 2010. Principal photography took place in the cities of Birmingham and Decatur, Alabama. Additional scenes were shot in the nearby towns of Bessemer and Clanton. Director Ryan Smith told an interviewer that he wanted "a quintessential, small American town" and originally planned to film in his home city of Franklin, Tennessee, where production company Seabourne Pictures is based.

He decided to shoot in Alabama after talking with Birmingham filmmaker Jon Erwin, who told Smith about Alabama's tax incentives. "The new film incentives were a huge draw for us... We had lunch with Jon, and by the end of lunch, he had talked us into shooting in Alabama."

The diner that young Ana visits with Aunt Lu was John's City Diner in downtown Birmingham (it closed in 2023). Freddy and Ana seek sanctuary from the monster within St. Andrew's Episcopal Church in the historic Southside community.

== Themes ==
James Gracey of the Exquisite Terror site writes that the movie holds "engaging themes of destiny, fate, and redemption": "As the story progresses, interesting ideas regarding redemption and guilt are swirled into the mix, becoming more prominent as the narrative, spliced as it is by the occasional flashback, reveals the extent of which the paths of the pair have previously crossed and become entwined. This is where the film's power lies."

Steven Strait considers the movie to be about the nature of reality and life. He told Collider,

It has a lot of different elements to it. At its core, it's a sci-fi/existential thriller. It does have scarier moments, but it's not really a horror movie, in any way. It definitely had concepts that you don't generally see [in] films, these days, that are at least released with a script that is really purely based on these questions of, "Where are we? Why are we here? Why are we both here together?" He was trying to explore these philosophical ideals in a fun way without it hitting you over the head with any kind of intelligencia or pretension. ... We talked about how these two people or souls, or whatever you want to call them, get trapped in this place and they don't quite know what it is or where they are or what's happened... and they need to figure out a way out and figure out why they're there, in the first place, and figure out why they're there together.

== Cultural references ==
Ana has a copy of the Epic of Gilgamesh at her bedside.

The movie theater where Freddy works is showing The Night of the Hunter.

== Reception ==
After received mixed to positive reviews, with the more positive comments from sites devoted to horror films. Blood Red Reviews gave an enthusiastic score of 97/100, saying, "It's highly original, yet still follows all the classic horror rules." Martin Hafer of INFLUX Magazine similarly gave a rating of 9/5 out of 10, calling the plot "taut and engaging" and the actors "really believable and likable."

Lizzie Duncan of Horror News.Net wrote, "It is always nice to see a film that successfully combines a variety of genres, and After does just that – with elements of sci-fi, horror and romance all featuring at some point or another... After is a thriller at heart, and is very much a character driven piece, managing to remain gripping throughout despite only two characters being present for most of the screen-time. ... Director Ryan Smith and main actors, Steven Strait and Karolina Wydra, must be praised for their work on After. Despite the fact that it is a relatively simple story, there are some quite complex aspects at play, which [have] been captured beautifully in the film." Robert Bell of Exclaim! rated it 6/10 stars and wrote, "While the bigger questions are thought-out and mapped intricately, the superficial conversations between Ana and Freddy lack the nuance necessary to invest us in their plight." Anton Bitel of Little White Lies wrote, "And so After is ultimately a twisted tale of boy meets girl, in a neat merger of boyish comic-book fantasy and girlish fairytale dress-ups that all unfolds in the barren mindscape of a less imaginative adulthood."

James Mudge of Beyond Hollywood wrote that "it's simply too familiar, too limp, and too dull to elicit anything other than vaguely annoyed yawns." Gareth Jones of Dread Central rated it 2/5 stars and wrote, "Far too saccharine for its own good, After is an exercise in boredom that just can’t be saved by the presence of a nifty monster nor an impressively inventive take on the dead/coma premise." James Gracey, on the other hand, thought the familiarity a beneficial launchpad: "While the premise for Ryan Smith's intriguing genre mash-up won't be unfamiliar to most horror/sci-fi audiences, it has enough interesting ideas, conviction, striking visuals, and plot twists to ensure it remains engrossing throughout. ... In a pretty daring move After actually reveals its major twist about half-an-hour in; but it's testament to Smith's script, direction and myriad fascinating ideas, and the chemistry between the two leads, that it remains such a quietly compelling yarn" and "a strangely touching and haunting film."
