= Karolina Wydra =

Polish-American actress and model (born 1981)

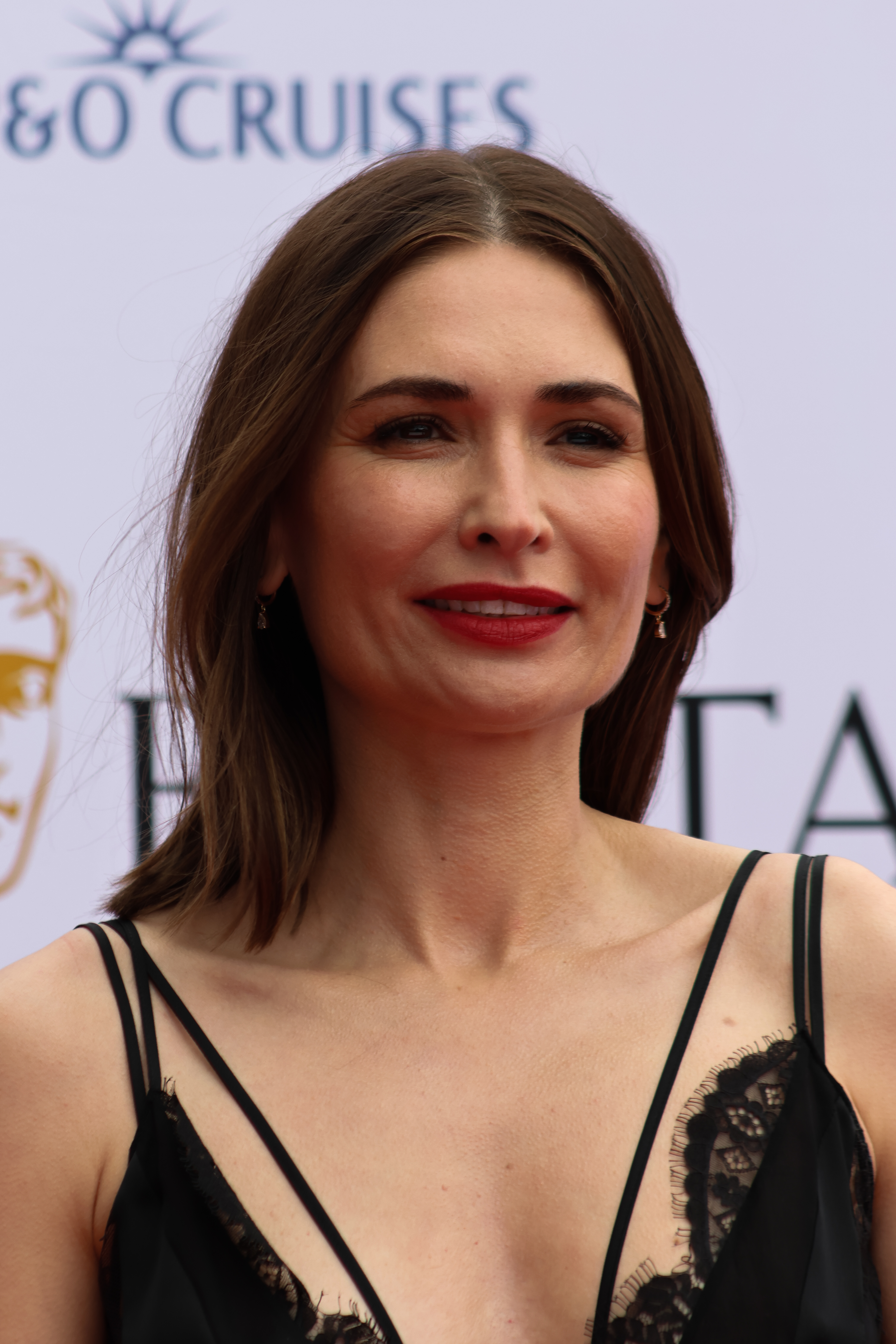
- Wydra in 2026
- Born: Karolina Izabela Wydra; March 5, 1981 (age 45); Opole, Poland
- Occupations: Actress; model
- Years active: 2008–present
- Spouse: Chad Hamilton
- Children: 2

Karolina Wydra (Polish pronunciation: [karɔˈlina vɨdra]; born March 5, 1981) is a Polish-American actress and model. She is best known for her television roles as Dominika Petrova in House (2011–2012), the vampire Violet Mazurski in True Blood (2013–2014), detective Dianne Kubek in Wicked City (2015), the alien Izel in Agents of S.H.I.E.L.D. (2019), and Zosia in Pluribus (2025–present), the latter of which earned her a nomination for the Primetime Emmy Award for Outstanding Supporting Actress in a Drama Series. Her film work includes leading parts in the fantasy horror After (2012) and the sci-fi thriller Europa Report (2013).

== Early life ==
Karolina Izabela Wydra was born on March 5, 1981 in Opole, Poland. Both of her parents were teachers: her mother, Irena, taught mathematics, while her father, Józef, taught art. She has an older brother, Patryk, who became an accountant in London. In 1992, when Wydra was 11, her family emigrated to the United States, settling in Orange County, California, where her parents started a cleaning business. Her parents separated in 2012, after which her mother returned to Poland.

== Career ==
=== Modeling ===
Wydra's career in the public eye began in modeling. In October 1997, she won the Elite Lee Jeans Model Look Contest. She subsequently featured in advertising campaigns for major brands including L'Oréal, Armani Exchange, Levi's Red, Calvin Klein, Smashbox Cosmetics, Dooney & Bourke, Charles David, Urban Decay, John Frieda, and Kenneth Cole. Her modeling work also graced the covers of international editions of magazines such as German Elle and Oyster. She notably appeared in a 2006 Nespresso commercial starring George Clooney.

=== Acting ===
Wydra transitioned to acting with film roles in 2008, appearing in the comedy Be Kind Rewind and the drama Sugar. She later had a supporting part in the romantic comedy Crazy, Stupid, Love (2011).

Her breakthrough role on American television came with the medical drama House, where from 2011 to 2012 she played Dominika Petrova, an immigrant who enters a marriage of convenience with the titular character, Dr. Gregory House. She then landed leading film roles in the thriller After (2012) and the found-footage sci-fi film Europa Report (2013).

From 2013 to 2014, Wydra gained wider recognition playing the fierce vampire Violet Mazurski on the popular HBO series True Blood, initially as a recurring character before being promoted to the main cast for the final season.

Subsequent television roles included recurring parts on Justified (2014), Scorpion (2014), and Quantico (2017). She starred as detective Dianne Kubek in the 2015 ABC crime series Wicked City. She also appeared in high-profile series like Sneaky Pete (2017) and the revival of Twin Peaks (2017). In 2019, she played the powerful alien entity Izel on Agents of S.H.I.E.L.D..

In March 2024, Wydra was cast in the lead role of Zosia in the Apple TV+ science fiction series Pluribus, created by Breaking Bad showrunner Vince Gilligan. She earned the part after the casting team, who remembered her from a 2016 horror film, sought her out for an audition. In 2026, Wydra received a nomination for the Primetime Emmy Award for Outstanding Supporting Actress in a Drama Series.

== Personal life ==
Wydra lives in Los Angeles. She is married to executive producer Chad Hamilton and they have two sons.

== Filmography ==
=== Film ===
Karolina Wydra film credits
Year	Title	Role	Notes
2008	Be Kind Rewind	Gabrielle Bochenski	
2008	Sugar	Raquel	
2009	Boreal	Elizabeth	Short film
2010	Seconds	Ania	Short film
2011	Crazy, Stupid, Love	Jordyn	
2012	After	Ana	
2012	Eugene	Alice	Short film
2013	Europa Report	Katya Petrovna	
2015	Shadows	Luna	Short film
2016	Incarnate	Anna Ember	
2019	A Score to Settle	Simone	

=== Television ===
Karolina Wydra television credits
Year	Title	Role	Notes
2008	Law & Order: Criminal Intent	Christina	Episode: "Ten Count"
2011–2012	House	Dominika Petrova	6 episodes
2012	Bad Girls	Kelly	Unaired pilot
2013–2014	True Blood	Violet Mazurski	15 episodes
2014	Justified	Mara Paxton	5 episodes
2014	Scorpion	Agent Simone Taylor	Episode: "Revenge"
2015	Wicked City	Dianne Kubek	8 episodes
2017	Sneaky Pete	Karolina	8 episodes
2017	Quantico	Sasha Barinov	5 episodes
2017	Twin Peaks	Chloe	Episode: "Part 9"
2017	MacGyver	Vera Kazakova	Episode: "Roulette Wheel + Wire"
2019	Agents of S.H.I.E.L.D.	Izel	7 episodes
2025–present	Pluribus	Zosia	7 episodes

== Theatre credits ==
Karolina Wydra theatrical credits
Year	Title	Role	Venue
2017	French Waitress and Other Plays	Kasia	Electric Lodge, Los Angeles

== Awards and nominations ==
Karolina Wydra awards and nominations
Year	Award	Category	Work	Result	Ref.
2026	Saturn Awards	Best Supporting Actress in a Television Series	Pluribus	Won	
2026	Gotham Awards	Outstanding Supporting Performance in a Drama Series	Pluribus	Nominated	
2026	Newport Beach TV Festival	Breakout Award	Pluribus	Honored	
2026	Dorian Awards	Best Supporting TV Performance – Drama	Pluribus	Nominated	
2026	Gold Derby TV Awards	Drama Supporting Actress	Pluribus	Nominated	
2026	Primetime Emmy Awards	Outstanding Supporting Actress in a Drama Series	Pluribus	Nominated	
