= The Burning Room =

2014 novel by Michael Conelly

- Hardcover edition
- Author: Michael Connelly
- Language: English
- Series: Harry Bosch
- Release number: 17
- Genre: Crime, mystery, thriller
- Publisher: Little, Brown and Company
- Publication date: November 3, 2014
- Publication place: United States
- Media type: Print (hardback & paperback)
- Pages: 400
- ISBN: 978-0-316-22593-9
- OCLC: 871788516
- Dewey Decimal: 813/.54
- LC Class: PS3553.O51165 B87 2014
- Preceded by: The Black Box
- Followed by: The Crossing

The Burning Room is a crime thriller novel, and the twenty-seventh novel by American author Michael Connelly, and the seventeenth novel featuring Los Angeles Police Department detective Harry Bosch.

The book was published on November 3, 2014 by Little, Brown and Company, this novel and The Concrete Blonde formed the basis for the 2021 seventh season of Bosch, starring Titus Welliver as Bosch.

== Plot ==
Harry Bosch serves with the Los Angeles Police Department's Open-Unsolved Unit, where he is paired with Lucia Soto, a young detective preparing for homicide duty. Their assignment concerns Orlando Merced, a mariachi musician shot at Mariachi Plaza, a decade earlier. Merced survived for ten years, paralyzed from the waist down, but complications from his wounds kill him. Doctors remove the bullet, giving Bosch an opportunity to examine evidence that could not be studied before.

The shooting had long been dismissed as random gang violence. Bosch and Soto learn that a hunting rifle was used from a distant location. The shot appears to have been aimed at someone else, and Merced may have been struck by mistake. Their review of old records and witness accounts points to a wealthy businessman and a former Los Angeles mayor who hopes to become governor of California. Bosch must determine how these men relate to the attack without allowing their status to halt his inquiry.

Soto also attracts Bosch's attention for another reason. He notices that she is acting unusually and learns that she has been looking into a fire without permission from her supervisors. When she was a child, a blaze at an apartment building killed nine children; Soto was among the few who survived. The matter was never solved, and a suspect vanished. Soto has carried the memory for years and wants to learn who caused the deaths.

Bosch decides to help her, using a false tie between her search and Merced's case to keep her efforts from drawing notice. The pair examine both matters at once. Their inquiries into the fire bring them to a robbery crew associated with the North Hollywood bank robbers. The federal agents suspect that money from the robberies supported a white supremacist militia. Bosch and Soto follow clues to a woman staying at a convent near the Mexican border, where she has kept away from those who might seek her out.

The woman's account helps show how a robbery led to the deadly fire. The many members of the crew are dead, making it hard to establish every part of what happened. Soto gains a clearer account of her childhood and the loss suffered by the families.

Meanwhile, Bosch and Soto establish that Merced was caught in an assassination attempt aimed at another person. Their findings touch on wealth, ambition, and misconduct among people with access to city affairs. Bosch sees how a crime can remain dangerous long after its victims have been forgotten.

Bosch knows his retirement is near and hopes Soto can take over his duties in Open-Unsolved. He teaches her what years as a detective have taught him, and she earns his trust. Yet Bosch is caught entering Robbery-Homicide Division offices during his search for evidence. The department suspends him indefinitely while it reviews his conduct. With less than a year before retirement, Bosch leaves his unit uncertain whether he will ever return.
