= The Black Box (novel) =

2012 novel by Michael Connelly

- Hardcover edition
- Author: Michael Connelly
- Language: English
- Series: Harry Bosch
- Release number: 15
- Genre: Crime, mystery, thriller
- Publisher: Little, Brown and Company
- Publication date: November 26, 2012
- Publication place: United States
- Media type: Print (hardback & paperback)
- Pages: 560
- ISBN: 978-0-316-06943-4
- OCLC: 776523516
- Dewey Decimal: 813/.54
- LC Class: PS3553.O51165 B53 2012
- Preceded by: The Drop
- Followed by: The Burning Room

The Black Box is a crime thriller novel, and the twenty-fifth novel by American author Michael Connelly, and the sixteenth novel featuring Los Angeles Police Department detective Harry Bosch.

The book was published on November 26, 2012 by Little, Brown and Company, "in part to honor the 20th anniversary of the character".

== Plot ==
In 1992, during the Los Angeles riots, Detective Harry Bosch and his partner, Jerry Edgar, respond to a murder near a looted store. Their victim, Anneke Jespersen, is a Danish photojournalist who traveled to Los Angeles to photograph the unrest. The fires burn across the city, buildings lie damaged, and police officers struggle to respond to widespread violence. Bosch examines Jespersen's body and collects a spent bullet casing. When the cold case passes to the Riot Crimes Task Force, he keeps the evidence. The killing remains unsolved for two decades.

Twenty years later, Bosch, now assigned to the Open-Unsolved Unit, receives a ballistics report connecting the casing from Jespersen's murder to three other killings. He reopens the case, reviews old police records, searches for witnesses, and compares forensic findings. His former colleague Edgar remains part of his professional circle, while FBI agent Rachel Walling becomes relevant to his activities.

Bosch revisits the original crime scene and searches for witnesses who remember Jespersen or the night she died. He speaks with people whose recollections differ and checks their accounts against dates, reports, and physical evidence. Rufus Coleman, Hannah Stone, David Chu, and J.J. Drummond are among the names he examines. The recovered casing offers a scientific starting point for determining whether the separate killings share a common source.

He also investigates Jespersen's work and her contacts in Los Angeles. Her photographs may have captured something beyond the riots themselves. Henrik Jespersen, Jannik Frej, and Mikkel Bonn are among those associated with her life and professional activities. Bosch considers whether her photographs exposed facts that someone wanted concealed. Interviews with Francis Dowler and other witnesses help him assess what the journalist might have seen before her death.

As Bosch presses on, his inquiries attract scrutiny from department supervisors and Internal Affairs. Some officers question the resources devoted to a murder committed twenty years earlier, while renewed attention to police conduct during the riots creates further resistance. Bosch continues reviewing ammunition records and interviewing witnesses. Nancy Mendenhall, Trumont Story, Jordy Gant, and Charles Washburn enter his inquiries as he tests competing accounts against the available proof.

Further interviews bring Gary Harrod, Martin Maycock, Gail Briscoe, and Pete Sargent into his examination of the case. Rick Jackson, Suzanne Wingo, Bill Holodnak, Carl Cosgrove, Reginald Banks, and Charlotte Jackson also belong to the wider circle of people associated with the inquiry.

By combining forensic findings with witness testimony and records from 1992, Bosch establishes how Jespersen's death relates to the other killings. An admission supports the evidence and helps him identify the person responsible. Despite resistance from within the police department, he pursues the case to its conclusion. The bullet casing he saved during the riots ultimately supplies the proof needed to bring justice to Anneke Jespersen, whose death might otherwise have remained forgotten.

== Reception ==
The book placed at #2 on the Chronicle bestseller list for San Francisco Bay Area booksellers, in December 2012.

In 2012, The Black Box won the world's most lucrative crime fiction award, the RBA Prize for Crime Writing worth €125,000.
