= Ryan R. Johnson =

American independent film producer

- Education: Whittier College
- Occupation: Film producer
- Years active: 1997–present
- Known for: Executive at Sprockefeller Pictures and Night Fox Entertainment

Ryan R. Johnson is an American independent film producer who is the current president of production and a principal at Sprockefeller Pictures. He has also founded or been an executive at various other production and distribution companies including Pretty Dangerous Films, The Film House, Night Fox Entertainment and Mandalay Pictures. Over the course of his career, he has produced, executive produced or developed dozens of films, including Enemy at the Gates, Chasing 3000, Arkansas, and numerous others.

== Life and career ==
Ryan R. Johnson grew up in Boise, Idaho. He attended Whittier College in California, graduating in 1996. He started his career in the entertainment industry in the 1990s as the stunt double for the Green Ranger on the Mighty Morphin Power Rangers TV series. In 1997, he earned a job at Mandalay Pictures, where he eventually worked his way up to an executive position. While there, he worked as a development associate on films like Sleepy Hollow and Enemy at the Gates. In 2003, he formed his own production company, Pretty Dangerous Films, where he served as president and CEO. As head of that company, he produced a number of films, including Chasing 3000, The Heart Is Deceitful Above All Things, and Edmond. He also produced and wrote the screenplay for the 2005 film, The Curse of El Charro.

In 2015, he partnered with Martin Sprock to create Sprockefeller Pictures, another production company. In 2013, he founded The Film House, a film distributor and production company based in upstate New York. Johnson served as president and CEO of that company. Also in 2013, he was named the president of production at Night Fox Entertainment. Through these production entities, he has served as producer on many films, including Z for Zachariah (2015), 9/11 (2017), Hooking Up (2020), and numerous others.

== Filmography ==
=== Film ===
Year	Title	Role	Notes
1995	Raging Angels	Stunt double	
1996	The Fan	Intern	
1997	Double Team	Assistant to head of production	
1997	Donnie Brasco	Production assistant	Uncredited
1997	Seven Years in Tibet	Assistant to head of production	Uncredited
1997	I Know What You Did Last Summer	Assistant to head of production	Uncredited
1997	Madam Savant	Actor (Business Man)	
1998	Desperate Measures	Assistant to head of production	Uncredited
1998	Wild Things	Assistant to head of production	Uncredited
1998	Les Misérables	Assistant to head of production	Uncredited
1998	Dance with Me	Assistant to head of production	
1998	I Still Know What You Did Last Summer	Assistant in charge of production	Uncredited
1999	Gloria	Assistant to head of production	Uncredited
1999	The Deep End of the Ocean	Assistant to head of production	Uncredited
1999	Sleepy Hollow	Development associate	Uncredited
2000	Yup Yup Man	Executive producer	
2001	Enemy at the Gates	Development associate	Uncredited
2001	The Score	Development executive	Uncredited
2002	Nantucket	Producer	
2002	King's Highway	Line producer/producer	
2002	Serving Sara	Development associate	
2003	The Beat	Co-producer	
2003	Where the Red Fern Grows	Consulting producer	Direct-to-video film
2003	Beyond Borders	Development associate	
2003	The Falls	Executive producer	
2004	The Heart Is Deceitful Above All Things	Executive producer	
2004	The Drone Virus	Producer, stunt double	
2005	Dark Justice	Executive producer	
2005	The Jacket	Development associate	
2005	The Curse of El Charro	Producer, writer	Direct-to-video film
2005	The Nickel Children	Producer, actor (The Security Guard)	
2005	Back in the Day	Co-producer	
2005	Into the Blue	Development executive	
2005	Edmond	Executive producer	
2005	Inheritance	Executive producer	
2005	The Most Beautiful of My Very Best Years	Executive producer	
2005	Forgotten China	Executive producer	Documentary
2006	Seven Mummies	Producer	
2006	Splinter	Co-producer	
2007	Cosmic Radio	Producer, actor (CIA Agent #2)	
2007	Chasing 3000	Producer, actor (ER doctor)	
2009	H2O Extreme	Producer	
2010	Costa Rican Summer	Producer, actor (Fisherman)	
2011	Cellmates	Producer	
2011	Monsterpiece Theatre Volume 1	Supervising producer	
2012	Yoga Is: A Transformational Journey	Executive producer	Documentary
2012	Visible Scars	Executive producer	
2015	Z for Zachariah	Executive producer	
2016	In Dubious Battle	Co-executive producer	
2017	9/11	Executive producer, actor (Stairwell fireman #3)	
2018	American Dresser	Producer	
2018	Under the Silver Lake	Co-producer	
2018	Lez Bomb	Producer	
2018	Pretenders	Executive producer	
2019	Disappearance	Executive producer	
2019	Against the Clock	Executive producer	
2019	The Divorce Party	Producer	
2019	Life Like	Producer	VOD film
2019	Killerman	Executive producer	
2019	Drama Drama	Executive producer	
2019	Line of Duty	Executive producer	
2020	Spy Intervention	Producer	
2020	Hooking Up	Executive producer	VOD film
2020	Arkansas	Executive producer	VOD film
2020	The Swing of Things	Producer	
2020	Fatman	Executive producer	Upcoming
2020	The Comeback Trail	Executive producer	Upcoming
2021	The Coven	Producer	Post-production
TBA	The Last Victim	Executive producer	Post-production
TBA	Creation Stories	Executive producer	Post-production
TBA	Bonded	Co-producer	Post-production
TBA	12 Mighty Orphans	Executive producer	Post-production
TBA	Oceanside Place	Co-producer	Pre-production
TBA	Honorable Men	Producer	Pre-production
TBA	Brewer's Boys	Producer	Announced
TBA	The Sons of Summer	Producer	Announced
TBA	Bachelorette Weekend	Executive producer	Announced

=== Television ===
Year	Title	Role	Notes
1993–94	Mighty Morphin Power Rangers	Stunt double for Green Ranger (Tommy)	12 episodes; Fox Kids TV series
2007	Sons of Hollywood	Self	Episode 1.5: "Making of a Male Actor"
2008	The Write Environment	Executive producer	KCET documentary series
2011	Blondie's	Executive producer	Reality TV pilot
2014	The Chase Backer Show	Producer	Web-based talk show
