= Life Like (film) =

2019 science-fiction drama film

- Film poster
- Directed by: Josh Janowicz
- Written by: Josh Janowicz
- Produced by: Ryan R. Johnson
- Starring: Steven Strait; Addison Timlin; James D'Arcy; Drew Van Acker
- Cinematography: Benjamin A. Goodman
- Edited by: James Lesage
- Music by: Katy Jarzebowski
- Production company: Lionsgate
- Release date: May 14, 2019
- Running time: 95 minutes
- Country: United States
- Language: English

Life Like is a 2019 science-fiction drama film written and directed by Josh Janowicz in his feature debut, and distributed by Grindstone Entertainment Group. Its story follows a young couple who purchases a life-like robot named Henry, to care for their newly inherited home, who begins to develop human emotions. The film stars Steven Strait, Addison Timlin, James D'Arcy, and Drew Van Acker.

The film was produced by Lionsgate Films and was released on May 14, 2019.

== Plot ==
James is working at a trust fund run by his father. Upon the death of his father, he becomes CEO of the company. James and his wife Sophie move away from the city into a suburban mansion. Sophie doesn't work and spends most of the time at home. Feeling uncomfortable with James having a butler, maid and a cook, she fires them.

James and Sophie meet Julian, a man who sells artificially intelligent robots to be used as domestic servants. The couple choose a male android named Henry, who dutifully carries out their commands around the house. However, encouraged by Sophie, who reads to him, Henry begins to develop emotions and have dreams.

Several undercurrents begin to take hold. One evening, Sophie discovers Henry walking outside the house stark naked and somewhat disoriented. A naked encounter between James and Henry in the bathroom, who is bringing in a handful of fresh towels, leads to an awkward exchange and then Henry shaves James. Sophie and James discuss "getting out of the bubble". Sophie dreams of Henry kissing her while receiving a massage, and then later masturbates. Sophie asks Henry if he was watching her and Henry asks "would it please you if I was?" Sophie is disturbed when Henry mouths "I love you" in the same manner as James. James suggests to Julian that Henry is falling for his wife, to which he replies, "that is not possible". James confronts Henry, asking if he's attracted to his wife and becomes enraged when Henry says perhaps his wife believes her love is fading. Sophie confronts James after telling Henry to stop reading with her, and she begins to pack a bag to go stay in the city for a few days. During another racquet ball game Henry is being difficult with James. James is in the shower naked, Henry comes in also naked and begins talking poetry before saying "I've never loved for I have no heart" then requests to shave him. Henry covers his face with shaving cream and then starts to shave but James stops him and then Henry begins to kiss James before performing fellatio on him. The next morning James is confused about what happened. At the office James discusses a business deal with co-workers and talks to Sophie about making some changes in life before going to a meeting.

Sophie receives a massage from Henry who begins to kiss her but stops her after a few minutes. Henry declares that he wishes to please Sophie, she begins to panic and orders him to his Docking station, to which he complies. Sophie tells James what happened and James blames Sophie for it and scolds her. He then confronts Henry and punches him, hurting his hand and tells Henry to go into his Docking station, then disconnects his charging station. Henry asks Sophie what's wrong with him and she says it is because he kissed her. Henry then says "lust not love". Julian shows up at their house and she demands to have Henry shut down, to which he complies. Julian asks Henry to go into his docking station but he refuses saying he knows about his lies. Sophie and James talk in his office about the truth of what's happened since Henry's arrival. They apologize to one another.

They head outside after seeing Henry standing naked outside in a field, and Sophie grabs a knife just in case. Henry begins to question if Julian is his maker or not, asking if he can power down to which they agree.

Julian is discovered to be a fraud. All of his machines are revealed to be real humans he had raised; Julian had taken custody of Henry when Henry was a small child rejected by his mother and suffered serious physical abuse. He had raised all of them to believe they were androids. Two FBI agents go to James and Sophie's residence to arrest Julian, but Julian shoots them with a shotgun. Julian then turns his weapon on James and Sophie, but Henry attacks Julian, beating him mercilessly with the shotgun. Feeling betrayed by his maker and ashamed that he has betrayed his keepers, Henry commits seppuku with a large knife. James and Sophie cry and console Henry as he dies.

Five years later, James and Sophie are shown with a young son named Henry whom they plan to someday tell about his namesake.

== Cast ==
- Addison Timlin as Sophie
- Drew Van Acker as James
- Steven Strait as Henry
- James D'Arcy as Julian

== Production ==
Though director Josh Janowicz has directed many commercials and several short films, Life Like is his first feature-length film.

== Home media ==
The film was released on Blu-ray and DVD disc formats, as well as through digital and on-demand channels, by Lionsgate Home Entertainment on May 14, 2019, earning $74,853.
