= Madison Lintz =

American actress (born 1999)

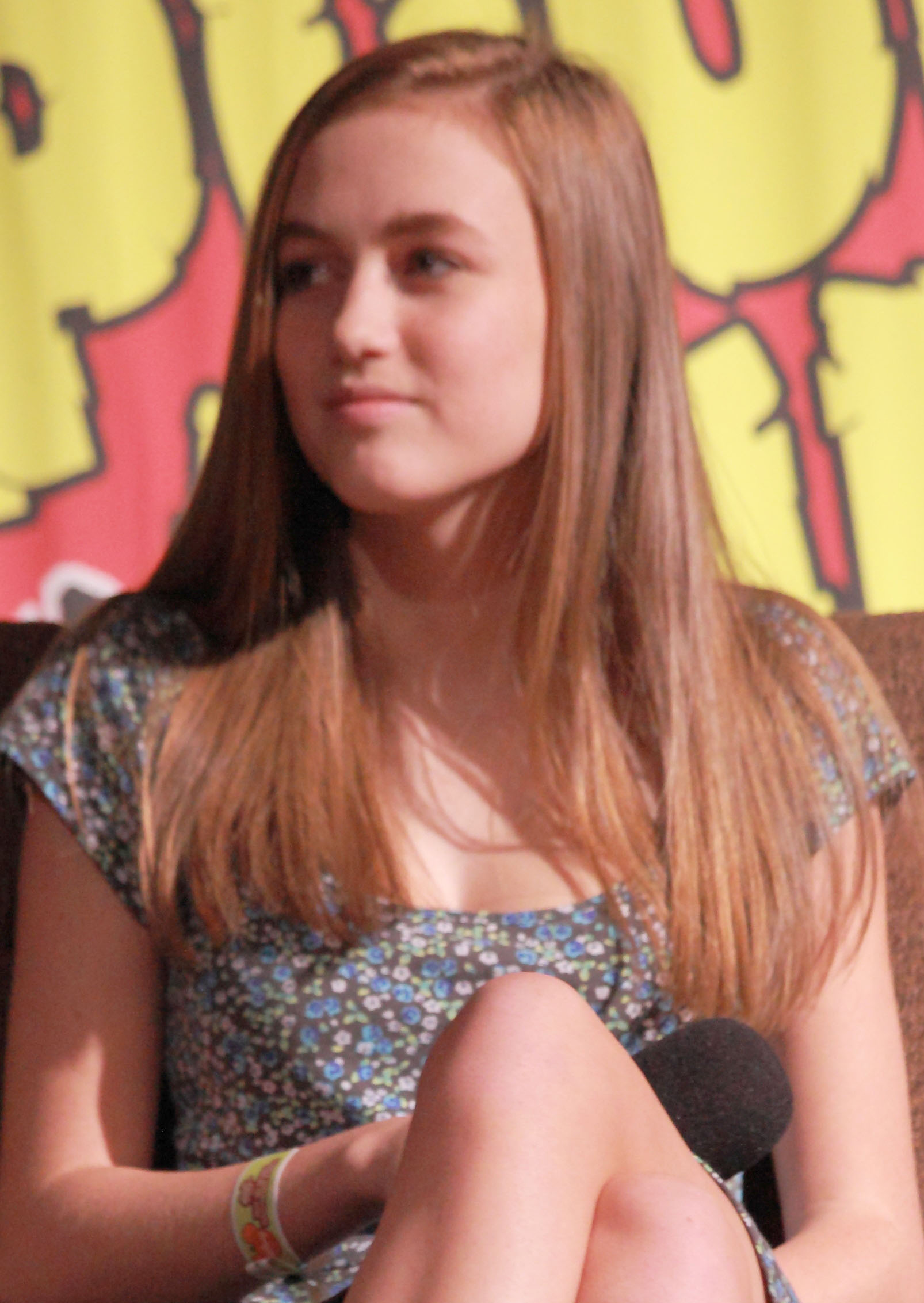
- Lintz at Spooky Empire's Ultimate Horror Weekend in 2014
- Born: May 11, 1999 (age 27); Atlanta, Georgia, U.S.
- Occupation: Actress
- Years active: 2005–present
- Known for: The Walking Dead, Parental Guidance, Bosch, Bosch: Legacy
- Parents: Kelly Collins Lintz; Marc Lintz
- Relatives: Mackenzie Lintz (sister); Matt Lintz (brother); Macsen Lintz (brother)

Madison Lintz (born May 11, 1999) is an American actress known for her roles as Sophia Peletier in the AMC post-apocalyptic television drama series The Walking Dead (2010–2012) and as Madeline "Maddie" Bosch in the streaming series Bosch (2015–2021) and its revival Bosch: Legacy (2022–2025).

== Career ==
Lintz's acting career began when she was six years old, appearing in commercials as well as voice-overs.

She appeared in the first two seasons of AMC's post-apocalyptic television series The Walking Dead, playing Carol Peletier's 12-year-old daughter Sophia. She has appeared in the television series Nashville and It's Supernatural. She played the supporting role of Maddie Bosch in the Amazon series Bosch from 2015 until the series ended in 2021, portraying the daughter of the titular character, Harry Bosch. Lintz reprised her role in the spinoff series, Bosch: Legacy, which premiered on Amazon Freevee on May 6, 2022.

She appeared in the independent film titled Newbourne County (2011) and two 2012 films, Parental Guidance and After.

In July 2025, it was announced that she will star in and executive produce "Eve Ronin," a TV series based on Lee Goldberg's bestselling series of novels.

== Personal life ==
Lintz was born on May 11, 1999, to Kelly Collins Lintz, an actress who played "white bread mom" in We're the Millers, and Marc Lintz, a real estate agent. Lintz's three siblings are Mackenzie, Matt, and Macsen. Her brothers have both appeared on The Walking Dead as Carol's adopted son Henry; Macsen played the young version of Henry from 2016 to 2018, and Matt played the older version of Henry from 2018 to 2019. In 2012, Lintz was living with her family in Alpharetta, Georgia, and was being home-schooled. She later attended Covenant Christian Academy. Madison married actor Jackie Kay in May 2026.

== Filmography ==
Film roles
Year	Title	Role	Notes
2012	After	Young Ana	
2012	Parental Guidance	Ashley	
2018	Along Came the Devil	Hannah	
2025	Self-Help	Sophie	

Television roles
Year	Title	Role	Notes
2010–2012	The Walking Dead	Sophia Peletier	Recurring Role; 8 episodes
2011	It's Supernatural	Natalia	
2012	Nashville	Dana Butler	
2012	American Judy	Annie	Television movie
2015–2021	Bosch	Maddie Bosch	Main role; 64 episodes
2022–2025	Bosch: Legacy	Maddie Bosch	Main role; 30 episodes
2026	Tracker	Brit	Guest role; 1 episode

Video games
Year	Title	Voice role	Notes
2023	The Walking Dead: Destinies	Sophia Peletier / Female Woodbury Goon #1	

== Awards and nominations ==
Year	Award	Category	Work	Result	Ref.
2013	Young Artist Awards	Best Performance in a TV Series – Supporting Young Actress	The Walking Dead	Nominated	
2016	Young Artist Awards	Best Performance in a TV Series – Recurring Young Actress (14–21)	Bosch	Nominated	
2021	Saturn Awards	Best Performance by a Younger Actor on a Television Series	Bosch	Nominated	
