= Village Community School =

Coordinates: 40°43′59.83″N 74°0′29.03″W

Village Community School (VCS)

Location
- 272-278 West 10th St. West Village; New York City, New York County, NY 10014; USA

Information
- Former name: Public School 107
- School type: Independent
- Founded: 1970
- Founder: Sheila Sadler
- Status: Open
- Head of school: Jennifer Mitchell
- Grades: K-8
- Primary years taught: Kindergarten through 5th Grades
- Secondary years taught: 6th through 8th grades
- Gender: Coeducational
- Age range: 4-14
- Enrollment: 328
- Schedule: Day
- Hours in school day: 8
- Area: 86,440 square feet
- Campus type: Urban
- Colors: Blue and white
- Slogan: The New York Leader In K-8 Education
- Athletics conference: Downtown Independent School Community (DISC)
- Sports: Basketball, Soccer, Volleyball, Track
- Mascot: Blue Jays
- Nickname: VCS
- Rival: St. Lukes School
- Website: www.vcsnyc.org

Village Community School (also known as VCS) is an independent co-educational day school for grades PreK-8 located in Greenwich Village of New York City, USA. VCS is a member of the Downtown Independent School Community (DISC) and the New York State Association of Independent Schools NYSAIS.

22% of its families receive tuition assistance; and 39% of the school's families are racially diverse. VCS was mentioned by The New York City Private Schools Blog for its primary experiences, attention to artistry and craftsmanship and commitment to diversity.

== History ==
In early 1970, Bank Street School for Children, a private school then located in Greenwich Village decided to move its location uptown. VCS opened its doors to replace the niche left open by the loss of Bank Street and in September 1970 began the education of 170 children in grades K-6. By 1973, VCS was a fully operational K-8 school.

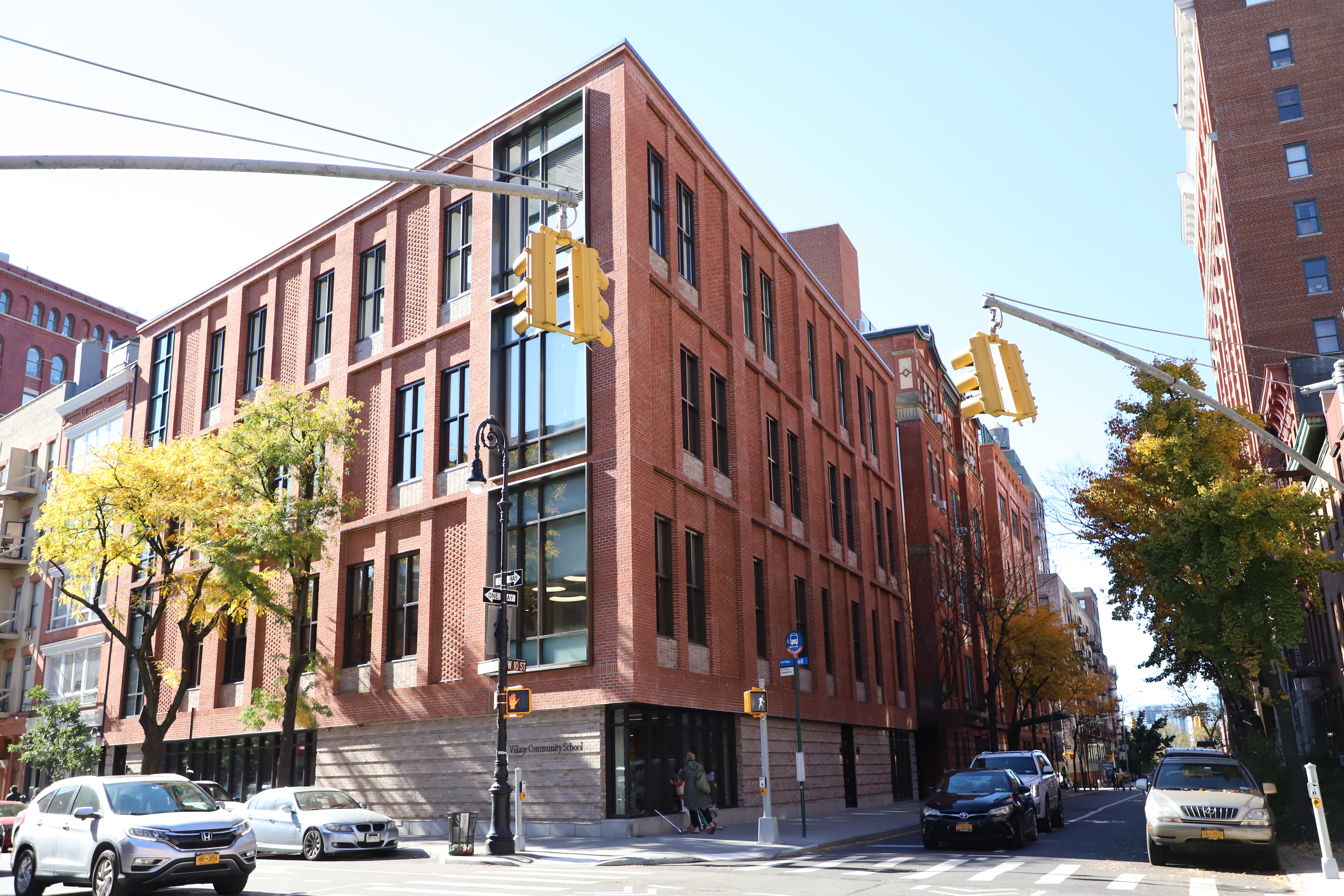
VCS's 86,440-square-foot campus in Greenwich Village

The main building of VCS is at 272 West 10th St. The school building was originally completed in 1886 as Primary School No. 7. It was re-designated as Public School 107 in 1897. This school closed in 1930 and reopened as the parochial school of St. Veronica's Church in 1932. The school building remained vacant from 1963 until June 1970.

In 2003, VCS expanded its original five-story building by the addition of a second five-story building, designed by architect Leo Blackman, adjacent to the first, containing additional classrooms, a fully functional gymnasium and auditorium. In 2021, VCS had 350 students.

In late 2018, VCS announced that the school was planning to build a three-story addition, plus rooftop play yard on the site of its current yard. The 17,000-square-foot addition was designed by Jonathan Marvel, Lissa So, Caroline Frantz, Henry Newman, Patrick Hamon, and Cat Travers of Marvel Designs. The Eve K. Kleger Wing opened in 2021, containing a new sky yard, gym, library, wood shop, tech lab, science room, language lab, and additional classrooms.

In October 2019, the VCS announced the untimely passing of its long-term and much-loved Head of School, Eve K. Kleger. Effective July 1, 2020, Jennifer Mitchell became VCS's fifth Head of School.

== Notable alumni ==
- Vin Diesel, actor
- Steven Strait, actor
- King Princess, musician
- Grace Van Patten, actor
- Max Graham, music producer, DJ

== Trivia ==
The video of UTFO’s 1984 song “Beats and Rhymes” was shot entirely on the school grounds and featured then-current students and faculty.
