= Steven Strait =

American actor and singer (born 1986)

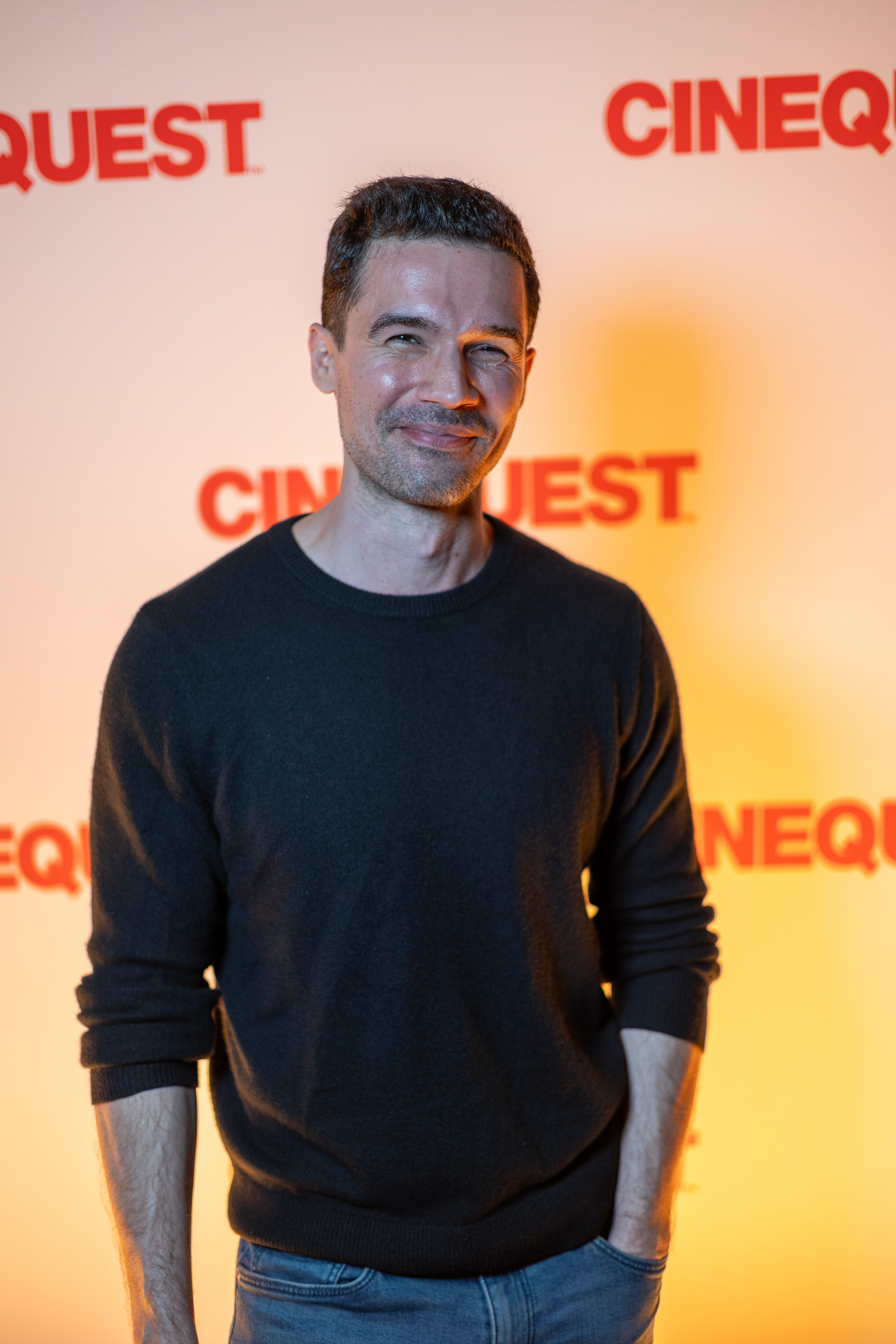
- Strait at the Cinequest Film Festival in 2026
- Born: March 23, 1986 (age 40); New York City, U.S.
- Occupations: Actor, singer
- Years active: 2001–present
- Spouses: Lynn Collins (m. 2007; div. 2013) Daria Zhemkova (m. 2019)

Steven Strait (born March 23, 1986) is an American actor and singer. He is best known for starring as Warren Peace in the adventure film Sky High (2005), as Caleb Danvers in The Covenant (2006), and as James Holden in the science fiction series The Expanse (2015–2022).

== Early life ==
Strait was born and raised in Greenwich Village, a neighborhood of Manhattan, New York, the son of Jean (née Viscione) and Richard Dyer Strait. His ancestry is Dutch and Italian. He attended Village Community School, Xavier High School and took classes at the Stella Adler Studio of Acting.

== Career ==
During his teen years, Strait modeled for several magazines, including L'uomo Vogue, Spoon, Details, Surface, Hollister Co., and Pop, and worked with photographers Bruce Weber, Herb Ritts, and Ellen von Unwerth.

Strait began taking acting lessons at the age of eleven. In the sixth grade, he began to take performing classes at the Village Community School. Although forced into it at first, he found a passion for acting after he performed live for the first time. He has worked at both the Stella Adler Acting Studio and the Black Nexxus Acting Studio in New York City.

In 2004, he moved to California to pursue a career in acting. After his first audition, he received an acting job, and in 2005, he appeared in his first film, Sky High, where he played a teenage superhero named Warren Peace. He covered The Fixx's song "One Thing Leads to Another" for the film's soundtrack.

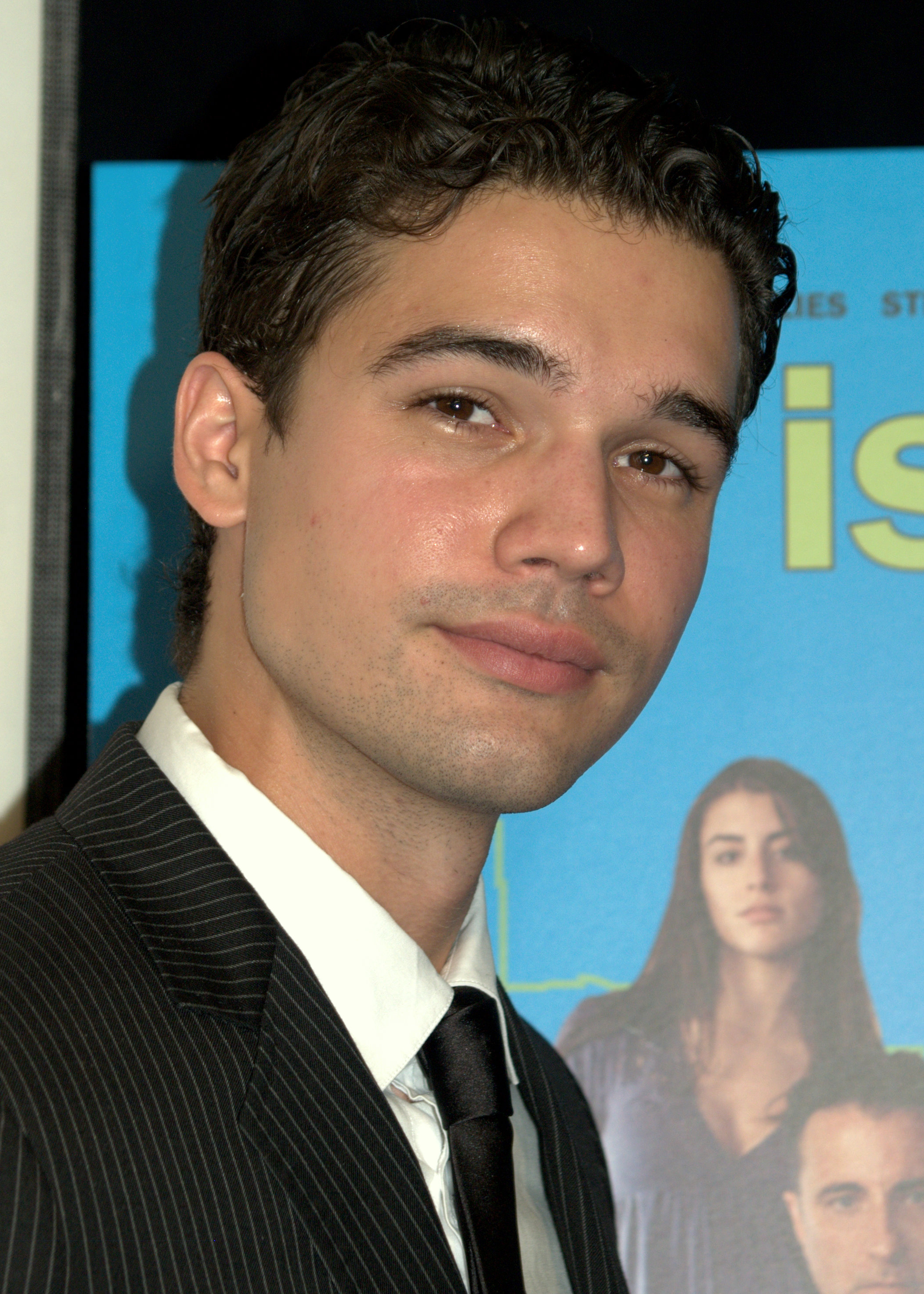
Strait at the 2009 Tribeca Film Festival premiere of City Island

His next film starring role was in Undiscovered, about young singers and actors in the entertainment industry who want to become stars. He also contributed seven songs to the Undiscovered soundtrack. In 2006, he starred as Caleb Danvers in the supernatural thriller film The Covenant. Strait appeared opposite Camilla Belle in 10,000 BC, a film about prehistoric Earth, released in March 2008. He played a young mammoth hunter, D'Leh, as he travels through unknown lands on a quest to rescue his people from slavery.

Strait appeared in the 2008 film Stop-Loss as Michael Colson. In 2009, he played Tony, the son of Andy Garcia's character, in the film City Island.

In November 2010, he guest starred on the NBC series Chase as Jackson Cooper, a fugitive with a dark past who manipulates his teenage girlfriend with promises of freedom from her father and a life filled with romance and adventure.

From 2012 to 2013, Strait co-starred on the Starz series Magic City, which centered on Miami mobsters and other characters from Miami Beach in the late 1950s. Strait played the son of Jeffrey Dean Morgan's character, Ike Evans.

In 2012, Strait played Freddy in the sci-fi thriller After. The story centered on two bus crash survivors who wake to discover that they are the only people left in their small town.

In 2014, Strait was cast in the lead role of James "Jim" Holden in the science fiction series The Expanse, which aired from 2015 to 2022 on SyFy (seasons 1–3) and Amazon Prime Video (seasons 4–6).

== Personal life ==
Strait was married to actress Lynn Collins on December 23, 2007, after dating for four years. The couple divorced in 2013. In 2019, he married model Daria Zhemkova. They mostly keep their personal life private.

== Filmography ==
=== Film ===
Year	Title	Role	Notes
2005	Sky High	Warren Peace	
2005	Undiscovered	Luke Falcon	
2006	The Covenant	Caleb Danvers	
2008	10,000 BC	D'Leh	
2008	Stop-Loss	Michael Colson	
2009	City Island	Tony Nardella	
2012	After	Freddy	
2013	Sleeping with the Fishes	Dominic Sebastiani	
2016	Hot	Jones	
2019	Life Like	Henry	
2019	Here Awhile	Michael	
TBA	Body Language	Dylan	Post-production
2026	Serena	Chris Sadowski	

=== Television ===
Year	Title	Role	Notes
2001	Third Watch	Teenage Bobby	Episode: "Requiem for a Bantamweight"
2010	HMS: White Coat	Jonathan David	Unsold CW pilot
2010	Chase	Jackson Cooper	Episode: "Crazy Love"
2012–2013	Magic City	Steven "Stevie" Evans	Main role
2014	Revenge	Brooks	Episodes: "Struggle", "Disgrace"
2015–2022	The Expanse	James Holden	Main role; also producer
2024	Life in Zero G with Steven Strait	as himself	Web series
2024–present	Chicago Fire	Flynn Calhoun	7 episodes
