= Williamson Herald =

Online news outlet in Franklin, Tennessee, United States

- The Voice of America's Greatest County
- Type: Digital newspaper
- Owner(s): CMD Publishing
- Founded: 2005
- Headquarters: 1117 Columbia Ave, Franklin, TN 37064
- Website: williamsonherald.com

Williamson Herald is an online news outlet based in Franklin, Tennessee. The newspaper provides coverage to Williamson County, Tennessee, including the cities of Franklin, Brentwood, Spring Hill, Nolensville, and Fairview, and also publishes print versions. It was founded in 2005 and is owned by CMD Publishing.
