= The Wrong Side of Goodbye =

2016 novel by Michael Connelly

- Cover of the 2016 Little, Brown edition
- Author: Michael Connelly
- Language: English
- Series: Harry Bosch
- Release number: 19
- Genre: Crime, mystery, thriller
- Publisher: Little, Brown and Company
- Publication date: November 1, 2016
- Publication place: United States
- Media type: Print (hardback & paperback)
- Pages: 392
- ISBN: 978-0-316-22594-6
- OCLC: 940361429
- Dewey Decimal: 813/.54
- LC Class: PS3553.O51165 W76 2016
- Preceded by: The Crossing
- Followed by: Two Kinds of Truth

The Wrong Side of Goodbye is a crime thriller novel, and the twenty-ninth novel by American author Michael Connelly, and the nineteenth novel featuring Los Angeles Police Department detective Harry Bosch.

The book was published on November 1, 2016 by Little, Brown and Company.

== Plot ==
During the Vietnam War, five soldiers board a transport helicopter under fire, but snipers kill the pilot and mortally wound the copilot. As the aircraft descends toward a rice paddy, one soldier whispers "Vibiana." The helicopter crashes and explodes.

In present-day Los Angeles, retired LAPD detective Harry Bosch visits Trident Security. John Creighton, a former LAPD deputy chief, gives him a $10,000 retainer from Whitney Vance, an 85-year-old billionaire. Vance explains that in 1950, while attending USC, he had a romance with Vibiana Duarte, a 16-year-old cafeteria worker who became pregnant. His father intervened, and Vibiana disappeared. Nearing death, Vance wants Bosch to determine whether she bore his child and whether any descendants survive.

Bosch, now a reserve detective with the San Fernando Police Department, searches records. He learns that Vibiana died by suicide in 1951 at St. Helen's Home for Unwed Mothers after giving birth to a son who was adopted. A former employee recalls that the baby was named Dominick. Bosch identifies him as Dominick Santanello, raised by an adoptive family in Oxnard.

Santanello became a Navy corpsman and died in Vietnam in 1970. Bosch examines his belongings and finds photographs indicating that Santanello fathered a child before his death. Bosch locates Gabriela Lida, who confirms that she and Dominick had a daughter, Vibiana Veracruz, named after her grandmother. Vibiana lives in Los Angeles with her young son, giving Vance a living descendant.

Meanwhile, Bosch investigates the Screen Cutter, a serial rapist targeting Latina women. After a fifth attack goes wrong, evidence points toward the offender. When Bella Lourdes, Bosch's colleague, disappears, he identifies Kurt Dockweiler, a former police detective employed in a city code enforcement. Dockweiler used home inspections to select victims. Bosch confronts him, shoots him during a standoff, and rescues Lourdes from a concealed bunker beneath his garage.

After Vance dies, Bosch receives a handwritten will naming him executor and leaving the estate to "the heir of my body." With assistance from his half-brother, defense attorney Mickey Haller, Bosch keeps the document confidential until the heir's identity can be established. When Vibiana agrees to DNA testing, Bosch and Haller use decoy samples to protect her identity. Their caution proves justified when a laboratory is destroyed by arson.

Bosch learns that Vance was murdered. His longtime secretary, Ida Townes Forsythe, had forged portions of the will for financial gain. When Vance recovered from an illness and threatened to expose her fraud, she smothered him. DNA testing confirms Vibiana as Vance's granddaughter and heir. Bosch also learns that Sloan, Vance's former security chief, had been protecting her. Lourdes recovers, and Bosch accepts a full-time position with the San Fernando Police Department.

In the epilogue, an Arts District park funded by Vance's estate opens, the centrepiece is Vibiana's sculpture, a crashed Vietnam helicopter beside a woman holding a faceless baby. Watching the ceremony, Bosch recognizes Vance's distinctive smile in Vibiana.

== Reception ==
Maureen Corrigan of The Washington Post wrote: "This latest Bosch outing is its own accomplishment: brooding and intricate, suspenseful and sad. In short, it's another terrific Michael Connelly mystery."

Paula L. Woods of the Los Angeles Times wrote that while the novel "may not stand shoulder-to-shoulder with some of the stronger entries in the Bosch oeuvre — or boast the high-octane, blood-spattered crimes", it is "immensely satisfying to see Bosch's sustained and deepened passion for his mission— “Everybody counts or nobody counts” — undiminished by age or circumstance, even as a younger generation of detectives of all colors and orientations share the stage to carry on the work that has given Bosch, and this series, such an enduring appeal."
