= The Crossing (Connelly novel) =

2015 novel by Michael Connelly

- Hardcover edition
- Author: Michael Connelly
- Language: English
- Series: Harry Bosch
- Release number: 18
- Genre: Crime, mystery, thriller
- Publisher: Little, Brown and Company
- Publication date: November 3, 2015
- Publication place: United States
- Media type: Print (hardback & paperback)
- Pages: 388
- ISBN: 978-0-316-22588-5
- OCLC: 914296403
- Dewey Decimal: 813/.54
- LC Class: PS3553.O51165 C76 2016
- Preceded by: The Burning Room
- Followed by: The Wrong Side of Goodbye

The Crossing is a crime thriller novel, and the twenty-eighth novel by American author Michael Connelly, and the eighteenth novel featuring Los Angeles Police Department detective Harry Bosch.

The book was published on November 3, 2015 by Little, Brown and Company.

== Plot ==
On April Fools' Day, two unidentified men deliberately drive a burnt-orange Camaro into a motorcyclist on Ventura Boulevard, forcing him into oncoming traffic and killing him. Harry Bosch, a retired LAPD homicide detective, meets his half-brother Mickey Haller, who asks him to review Da'Quan Foster's case. Foster, a former gang member turned painter, stands accused of raping and murdering West Hollywood assistant city manager Lexi Parks. The DNA evidence appears overwhelming, and Bosch refuses Haller's request. Defending an accused criminal contradicts the principles Bosch followed throughout his career.

Bosch reconsiders after examining the evidence. Parks was beaten to death at home, and Foster was arrested after his DNA matched semen recovered at the crime scene. However, investigators found no known association between Foster and Parks, no apparent motive, and no proof they had ever met. Bosch also notices a missing watch overlooked by detectives. Bosch visits Foster at jail and comes to believe him innocent. Foster says he spent the night of Parks's murder at a Hollywood motel with Sindy, a transgender sex worker whose real name was James Allen. He concealed their encounter to protect his marriage and reputation. Haller tells Bosch that Allen was murdered shortly after Foster's arrest, leaving nobody able to verify Foster's alibi.

Bosch examines Allen's death with former LAPD partner Lucia Soto. Their findings point toward two killers. Bosch also learns that Allen may have served as a confidential informant for law enforcement. Motel security footage places Foster's van there during Parks's murder, supporting his account. An independent DNA test confirms that the biological material belonged to Foster but indicates that it had been collected inside a condom and planted at Parks's home.

The missing watch points Bosch toward an expensive Audemars Piguet timepiece associated with Dr. Schubert, a Beverly Hills plastic surgeon. Parks had asked questions about it shortly before her death. When Bosch visits a jewelry store, both owners are murdered before they can answer his questions. Bosch also finds a GPS tracker beneath his vehicle.

Soto identifies Hollywood vice officers Don Ellis and Kevin Long through Allen's records. Bosch ties them to an attack on Haller's investigator and the Camaro from the opening incident. The security footage places the vehicle at the motel on the night Allen died. Schubert admits Ellis and Long secretly recorded a compromising encounter and blackmailed him. Unable to pay, Schubert surrendered valuable jewelry, including Parks's watch. When Parks's questions threatened to expose their scheme, the officers murdered her and framed Foster using DNA obtained from Allen. They subsequently killed Allen to eliminate Foster's alibi.

Using the tracker, Ellis and Long locate Bosch at Schubert's office. Schubert dies during their confrontation. Bosch wounds Long and sends Haller a recorded confession before surrendering to deputies. Long is arrested, but authorities refuse to dismiss Foster's charges. Ellis attempts to kill Bosch at home before fleeing abroad. LAPD Internal Affairs detective Nancy Mendenhall intervenes and shoots Ellis.

At an emergency hearing, Haller presents Bosch's evidence, the confession, and DNA findings proving Foster was framed. The judge dismisses all charges and orders Foster released. Outside the courthouse, Bosch reflects with his daughter Maddie. Freeing an innocent man gives him an unfamiliar sense of satisfaction: seeing an unjust murder prosecution fail.
