= Kimber =

Kimber is a name.the name Kimberly (also spelled Kimberley) means "from the meadow of the royal fortress" or "Cyneburg's field"

== People ==
- Kimber (name)

Includes a list of people with this name

- Kimber may also refer to the Germanic tribe of the Cimbri and related to the German Zimber.

== Companies ==
- Project Kimber
- Kimber Manufacturing, a firearms company that produces a wide variety of weapons, notably their M1911 pistols:
  - Kimber Aegis
  - Kimber Custom
  - Kimber Eclipse
