= Kimber Micro 9 =

American pocket pistol

Kimber Micro
- Type: Semi-automatic pistol
- Place of origin: United States

Production history
- Designer: Kimber Manufacturing

The Kimber Micro 9 is a lightweight, single-action pocket pistol chambered for the 9×19mm Parabellum cartridge, produced by Kimber Manufacturing.

== Brief history ==
This firearm model was first announced in 2015.

In 2016, Kimber introduced the Kimber Micro 9. This included removable grips and mainspring housing, a rounded trigger guard, drift-able fixed sights, a solid aluminum trigger, and a full length metal guide rod.

== Specifications ==
- Chambering: 9mm
- Weight: 15.6 ounces
- Trigger Pull: 7.0 pounds
- Barrel Length: 3.15 inches
- Overall Height: 4.1 inches
- Overall Length: 6.1 inches
- Grip Width: 1.06 inches
- Magazine Capacity: 6+1, 7+1, 8+1
- Sights: Black, fixed drift-able.
- Accessory Rail: no

== See also ==
- Colt Mustang
- Colt Mustang XSP
- Kimber Micro
- SIG Sauer P238
- SIG Sauer P938
- Springfield Armory 911
