= Kimber (name) =

Kimber is a surname and a given name.

== People with the surname ==
- Arnold Kimber (born 1947), Estonian politician
- Bobbie Kimber, English ventriloquist
- Cecil Kimber
- Chawne Kimber, African-American mathematician and quilter
- Edward Kimber (1719–1769), English novelist, journalist, and compiler of reference works; son of Isaac Kimber
- Glenn Kimber
- Sir Henry Kimber, 1st Baronet
- Isaac Kimber (1692–1755), English General Baptist minister, biographer, and journalist
- Jalen Kimber (born 2001), American football player
- Jarrod Kimber, Australian cricket writer and film-maker
- René-Joseph Kimber
- Sam Kimber
- Simon Kimber
- Sir Sidney Kimber
- Wayne Kimber
- William Kimber, English musician

== People with the given name ==
- Kimber Den
- Kimber Gabryszak
- Kimber Lee
- Kimber Lockhart
- Kimber Rickabaugh
- Kimber Rozier
- Kimber Sigler
- Kimber West

== Fictional characters ==
- Kimber Henry, in the American television series Nip/Tuck
- Kimber Benton, in the animated television series Jem

== See also ==
- Kimber (disambiguation)
- Kimberly (given name)
- Kimberley (surname)
