= SIG Sauer P290 =

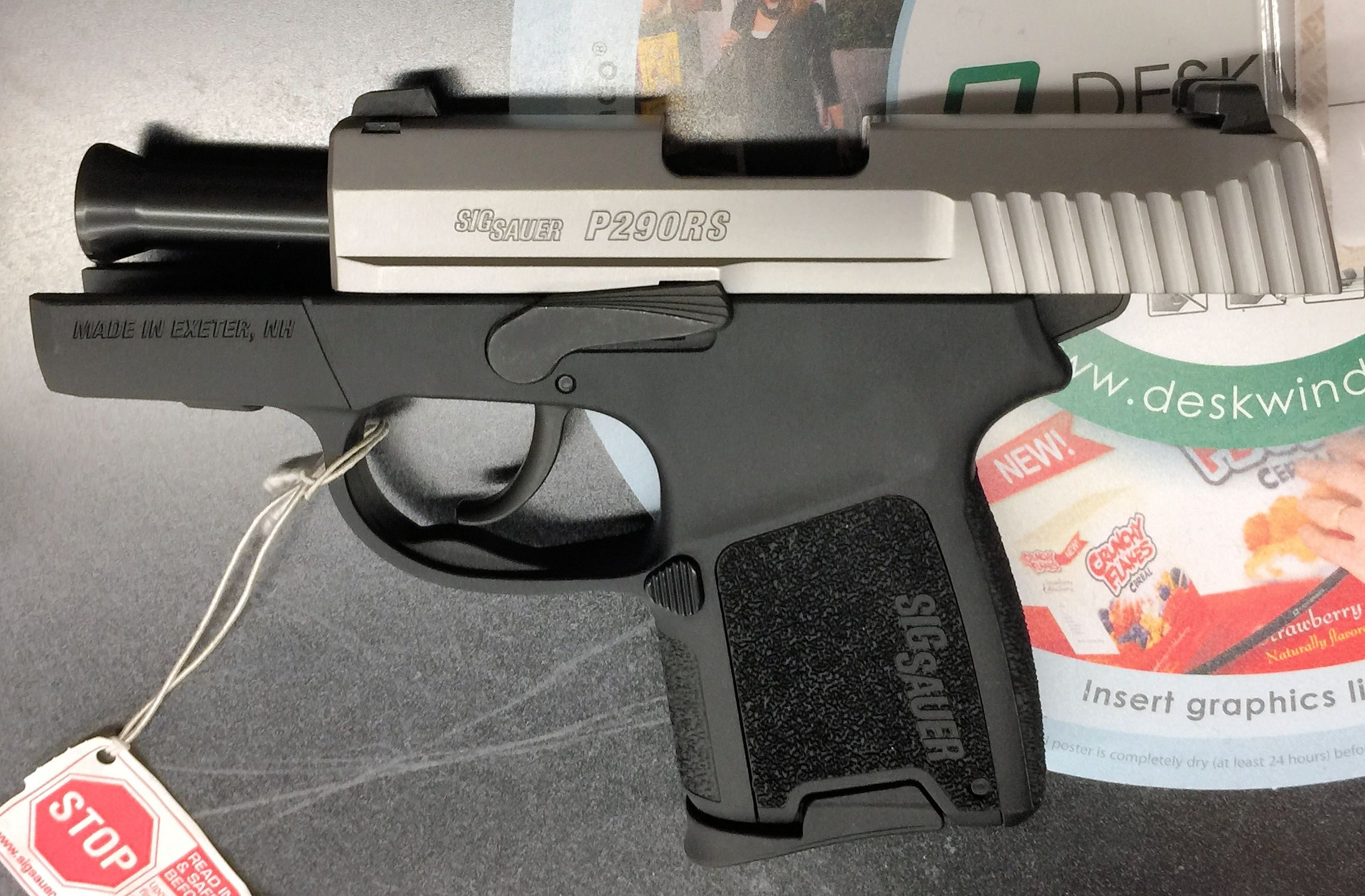
- SIG Sauer P290RS, .380 ACP made in Exeter, NH, locked open
- Place of origin: United States

Production history
- Designed: 2011
- Manufacturer: SIG Sauer, Exeter, NH, USA
- Produced: 2011–2017
- Variants: P290 with Laser, P290RS 9mm, P290RS .380 (both laser optional)

Specifications
- Mass: 465 g (16.4 oz)
- Length: 140 mm (5.5 in)
- Barrel length: 74 mm (2.9 in)
- Width: 23 mm (0.91 in)
- Height: 99 mm (3.9 in)
- Cartridge: 9×19mm Parabellum.380 ACP (P290RS only)
- Action: Short Recoil Locked Breech
- Rate of fire: Semi-automatic
- Feed system: Box magazines: 6-round, 8-round

The SIG Sauer P290 is a polymer frame subcompact handgun that was produced from 2011 to 2017 by SIG Sauer of Exeter, New Hampshire.

== Features ==
The P290 is chambered in 9×19mm Parabellum.

The P290 is not a modular design and comes in one caliber and frame size only.

=== Grip ===
The grip module has interchangeable panels to change thickness and tailor grip size to an individual’s hands.

=== Trigger ===
The P290 trigger is a double-action only (DAO) trigger which actuates a hammer to fire the cartridge.

=== Slide ===
The slide is stainless steel treated with Nitron, making it appear black. It rides on a stainless steel frame insert, which sits in the polymer frame.

=== Sights ===
The sights are tritium illuminated Siglight Night Sights with an optional proprietary laser sight. The sights feature two dots on the rear and one on the front. SIG Sauer handguns are combat sighted. (Note: "the front sight completely covers the bullseye of the target.")

=== Magazine ===
The P290 comes with one six-round magazine and one eight-round magazine with an extended baseplate.

The six-round magazine has a baseplate with a small finger rest and also comes with a flush-fit baseplate without the finger rest.

=== Accessories ===
Units come with a holster, safety loop lock, magazines, and flush baseplate.

== Variants ==
The P290 model was replaced by a new model in 2012 by the SIG Sauer P290RS.

The main difference is that the DAO trigger was redesigned. The shooter can now simply pull the trigger a second time if there is a misfire. This is called "Restrike Capability."

Prior to the restrike capability redesign, a misfire required that the shooter retract the slide to reset the trigger disconnector in order to attempt to fire a cartridge that failed to ignite on the first attempt.

Some other elements were redesigned also including the grip beavertail area, added finger support on the magazine baseplate, a reshaped magazine release and slide hold-open lever.

These handguns can be found with one or two magazines, holster, accessories and sometimes extra grip panels.

Magazines are usually a 6-round capacity magazine and an 8-round magazine with an extended finger tab giving a great deal more control. The P290RS was also made chambered in .380 ACP caliber.

== Replacement ==
The P290 series was replaced by the SIG Sauer P365.

== See also ==
- SIG P250
- SIG P938
- SIG P238
- Pocket pistol
