= Kimber Micro =

American pocket pistol

- Type: Semi-automatic pistol
- Place of origin: United States

Production history
- Designer: Kimber Manufacturing

The Kimber Micro is a lightweight, single-action pocket pistol chambered for the .380 ACP cartridge, produced by Kimber Manufacturing.

== History ==
This firearm model was first announced in 2013.

In 2014, Kimber introduced the Kimber Micro. This included remove-able grips and mainspring housing, rounded trigger guard, metal ambidextrous safety, drift-able fixed sights, single slot accessory rail, solid aluminum trigger, full length metal guide rod.

== Specifications ==
- Chambering: .380 ACP
- Weight: 12.90 ounces
- Weight with empty magazine: 13.4 ounces
- Trigger Pull: 7.0 pounds
- Barrel Length: 2.75 inches
- Overall Height: 4.0 inches
- Overall Length: 5.6 inches
- Grip Width: 1.08 inches
- Magazine Capacity: 7+1, 6+1
- Sights: Black, fixed drift-able.
- Accessory Rail: No

== See also ==
- Colt Mustang
- Colt Mustang XSP
- Kimber Micro 9
- SIG Sauer P238
- SIG Sauer P938
- Springfield Armory 911
