= Springfield Armory 911 =

Polymer frame semi-automatic handgun

- Type: Semi-automatic pistol
- Place of origin: United States

Production history
- Designed: c. 2017
- Manufacturer: Springfield Armory, Inc.
- Unit cost: $629 (MSRP, .380) $659 (MSRP, 9mm)
- Produced: 2018–present

Specifications
- Mass: 12.6 oz (360 g) (.380); 15.3 oz (430 g) (9mm)
- Length: 5.5 in (140 mm) (.380); 5.9 in (150 mm) (9mm)
- Barrel length: 2.7 in (69 mm) (.380); 3.0 in (76 mm) (9mm)
- Width: 1 in (25 mm)
- Height: 3.9 in (99 mm)
- Cartridge: .380 ACP, 9×19mm Parabellum
- Action: Single action
- Rate of fire: Semi-automatic
- Feed system: Box magazine: 6- or 7-round
- Sights: Fixed 3-dot iron sights

The Springfield Armory 911 is a concealed carry semi-automatic pistol manufactured by Springfield Armory, Inc. A smaller version of a single-action hammer-fired M1911 pistol, it was first introduced in 2018 chambered in .380 ACP; the 9mm version was announced a year later. A full-length metal guide rod, removable G10 grips, a squared trigger guard, an ambidextrous safety, and drift-able fixed sights are all features of the all-metal construction.

Similar offerings from other manufacturers include the Kimber Micro and Micro 9, and the SIG Sauer P238 and P938.
