= MEU(SOC) pistol =

Pistol, Caliber .45, MEU(SOC)
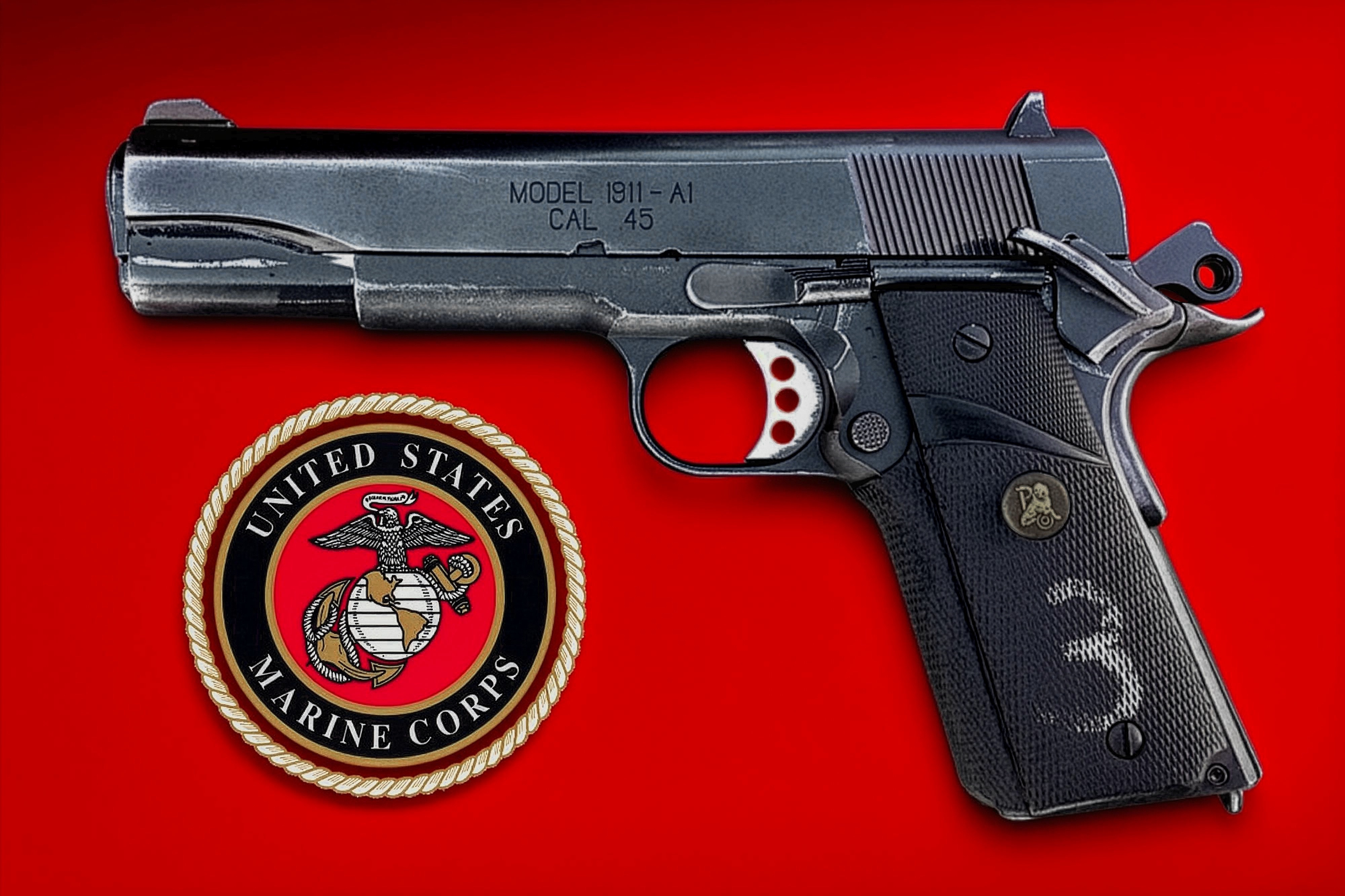
- MEU(SOC) 1911 pistol, built by PWS at Quantico, Virginia
- Type: Semi-automatic pistol
- Place of origin: United States

Service history
- In service: 1985–2022
- Used by: United States Marine Corps
- Wars: United States invasion of Panama; War in Somalia (1992–1993); War in Afghanistan (2001–2021); Iraq War

Production history
- Designer: Trained Weapons Training Battalion armorers at the Rifle Team Equipment Shop/USMC Precision Weapons Shop
- Designed: 1985

Specifications
- Mass: 2.44 lb (1.105 kg) empty, w/magazine
- Length: 8.25 in (210 mm)
- Barrel length: 5.03 in (127 mm)
- Cartridge: .45 ACP
- Action: Recoil-operated
- Muzzle velocity: 830 ft/s (244 m/s)
- Effective firing range: 70 m (77 yd) (maximum effective range)
- Feed system: 7 round detachable magazine

The MEU(SOC) pistol, ("Marine expeditionary unit (special operations capable) (MEU(SOC))") officially designated the M45 MEUSOC, is a magazine-fed, recoil-operated, single-action, semiautomatic pistol chambered for the .45 ACP cartridge. It is a variant of the M1911 for use by the Force Recon Element of the United States Marine Corps' Marine Expeditionary Units from 1985 until 2022. It is assigned National Stock Number 1005-01-370-7353.

== History ==
In the late 1980s, USMC Colonel Robert Young laid out a series of specifications and improvements to make Browning's design ready for 21st century combat, many of which have been included in MEU(SOC) pistol designs.

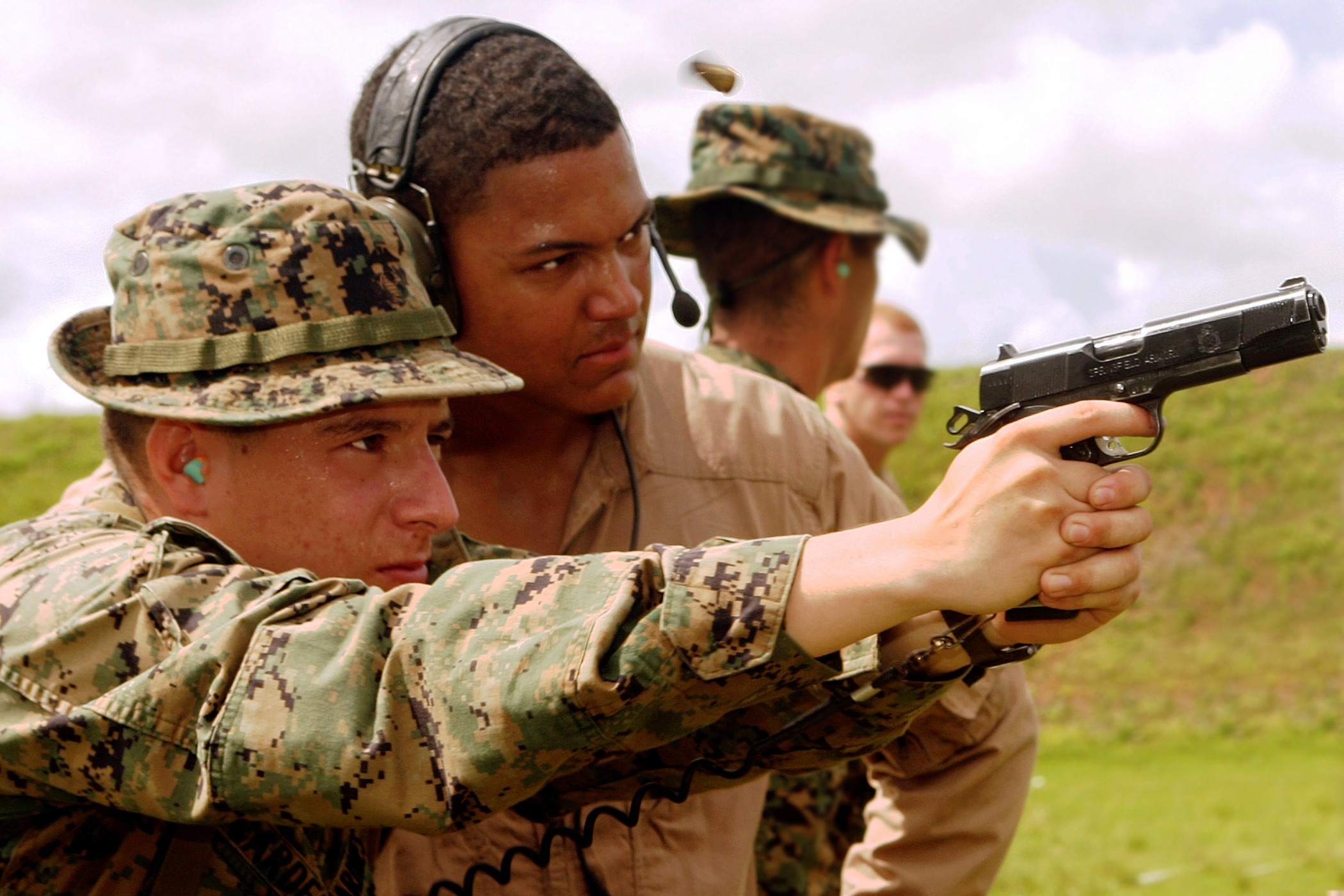
A Marine fires the MEU(SOC) pistol

In 2002, an article in American Handgunner stated that "Marine armorers from the Precision Weapons Section, MCBQ" are making 789 MEU (SOC) 1911s. The revised parts list included barrels, bushings, link pins, sear springs, ejectors, firing pin stops, mainspring housings and mainsprings, all from Nowlin Manufacturing. Slides were ordered from Springfield Armory, with front sight pins, beavertail safeties and recoil spring guides from Ed Brown. Novak was contracted for rear sights, Wilson Combat provided extractors and mag release buttons, while King's Gun Works supplied ambidextrous thumb safeties.

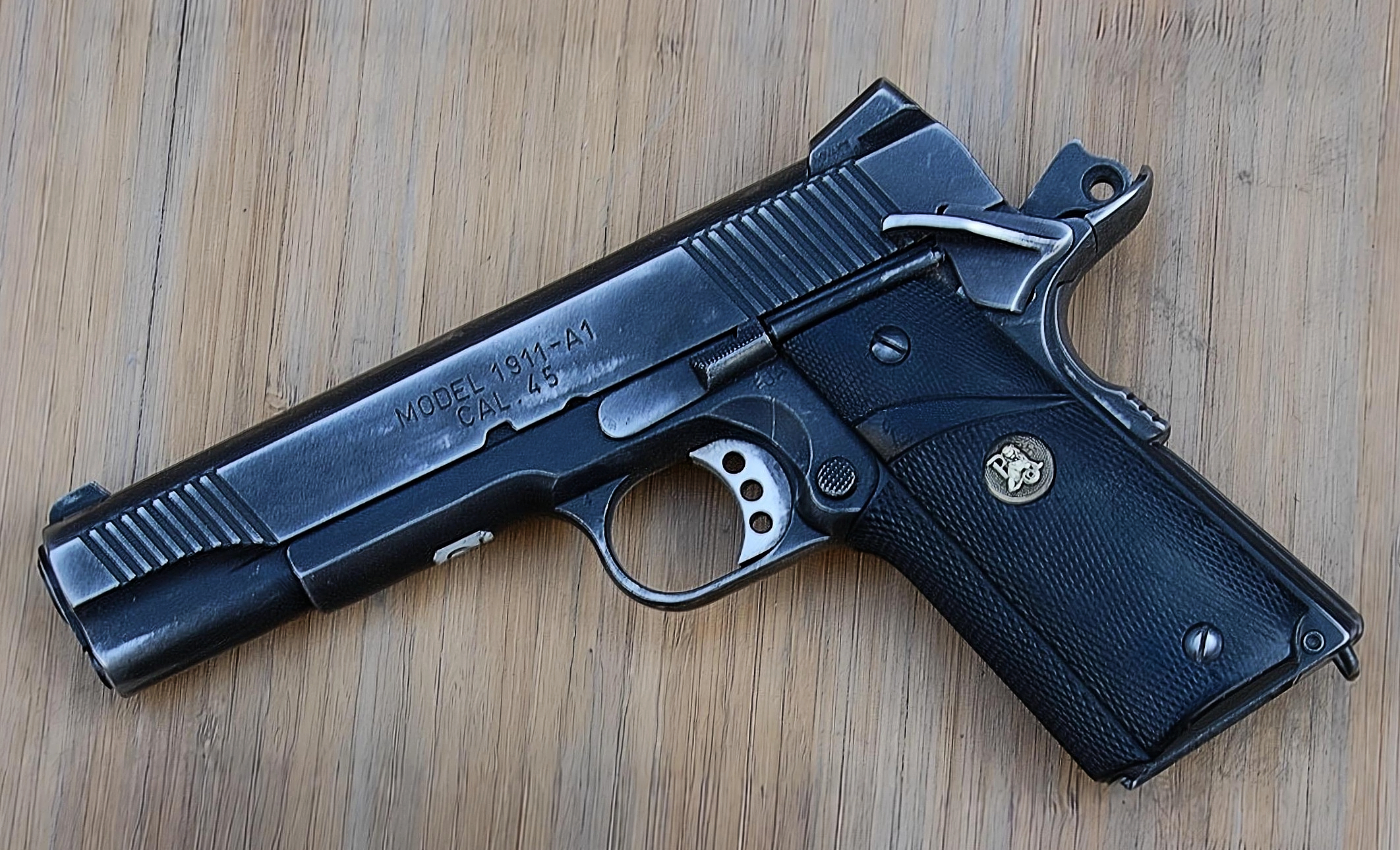
MEU(SOC) pistol with upgraded Springfield slide, Novak's sights, and Ed Brown grip safety

A Marine operator may shoot as many as 80,000 rounds from this pistol during a training-cycle and subsequent deployment. However, it is more common for a Marine to return the pistol to the PWS at Quantico for a rebuild after 10,000 rounds have been fired. A rebuild entails discarding almost all of the gun's parts except for the frame, which prior to 2003 was a U.S. Government frame last manufactured in 1945. The frame is inspected and reused if it is still within military specifications. There are frames in the USMC inventory that have had as many as 500,000 rounds fired through them.

Ken Davis, the Officer In Command of the Precision Weapons Shop, stated in 2001 that the M1911 is "the only pistol that can stand up to this use".

However, as the U.S. Marine Corps began its process of hand selecting members from its Force Recon to be submitted to USSOCOM as Marine Corps Special Operations Command, Detachment One (MCSOCOM Det-1), the selection of a .45 ACP M1911A1-based pistol meant roughly 150 units would be needed, more quickly than the PWS could produce them, as PWS were already backlogged with producing DMRs, USMC SAM-Rs, and updating M40A1s to M40A3s, so DET-1 began the search for COTS (commercial off-the-shelf) surrogates to use.

=== ICQB Pistol ===
Discovering that the Los Angeles Police Department was pleased with their special Kimber-made M1911 pistols, a single source request was issued to Kimber Manufacturing for a similarly built pistol, despite the imminent release of their TLE/RLII models. Kimber shortly began producing a limited number of what would be later termed the Interim Close Quarters Battle pistol (ICQB). Maintaining the simple recoil assembly, 5-inch barrel (though using a stainless steel match grade barrel), and internal extractor, the ICQB is not much different from Browning's original design.

The final units as issued to MCSOCOM Det-1 are the Kimber ICQBs with SureFire Integrated Military Pistol Light (IMPL), Dawson Precision rail, Gemtech TRL Tactical Retention Lanyards based upon the jury-rigged telephone cord versions, modified Safariland 6004 holsters, Simonich G-10 Gunner Grips manufactured by Simonich Knives (Strider Knives had previously replaced the original Pachmayr rubber grips), and Wilson Combat's '47D' 8-round magazines. Tritium Novak LoMount sights replaced the originals which were made in-house by the Marines.

=== Replacement ===
A source request was sent to Springfield Armory, and the Springfield Operator, based on the FBI's TRP pistol, was built. Due to wear and tear of the MEU(SOC) pistols and increasing numbers of Marine personnel in Force Recon and MARSOC, the U.S. Marines began looking commercially for replacements. Marine Corps Systems Command announced February 17, 2005, that it was going to purchase 150 Springfield Armory Professional Model pistols for use as MEU(SOC) pistols. This is the same pistol used by the Federal Bureau of Investigation SWAT and Hostage Rescue Teams; however, it had previously been rejected for adoption as the ICQB. Despite the planned purchase of the commercial pistols, Marine Corps Systems Command has continued to solicit parts to build additional MEU(SOC) pistols. In 2010, requirements were once more issued for an off-the-shelf system to replace the custom-built pistols. Three pistols were offered to the USMC as a replacement for current M45 Pistols. Colt offered a modified version of their O1980RG (Rail Gun) pistol, which is derived from their existing XSE line of 1911-style pistols with a desert sand-colored surface treatment and Novak night sights. Springfield Armory entered a variant of the full-sized Loaded MC Operator M1911A1 pistol with a military-standard 1913 rail, tritium night sights and finished with a two-tone black slide with an olive-drab green frame. The third entry from Karl Lippard Designs, a Colorado Springs-based arms maker, was called the Close Quarter Battle Pistol: an M1911A1-style pistol, built using S7 tool steel and a large number of proprietary components including accessory rail, grip safety, and sights.

On July 20, 2012, the Colt 1911 Rail Gun was selected and won a contract to initially deliver 4,000 pistols for MARSOC and Force Recon. The pistol was redesignated the M45A1 Close Quarter Battle Pistol (CQBP) and up to 12,000 will be delivered. The Colt design is considered an upgrade of the previous pistol, not an entirely new design.

== Specifications ==
The original pistols were hand-selected standard government issued Colt M1911A1s that were gutted, deburred, and prepared for additional use by the USMC Precision Weapon Section (PWS) in Quantico, Virginia. They were then assembled with after-market grip safeties, a rounded hammer, ambidextrous thumb safeties, lighter triggers made by Videcki, improved high-visibility sights, accurized match-grade barrels made by Bar-Sto, Pachmayr rubber grips, front cocking-serrations, and improved stainless steel magazines made by Wilson Combat.

The trigger-pull weight is specified at between 4.5 and 5.0 pounds-force (20 and 22 newtons).

The pistol's components are hand-fitted and are not interchangeable. The last four digits of the weapon's serial number are stamped on the top of the barrel, on the right-side of slide assembly, inside of the beavertail grip safety, on each side of the ambidextrous thumb safety, and on the inside face of the mainspring housing group.

== M45A1 CQBP ==
In 2012, the Marine Corps awarded Colt a contract for up to 12,000 M45A1 pistols with an initial order of 4036 pistols. The Marine Corps issued the M45A1 to Force Reconnaissance companies, MARSOC and Special Reaction Teams from the Provost Marshal's Office.

The improved M45A1 CQBP features several changes to the original M1911A1 design. One feature is the dual recoil spring system that spreads out the recoil force of the .45 ACP round by lowering the peak force of the recoil pulse. It also has 3-dot tritium night sights, a 5-inch national match barrel, ambidextrous safety, picatinny rail, and a desert tan Cerakote finish.

In 2016, USMC command stated that MARSOC had replaced the M45A1 with the Glock 19, largely from a logistic standpoint, not from a performance and reliability standpoint, as a result of other SOCOM branches using the Glock 19. As of March 2019, Force Recon, and other units still use the M45A1 and some units have the Glock 19 or Beretta M9A1 as an alternative.

The current M45A1 does not have a “USMC” rollmark on the slide for civilian sales. Marine HQ requested Colt to stop marking the pistols as such. All M45A1s are currently marked “COLT***M45A1” and have a darker, flat dark earth Ion Bond type finish referred to by Colt as “Decobond”. While not as corrosion resistant, it is a far more durable finish.

The M45A1 ships with Wilson Combat 47 7 round magazines, and is a production grade weapon, rolling off the same line as the commercial M45A1 with identical markings and parts. Colt also offers a custom shop civilian model to achieve higher accuracy, but the Marine issue model is the production grade pistol.

== Gallery ==
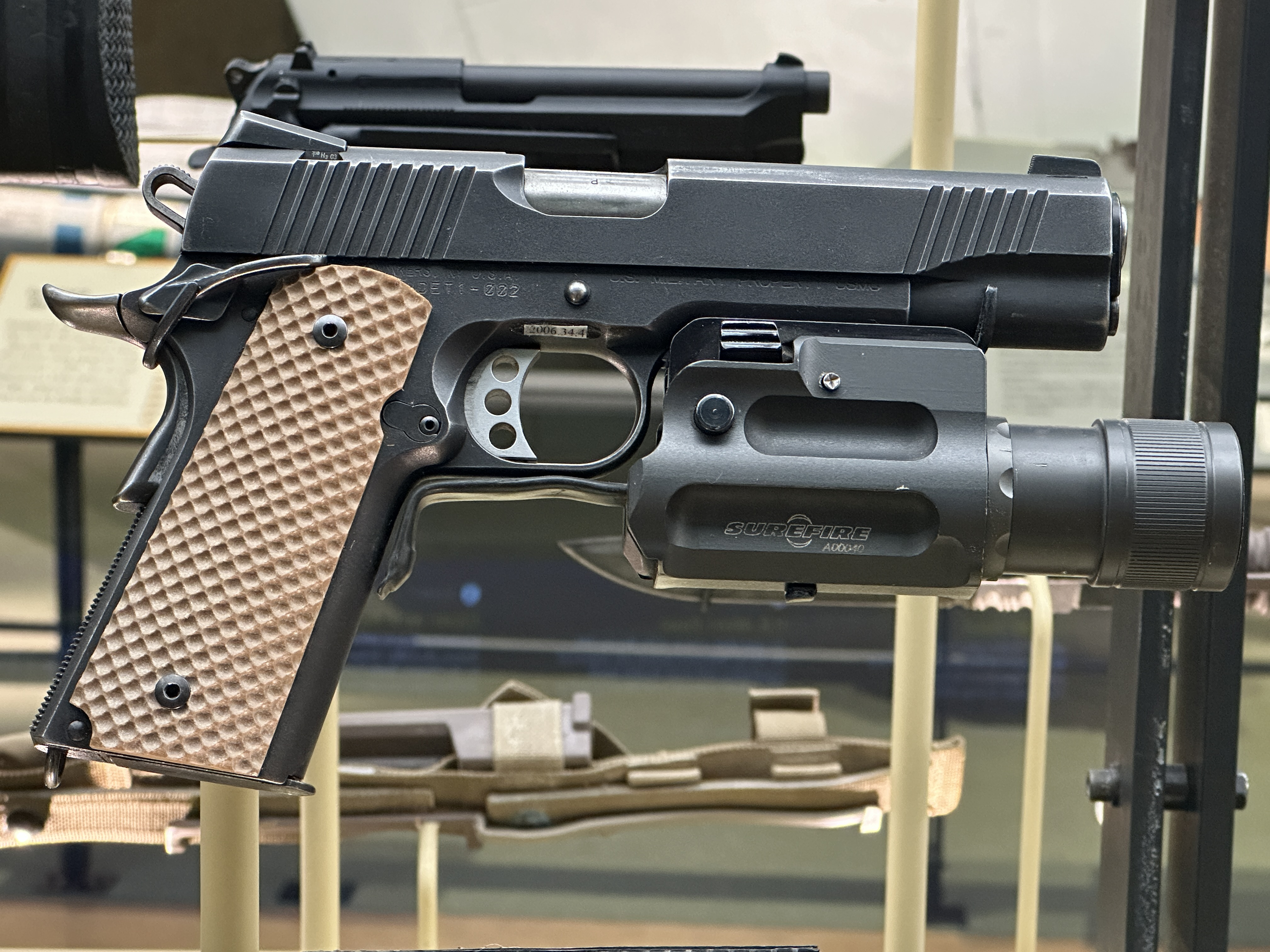
Kimber ICQB pistol with "U.S. MILITARY PROPERTY USMC" marking on the frame

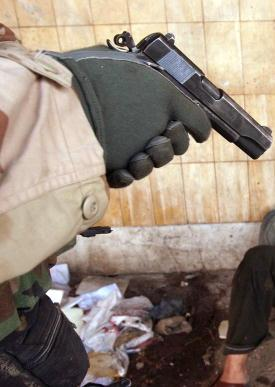
Marine using a MEU(SOC) pistol in Iraq

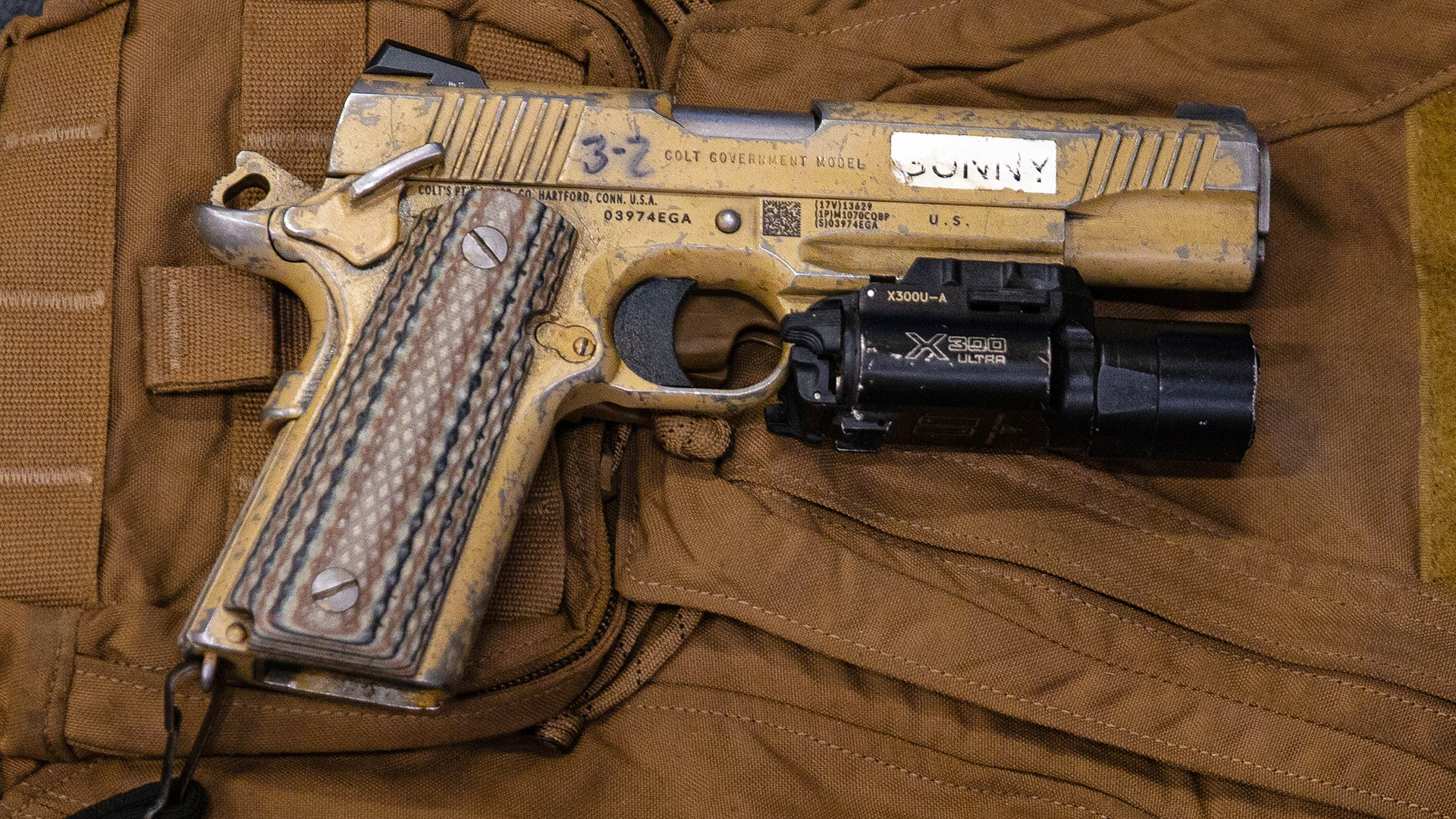
Hard used USMC M45A1 pistol

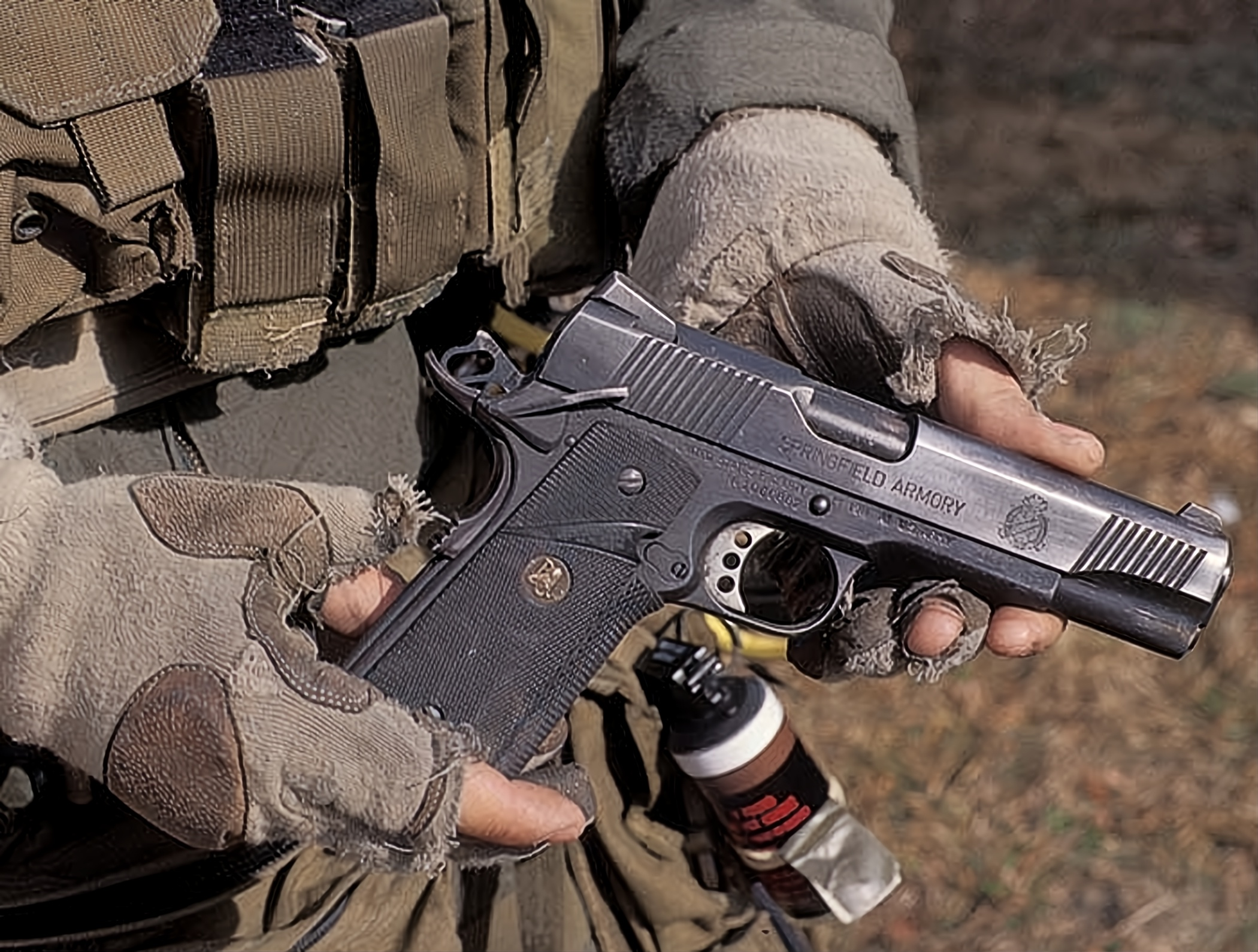
MEU(SOC) pistol with WWII USGI frame

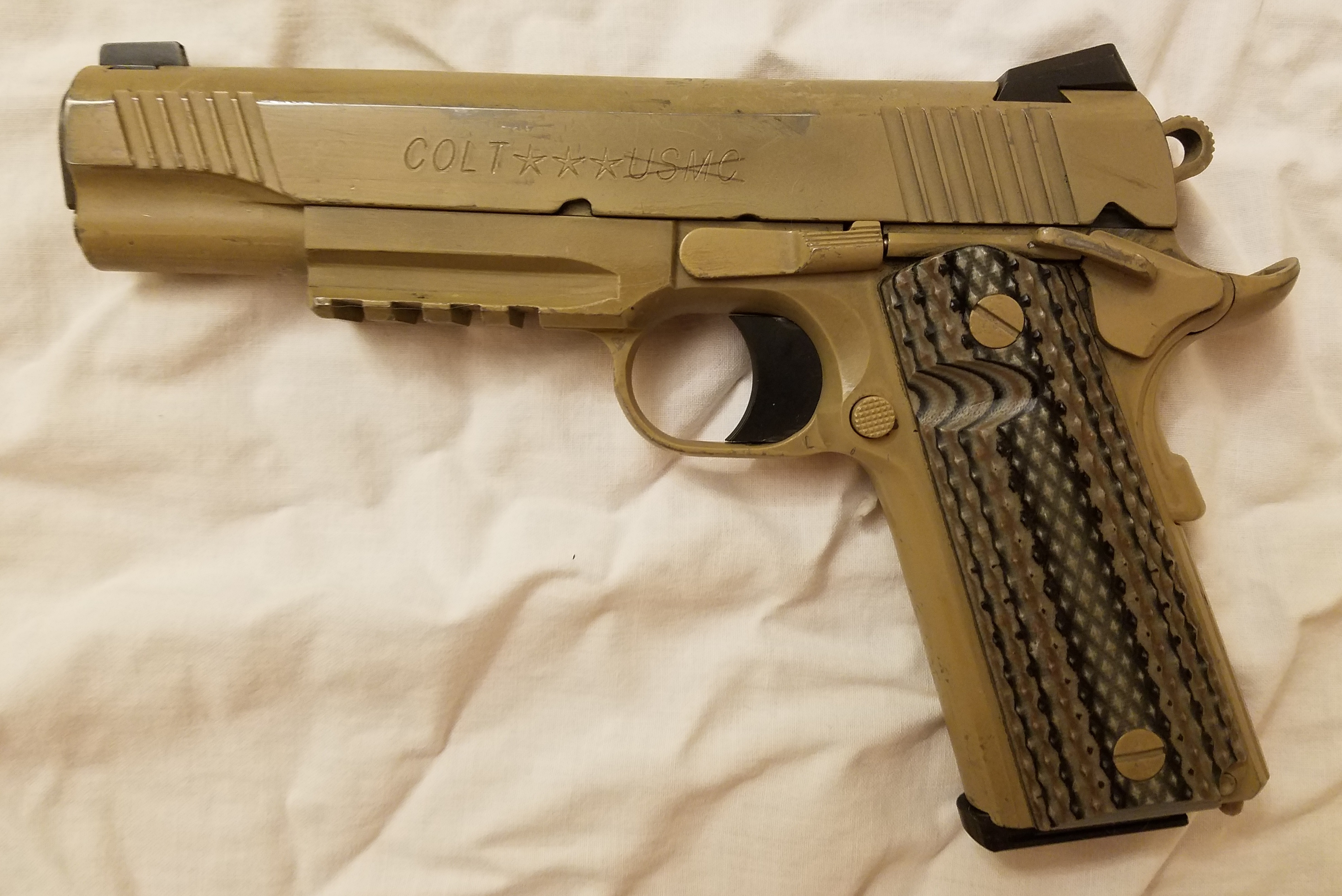
Colt M45A1 pistol, decommissioned

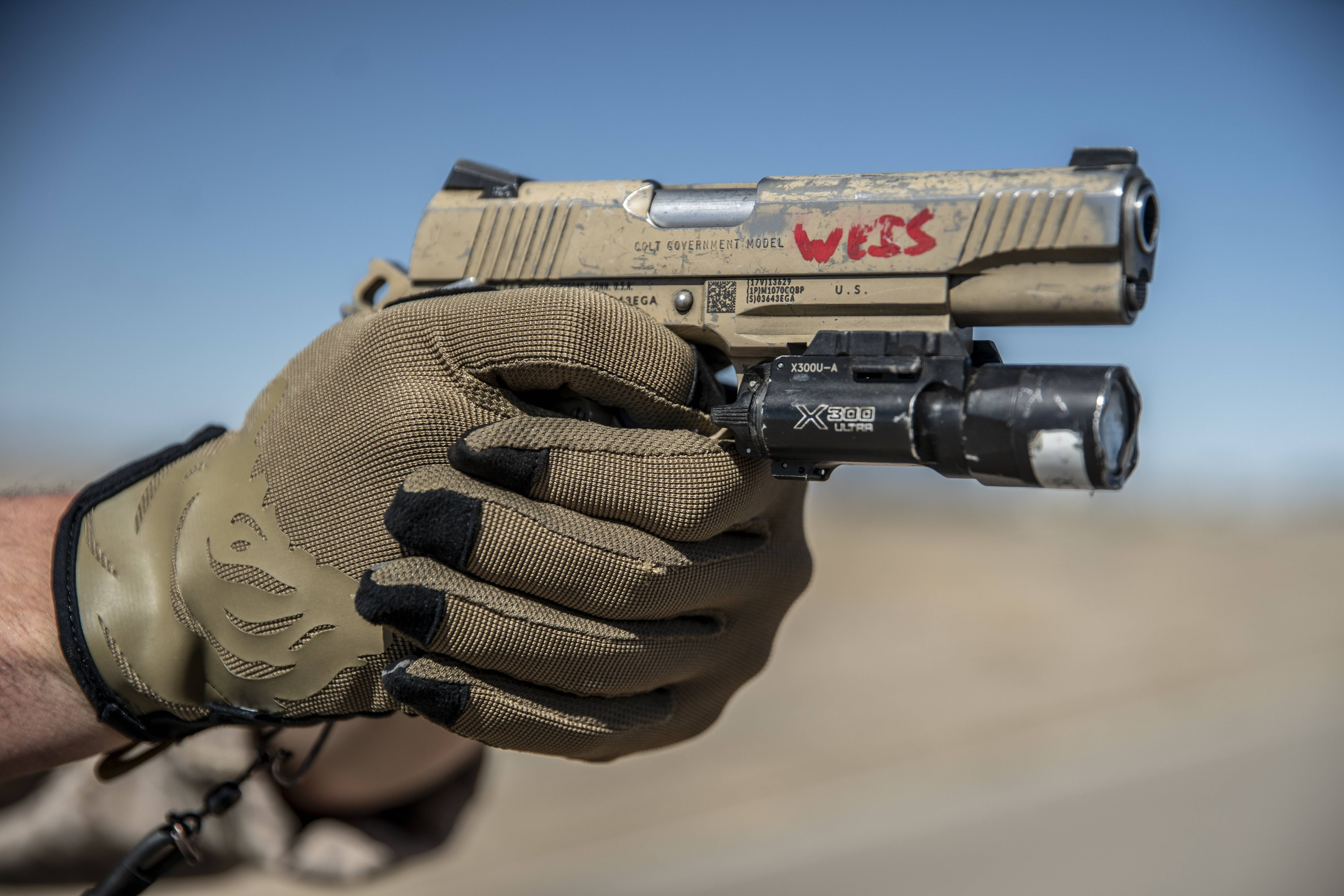
A U.S. Marine with the All Domain Reconnaissance Detachment, 11th Marine Expeditionary Unit, sights in with an M1911 pistol while conducting dry-fire drills during Realistic Urban Training exercise at Marine Corps Air Station Yuma, Arizona, Feb. 21, 2021.

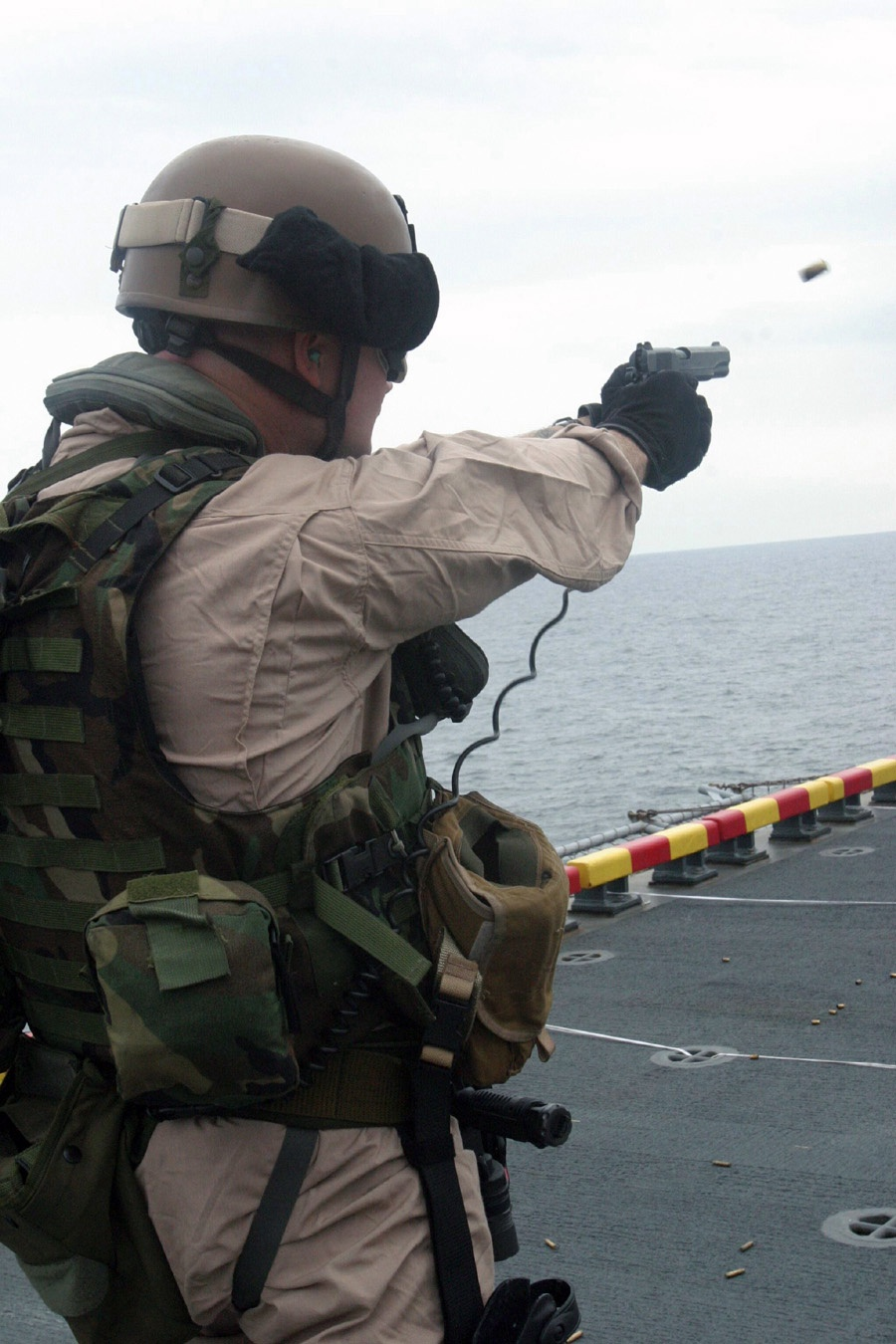
USMC STAFF Sergeant Jonathan D. White SNCO, 31st MEU Deep Reconnaissance Platoon, fire his 1911A1 automatic pistol during live-fire training aboard the USS ESSEX (LHD 2). The 31st MEU DRP is assigned to Amphibious Squadron Eleven (PHIBRON 11).

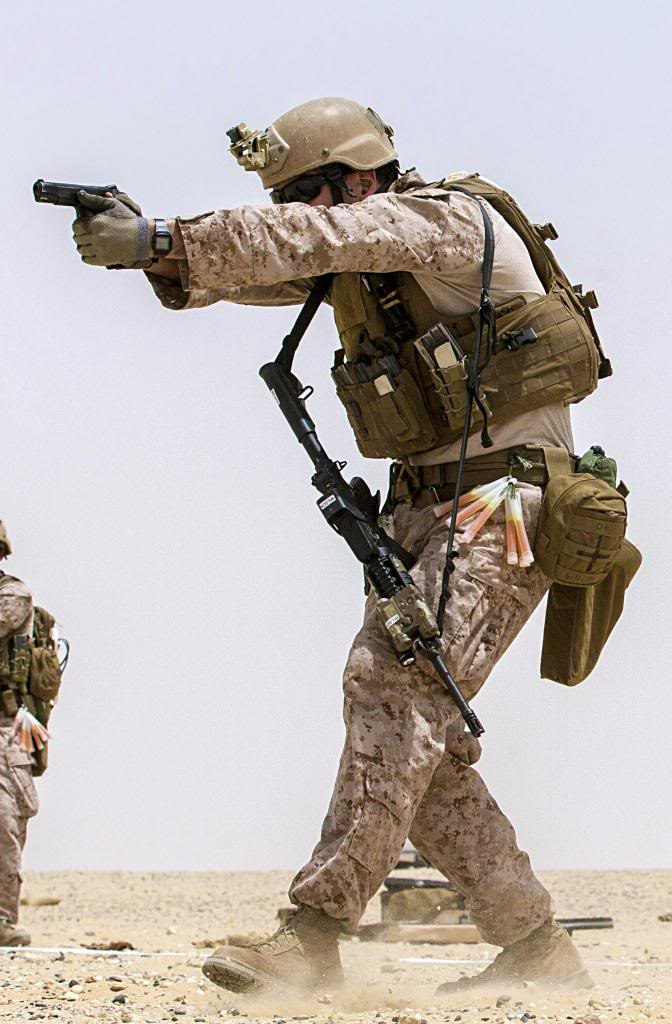
26th Marine Expeditionary Unit pistol training in Jordan

== See also ==
- List of weapons of the U.S. Marine Corps
- Kimber Custom
