= The London Magazine =

British literary periodical

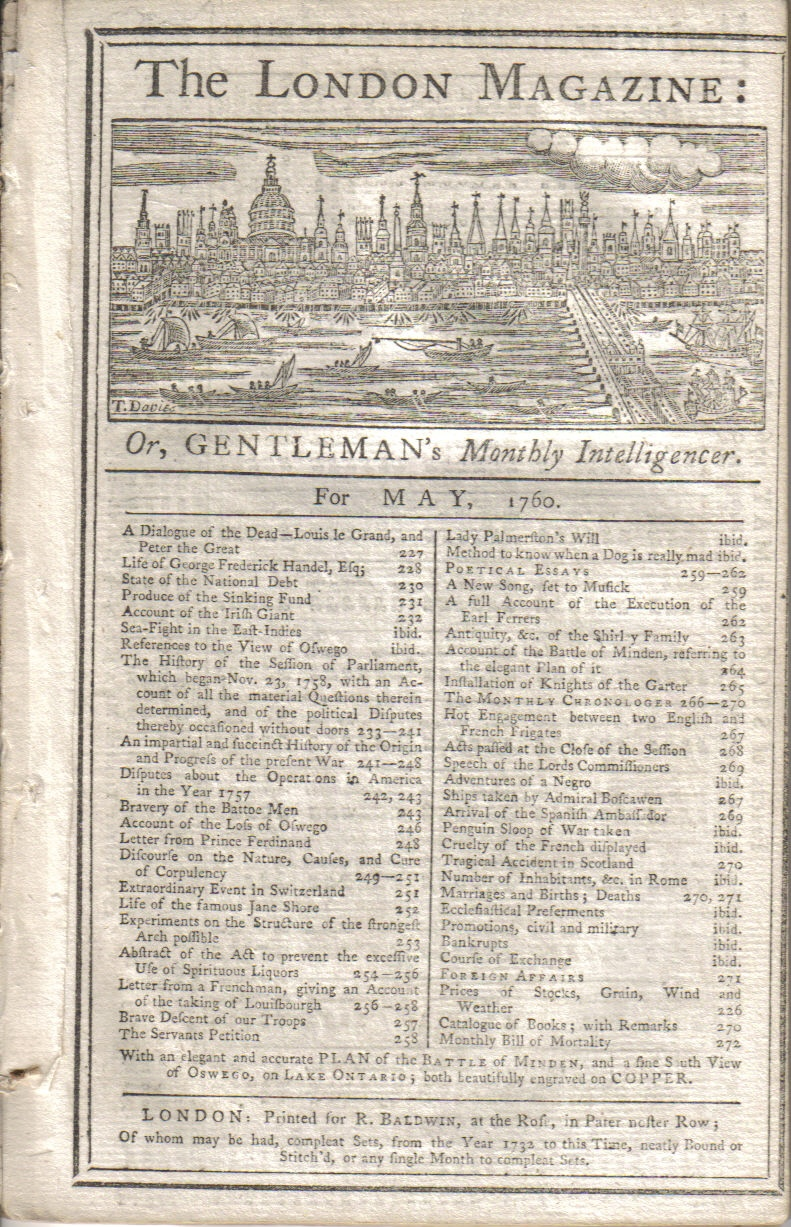
- Cover of the issue "For May, 1760."
- Editor: Steven O'Brien
- Categories: Literary magazine
- Frequency: Bimonthly
- Publisher: Burhan Al-Chalabi
- Founder: Isaac Kimber
- Founded: 1732
- Country: United Kingdom
- Based in: London
- Language: English
- Website: www.thelondonmagazine.org
- ISSN: 0024-6085

The London Magazine is the title of six different publications that have appeared in succession since 1732. All six have focused on the arts, literature and poetry. A number of Nobel Laureates, including Annie Ernaux, Albert Camus, Doris Lessing and Nadine Gordimer, have been published in its pages. It is England's oldest literary journal.

== 1732–1785 ==
The London Magazine, or, Gentleman's Monthly Intelligencer was founded in 1732 in political opposition and rivalry to the Tory-supporting Gentleman's Magazine and ran for 53 years until its closure in 1785. Edward Kimber became editor in 1755, succeeding his father Isaac Kimber. Henry Mayo was editor from 1775 to 1783. Publishers included Thomas Astley.

== 1820–1829 ==
In 1820 the London Magazine was resurrected by the publishers Baldwin, Craddock & Joy under the editorship of John Scott who formatted the magazine along the lines of the Edinburgh publication Blackwood's Magazine. It was during this time that the magazine published poems by William Wordsworth, Percy Bysshe Shelley, John Clare and John Keats.

In September 1821 the first of two instalments of Thomas De Quincey's Confessions of an English Opium-Eater appeared in the magazine. Scott quickly began a literary row with writers for Blackwood's Magazine, in particular with John Gibson Lockhart, on various topics, including Blackwood's virulent criticism of the "Cockney School", under which Leigh Hunt and John Keats were grouped. The quarrel ended in a fatal duel between Scott and Lockhart's close friend and colleague J. H. Christie. Scott lost the duel and his life in 1821.

The London Magazine continued under the editorship of John Taylor. Its contributors included Thomas Hood, William Hazlitt and Charles Lamb. During this time Lamb published the first series of his Essays of Elia, beginning in 1820. Taylor's insistent tampering with contributors' poems led many of the staff, including Lamb and Hazlitt, to abandon the magazine, which ceased publication in 1829.

== 1840 ==
Simpkin, Marshall and Co. published The London Magazine, Charivari, and Courrier des Dames; a Proteus in Politics, a Chameleon in Literature, and a Butterfly in the World of Bon Ton, edited by Richard Fennell. The first item in the inaugural issue in February 1840 was "Behind the Scenes, with the Prologue to Our Little Drama", which begins: "[Manager Typo is discovered pacing up and down the stage ..." (image 10).

== 1875–1879 ==
The title was revived in November 1875 for a monthly edited by Will Williams. It has been described as "a society paper", and as "a journal of a type more usual in Paris than London, written for the sake of its contributors rather than of the public".

A significant development in this period was the arrival of William Ernest Henley, who accepted the post of editor, serving from 15 December 1877 for the closing two years (1877–1879). Henley anonymously contributed tens of his own poems to the magazine, "chiefly in old French forms," some of which have been termed "brilliant" (and were later published in a compilation by Gleeson White). This period also saw the publication of Robert Louis Stevenson's first fictional works, later collected in one volume as "New Arabian Nights".

The London ceased publication with the issue dated 5 April 1879.

== 1898–1933 ==
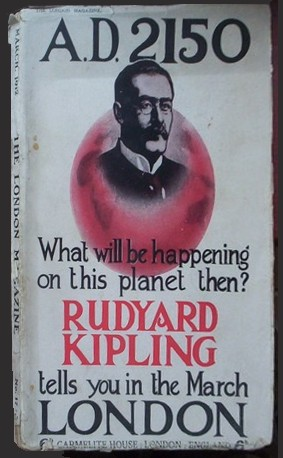
Cover, March 1912

In 1901 The Harmsworth Magazine was relaunched as The London Magazine by Cecil Harmsworth, proprietor of the Daily Mail at the time. The editor was Henry Beckles Willson. Amalgamated Press continued publishing it until 1930, when it was retitled the New London Magazine. The Australian scholar Sue Thomas has referred to it as "an important informer ... of popular literary tastes in the late Victorian and Edwardian periods". Among Joseph Conrad's contributions to The London Magazine was the serialization of his novel "Heart of Darkness" in three parts (from February to April 1899). George Orwell published his essay "A Hanging" in the magazine in August of 1931, considered a classic of modern English literature. Despite the acclaim it enjoyed, the magazine closed in 1933.

== 1954–present ==
In 1954 a new periodical was given the title the London Magazine under the editorship of John Lehmann, who largely continued the tradition of his previous magazine New Writing. It was endorsed by T. S. Eliot as a non-university-based periodical that would "boldly assume the existence of a public interested in serious literature". Susan Sontag, Eugene Ionesco, Sylvia Plath, Marguerite Duras, Gabriel García Márquez, Hilary Mantel and Annie Ernaux were among the iconic writers who contributed to the magazine during this period. In 1961 the magazine changed hands and came under the editorship of Lehmann's fellow poet and critic Alan Ross. Publication continued until Ross's death in 2001. Under both Lehmann and Ross the magazine was published by Chatto & Windus.

In 2001 it was relaunched by Christopher Arkell, who appointed the poet and literary critic Sebastian Barker as editor. Barker retired in early 2008 and Sara-Mae Tuson took over.

In July 2009 Arkell sold the magazine to Burhan Al-Chalabi, who is now the publisher.

The London Magazine has been relaunched under the current editorship. It is published six times a year. It publishes both emerging and established writers from around the world.
