= Kimber Eclipse =

- Type: Semi-automatic pistol
- Place of origin: United States

Production history
- Manufacturer: Kimber Manufacturing
- Produced: 2002 – present

Specifications
- Mass: 38 ounces (1077g)
- Length: 8.7 inches (221mm)
- Barrel length: 5 inches (127mm)
- Width: 1.28 inches (32.5mm)
- Height: 5.25 inches (133mm)
- Cartridge: .45 ACP, 10mm Auto
- Action: Short recoil
- Feed system: 8-round box magazine (+1 in chamber)
- Sights: adjustable

The Kimber Eclipse is a model 1911 semi-automatic pistol chambered for the .45 ACP and 10mm Auto cartridges. It is made by Kimber Manufacturing in Yonkers, New York. There are several models of Kimber Eclipse, of different sizes and with different combinations of features.

== Features ==
The Kimber Eclipse has a bi-tone (polished) stainless/black finish, tritium dot front and rear underline night sights, a lightweight aluminum trigger, a commander style hammer, and a beavertail grip safety. It has front and back strap checkering, and rear and forward cocking serrations on the slide.

The stainless steel slide and frame are finished in a matte black oxide, then all flat surfaces are brush polished, leaving the recessed and curved surfaces dark and contrasting.

The series II designation indicates that the pistol has an internal firing pin block that is disengaged by depressing the grip safety.

In 2002 the Kimber Eclipse won Shooting Industry magazine's "Academy of Excellence" award for Handgun of the Year.

== Specifications ==
- Recoil spring: 16 pounds-22 pounds (depends on model).
- Frontstrap checkering: 30 lines per inch.
- Slide: Stainless steel, brush polished and with rear and front serrations.
- Barrel: Steel match grade.
- Bushing: Stainless steel match grade.
- Twist rate (left hand): 16.
- Sights: Meprolight tritium bar-dot night sights. (adjustable on Pro Target II and Target II models)
- Grips: Black and silver laminated double diamond.
- Trigger: Premium aluminum match grade. Factory setting 4 - 5 pounds.
- Effective range: 65 Meters (depends on shooter's sight adjustment).

== Kimber Eclipse Target II ==
The Kimber Eclipse Target II is a model of Kimber Eclipse. It is a full-sized model 1911, with a five-inch barrel, and is chambered in .45 ACP. It has adjustable target sights with a radius of 6.8 inches.

== See also ==
- M1911 Colt pistol
- Kimber Custom
