= Zimber =

Zimber used as a surname and believed to be Germanic but the meaning is undefined. Used as a surname in Eastern Europe since the 17th Century.

Zimber may be a variant of the German word Kimber or members of a historic second century Germanic ethnic group. Now called the Cimbri. Kimber (name) is also a forename and surname.

Zimber and Zimmer is a German exonym for Cembra and related to the Cimbri ancestry.

Zimber may also be a corruption of Zimble(r) or Tsimbl. This was an ancient medieval stringed instrument played by plucking the strings with the fingers or a plectrum. This instrument is similar to a Psaltery, Dulcimer or Cymbalom. Note: The German word Zimbel is cymbal (music), while Zimbal is Cymbalom.

Zimber could also be a variant of the German word Zimmer[mann], chamber/carpenter (cf. timber).

== People with this or similar surname ==
- Diana Zimber, a member of the Tommy Gorman family
- Gisela Zimber, German writer
- Liane Zimbler, née Juliana Fischer - an early female architect

== Places ==
- Zimber or Zimmers, a German exonyms name for the Italian Cembra a municipality of Trentino
