= Kimber Custom =

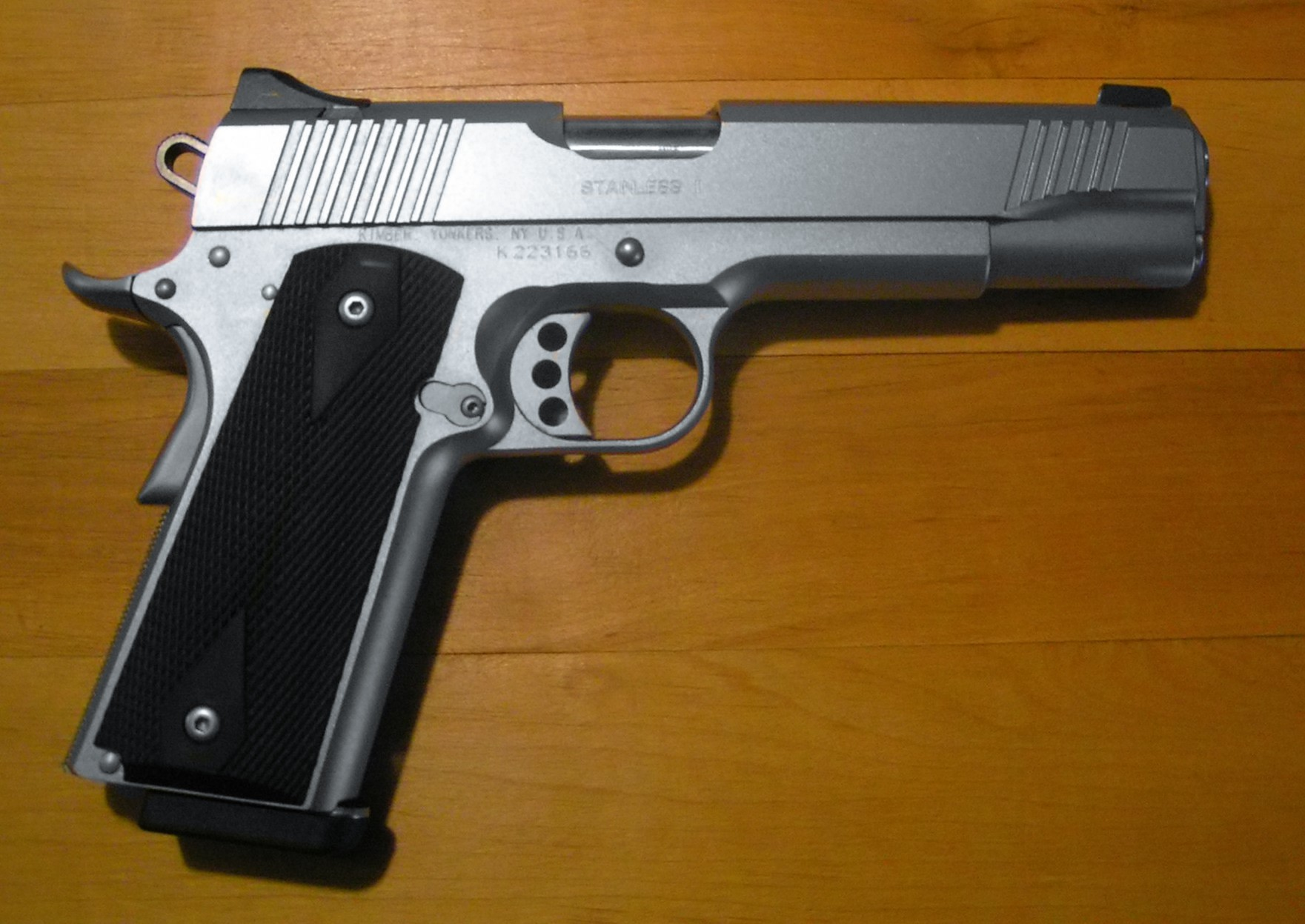
- Kimber Custom Stainless II
- Type: Semi-automatic pistol
- Place of origin: United States

Service history
- In service: 1997–present
- Used by: LAPD SWAT; OCSD SWAT; USMC Force Recon

Production history
- Manufacturer: Kimber
- Variants: Custom; Custom II

Specifications
- Mass: 38 oz (1,077g)
- Length: 8.7 inches (220.98mm)
- Barrel length: 5 inches (127mm)
- Width: 1.3 inches (33mm)
- Height: 5.3 inches (134.62mm)
- Caliber: .45 ACP; 9×19mm 10mm Auto
- Action: semi-automatic, single action
- Feed system: 7, 8 or 10-round magazine

The Kimber Custom is an M1911 style semi-automatic pistol. It is designed, manufactured, and distributed by Kimber Manufacturing, Inc. in Yonkers, New York.

== Overview ==
The Custom is made in a variety of styles with different features and finishes. As an M1911 style pistol, it is usually chambered in .45 ACP.

It also has been produced in other calibers, including .40 S&W, 10mm Auto, 9mm Luger, and .38 Super.

The individual gun's caliber is stamped on top of the barrel and is visible with the slide in battery (fully forward).

== Features ==
The Custom is a full-sized model 1911, with a five-inch (127mm) barrel.

The frame and slide are made of steel. The Custom utilizes a single full-length guide rod, necessitating the serrations on the front of the slide for press checks.

Although the Custom is considered Kimber's base model, it has a number of features that were formerly found only on customized model 1911s, such as a lowered ejection port, custom trigger, beveled magazine well, extended thumb safety, and beavertail grip safety.

The original Custom model has been superseded by the Custom II. The Custom II has an internal firing pin safety.

This feature is designed to provide additional assurance that the gun will not fire if dropped, as the firing pin is blocked from striking the chambered cartridge unless the grip safety is depressed.

== Variants ==
=== Custom TLE II ===
The Kimber Custom TLE II is a model of Kimber Custom; the designation "TLE" stands for "Tactical Law Enforcement".

The TLE is identical, except for the markings, to a special model that was designed for use by the LAPD SWAT team.

Unlike the standard Custom, it comes with tritium bar-dot night sights and 30 lines per inch frontstrap checkering.

The TLE has been manufactured in the following variations:

- Custom TLE II, the standard variation and the same as the LAPD SWAT model.
- Custom TLE II (LG), with laser grip sights.
- Custom TLE/RL II, with an accessory mounting rail.
- Stainless TLE II, with a stainless steel finish.
- Stainless TLE/RL II, with a stainless steel finish and an accessory mounting rail.

=== Warrior series ===
The Kimber Warrior and Desert Warrior are models that are based on a special version of the Custom that was built for the United States Marine Corps Forces Special Operations Command.

The Warrior and Desert Warrior have a frame-integrated M1913 light rail, Kimber Meprolight tritium night sights, and Kimber's own special grips that are very similar to the Gunner grips in coyote brown. They are delivered with Kimber factory magazines. They are otherwise the same as the ICQB pistols.

The Warrior has a matte black KimPro finish and a standard Custom trigger. The Desert Warrior comes in a green-tan KimPro finish that would blend in with desert camouflage, and has a solid trigger.

=== ICQB ===
The MARSOC pistol, known as the Kimber ICQB (Interim Close Quarter Battle) pistol, does not have an internal firing pin block as seen on the rest of the current Kimber Custom models, hence a "II" does not follow the Warrior or Desert Warrior's names.

These pistols have an ambidextrous thumb safety, a lanyard loop, an internal extractor, and, in contrast to other Custom models, a standard length recoil spring guide rod to allow easier field stripping without tools.

The final units as issued to MCSOCOM Det-1 are the Kimber ICQBs with SureFire Integrated Military Pistol Light (IMPL), Dawson Precision rail, Gemtech TRL Tactical Retention Lanyards based upon the jury-rigged telephone cord versions, modified Safariland 6004 holsters, Simonich G-10 Gunner Grips manufactured by Simonich Knives (Strider Knives had previously replaced the original Pachmayr rubber grips), and Wilson Combat's '47D' 8-round magazines.

Tritium Novak LoMount sights replaced the originals which were made in-house by the Marines.

=== Other Custom models ===
Other models of Kimber Custom include the following:

- Stainless II, with a frame and slide made of stainless steel, and therefore silver in color instead of matte black.
- Custom Target II, with adjustable target sights.
- Stainless Target II, with adjustable target sights and a stainless steel frame and slide.
- Royal II, with a polished blue finish and rosewood grips.

== Related models ==
Kimber has also produced several higher-end full-sized model 1911 pistols that are closely based on the Custom, but are not considered part of the Custom line due to their additional features and higher price. These include the following:

- Eclipse Custom II, with bi-tone stainless and black finish and night sights.
- Tactical Custom II, with gray aluminum frame, black steel slide, night sights, ambidextrous thumb safety, and extended magazine well.
- Tactical Entry II, with gray stainless steel frame, black steel slide, night sights, ambidextrous thumb safety, extended magazine well and accessory mounting rail.
- Custom CDP II, with black aluminum frame, stainless steel slide, night sights, ambidextrous thumb safety, and "carry melt" rounded edges.
- Custom Covert II, with desert camouflage aluminum frame, black steel slide, laser light grips, standard length guide rod, night sights, lanyard loop, and "carry melt" rounded edges.
- SIS Custom, with gray finish, flat top slide, standard length guide rod, night sights with cocking shoulder, ambidextrous thumb safety, and "carry melt" rounded edges, and without a firing pin safety.
- Custom Crimson Carry II, with aluminum frame, matte black steel slide, and rosewood finish laser grips.
- Super Carry Custom, with aluminum frame, matte black steel slide, night sights with cocking shoulder, round heel frame, "carry melt" rounded edges, and without a firing pin safety.

== Gallery ==
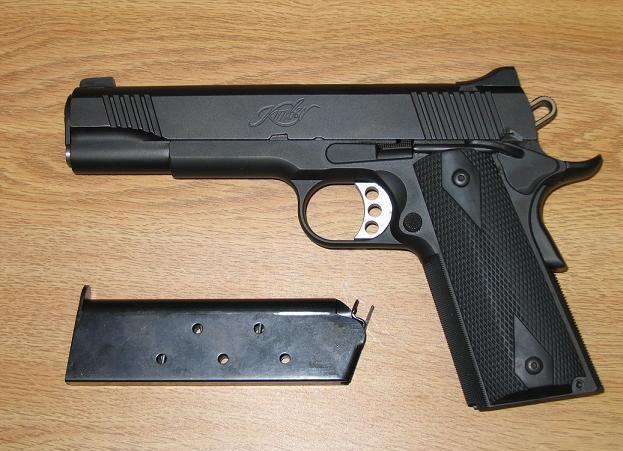
Kimber Custom TLE II, left side with magazine ejected

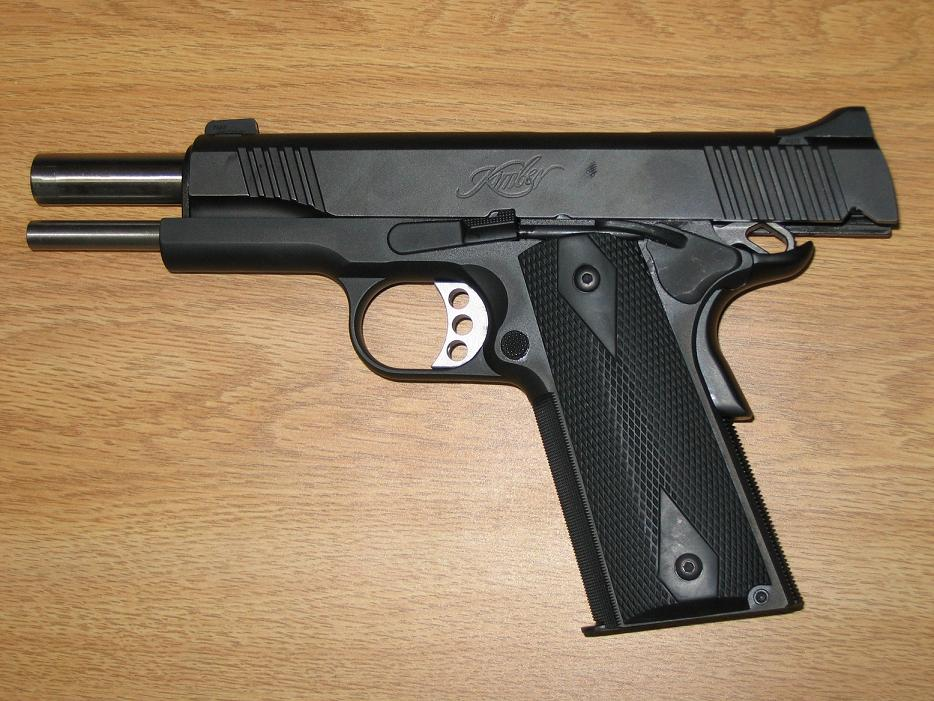
Kimber Custom TLE II, slide locked to the rear

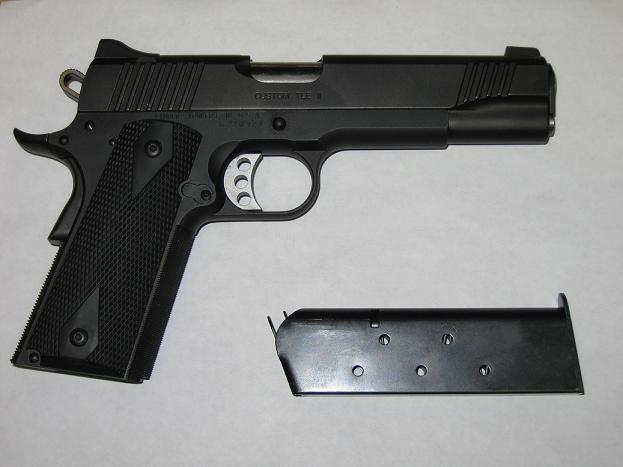
Kimber Custom TLE II, right side with magazine ejected

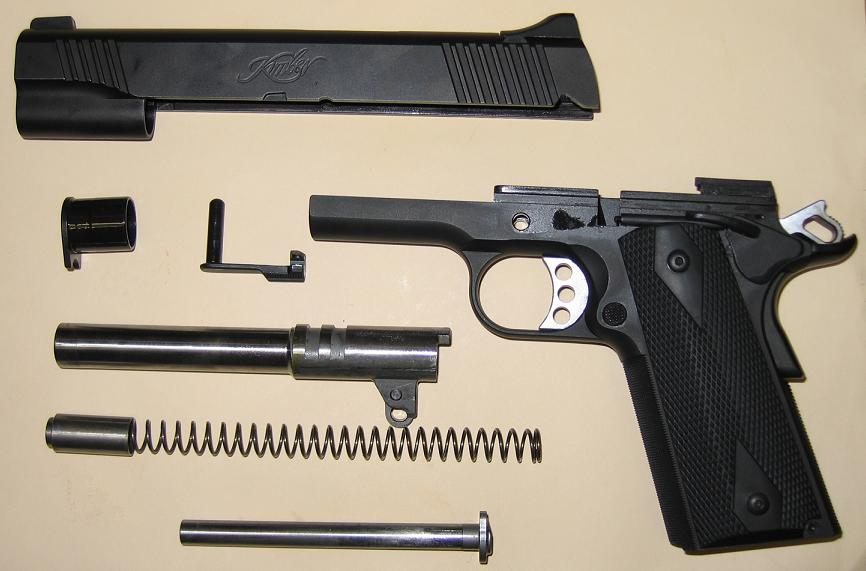
Kimber Custom TLE II, field stripped

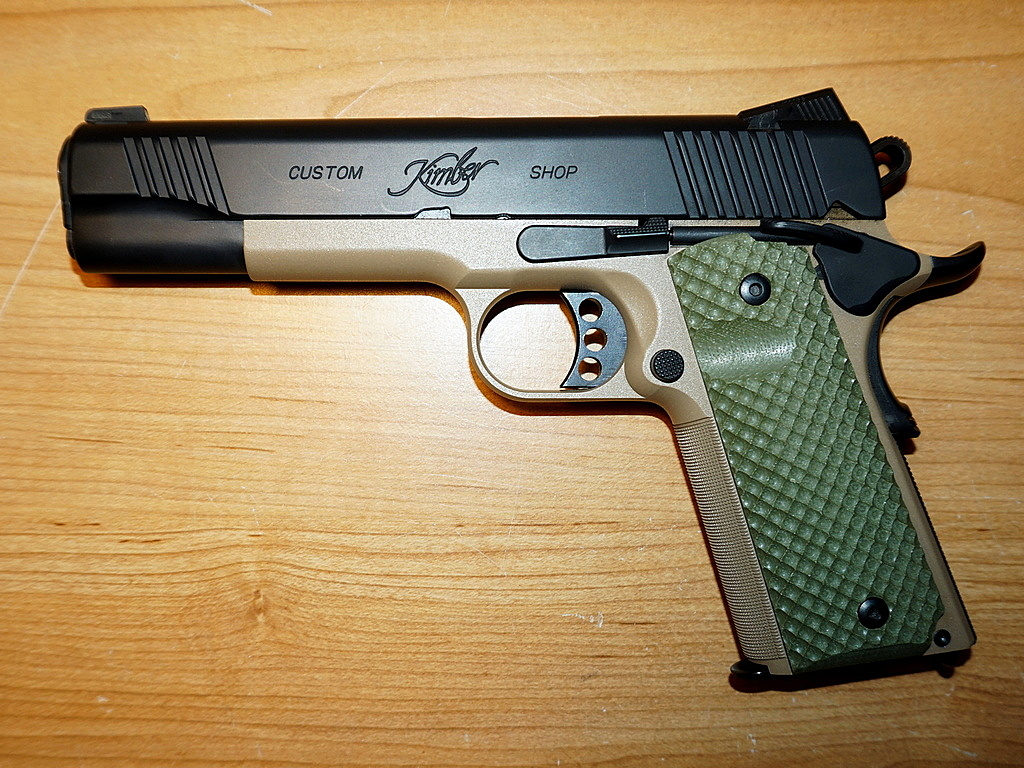
Kimber Custom Shop Covert ll with green G10 grips

== See also ==
- M1911 pistol
- Kimber Eclipse
- Kimber Aegis
- MEU(SOC) pistol
