= Burhan Al-Chalabi =

British-Iraqi writer and publisher

Burhan Al-Chalabi FRSA
- Born: 1 March 1947 (age 79); Mosul, Iraq
- Education: Imperial College London (PhD)
- Occupations: writer, publisher
- Known for: expert on Middle Eastern relations

Burhan Al-Chalabi (born 1 March 1947) is a British-Iraqi writer and political commentator, and an expert on Middle Eastern relations. He is also the publisher of the London Magazine, Britain's oldest journal of the arts and literature (est 1732). Al-Chalabi is the founder and former chairman of the British-Iraqi Foundation, and has been described as one of the most prominent Iraqis living in the UK. He is a Fellow of the Royal Society of Arts, and a member of the Royal Institute of International Affairs. He is also a former academic advisor to the United Arab Emirates.

== Personal life ==
Al-Chalabi was born in 1947 in Mosul, Iraq. In 1965 he was awarded a scholarship by the Iraqi Ministry of Oil to study in the UK. He holds a PhD in Thermal Power from Imperial College London. Al-Chalabi is the owner of BMC Properties, a large London-based property company.

== Work ==
Dr Al-Chalabi holds the role of publisher for The London Magazine. He purchased the historical publication in 2011, after substantial cuts in its Art Council funding threatened its continuation. As a writer and political commentator, Al-Chalabi produces work in both English and Arabic. He has contributed to some of the UK's most influential media outlets, such as The Guardian, and The New Statesman. He has also contributed to several international news outlets, such as Al-Jazeera.

Al-Chalabi is a member of the Chatham House think tank. He is also a member of the Conservative Party research group, the Bow Group, and a member of the Foreign and Commonwealth Council. In 1999, Al-Chalabi became a member of the Conservative Party Premier Club (at the invitation of Rt Hon John Major, Rt Hon Dr Brian Mawhinney, Sir Geoffrey Leigh, and John Beckwith). Al-Chalabi is the founder and former chairman of the British-Iraqi Foundation, and NGO formed with the aim of promoting increasingly close British-Iraqi relations (patrons have included Sir Cyril Townsend, Sir John Moberley, Anthony Harris, and Sabah Al-Mukhtar). He also acted for several years as a named Patron of the Next Century Foundation, and acted as Iraqi Secretariat for the organisation.
