= Simon Kimber =

English cricketer

Personal information
- Full name: Simon Julian Spencer Kimber
- Born: 6 October 1963 (age 63); Ormskirk, Lancashire, England
- Batting: Right-handed
- Bowling: Right-arm medium-fast

Domestic team information
- Years: Team
- 1985: Worcestershire
- 1986/87–1993/94: Natal
- 1987–1989: Sussex

Career statistics
Competition	First-class	List A
Matches	38	27
Runs scored	630	86
Batting average	15.36	10.75
100s/50s	0/1	0/0
Top score	54	15*
Balls bowled	5,416	961
Wickets	93	15
Bowling average	30.68	54.06
5 wickets in innings	1	0
10 wickets in match	0	0
Best bowling	5/63	3/35
Catches/stumpings	18/–	2/–
- Source: CricketArchive, 9 November 2008

Simon Julian Spencer Kimber (born 6 October 1963) is a former English first-class cricketer who played first-class and List A cricket in the 1980s and 1990s.

Born at Ormskirk in Lancashire, Kimber was educated at Thomas More College at Kloof in South Africa before going up to the University of South Africa. After a number of appearances in the Hampshire and Worcestershire second teams, he made his first-class debut against Oxford University at The University Parks in May 1985. In his first game, Kimber scored 14 not out at number ten in his only innings, bowled seven wicketless overs and held one catch. Kimber also appeared against Cambridge University, taking his first three first-class wickets, but that was to be his only other first-team outing for Worcestershire.

Kimber's English appearances in 1986 were confined to a handful of Second XI games with Derbyshire, but that winter he went to South Africa and played a couple of first-class matches for Natal B in the Castle Bowl, claiming six wickets in the match against Eastern Province B.

For 1987 he joined Sussex, with whom he was to remain until 1989. It was during this period that he produced his only first-class half-century: 54 against Nottinghamshire in early August 1987. In the 1987 season he appeared eight times in first-class cricket, his most in a single season, but the only time he was anything like a regular was in the one-day form of the game the following summer, when he made 20 List A appearances. However, in those games he took only 14 wickets and failed entirely with the bat, compiling just 81 runs in his 11 innings.

The rest of Kimber's cricketing career was spent in South Africa, again playing for Natal B and — in 1990-91 — the province's main team. He proved a considerably more successful wicket-taker here than he had been in England, claiming four or more wickets in a first-class innings on five occasions and in January 1992 achieving his only five-wicket innings haul when he took 5-63 for Natal B against Transvaal B. He played his final match in December 1993.
