= Bobbie Kimber =

English ventroloquist and female impersonator

- Born: Ronald Victor Kimberley; 27 May 1920; Edgbaston, Birmingham, England
- Died: 8 April 1993 (aged 72); Hackney, London, England
- Occupation(s): Ventriloquist, female impersonator
- Years active: 1930s–1970s

Bobbie Kimber (born Ronald Victor Kimberley; 27 May 1920 – 8 April 1993) was an English ventriloquist, who performed as a female impersonator.

== Biography ==
Ronald Kimberley was born in Edgbaston, Birmingham, in 1920 according to official records, though some sources incorrectly state 1918. He developed an interest in ventriloquism as a child, and began performing at local social events and dinners. After meeting theatrical agent Bert Hurran, he started working more regularly in local variety shows, and then joined a concert party who performed at Weston-super-Mare. On one occasion, the regular female impersonator was unavailable, and Kimberley was persuaded to take on her role in drag. This event is usually reported as taking place in 1938, though some sources suggest that Bobbie Kimberley appeared there as a female impersonator as early as 1935.

By 1939, Kimberley, performing as Bobbie Kimber, had begun appearing as a female ventriloquist in London theatres, with a dummy called Eddie. There were few female ventriloquists at the time. He broadcast on Radio Luxembourg, and made his first television appearance in 1940. During the Second World War he served in the armed forces, stationed near Folkestone, and was assigned to take part in entertainment shows. When there, he met fellow entertainer Jan Wynne (real name Janette Blatchley); they married in 1941 and had a daughter in 1949.

After the war, Kimber resumed a career touring in theatre shows, and also appeared in the 1947 Royal Variety Performance; according to historian Richard Anthony Baker, this was "the first time a female impersonator had been selected". He appeared as an "ugly sister" in pantomimes, began performing with a new dummy, Augustus Peabody, and started appearing more regularly on BBC television. Kimber's gender was not disclosed publicly by the BBC, or to audiences. In 1952, a front-page report in the Daily Mirror suggested that "Britain’s TV audience was hoaxed into thinking it was watching a woman. But it was not. For Bobbie Kimber is a man...”. In response, Kimber said: "I’ve always been careful to see that the BBC never used any pronouns about me – just Bobbie Kimber, no 'he' or 'she'"; and elsewhere said: "I decided to keep my sex a secret. And I did, very successfully..". Reports generally suggest that most fellow performers were aware of Kimber's gender, though Roy Hudd wrote that "we were all totally shocked when 'she' announced she was actually a man."

After the tabloid press coverage, Kimber appeared rarely on television. He continued to perform in theatres, but by the late 1960s had also taken other jobs such as a pub landlord and lorry driver. He appeared in a drag act festival in 1969, and in 1972 appeared as a female impersonator on Opportunity Knocks. Following that appearance, the Sunday Mirror published a series of reports, including interviews in which Kimber (apparently falsely) said that in 1970 they had had gender reassignment surgery in Morocco. Most reports suggest that, at that time, and for the rest of their life, Kimber always presented in public as a woman, remaining married to Jan, who died in 1985. In retirement, Kimber painted many miniature portraits of earlier entertainers, as well as landscapes.

Bobbie Kimber died in Hackney, London, in 1993.

In 2024, Anthony Slide published the biography, Bobbie Kimber: An Amiable Misfit (BearManor Media).
