= Isaac Kimber =

English General Baptist minister, biographer and journalist

Isaac Kimber (1692–1755) was an English General Baptist minister, biographer, and journalist.

== Life ==
Kimber was born at Wantage, Berkshire, on 1 December 1692. He studied languages under John Ward, and took a course of philosophy and divinity under John Eames. In 1719 he voted with the nonsubscribers at Salters' Hall.

Kimber's first settlement as minister was early in 1722, as assistant to Joseph Burroughs, at Paul's Alley, Barbican; he was an unimpressive preacher, and, very near-sighted, he eventually lost the sight of one eye. He left Paul's Alley on 28 June 1724, and became assistant to Samuel Acton at Nantwich, Cheshire. He left Nantwich in 1727, and became assistant to the General Baptist congregation in Old Artillery Lane, London, and also at a neighbouring congregation. On the amalgamation of the two groups, he left the active ministry.

Kimber then started a periodical called The Morning Chronicle, which lasted from January 1728 to May 1732. In 1734 Ward made over his school near Moorfields to Kimber and Edward Sandercock; but then it declined within a few years, and Kimber took to writing for the booksellers. He edited The London Magazine from 1732 and for the rest of his life, a position taken over by his son Edward. Charles Ackers, a printer and the publisher of the London Magazine, was a major supporter.

Kimber died of apoplexy early in 1755; his funeral sermon was preached at Paul's Alley by Joseph Burroughs on 9 February.

== Works ==
Among Kimber's publications were:

- The Life of Oliver Cromwell, 1724 (six editions); a French translation appeared in 1725.
- An Abridgement of the History of England, 1745.

Posthumous were:

- Twenty Sermons, 1756.
- Sermons, 1758 (with life).

Kimber edited the Works (1729, 2 vols.) of William Beveridge, prefixing a Life; and contributed the account of the reign of George II to the 1740 edition of the Medulla Historiæ Anglicanæ of William Howell. He edited Robert Ainsworth's Latin Dictionary (1751).

At Nantwich Kimber published (1727) a funeral sermon for Mrs. Milton. She has been identified as Elizabeth Minshull, widow of John Milton; but this has also been disputed.

== Family ==
Kimber married, and was father of Edward Kimber. His wife Anna suffered from mental illness, for 23 years. Edward was the second of five sons, of whom the eldest was also called Isaac; the other three died young.

== Notes ==
Attribution

This article incorporates text from a publication now in the public domain: Lee, Sidney, ed. (1892). "Kimber, Isaac". Dictionary of National Biography. Vol. 31. London: Smith, Elder & Co.
