= Edward Kimber =

English novelist, journalist and compiler of reference works

Edward Kimber (1719–1769) was an English novelist, journalist and compiler of reference works.

== Life ==
He was son of Isaac Kimber; and in early life apprentice to a bookseller, John Noon of Cheapside. He made a living by compilation and editorial work for booksellers.

Kimber spent the years 1742 to 1744 in British North America, and drew on his travels in subsequent writing. In 1745–6 he published a series of Itinerant Observations in America in The London Magazine, at that point edited by his father.

== Works ==
Kimber wrote:

- A Relation, or Journal, of a Late Expedition to the Gates of St. Augustine, on Florida (1744). Kimber had served in the militia of James Oglethorpe, and participated in a raid in 1743 that was a sequel to the 1740 siege of St. Augustine, Florida.
- The Life and Adventures of Joe Thompson, a Narrative founded on fact, written by himself [anon.], 2 vols., London, 1750; other editions, 1751, 1775, 1783. A French translation appeared in 1762. A "ramble novel", it sold well at the time, and was then condemned to neglect.
- The History of the Life and Adventures of Mr. Anderson (1754). A sentimental novel, it was based on a real-life narrative Kimber had heard in Georgia. Kimber denounced slavery, but is now found to be equivocal on the related issue, in the American context, of white supremacy.
- The Life and Adventures of James Ramble (1754)
- The Juvenile Adventures of David Ranger (1756)
- The Life, Extraordinary Adventures, Voyages, and Surprizing Escapes of Capt. Neville Frowde, of Cork (1758)
- The Happy Orphans (1759), translation from the French. The French original of 1754 was itself imitated from the Fortunate Foundlings of Eliza Haywood.
- Maria: The Genuine Memoirs of an Admired Lady of Rank and Fortune (1764)
- The Generous Briton: or, the Authentic Memoirs of William Goldsmith (1765)
- The Peerage of England, London, 1766; 2nd edit. 1769.
- The Peerage of Scotland, London, 1767.
- The Peerage of Ireland, London, 1768.
- The Extinct Peerage of England, London, 1769.

He also wrote memoirs of his father, together with a poem to his memory, prefixed to Isaac Kimber's Sermons, 1756. With Richard Johnson he edited and continued Thomas Wooton's Baronetage of England, 3 vols., London, 1771.

== Notes ==
Attribution

This article incorporates text from a publication now in the public domain: Lee, Sidney, ed. (1892). "Kimber, Edward". Dictionary of National Biography. Vol. 31. London: Smith, Elder & Co.
