= Kimber Aegis =

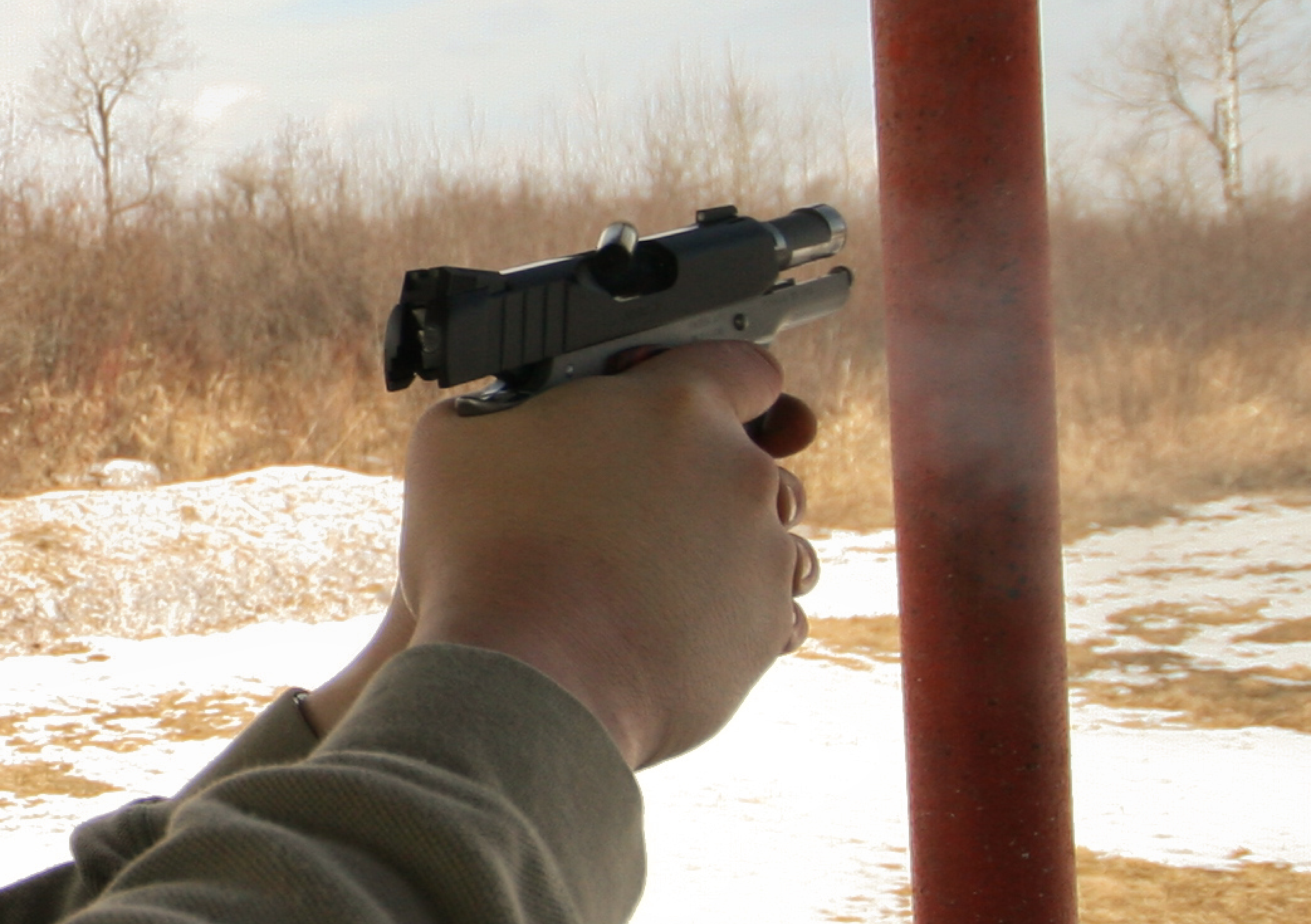
- Kimber Pro Aegis II
- Type: Semi-automatic pistol
- Place of origin: United States

Production history
- Manufacturer: Kimber
- Variants: Custom Aegis II; Pro Aegis II; Ultra Aegis II

Specifications
- Caliber: 9×19mm Parabellum.45 ACP
- Action: Semi-automatic, single-action
- Feed system: 8-round magazines

The Kimber Aegis is a series of M1911 pistols chambered in 9mm Luger as well as .45 ACP and is manufactured by Kimber Manufacturing.

== Features ==
The Aegis has an aluminum frame, a black steel slide with a flat top, fluted rosewood grips or crimson trace laser grips, and tritium night sights.

The Aegis has several features designed to enhance its use for concealed carry. The aluminum frame reduces the weight of the gun.

The grips are thin, slightly decreasing the width of the pistol, and the butt is rounded. To minimize snagging, the hammer does not have a spur, and the thumb safety and magazine release have a reduced profile.

Additionally, the edges of the gun are rounded with a "carry melt" treatment.

== Variants ==
The series include the subcompact Ultra Aegis II, the compact Pro Aegis II, and the full-sized Custom Aegis II.
