= SIG Sauer P938 =

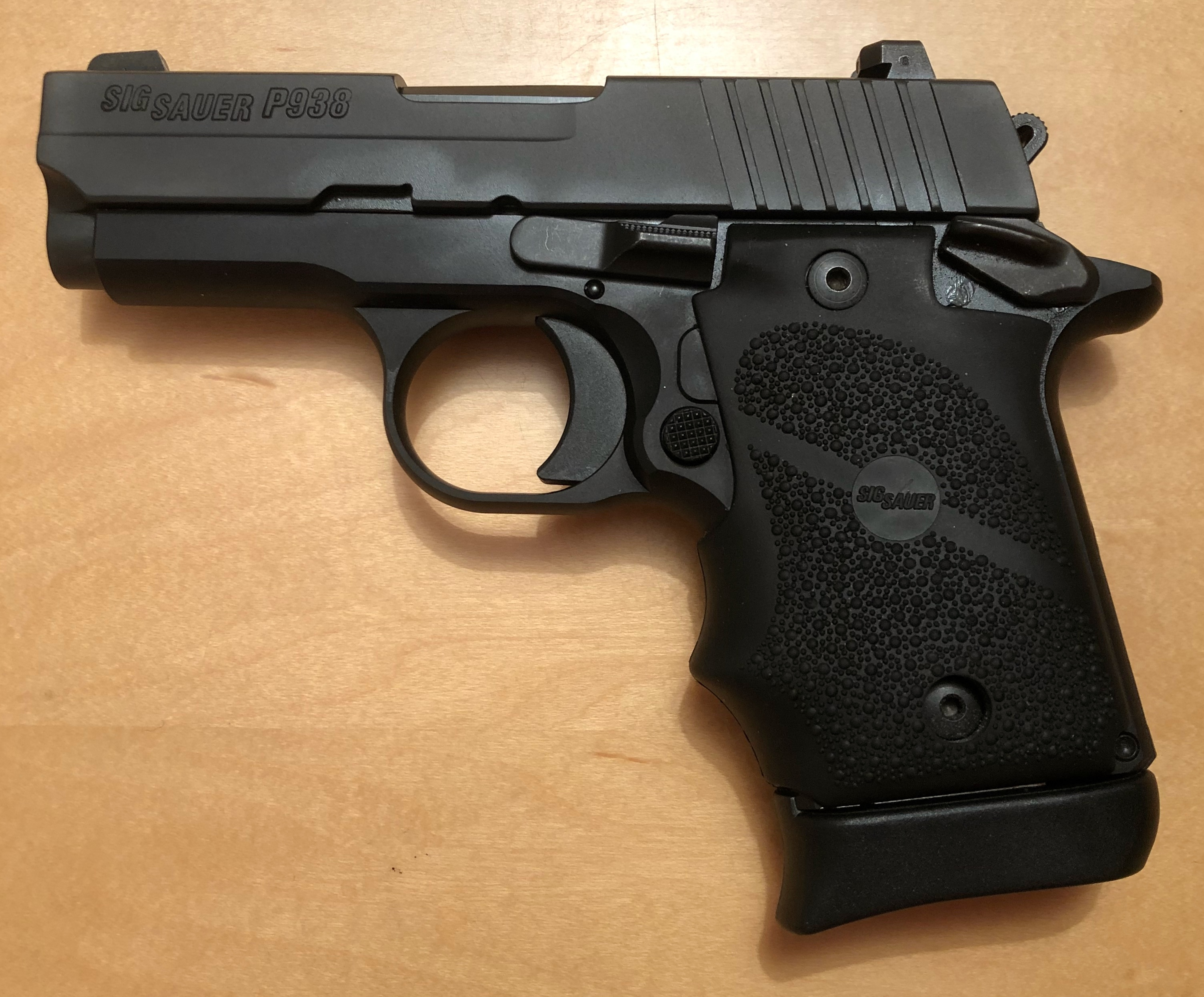
- A P938 with extended (seven-round) magazine
- Type: Pistol
- Place of origin: United States; Switzerland

Production history
- Manufacturer: SIG Sauer
- Produced: 2011–present
- Variants: P938-22

Specifications
- Mass: 16 oz (450 g)
- Length: 5.9 in (150 mm)
- Barrel length: 3.0 in (76 mm)
- Width: 1.1 in (28 mm)
- Height: 3.9 in (99 mm)
- Cartridge: 9×19mm Parabellum (P938).22 Long Rifle (P938-22)
- Action: Single action
- Rate of fire: Semi-Automatic
- Feed system: Box magazines: 6-round, 7-round, 10-round (P938-22)
- Sights: SIGLITE Night Sights

The SIG Sauer P938 is a micro-compact single-action pistol chambered for the 9×19mm Parabellum cartridge, manufactured by SIG Sauer and introduced at the 2011 SHOT Show.

== Design ==
The P938, chambered for 9×19mm Parabellum, is a slightly larger version of the SIG Sauer P238 pistol, which is chambered for .380 ACP.

Trigger pull for the P938 is listed at 7.5–8.5 lb_{f} (33–38 N). A finger relief exists under the trigger guard. Grip panels are one of three kinds of wood, Hogue G-10 Extreme composite, or rubber wrap-around in the "Sport" model.

The frame is metal, unlike many other micro-compact 9 mm handguns.

The frame for all P938 models is anodized aluminum alloy, and the slide is stainless steel either bare or with SIG's Nitron coating.

Flush-fit magazines hold 6 rounds, while 7-round magazines with an extension are available. The safety is ambidextrous, while the magazine release is only on the left side.

Specialty versions have been made such as the Scorpion, Nightmare, Extreme, Equinox, AG (aluminum grip), and SAS (SIG Anti-Snag) as well as for the Legion series.

== Variant ==
=== P938-22 ===
The P938-22 variant is chambered for .22 Long Rifle and features a 10-round magazine, alloy slide, and black hard coat finish.

The P938-22 is offered in Standard and Target packages. Barrels on the P938-22 are longer than on the P938.

Specification	P938	P938-22	
Specification	P938	Standard	Target
Barrel Length	3.0 inches (76 mm)	3.3 inches (84 mm)	4.1 inches (100 mm)
Overall Length	5.9 inches (150 mm)	6.2 inches (160 mm)	7 inches (180 mm)
Overall Width	1.1 inches (28 mm)	1.1 inches (28 mm)	1.1 inches (28 mm)
Height	3.9 inches (99 mm)	3.9 inches (99 mm)	3.9 inches (99 mm)
Weight	16.0 oz (450 g)	15.3 ounces (430 g)	16.2 ounces (460 g)
