= Kimber Manufacturing =

American firearms manufacturer

Kimber Manufacturing, Inc.
- Type: Private
- Industry: Defense
- Founded: 1979; 47 years ago
- Headquarters: Troy, Alabama
- Key people: Leslie Edelman, President and owner
- Products: Firearms, Knives, Weapons, Accessories
- Number of employees: 400+ (2011)
- Website: www.kimberamerica.com

Kimber Manufacturing is an American company that designs, manufactures, and distributes small arms such as M1911 pistols, Solo pistols, rifles, and revolvers. The USA Shooting Team, Marines assigned to Special Operations Command, and the LAPD SWAT team have used Kimber pistols in the past.

== History ==
Kimber was founded as "Kimber of Oregon" in 1979 by Jack Warne and his son Greg Warne in the small town of Clackamas, Oregon. An Australian, Jack Warne founded the Australian firearms manufacturer, Sporting Arms or Sportco, in Adelaide, South Australia, following World War II.

Following its founding, Kimber of Oregon quickly built a reputation for accurate .22 long rifle caliber rifles. Subsequently, it began to expand its product line and eventually acquired a second manufacturing plant in nearby Colton. Jack Warne acquired the Brownell quick-detachable rifle scope mounting system for Kimber.

In the late 1980s, the company began to struggle after a private stock offering fell short of covering the costs of developing the M89 BG (Big Game) Rifle. In 1989, Kimber of Oregon was sold to Oregon timber baron Bruce Engel, who founded WTD Industries, Inc. Engel had difficulty running Kimber and soon the company sought bankruptcy protection.

In 1990, several Kimber employees, including Dan Cooper, left to found Cooper Firearms of Montana. Jack Warne left to open the Warne Manufacturing Company in February 1991, which began manufacture of a new rifle scope mounting system.

In the mid-1990s, Greg Warne tried to revive Kimber, but much of Kimber of Oregon's original tooling had ended up in a junkyard north of Portland. Warne soon found a financial backer in Les Edelman, who owned Nationwide Sports Distributors. The two purchased the original tooling and partnered to found Kimber of America. The company grew quickly, but Edelman forced Greg Warne out after acquiring a majority interest in the company.

While Edelman was partnering with Greg Warne, he had also invested in Yonkers-based Jerico Precision Manufacturing, which manufactured hand tools and mechanical components for the defense industry, which was adjusting to cuts in defense spending. Edelman decided to connect Jerico Precision's existing infrastructure and manufacturing capabilities and Kimber's reputation and extensive network of dealers to build a line of M1911-style handguns. He eventually moved Kimber's production line to Jerico's facilities in New York, ending Kimber's presence in Oregon. The company now has locations in New York and New Jersey.

On 9 December 2004, a federal grand jury indicted former CFO Denis Shusterman for embezzling $10 million from Kimber Manufacturing and Nationwide Sports Distributors. He was later convicted after pleading guilty, ordered to pay damages and back taxes, and sentenced to 14 years in federal prison.

After leaving Kimber, Greg Warne operated Armas Deportivas S.A. in Granadilla, San Pedro, Costa Rica, where he made custom gun grips from locally sourced hardwoods. Greg Warne died in 2006.

Kimber is planning to expand manufacturing capacity from its 31,500-square-foot (2,930 m^{2}) manufacturing facility in Ridgefield, New Jersey (Aero Molding). A proposal to add more space to its Yonkers site had been approved as a "regionally significant project" but Kimber appears to have withdrawn its application following concerns raised by worried neighbors.

Faced with political opposition in New York and New Jersey, Kimber explored other locations for their operations. The company announced intention to open a manufacturing facility in Troy, Alabama, in January 2018 On October 21, 2020, Kimber Arms management announced the corporate headquarters is being relocated to Troy.

== Products ==
=== Pistols ===
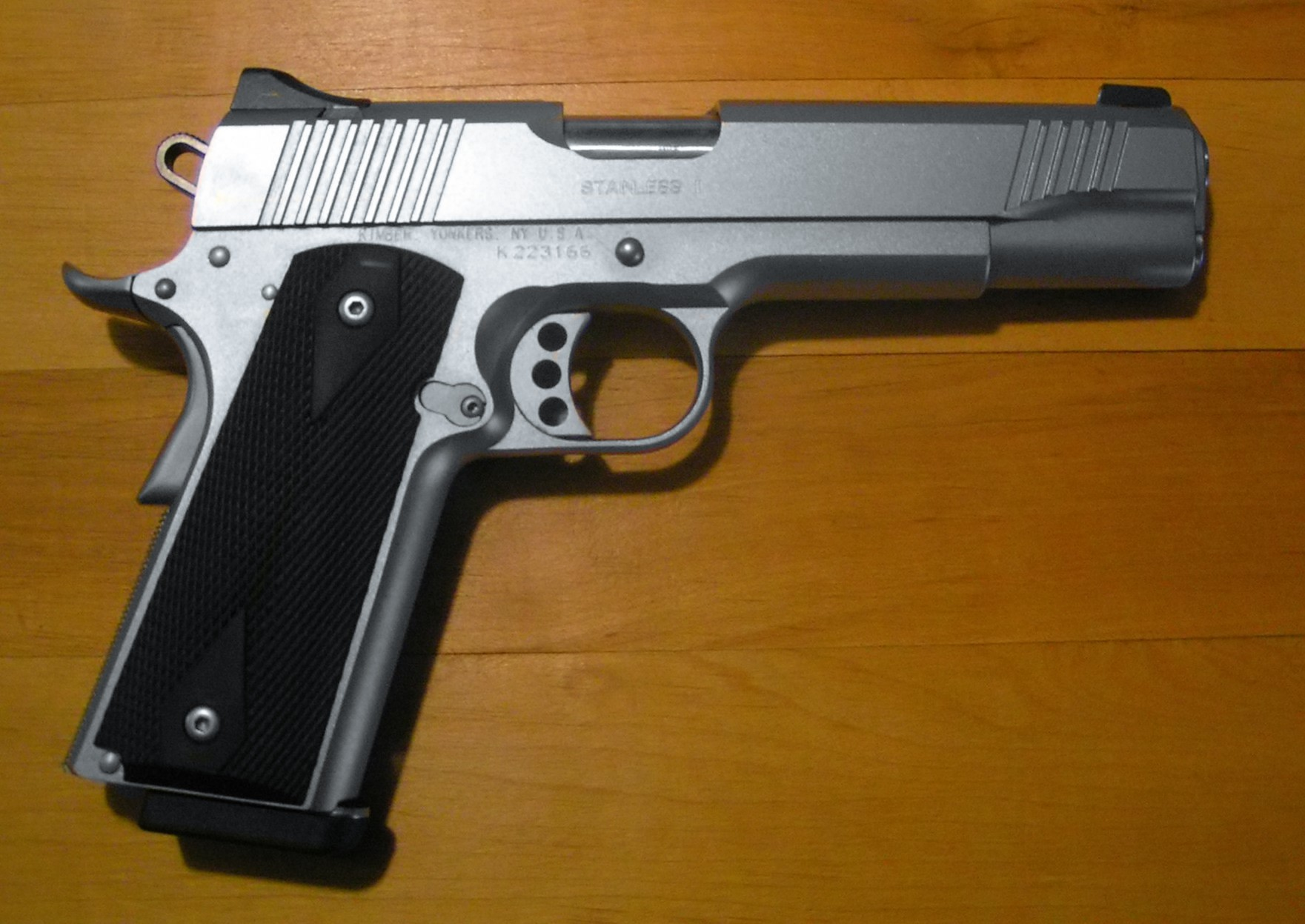
Kimber Custom Stainless II pistol in .45 ACP

Kimber makes M1911-style pistols with a variety of customization options. Early on, the company introduced the use of metal injection molding for some parts, such as the thumb safety, which makes them more cost-effective to produce.

Models available include:

- Kimber Custom series
- Kimber Micro series
- Kimber Aegis series

=== Revolvers ===
Kimber manufactures two models of revolvers, the K6S in either Double Action/Single Action or Double Action Only configuration chambered in .357 Magnum, and the K6xs, chambered in .38 special +P. Both revolvers have a capacity of six rounds. The K6S models are available in 2"-inch, 3" inch, and 4"-inch barrels.

=== Rifles ===
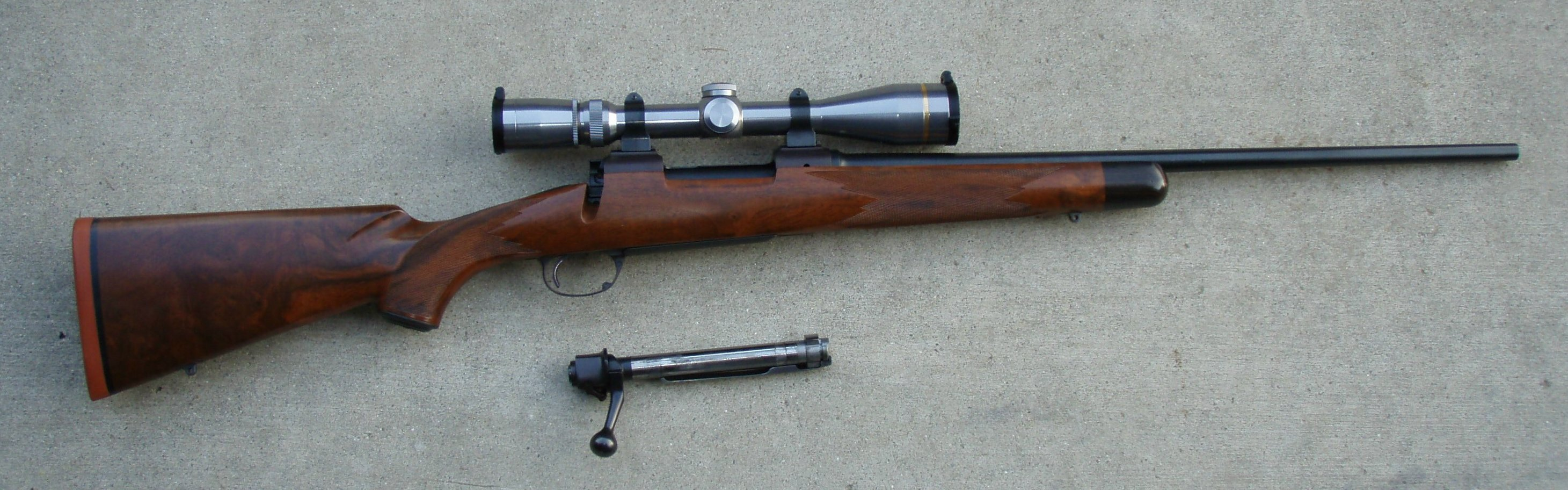
Kimber of Oregon Super Custom rifle in .270 Winchester

Kimber also makes several long gun models, including hunting and tactical rifles. Most of these rifles utilize a Mauser-type controlled feed action, originally designed by Nehemia Sirkis. Kimber rifles have a reputation for accuracy and quality.

== Kimber firearms in use ==
A modified version of the "Team Match II" .45 ACP caliber pistol is used by the US Shooting Rapid Fire Pistol Team. In 2002, the LAPD chose a slightly modified and specially marked (marked in "LAPD SWAT CUSTOM II") version of the Custom TLE II as the standard issue for its SWAT unit. Several other law enforcement agencies have approved Kimber firearms for on-duty carry by their patrol and SWAT officers. In 2007 a new pistol designed by the LAPD Special Investigation Section was added to the Kimber's line of M1911-pattern pistols. A modified Kimber 1911 was also chosen as the sidearm for Marine Corps forces assigned to Special Operations Command.

== Political activities ==
Kimber Manufacturing donated $200,000 to the Red White and Blue Fund, a super PAC that supported Rick Santorum in 2012. Kimber was the first gun company to donate to a super PAC.

== See also ==
- List of modern armament manufacturers
