= SIG Sauer P238 =

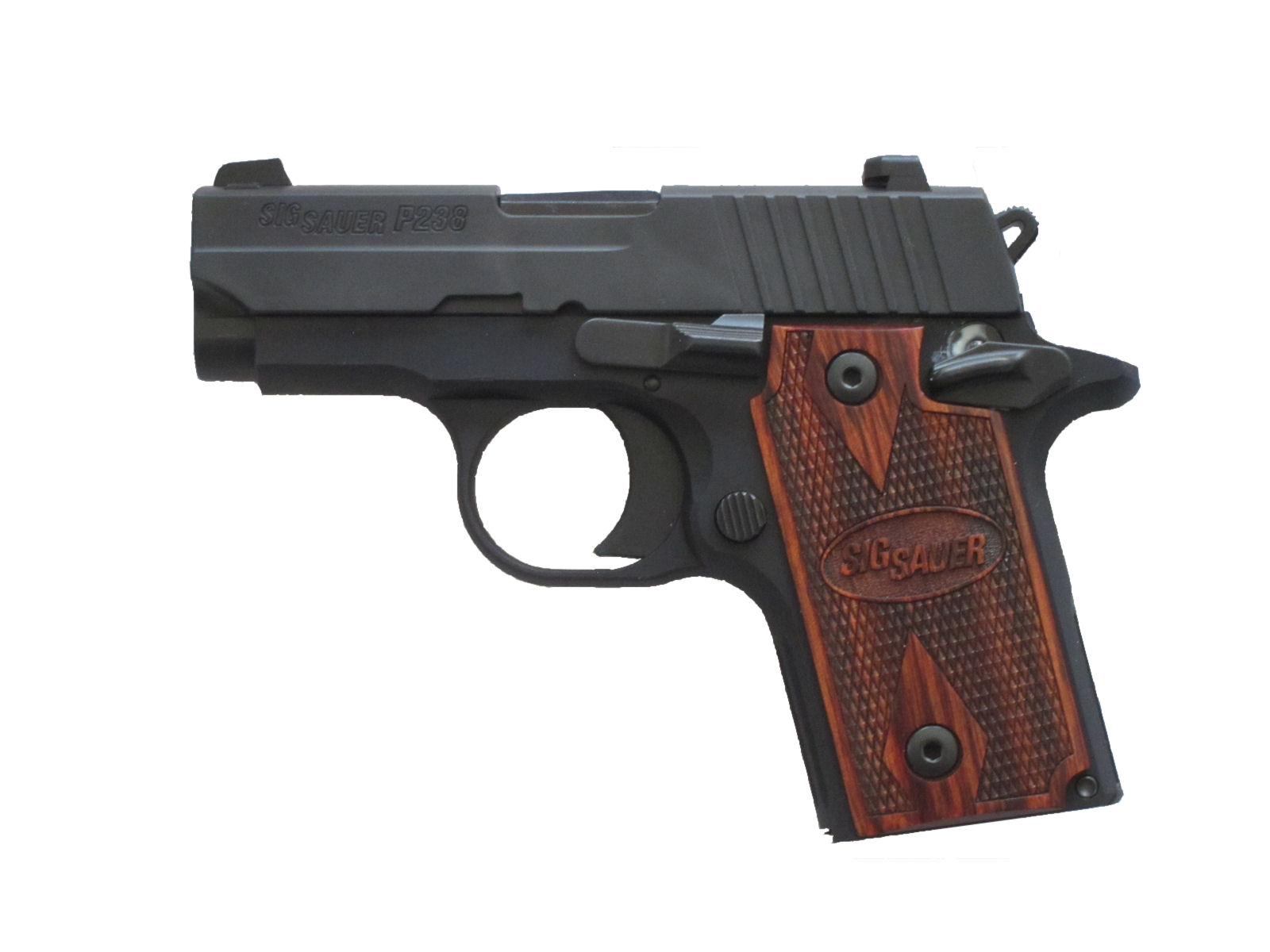
- P238 pistol manufactured by SIG Sauer, Rosewood variant
- Type: Pistol
- Place of origin: United States; Switzerland

Production history
- Manufacturer: SIG Sauer
- Unit cost: MSRP $679.00
- Produced: 2009–present

Specifications
- Mass: 15.2 oz (430 g)
- Length: 5.5 in (140 mm)
- Barrel length: 2.7 in (69 mm)
- Width: 1.1 in (28 mm)
- Height: 3.9 in (99 mm)
- Cartridge: .380 ACP
- Feed system: 6- or 7-round single-column detachable box magazine
- Sights: 3 dot white or tritium night sights, or Tru-Glo Fiberoptic (all model specific)

The SIG Sauer P238 is a compact .380 ACP caliber, single-action pistol announced by SIG Sauer at the 2009 SHOT Show.

== Design ==
It is modelled after the M1911, similar to the Colt Mustang.

Grip panels are fluted polymer making this an all-metal frame firearm in competition with plastic-framed pistols in the same class as the Ruger LCP and the Kel-Tec P-3AT.

The P238 has an aluminium frame and a stainless steel slide (with the exception of the HD model which is all stainless steel).

Initially, P238 pistols had standard sights with night sights as a more expensive option. However, all models currently produced have night sights standard.

Starting in 2012, many variants have an ambidextrous thumb safety standard or as an option.

== Variants ==
When introduced in 2009, the P238 was available in a matte black finish and a two-tone finish with a matte silver colored slide and black frame.

Since then, SIG Sauer has produced a number of variants including some short run commemorative editions.

Among the variants are versions with various finishes, with a stainless steel frame and different grips and embellishments.

The SIG Sauer P938, chambered in 9×19mm Parabellum and introduced at the 2011 SHOT Show, is a slightly larger version of the P238.

== Recall ==
In July 2009, SIG Sauer issued a recall of all P238s sold within a certain serial number range, which they referred to as a "Mandatory Safety Upgrade".

The reason stated for the recall was that a small number of P238s were built with defective manual safety levers, leading to "the remote possibility that the gun could fire unintentionally, thus creating a risk of injury or death", although SIG Sauer emphasized that no such injuries had actually occurred.

The recall only applied to pistols within a specific range of serial numbers, DA000501 to DA003216, and did not affect any 27Axxxxxx serialized pistols.
