= Anthony Award for Best First Novel =

Annual literary award

- Awarded for: Debut mystery novel
- Presented by: Bouchercon World Mystery Convention
- First award: 1986
- Website: bouchercon.com

The Anthony Award for Best First Novel, established in 1986, is an annual award presented as part of the Anthony Awards on behalf of Mystery Writers of America.

== Recipients ==
Award winners and finalists
Year	Author	Title	Result	Ref.
1986	Jonathan Kellerman	When the Bough Breaks	Winner	
1986	Susan Kelly	The Gemini Man	Finalist	
1986	Dick Lochte	Sleeping Dog	Finalist	
1986	Robert Reeves	Doubting Thomas	Finalist	
1986	Andrew Vachss	Flood	Finalist	
1987	Bill Crider	Too Late To Die	Winner	
1987	Joan Hess	Strangled Prose	Finalist	
1987	Faye Kellerman	The Ritual Bath	Finalist	
1987	Joseph Koenig	Floater	Finalist	
1987	Mike Lupica	Dead Air	Finalist	
1988	Gillian Roberts	Caught Dead in Philadelphia	Winner	
1988	Michael Allegretto	Death on the Rocks	Finalist	
1988	Robert Bowman	The House of Blue Lights	Finalist	
1988	Mary Monica Pulver	Murder at the War	Finalist	
1988	Les Roberts	An Infinite Number of Monkeys	Finalist	
1989	Elizabeth George	A Great Deliverance	Winner	
1989	Mary Lou Bennett	Murder Once Done	Finalist	
1989	Caroline Graham	The Killings at Badger's Drift	Finalist	
1989	Linda Grant	Random Access Murder	Finalist	
1989	Gar Anthony Haywood	Fear of the Dark	Finalist	
1989	David Stout	Carolina Skeletons	Finalist	
1990	Karen Kijewski	Katwalk	Winner	
1990	Jill Churchill	Grime & Punishment	Finalist	
1990	Melodie Johnson Howe	The Mother Shadow	Finalist	
1990	Edith Skom	The Mark Twain Murders	Finalist	
1990	Susan Wolfe	The Last Billable Hour	Finalist	
1991	Patricia Cornwell	Postmortem	Winner	
1991	Janet Dawson	Kindred Crimes	Finalist	
1991	Diane Mott Davidson	Catering to Nobody	Finalist	
1991	Rochelle Krich	Where’s Mommy Now?	Finalist	
1991	James McCahery	Grave Undertaking	Finalist	
1992	Sue Henry	Murder on the Iditarod Trail	Winner	
1992	Mary Cahill	Carpool	Finalist	
1992	Margaret Lucke	A Relative Stranger	Finalist	
1992	Rebecca Rothenberg	The Bulrush Murders	Finalist	
1992	Leslie Elizabeth Watts	The Chocolate Box	Finalist	
1992	Gloria White	Murder on the Run	Finalist	
1993	Barbara Neely	Blanche on the Lam	Winner	
1993	Susan Wittig Albert	Thyme of Death	Finalist	
1993	Carol Higgins Clark	Decked	Finalist	
1993	Michael Connelly	The Black Echo	Finalist	
1993	Charlene Weir	The Winter Widow	Finalist	
1994	Nevada Barr	Track of the Cat	Winner	
1994	Jan Burke	Goodnight, Irene	Finalist	
1994	Laurie R. King	A Grave Talent	Finalist	
1994	Sharan Newman	Death Comes as Epiphany	Finalist	
1994	Abigail Padgett	Child of Silence	Finalist	
1995	Caleb Carr	The Alienist	Winner	
1995	David Guterson	Snow Falling on Cedars	Finalist	
1995	Alex Keegan	Cuckoo	Finalist	
1995	Dennis Lehane	A Drink Before the War	Finalist	
1995	Carol O'Connell	Mallory’s Oracle	Finalist	
1995	Laura Joh Rowland	Shinjū	Finalist	
1995	Michelle Spring	Every Breath You Take	Finalist	
1995	Doug J. Swanson	Big Town	Finalist	
1995	Christopher West	Death of a Blue Lantern	Finalist	
1996	Virginia Lanier	Death in Bloodhound Red	Winner	
1996	Richard Barre	The Innocents	Finalist	
1996	G.M. Ford	Who in Hell Is Wanda Fuca?	Finalist	
1996	Charles Kenney	Hammurabi’s Code	Finalist	
1996	Martha C. Lawrence	Murder in Scorpio	Finalist	
1997	Dale Furutani	Death in Little Tokyo	Winner	
1997	Terris McMahan Grimes	Somebody Else’s Child	Winner	
1997	Michael McGarrity	Tularosa	Finalist	
1997	Charles Todd	A Test of Wills	Finalist	
1997	Michael C. White	A Brother’s Blood	Finalist	
1998	Lee Child	Killing Floor	Winner	
1998	Grace Edwards	If I Should Die	Finalist	
1998	Maureen Jennings	Except the Dying	Finalist	
1998	Philip Reed	Bird Dog	Finalist	
1998	Robert E. Skinner	Skin Deep, Blood Red	Finalist	
1999	William Kent Krueger	Iron Lake	Winner	
1999	Jerrilyn Farmer	Sympathy for the Devil	Finalist	
1999	Jacqueline Fielder	Tiger’s Palette	Finalist	
1999	Steve Hamilton	A Cold Day in Paradise	Finalist	
1999	Donald Harstad	Eleven Days	Finalist	
2000	Donna Andrews	Murder With Peacocks	Winner	
2000	Cara Black	Murder in the Marais	Finalist	
2000	April Henry	Circles of Confusion	Finalist	
2000	Kris Neri	Revenge of the Gypsy Queen	Finalist	
2000	Paula L. Woods	Inner City Blues	Finalist	
2001	Qiu Xiaolong	Death of a Red Heroine	Winner	
2001	Stephen Booth	Black Dog	Finalist	
2001	David Liss	A Conspiracy of Paper	Finalist	
2001	Scott Phillips	The Ice Harvest	Finalist	
2001	Bob Truluck	Street Level	Finalist	
2001	Douglas E. Winter	Run	Finalist	
2002	C.J. Box	Open Season	Winner	
2002	K. J. Erikson	Third Person Singular	Finalist	
2002	Jan Grape	Austin City Blue	Finalist	
2002	Denise Hamilton	The Jasmine Trade	Finalist	
2002	Andy Straka	A Witness Above	Finalist	
2003	Julia Spencer-Fleming	In the Bleak Midwinter	Winner	
2003	David Corbett	The Devil’s Redhead	Finalist	
2003	Libby Fischer Hellmann	An Eye for Murder	Finalist	
2003	Jonathon King	The Blue Edge of Midnight	Finalist	
2003	Eddie Muller	The Distance	Finalist	
2004	P. J. Tracy	Monkeewrench	Winner	
2004	Erin Hart	Haunted Ground	Finalist	
2004	Rebecca Pawel	Death of a Nationalist	Finalist	
2004	Lono Waiwaiole	Wiley’s Lament	Finalist	
2004	Jacqueline Winspear	Maisie Dobbs	Finalist	
2005	Harley Jane Kozak	Dating Dead Men	Winner	
2005	Sandra Balzo	Uncommon Grounds	Finalist	
2005	Judy Clemens	Till the Cows Come Home	Finalist	
2005	Jilliane Hoffman	Retribution	Finalist	
2005	J. A. Konrath	Whiskey Sour	Finalist	
2006	Chris Grabenstein	Tilt-a-Whirl	Winner	
2006	Megan Abbott	Die a Little	Finalist	
2006	Brian Freeman	Immoral	Finalist	
2006	Randall Hicks	The Baby Game	Finalist	
2006	Theresa Schwegel	Officer Down	Finalist	
2007	Louise Penny	Still Life	Winner	
2007	John Hart	King of Lies	Finalist	
2007	Steve Hockensmith	Holmes on the Range	Finalist	
2007	Cornelia Read	A Field of Darkness	Finalist	
2007	Alexandra Sokoloff	The Harrowing	Finalist	
2008	Tana French	In the Woods	Winner	
2008	Sean Chercover	Big City, Bad Blood	Finalist	
2008	Lisa Lutz	The Spellman Files	Finalist	
2008	Craig McDonald	Head Games	Finalist	
2008	Marcus Sakey	The Blade Itself	Finalist	
2009	Stieg Larsson	The Girl with the Dragon Tattoo	Winner	
2009	Rosemary Harris	Pushing Up Daisies	Finalist	
2009	Julie Kramer	Stalking Susan	Finalist	
2009	G. M. Malliet	Death of a Cozy Writer	Finalist	
2009	Tom Rob Smith	Child 44	Finalist	
2010	Sophie Littlefield	A Bad Day for Sorry	Winner	
2010	Alan Bradley	The Sweetness at the Bottom of the Pie	Finalist	
2010	Bryan Gruley	Starvation Lake	Finalist	
2010	Stuart Neville	The Ghosts of Belfast	Finalist	
2010	Stefanie Pintoff	In the Shadow of Gotham	Finalist	
2011	Hilary Davidson	The Damage Done	Winner	
2011	Bruce DeSilva	Rogue Island	Finalist	
2011	Paul Doiron	The Poacher’s Son	Finalist	
2011	Graham Moore	The Sherlockian	Finalist	
2011	James Thompson	Snow Angels	Finalist	
2012	Sara J. Henry	Learning To Swim	Winner	
2012	Darrell James	Nazareth Child	Finalist	
2012	Leonard Rosen	All Cry Chaos	Finalist	
2012	Rochelle Staab	Who Do, Voodoo?	Finalist	
2012	Taylor Stevens	The Informationist	Finalist	
2012	Steve Ulfelder	Purgatory Chasm	Finalist	
2012	S. J. Watson	Before I Go To Sleep	Finalist	
2013	Chris Pavone	The Expats	Winner	
2013	Daniel Friedman	Don’t Ever Get Old	Finalist	
2013	Owen Laukkanen	The Professionals	Finalist	
2013	Matthew Quirk	The 500	Finalist	
2013	Michael Sears	Black Fridays	Finalist	
2014	Matt Coyle	Yesterday’s Echo	Winner	
2014	Roger Hobbs	Ghostman	Finalist	
2014	Becky Masterman	Rage Against the Dying	Finalist	
2014	Kimberly McCreight	Reconstructing Amelia	Finalist	
2014	Todd Robinson	The Hard Bounce	Finalist	
2015	Lori Rader-Day	The Black Hour	Winner	
2015	Kristi Belcamino	Blessed Are the Dead	Finalist	
2015	M. P. Cooley	Ice Shear	Finalist	
2015	Julia Dahl	Invisible City	Finalist	
2015	Allen Eskens	The Life We Bury	Finalist	
2016	Glen Erik Hamilton	Past Crimes	Winner	
2016	Patricia Abbott	Concrete Angel	Finalist	
2016	Rob Hart	New Yorked	Finalist	
2016	Art Taylor	On the Road with Del & Louise	Finalist	
2016	Brian Panowich	Bull Mountain	Finalist	
2017	Joe Ide	IQ	Winner	
2017	Bill Beverly	Dodgers	Finalist	
2017	Nadine Nettmann	Decanting a Murder	Finalist	
2017	Renee Patrick	Design for Dying	Finalist	
2017	Nicholas Petrie	The Drifter	Finalist	
2018	Kellye Garrett	Hollywood Homicide	Winner	
2018	Jane Harper	The Dry	Finalist	
2018	Jordan Harper	She Rides Shotgun	Finalist	
2018	Christopher Irvin	Ragged; or, The Loveliest Lies of All	Finalist	
2018	Kristen Lepionka	The Last Place You Look	Finalist	
2019	Oyinkan Braithwaite	My Sister, the Serial Killer	Winner	
2019	Tracy Clark	Broken Places	Finalist	
2019	John Copenhaver	Dodging and Burning	Finalist	
2019	Aimee Hix	What Doesn’t Kill You	Finalist	
2019	James A. McLaughlin	Bearskin	Finalist	
2020	Tara Laskowski	One Night Gone	Winner	
2020	Tori Eldridge	The Ninja Daughter	Finalist	
2020	Angie Kim	Miracle Creek	Finalist	
2020	John Vercher	Three-Fifths	Finalist	
2020	Lauren Wilkinson	American Spy	Finalist	
2021	David Heska Wanbli Weiden	Winter Counts	Winner	
2021	Mary Keliikoa	Derailed	Finalist	
2021	Nev March	Murder in Old Bombay	Finalist	
2021	Erica Ruth Neubauer	Murder at the Mena House	Finalist	
2021	Richard Osman	The Thursday Murder Club	Finalist	
2022	Mia P. Manansala	Arsenic and Adobo	Winner	
2022	Yasmin Angoe	Her Name Is Knight	Finalist	
2022	Zakiya Dalila Harris	The Other Black Girl	Finalist	
2022	Heather Levy	Walking Through Needles	Finalist	
2022	Wanda M. Morris	All Her Little Secrets	Finalist	
2023	Nita Prose	The Maid	Winner	
2023	Eli Cranor	Don’t Know Tough	Finalist	
2023	Ramona Emerson	Shutter	Finalist	
2023	Harini Nagendra	The Bangalore Detectives Club	Finalist	
2023	Rob Osler	Devil’s Chew Toy	Finalist	
2024	Nina Simon	Mother-Daughter Murder Night	Winner	
2024	I. S. Berry	The Peacock and the Sparrow	Finalist	
2024	Lina Chern	Play the Fool	Finalist	
2024	Margo Douaihy	Scotched Grace	Finalist	
2024	Iris Yamashita	City Under One Roof	Finalist	
2025	K. T. Nguyen	You Know What You Did	Winner	
2025	Audrey Lee	The Mechanics of Memory	Finalist	
2025	Jennifer K. Morita	Ghosts of Waikiki	Finalist	
2025	Rob D. Smith	Good Looking Ugly	Finalist	
2025	Henry Wise	Holy City	Finalist	
