= Gumshoe Awards =

American award for crime fiction

- Awarded for: Books
- Date: 2002 – 2008
- Country: United States

The Gumshoe Awards were an American award for popular crime fiction literary works. The Gumshoe Awards were awarded annually by the American Internet magazine Mystery Ink (not to be confused with Mystery Inc.) to recognize the best achievements in crime fiction. The nominated books were chosen from those published for the first time in the United States in English (or English translation). They were awarded in several categories:

- Best Mystery
- Best Thriller
- Best First Novel
- Best Crime Fiction Website
- Lifetime Achievement Award

In 2005 a new award category was introduced: Best European Crime Novel.

== Categories ==
Category	Initially awarded	Notes
Best Mystery	2002	In 2002/3 this was titled "Best Novel"
Best Thriller	2005	
Best European Crime Novel	2005	
Best First Novel	2002	
Lifetime Achievement	2002	
Best Crime Fiction Website	2002	2002/3: "Best Author Website"

== Prize winners by category ==
=== Best Mystery (2002/3: "Best Novel") ===
Year	Prize winner	Title	Publisher
2002	Thomas Perry	Pursuit	Random House, New York 2001
2003	George P. Pelecanos	Hell to Pay	Little, Brown & Co., Boston 2002
2004	Steve Hamilton	Blood is the Sky	Thomas Dunne Books, New York 2003
2005	Jim Fusilli	Hard, Hard City	Putnam's, New York 2004
2006	Laura Lippman	To the Power of the Three	William Morrow, New York 2005
2007	Julia Spencer-Fleming	All Mortal Flesh	Thomas Dunne Books, New York 2006
2008	James Lee Burke	The Tin Roof Blowdown	Simon & Schuster, New York 2007

=== Best Thriller ===
Year	Prize Winner	Title	Publisher
2005	Barry Eisler	Rain Storm	Putnam's, New York 2004
2006	Joseph Finder	Company Man	St. Martin's Press, New York 2005
2007	Robert Ferrigno	Prayers for the Assassin	Scribner, New York 2006
2008	Robert Crais	The Watchman	Simon & Schuster, New York 2007

=== Best European Crime Novel ===
Not awarded: 2008

Year	Prize Winner	Nationality	Title	Publisher
2005	Henning Mankell	Swedish	The Return of the Dancing Master	The New Press, New York 2003
2006	Robert Wilson	British	The Vanished Hands	Harcourt, New York 2006
2007	Karin Fossum	Norwegian	When the Devil Holds the Candle	Harcourt, New York 2006

=== Best First Novel ===
Year	Prize Winner	Title	Publisher
2002	C. J. Box	Open Season	Putnam's, New York 2001
2003	Eddie Muller	The Distance	Scribner, New York 2002
2004	P.J. Tracy	Monkeewrench	Putnam's, New York 2003
2005	Dylan Schaffer	Misdemeanor Man	Bloomsbury, New York 2004
2006	Randall Hicks	The Baby Game	Wordslinger Press, San Diego 2005
2007	John Hart	The King of Lies	St. Martin's Minotaur, New York 2006
2008	Sean Chercover	Big City, Bad Blood	William Morrow, New York 2007

=== Lifetime Achievement ===
Year	Prize Winner	Nationality
2002	Ross Thomas	United States
2003	Dick Francis	United Kingdom
2004	Ruth Rendell	United Kingdom
2005	Lawrence Block	United States
2006	Ed McBain	United States
2007	Robert B. Parker	United States
2008	Donald E. Westlake	United States

=== Best Crime Fiction Website (2002/3: "Best Author Website") ===
Year	Prize Winner	Website	
2002	Lee Child	Official Site of Lee Child and Jack Reacher	Author site
2003	Michael Connelly	Official Website of Bestselling Author Mike Connelly	Author site
2004	Sarah Weinman	Confessions of Idiosyncratic Mind	Weblog
2005	January Magazine's Crime Fiction Section	January Magazine	Literature-Online magazine
2006	CrimeSpot.net (Graham Powell)	CrimeSpot.net	Weblog
2007	Demolition Magazine	Demolition Magazine	Literature-Online magazine
2008	The Thrilling Detective Web Site	Thrilling Detective	Website (Kevin Burton Smith)

== See also ==
- List of crime writers
