= Bouchercon XXV =

1994 mystery and detective fiction convention

- Date: October 6, 1994
- Location: Seattle, Washington
- Country: USA
- Hosted by: Thom Walls

Bouchercon is an annual convention of creators and devotees of mystery and detective fiction. It is named in honour of writer, reviewer, and editor Anthony Boucher; also the inspiration for the Anthony Awards, which have been issued at the convention since 1986. This page details Bouchercon XXV and the 9th Anthony Awards ceremony.

== Bouchercon ==
The convention was held in Seattle, Washington from October 6 to 9, 1994. The event was chaired by photographer Thom Walls.

=== Special Guests ===
- Lifetime Achievement award — Tony Hillerman
- Guest of Honor — Marcia Muller
- Fan guest of Honor — Art Scott
- Toastmaster — George C. Chesbro

== Anthony Awards ==
The following list details the awards distributed at the ninth annual Anthony Awards ceremony.

=== Novel award ===
Winner:

- Marcia Muller, Wolf in the Shadows

Shortlist:

- Michael Connelly, The Black Ice
- Earl Emerson, Morons and Madmen
- Joan Hess, O Little Town of Maggody
- Tony Hillerman, Sacred Clowns
- Janet LaPierre, Old Enemies
- Margaret Maron, Southern Discomfort
- Kathy Hogan Trocheck, To Live and Die in Dixie
- Minette Walters, The Sculptress
- Charlene Weir, Consider the Crows

=== First novel award ===
Winner:

- Nevada Barr, Track of the Cat

Shortlist:

- Jan Burke, Goodnight, Irene
- Laurie R. King, A Grave Talent
- Sharan Newman, Death Comes as Epiphany
- Abigail Padgett, Child of Silence

=== Short story award ===
Winner:

- Susan Dunlap, "Checkout", from Malice Domestic 2

Shortlist:

- K.K. Beck, "A Romance in the Rockies", from Malice Domestic 2
- M.D. Lake, "Kim's Game", from Malice Domestic 2
- Robert Lopresti, "Crow's Feat", from Constable New Crimes 2

=== Critical / Non-fiction award ===
Winner:

- Ed Gorman, Martin H. Greenberg, Larry Segriff & Jon L. Breen, The Fine Art of Murder: The Mystery Reader's Indispensable Companion

Shortlist:

- Burl Barer, The Saint: A Complete History in Print, Radio, Television, and Film
- Marvin Lachman, A Reader's Guide to the American Novel of Detection
- Gary Warren Niebuhr, A Reader's Guide to the Private Eye Novel
- Barbara Reynolds, Dorothy L Sayers; Her Life and Soul

=== True crime award ===
Winner:

- Ann Rule, A Rose for Her Grave and Other True Cases

Shortlist:

- Gary C. King, Driven to Kill: Westley Allan Dodd
- Jack Olsen, The Misbegotten Son: A Serial Killer and His Victims: The true story of Arthur J. Shawcross
- Bella Stumbo, Until the Twelfth of Never: The Deadly Divorce of Dan & Betty Broderick

=== Short story collection / anthology award ===
Winner:

- Martin H. Greenberg, Mary Higgins Clark Presents Malice Domestic 2

Shortlist:

- Lawrence Block, Some Days You Get the Bear
- Joseph Hansen, Bohannon's Country
- Ed Hoch, The Year's Best Mystery and Suspense Stories-1993
- Marcia Muller, Ed Gorman & Bill Pronzini, Criminal Intent 1
