= The Harrowing =

The Harrowing may refer to

- "The Harrowing" (Inside No. 9), a 2014 episode of British dark comedy series Inside No. 9
- The Harrowing (novel), a 2006 novel by Alexandra Sokoloff
- The Harrowing, a 2016 novel by James Aitcheson
- The Harrowing of Hell, in Christian theology
- The Harrowing (novel), a 2020 novel by RW Duder
