= Edge of Seventeen (disambiguation) =

"Edge of Seventeen" is a 1981 song by Stevie Nicks.

Edge of Seventeen may also refer to:

- Edge of Seventeen (film), a 1998 film starring Chris Stafford
- "The Edge of Seventeen", a short story by Alexandra Sokoloff
- The Edge of Seventeen, a 2016 film
