= Dead Run =

Dead Run may refer to:

- Dead run, running downwind when sailing
- Dead Run (novel), a 2005 novel by P. J. Tracy
- Dead Run (film), a 1967 American-German-French-Italian film
- "Dead Run" (The Twilight Zone), an episode from the 1985 television series The Twilight Zone
