= Donna Andrews =

Donna Andrews may refer to:

- Donna Andrews (golfer) (born 1967), American golfer
- Donna Andrews (author), American mystery fiction writer
- Donna Andrews (EastEnders), a fictional character in the British TV soap opera EastEnders
