= The Blind Man of Seville =

- First edition
- Author: Robert Wilson
- Language: English
- Series: Javier Falcón, #1
- Genre: Fiction, Crime fiction
- Publisher: HarperCollins
- Publication date: 2003
- Publication place: United Kingdom
- Media type: Print (Hardback), (Paperback)
- ISBN: 0-00-711779-5
- OCLC: 59467666
- Followed by: The Silent and the Damned

The Blind Man of Seville is a 2003 crime novel and thriller by British writer Robert Wilson. The novel is set in the Spanish city of Seville, and is the first book in a quartet featuring protagonist Javier Falcón. The novel was published to much acclaim, and was shortlisted for the 2003 Gold Dagger for Best Crime Novel of the Year.

== Plot summary ==
It is Holy Week in Seville – Semana Santa, the Easter week of passion and processions. A leading restaurateur is found bound, gagged and dead in front of his television set. His self-inflicted wounds reveal his struggle to avoid the unbearable images he has been forced to watch. When confronted with this horrific scene, the normally cool and dispassionate homicide detective, Inspector Jefe Javier Falcón, is inexplicably afraid. Looking into the victim's ruined face, he asks himself: "What could be so terrible?" The investigation into the restaurateur's turbulent life leads Falcón to explore his own past and the candid journals of his late father, a world-famous artist. Painful revelations unsettle Falcón's unreliable memories, while further killings push him towards a terrifying truth. He realises that the investigation is not just a hunt for an all-seeing murderer who knows his victims' secrets, but also a search for his own missing heart.

== Television ==
The book was adapted in two parts for the Sky television series Falcón starring Marton Csokas in the title role. Produced by Mammoth Screen and broadcast on the 15 and 22 November 2012.
