= Inner City Blues =

Inner City Blues may refer to:

- "Inner City Blues (Make Me Wanna Holler)" is a song by Marvin Gaye
- Inner City Blues (Grover Washington Jr. album)
- Inner City Blues: The Music of Marvin Gaye, a tribute album
- Inner City Blues (novel), a crime novel by Paula L. Woods
- "Inner City Blues", a song by Rodriguez from the album Cold Fact
