= Schwegel =

Schwegel may refer to:

- Three-hole pipe, a musical instrument usually played alongside tabor (drum)
- Theresa Schwegel (born 1975), American writer
