= Live Bait =

Live Bait may refer to:

- fishing bait
- live food
- Live Bait (album), an album by The Arrogant Worms
- Live Bait (film), a film by Bruce Sweeney
- Live Bait (novel), a novel by P. J. Tracy
- "Live Bait" (The Walking Dead), an episode of the television series The Walking Dead
