= Killing Critics =

1995 book by Carol O'Connell

- First general publication (UK)
- Author: Carol O'Connell
- Language: English
- Series: Kathleen Mallory series
- Genre: Mystery novel
- Publisher: Hutchinson (UK, Apr 1996); Putnam (US, Jun 1996)
- Publication date: 1995 (limited edition)
- Publication place: US
- Media type: Print
- Pages: 308
- ISBN: 978-0-39-914168-3
- OCLC: 33333476
- Preceded by: The Man Who Cast Two Shadows
- Followed by: Stone Angel

Killing Critics (1996) is the third book in the Kathleen Mallory series by American writer Carol O'Connell. Mallory investigates the murder of Dean Starr, an artist killed in the middle of an exhibition. The killer made the murder appear to be performance art.

Mallory and her partner, Sergeant Riker, find links to a double murder that occurred 12 years ago in an art gallery owned by the same man. Mallory's late father, Markowitz, was on that case and, although he got a confession and a conviction, he never for a minute believed that he had the right man. The NYPD considers the old case closed, and will not allow the partners to officially investigate.

Many of the same characters are involved in both killings:

- J.L. Quinn, art critic whose niece was one of the first victims
- Avril Koozeman, gallery owner
- Emma Sue Halloran, former art critic, now a "culturecrat"

The New York City art world is a key character in the novel. The book also expands on Mallory's troubled childhood.

== Publication ==
Killing Critics was first published in 1995 as a limited edition of 85 numbered, marbled, signed copies by Scorpion Press in the UK, before more general publication the following year.
