= The Ignorance of Blood =

Final novel by Robert Wilson

- First edition
- Author: Robert Wilson
- Language: English
- Series: Javier Falcón, #4
- Genre: Fiction, crime fiction
- Publisher: HarperCollins
- Publication date: 2009
- Publication place: United Kingdom
- Media type: Print (hardback, paperback)
- ISBN: 978-0547335872
- Preceded by: The Hidden Assassins

The Ignorance of Blood is the final novel in Robert Wilson's Javier Falcón series, set in Seville.
