= Rob Hart (author) =

American author (born 1982)

- Born: 1982 (age 43–44); Staten Island, New York City, New York, United States
- Education: State University of New York at Purchase
- Occupation: Novelist
- Website: robwhart.com

Rob Hart (born 1982 in New York, USA) is an American author, novelist and former journalist. He is best known for his novel The Warehouse and for the Ash McKenna series.

== Early life and education ==
Hart was born and raised on Staten Island, New York City, New York. He graduated from Monsignor Farrell High School in 2000 and earned a degree in journalism from the State University of New York at Purchase in 2004.

== Career ==
Hart worked as a reporter for the Staten Island Advance, covering general assignment and state politics. Thereafter, he was the communications director for New York City Councilman Domenic Recchia. He was the publisher for Mysterious Press, where he published and edited crime and mystery novels, and was the class director at LitReactor.

He has written short stories for publications like Thuglit, Joyland, and The Helix. He has also written non-fiction articles for Salon, The Daily Beast, Literary Hub, Birth.Movies.Death, and Electric Literature.

He is the writer of the Ash McKenna novels, a five-book crime thriller series. The first entry, New Yorked, was nominated for an Anthony Award for Best First Novel in 2016.

In 2017, Hart collaborated with James Patterson on the mystery crime novel Scott Free. In 2018, Hart's novel The Warehouse was sold to Crown Publishing Group at Penguin Random House and director Ron Howard optioned the film rights for the book.

Hart wrote the short story "Due on Batuu" for the 2020 Star Wars anthology From a Certain Point of View: The Empire Strikes Back, featuring the character Willrow Hood.

In 2022, Kirkus Reviews named Hart's book The Paradox Hotel one of the best science fiction and fantasy books of the year.

== Publications ==
=== Standalone books ===
- The Last Safe Place: A Zombie Novella (2013)
- Take-Out: And Other Tales of Culinary Crime (2019)
- The Warehouse (2019)
- Blood Oath (2022)
- The Paradox Hotel (2022)
- Assassins Anonymous (2024)
- The Medusa Protocol (2025)
- Three Hitmen and a Baby (2026)

=== Ash McKenna series ===
- New Yorked (2015)
- Bad Beat (2016)
- City of Rose (2016)
- South Village (2016)
- The Woman from Prague (2017)
- Potter's Field (2018)
