= A Small Death in Lisbon =

1999 novel by Robert Wilson

- First edition cover
- Author: Robert Wilson
- Language: English
- Genre: crime novel
- Publisher: HarperCollins
- Publication date: 19 July 1999 (1st edition)
- Publication place: United Kingdom (london)
- Media type: Print (hardcover)
- Pages: 400p.
- ISBN: 0-00-232668-X
- OCLC: 59402427

A Small Death in Lisbon is a crime novel by Robert Wilson. The novel won the CWA Gold Dagger Award in 1999, and the German Crime Prize (for an International Novel) in 2003.

== Notes ==
- Zé Coelho shares some characteristics with his Spanish counterpart, Inspector jefe Javier Falcón, such as:
  - Lost his wife; Falcón is divorced - they both long for their wives;
  - Has stress problems, as Falcón;
  - They both discover that past friendships are not as they seem: Coelho with his friend Borrego, and Falcón with his father.

== Publication history ==
- 1999, London: HarperCollins ISBN 0-00-232668-X, Pub date 19 July 1999, Hardback
- 2000, London: HarperCollins ISBN 0-00-651202-X, Pub date 2 May 2000, Paperback
- 2000, New York: Harcourt ISBN 0151006091, Pub date October 2000, Hardback
- 2002, New York: Berkeley Books ISBN 0-425-18423-4, Pub date March 2002, Paperback
