= The Silent and the Damned =

2004 novel by Robert Wilson

- First edition
- Author: Robert Wilson
- Language: English
- Series: Javier Falcón, #2
- Genre: Fiction, Crime fiction
- Publisher: HarperCollins
- Publication date: 2004
- Publication place: United Kingdom
- Media type: Print (Hardback), (Paperback)
- ISBN: 0-00-711783-3
- OCLC: 56582431
- Preceded by: The Blind Man of Seville
- Followed by: The Hidden Assassins

The Silent and the Damned (also known as The Vanished Hands) is the second novel in Robert Wilson's critically acclaimed Javier Falcón series, set in Seville. The novel won the Gumshoe Award for Best European Crime Novel in 2006 in the US, where the novel was published with the title The Vanished Hands, and was also selected by January Magazine as among the best crime fiction of 2004.

== Plot summary ==
Mario Vega is seven years old and his life is about to change forever. Across the street in an exclusive suburb of Seville his father is splayed out dead on the kitchen floor, while his mother lies in bed upstairs, suffocated under her own pillow. It appears to be a suicide pact, but Inspector Jefe Javier Falcón has his doubts when he finds an enigmatic note crushed into the dead man's hand.

In the brutal summer heat Falcón begins to dismantle the obscure life of Rafael Vega only to receive threats from the Russian mafia, who have begun operating in the city. His investigation includes the neighbours: on one side a creative American couple with a destructive past and on the other a famous actor, whose only son is in prison for an appalling crime. Opposite lives Consuelo Jiménez, who Falcón has met before when she was suspected of murdering her husband.

Within days two further suicides follow – one of them a senior policeman – while a forest fire rages through the hills above Seville, obliterating all in its path. And Falcón is left to sweat out the truth, which will reveal that everything is connected and that there is one more terrible secret in the black heart of Vega's life.
