= American Spy =

Novel by Lauren Wilkinson

First edition

American Spy is a novel by Lauren Wilkinson, published in February 2019 by Random House. Barack Obama included the book on his 2019 summer reading list. The novel details the struggle and growth of Marie, an African American woman, as she recounts her time in the FBI.

== Awards ==
Year	Award	Category	Result	Ref.
2019	Center for Fiction First Novel Prize	—	Shortlisted	
2020	Anthony Award	First Novel	Shortlisted	
2020	Edgar Award	First Novel	Shortlisted	
2020	HWA Crown Award	HWA Debut Crown	Shortlisted	
2020	Macavity Awards	First Mystery	Shortlisted	
