= The Ice Harvest =

- Theatrical release poster
- Directed by: Harold Ramis
- Screenplay by: Richard Russo; Robert Benton
- Based on: The Ice Harvest by Scott Phillips
- Produced by: Albert Berger; Ron Yerxa
- Starring: John Cusack; Billy Bob Thornton; Connie Nielsen; Randy Quaid; Oliver Platt; Mike Starr
- Cinematography: Alar Kivilo
- Edited by: Lee Percy
- Music by: David Kitay
- Distributed by: Focus Features
- Release dates: September 3, 2005 (Deauville); November 23, 2005
- Running time: 89 minutes
- Country: United States
- Language: English
- Box office: $10.2 million

The Ice Harvest is a 2005 American neo-noir black comedy film directed by Harold Ramis, written by Richard Russo and Robert Benton, based on the 2000 novel of the same name by Scott Phillips. It stars John Cusack, Billy Bob Thornton, and Connie Nielsen, with Randy Quaid and Oliver Platt in supporting roles. It was distributed by Focus Features, and it was released on VHS and DVD on February 28, 2006. It is the last Focus Features film released on VHS format. The Ice Harvest grossed $10.2 million worldwide.

== Plot ==
On Christmas Eve in Wichita, Kansas, lawyer Charlie Arglist and pornographer Vic Cavanaugh prepare to leave town after stealing $2 million from their boss, mobster Bill Guerrard. However, icy roads force them to postpone their getaway. Vic holds the cash when they split up, biding their time until the roads clear.

Charlie visits Sweet Cage, a local strip club owned by Vic and run by Renata Crest, a woman whom Charlie has long lusted after. She deduces he is hiding something. Charlie hints at the money, and she suggests they run away together. Taking advantage of the perceived situation, Renata asks Charlie to steal an incriminating photo of a local politician from Vic and give it to her so she can leverage it to keep the city from shutting down her club.

After talking to his friend Sidney, a bartender and bouncer at Sweet Cage, Charlie goes to another strip club owned by Vic, the Tease-O-Rama, and takes the photo from a safe. Before he can leave, Roy Gelles, one of Guerrard's enforcers, arrives looking for Charlie. Charlie hides in the men's restroom as Gelles enters. The enforcer reads aloud a graffito written in red sharpie on the wall above the urinal, "As Wichita falls, so falls Wichita Falls".

After evading Gelles, Charlie goes to a restaurant/bar, running into his friend Pete, who is married to Charlie's ex-wife Sarabeth. Pete is drunk and decides to tag along with Charlie for as long as it takes to pass out. Charlie calls Vic from a pay phone, where he sees the same red graffito written above the phone. Charlie says that Gelles is in town, but Vic dismisses this, as he knows Gelles has family in Wichita.

Charlie returns to Sweet Cage and gives Renata the photo. She says that Vic had called to warn Charlie that Gelles was indeed tailing them. Charlie takes Pete home, where he passes out on the living room floor. Charlie "borrows" a Mercedes Benz that Pete had bought for Sarabeth, because Pete had vomited in Charlie's car. He drives to Vic's home and finds Vic's wife shot in the head and lying next to the Christmas tree.

Vic arrives and reveals that he has locked Gelles in a trunk. They take Gelles and the body of Vic's wife in the Mercedes and drive to a lake. Gelles continues to yell at them from the trunk, claiming that Vic shot his own wife. Annoyed, Vic shoots into the trunk, silencing Gelles.

As Charlie and Vic get the trunk onto the lake dock, Gelles shoots it open from the inside, hitting Vic in the process. After Gelles gets out, a standoff ends with his death. Vic falls into the frozen lake as the dock collapses. Charlie realizes that Vic was going to kill him, so he drags Vic's wife to the collapsed dock and slides her into the lake, knocking the pleading Vic underwater. After discovering the money is not in Vic's bag, Charlie runs back to the dock to save Vic, but he has already drowned, entwined with his dead wife.

Returning to Sweet Cage, Charlie finds that Guerrard has come to town, and has tied up Renata. A struggle ensues, ending with Charlie stabbed in the foot and Guerrard dead. Charlie and Renata return to her place, where he finds the money hidden in her closet while she showers. It is revealed that Vic and Renata planned to run away together after killing Charlie. Charlie shoots her before she can cut his throat with a hidden straight razor.

While driving out of town with the money, Charlie sees Sidney on the side of the road with his kids in a motor home and stops to offer assistance. Sidney says that he is out of gas, so Charlie lets him siphon some out of the "borrowed" Mercedes. As Sidney tries to restart the RV, Charlie takes out a red sharpie and writes "As Wichita falls, so falls Wichita Falls" on the back of the motor home, revealing that he was the one writing the graffito all over Wichita. Sidney gets the motor home started and, after accidentally knocking Charlie down when the RV lurches backwards, he drives away.

Charlie gets up and returns to the Mercedes. Pete wakes up in the back seat, and the duo drive away together for breakfast and warmer weather.

== Cast ==
- John Cusack as Charlie Arglist
- Billy Bob Thornton as Vincent 'Vic' Cavanaugh
- Connie Nielsen as Renata Crest
- Randy Quaid as Bill Guerrard
- Oliver Platt as Pete Van Heuten
- Mike Starr as Roy Gelles
- Ned Bellamy as Sidney
- T.J. Jagodowski as Officer Tyler
- David Pasquesi as Councilman Williams

== Production ==
Because director Harold Ramis really liked the script material, he agreed to make the film at eighty per cent off his usual fee. He had often collaborated with actor Bill Murray, and hoped to persuade him to take the role of Bill Guerrard, but Murray refused to relent from their decade-long falling out. Monica Bellucci was originally set to play the role of Renata, but had to leave due to her pregnancy.

Ramis almost had to close production for a day due to the weather, but persisted. He did not want to spoil his record of never losing a shooting day.

Filming took place in the suburbs of Chicago.

== Reception ==
The Ice Harvest opened in 1,550 theaters in North America and grossed $3.7 million, averaging $2,413 per theater and ranking 10th at the box office. The film ultimately earned $9 million in the US and $1.1 million internationally for a total of $10.2 million.

The film has a rating of 47% on Rotten Tomatoes based on 134 reviews and an average rating of 5.50/10. The consensus states: "The Ice Harvest offers a couple of laughs, but considering the people involved, it should be a lot funnier." On Metacritic, the film has a score of 62 out of 100 based on 32 reviews, indicating "generally favorable reviews". Audiences polled by CinemaScore gave the film an average grade of "D" on an A+ to F scale.

James Berardinelli of Reelviews gave the film 2 1/2 stars out of four, saying, "Despite its brevity, it seems padded, with all sorts of irrelevant scenes and dead-end subplots taking up time. [...] Next time, Ramis should work to his strengths, and film noir isn't one of them. The Ice Harvest will have melted away long before the turkey leftovers are polished off."

Roger Ebert gave the film 3 out of 4 stars and said: "I liked the movie for the quirky way it pursues humor through the drifts of greed, lust, booze, betrayal and spectacularly complicated ways to die. I liked it for Charlie's essential kindness, as when he pauses during a getaway to help a friend who has run out of gas. And for the scene-stealing pathos of Oliver Platt's drunk, who like many drunks in the legal profession achieves a rhetorical grandiosity during the final approach to oblivion. And I liked especially the way Roy, the man in the trunk, keeps on thinking positively, even after Vic puts bullets through both ends of the trunk because he can't remember which end of the trunk Roy's head is at. Maybe it's in the middle."

== Home media ==
The Ice Harvest was released on DVD and VHS on February 28, 2006, as part of the Focus Features Spotlight Series. The DVD extras consist of alternate endings, outtakes, and making-of featurettes.

== See also ==
- List of Christmas films
