= Dead Run (novel) =

2005 novel by P. J. Tracy

- First edition
- Author: P. J. Tracy
- Language: English
- Genre: Thriller, Crime, Mystery novel
- Publisher: G. P. Putnam's Sons
- Publication date: 2005
- Publication place: United States
- Media type: Print (Paperback)
- Pages: 304 pp (US Hardback)
- ISBN: 978-0-7181-4758-7 (US Hardback)
- OCLC: 57751086
- Preceded by: Live Bait
- Followed by: Snow Blind

Dead Run is the third book by mother and daughter authors P. J. Tracy. It follows on from their first and second books, Monkeewrench and Live Bait and has the same principal characters.

== Reception ==
Kirkus Reviews wrote of it: "A ruthlessly efficient straight-arrow tale that’s a welcome change of pace for the Monkeewrench gang, even though both their peculiar talents and their even more peculiar personalities are seriously underemployed."

Publishers Weekly wrote: "The jokes, cold-blooded murders and the past secrets sometimes work at cross-purposes, but the courage and indomitable spirit of the plucky trio will win readers over as they speed through the final pages of the race-against-the-clock ending."

Entertainment Weekly said the plot "delivers both laughs and a sense of peril."
