= Pretty Little Things =

2010 novel by Jilliane Hoffman

- First edition (US)
- Author: Jilliane Hoffman
- Language: English
- Publisher: HarperCollins
- Publication date: September 7, 2010
- Publication place: United States
- Pages: about 470 (paperback)
- ISBN: 978-0-00-731160-6
- Preceded by: Plea of Insanity (2007)

Pretty Little Things is a 2010 novel by Jilliane Hoffman. It was released in the USA on September 7, 2010, and deals with the topics of internet crime and missing and exploited children and is set in the Miami and Fort Lauderdale area. In addition to the US release, the book has enjoyed a considerable success on the German market, titled Mädchenfänger, with a #5 rank among new novel releases.

Hoffman wrote the book based on her own professional experience; before her career as a writer, she worked in the Florida Department of Law Enforcement consulting with special agents.

== Plot summary ==
Thirteen-year-old Elaine Emerson, nicknamed Lainey, encounters a boy on the internet while hiding behind a profile indicating her age as 16. She goes on a date with Zach, nicknamed El Capitan, and never returns from the date. Special Agent Bobby Dees, head of the department's Crimes Against Children Squad, tries to uncover the truth about her.

== Main characters ==
Zachary M. Cusano is the son of Violet and Thomas Cusano. He is the captain of the Jupiter High School football team, and arranges to go on a date with Lainey believing her to be 16. He is known as "El Capitan" throughout the book.

Elaine Louise Emerson, known as "Lainey" is the daughter of Debbie LaManna and the stepdaughter of Todd LaManna. She has a sister Liza and a brother Bradley. She has a Myspace account in which she lies about her age claiming to be 16 not 13. She arranges to go on a date with El Capitan, and fails to return.

Bobby Dees is an NYPD special agent in the novels equivalent of the missing children department. His own daughter went missing several years prior.

Debbie LaManna is Elaine's mother. She is constantly stressed, and considers her husband Todd's feelings over Elaine's.

Todd LaManna is Bradley's father, and Elaine's stepfather. He is a used-car salesman, and having an affair.

Molly is Elaine's best friend, and gives Agent Dees some insight at the beginning of the novel.

Liza is Lainey's 16 year old sister, and experiments with drugs and alcohol. She has run away from home at least once before.

== Places and locations ==
The book is largely set at real-world locations. Elaine's former school is Ramblewood Middle School in Coral Springs, FL. Her new school is Sawgrass Middle School.
