= Lauren Wilkinson (writer) =

American fiction writer

Lauren Wilkinson is an American fiction writer. Her debut novel American Spy was published by Random House in February 2019 in the US and in July 2019 in the UK via Dialogue Books.

== Early life ==
Wilkson grew up in New York City. She earned an MFA in fiction and literary translation from Columbia University.

== Career ==
Wilkinson has taught writing at Columbia University and the Fashion Institute of Technology. She was a 2013 Center for Fiction Emerging Writer's Fellow, and has received support from both the MacDowell Colony and the Djerassi Resident Artists Program. Her fiction and essays have appeared in or are forthcoming from Granta, The Believer, and The Millions, among other publications.

American Spy received praise ahead of its release and was a Spring 2019 Barnes & Noble “Discover Great New Writers” pick. It was also included by HuffPost in its "61 Books We're looking forward to Reading in 2019" Upon release, it received acclaim. Michael Schaub, writing for NPR, called it an "expertly written spy thriller" and a "deeply intelligent literary novel", highlighting its discussion of challenging topics about politics and social dynamics, and The Washington Post's Maureen Corrigan said that it was "extraordinary in a lot of ways". In August 2019, Barack Obama included American Spy on his summer reading list. The New York Times selected American Spy for its "100 Notable Books of 2019" and it was the June 2020 selection for the PBS NewsHour-New York Times book club.

Wilkinson splits her time between New York and Los Angeles, to work as a screenwriter for television shows.

== Awards ==
| Year | Work | Award | Category | Result | Ref. |
|---|---|---|---|---|---|
| 2019 | American Spy | Center for Fiction First Novel Prize | — | Shortlisted | |
| 2020 | American Spy | Anthony Award | First Novel | Shortlisted | |
| 2020 | American Spy | Edgar Award | First Novel | Shortlisted | |
| 2020 | American Spy | HWA Crown Award | HWA Debut Crown | Shortlisted | |
| 2020 | American Spy | Macavity Awards | First Mystery | Shortlisted | |

== List of works ==
- —— (2019). American Spy (hardcover 1st ed.). New York: Random House. ISBN 9780812998955.
