= Robert Wilson (crime novelist) =

British crime writer (born 1957)

- Born: 1957 (age 68–69); Stanford, Kent, England
- Education: University of Oxford
- Occupation: Novelist
- Writing career
- Genre: Crime

Robert Wilson (born 1957) is a British crime writer currently resident in Portugal. He is the son of an RAF fighter pilot, and has a degree in English from Oxford. Wilson is the author of the Bruce Medway series, set in and around Benin, West Africa, and the Javier Falcón series, set largely in Seville, Spain. He is also the author of the espionage novel The Company of Strangers and A Small Death In Lisbon, which consists of a historically split narrative, and won the CWA Gold Dagger in 1999. He was shortlisted for the same award again in 2003 for The Blind Man of Seville, the first in the Javier Falcón series. The second novel in the series, The Silent and the Damned (titled: The Vanished Hands in the United States), won the 2006 Gumshoe Award for Best European Crime Novel, presented by Mystery Ink.

The Javier Falcón series has been adapted for Sky television by Mammoth Screen titled Falcón with Marton Csokas in the title role.

== Bibliography ==
Bruce Medway series

1. Instruments of Darkness – 1995
2. The Big Killing – 1996
3. Blood Is Dirt – 1997
4. A Darkening Stain – 1998

Javier Falcón series

1. The Blind Man of Seville – 2003
2. The Silent and the Damned – 2004 (published as The Vanished Hands in the US)
3. The Hidden Assassins – 2006
4. The Ignorance of Blood – 2009

Charles Boxer series

1. Capital Punishment – 2013
2. You Will Never Find Me – 2014
3. Stealing People – 2015
4. Hear No Lies (not published in the UK)

Non-series novels

- A Small Death in Lisbon – 1999
- The Company of Strangers – 2001
