= The Hidden Assassins =

2006 novel by Robert Wilson

- Author: Robert Wilson
- Language: English
- Series: Javier Falcón, #3
- Genre: Fiction, Crime fiction
- Publisher: HarperCollins
- Publication date: 2006
- Publication place: United Kingdom
- Media type: Print (Hardback), (Paperback)
- ISBN: 0-00-720290-3
- OCLC: 156584183
- Dewey Decimal: 823/.914 22
- LC Class: PR6073.I474 H53 2006
- Preceded by: The Silent and the Damned
- Followed by: The Ignorance of Blood

The Hidden Assassins is a 2006 novel by Robert Wilson, the third in his acclaimed Javier Falcón series, set in Seville.

== Plot summary ==
As Inspector Jefe Javier Falcón investigates a mutilated, faceless corpse unearthed on the municipal dump, a massive explosion rocks the beautiful, peaceful city of Seville. An apartment building collapses and a nearby pre-school is devastated, killing and wounding men, women and children. When it is discovered that there was a mosque in the basement of the apartment building the media is quick to assume it is the work of Islamist terrorists.

As a late, high summer heat tightens its grip, panic sweeps through the city and the population flees while the region is put on red alert. More bodies are dragged from the rubble and terror invades the domestic life of the flamboyant judge, Esteban Calderón, and the troubled mind of the captivating Consuelo Jiménez.

With the media and political pressure intensifying, Falcón refuses to be swayed and begins to realise that all is not as it seems. But just as he comes close to cracking the conspiracy he makes the most terrifying discovery of all, and then the race is on to prevent a major catastrophe far beyond Spain's borders.
