= Kristen Lepionka =

- Born: Columbus, Ohio, United States
- Occupation: Novelist
- Website: www.kristenlepionka.com

Kristen Lepionka is an American crime fiction writer known for her Roxane Weary private investigator series.

== Career ==
She began a draft of The Last Place You Look in November 2014 and completed it in about six months. She entered the manuscript in Pitch Wars, which gave her the opportunity to work with a mentor and eventually resulted in the book's publication. The Last Place You Look was the first book starring private investigator Roxane Weary. The Roxane Weary books have been praised for their representation of bisexuality.

Since 2015, Lepionka has been the editor of Betty Fedora, feminist crime fiction journal. She co-hosts a podcast called "Unlikeable Female Characters".

== Personal life ==
Lepionka lives in Columbus, Ohio with her partner Joanna. Like her character, Roxane Weary, Lepionka is bisexual.

== Books ==
- Roxane Weary books
  - The Last Place You Look (2017, St. Martin's/Minotaur)
  - What You Want to See (2018, St. Martin's/Minotaur)
  - The Stories You Tell (2019, St. Martin's/Minotaur)
  - Once You Go This Far (2020, St. Martin's/Minotaur)

== Awards and nominations ==
| Year | Award | Work | Result | Ref. |
|---|---|---|---|---|
| 2018 | Shamus Award for Best First P.I. Novel | The Last Place You Look | Won | |
| 2018 | Anthony Award for Best First Novel | The Last Place You Look | Finalist | |
| 2018 | Macavity Award for Best First Mystery (Novel) | The Last Place You Look | Finalist | |
| 2018 | Bisexual Book Awards - Mystery | The Last Place You Look | Nominated | |
| 2019 | Shamus Award for Best P. I. Hardcover Novel | What You Want to See | Won | |
