= The Man Who Cast Two Shadows =

- First edition (UK) under alternative title
- Author: Carol O'Connell
- Language: English
- Series: Kathleen Mallory
- Genre: Mystery novel
- Publisher: Hutchinson (UK, Mar 1995); Putnam (US, Jun 1995)
- Publication place: United States
- Media type: Print(Paperback & Hardcover); Audio CD
- Pages: 278
- ISBN: 978-0-399-14064-8
- OCLC: 31605393
- Preceded by: Mallory's Oracle
- Followed by: Killing Critics

The Man Who Cast Two Shadows is the second book in the Kathleen Mallory series written by Carol O'Connell, published as The Man Who Lied to Women in the UK.

Mallory is a detective in New York City's Special Crimes Unit. Her colleagues fear she has been killed when a body is found in a park, similar in appearance and wearing a blazer embroidered with her name. Mallory quickly identifies the victim (whose fingers have been destroyed to hamper a positive ID) and she is given the case. The detectives only have three clues to work with including an unpublished manuscript, a missing computer file and a cat who knows the murderer. The clues point to three possible suspects who all live in the same building. Mallory starts baiting the killer with computer messages, but ends up becoming bait herself.
