= Kathleen Mallory =

Fictional character

Kathleen 'Kathy' Mallory is a fictional character featured in eleven mystery novels by author Carol O'Connell. The novels in the series include Mallory's Oracle (1994), The Man Who Cast Two Shadows (1995), Killing Critics (1996), Stone Angel (1997), Shell Game (1999), Crime School (2002), Dead Famous (2003), Winter House (2004), Find Me (2006 / UK edition title: Shark Music), The Chalk Girl (2012), and It Happens In The Dark (2013).

Mallory is described by her creator as a sociopath. Emotionally scarred as a 6-year-old after she witnessed the murder of her mother in a small Louisiana town, Mallory flees to New York City, where she lives as a street child. She is caught trying to steal by police officer Louis Markowitz, who takes her home and becomes her foster father.

From age 10, Kathy, a "baby sociopath," grows up surrounded by Markowitz and his colorful circle of friends, including his partner, Sgt. Riker, who later becomes Kathy's partner and friend. As an adult, she becomes a detective in the NYPD. Genius Charles Butler assists Kathy in her side computer technology business and is in love with her, though she remains oblivious. Mallory is a tall, green-eyed, curly haired blonde in her mid-twenties at the start of the series. She is often compared to a cat toying with its prey.
