= Carol O'Connell =

American author (born 1947)

Carol O'Connell (born May 26, 1947, in New York) is an author of crime fiction, including a series of a dozen mysteries featuring a sociopathic but gifted detective, Kathy Mallory, of the New York Police Department (NYPD).

After O'Connell earned a Bachelor of Fine Arts in painting from Arizona State University, she embarked on a career as an artist, writing fiction "in the closet" as a hobby.

She grew more interested in writing fiction than in her art career. After initially having the manuscript for her first book, Mallory's Oracle, turned down by American publishers, she sold publication rights to British publisher, Hutchinson, with rights auctioned to European publishers. It next was acquired for the U.S. and Canadian markets by Putnam in an $800,000 two-book deal.

== Bibliography ==
NYPD Det. Kathy Mallory

1. Mallory's Oracle – May 1994
2. The Man Who Cast Two Shadows – July 1, 1996; UK: The Man Who Lied to Women
3. Killing Critics – UK: July 17, 1997
4. Stone Angel – July 1, 1998; UK: Flight of the Stone Angel – December 19, 2006
5. Shell Game – August 1, 2000
6. Crime School – September 9, 2002
7. Dead Famous – September 7, 2004; UK: The Jury Must Die – August 19, 2004
8. Winter House – September 6, 2005
9. Find Me – October 2, 2007; UK: Shark Music – May 1, 2008
10. The Chalk Girl – July 3, 2012
11. It Happens In The Dark – UK: August 20, 2013
12. Blind Sight – September 20, 2016

Standalone

- The Judas Child – June, 1998
- Bone by Bone – November 3, 2009
