= Sue Henry =

American novelist

- Born: January 19, 1940; Salmon, Idaho, U.S.
- Died: November 20, 2020 (aged 80)
- Occupation: Writer
- Spouse: Paul K. Henry (m. 1965)
- Children: 2
- Writing career
- Genre: Mystery fiction
- Notable work: Murder on the Iditarod Trail (1991)
- Notable awards: Macavity Award (1992); Anthony Award (1992)

Sue Henry (January 19, 1940 – November 20, 2020) was an American writer of mystery thriller fiction. She was also a librarian, college administrator, and instructor at the University of Alaska.

== Biography ==
According to her obituary in the Anchorage Daily News, she was born Mathilda Sue Hall in Salmon, Idaho, and married Paul K. Henry in 1965; they had two boys, Bruce and Eric. After they divorced, she moved the boys to Fairbanks, Alaska in 1975.

Her first book Murder on the Iditarod Trail (1991), was well reviewed and won both the Macavity Awards and Anthony Awards for best first novel, prompting the author to develop a series based on this book's characters, Alaskan state trooper Alex Jensen and Jessie Arnold, a sled dog racer.

In 2005, she started a new mystery series featuring a 63-year-old widow, Maxine McNab, travelling in her Winnebago with a miniature dachshund, Stretch. Maxine had appeared in Dead North (2001) in the first series. Henry went on the road to research the book.

Murder on the Iditarod Trail was filmed for television as The Cold Heart of a Killer (1996) starring Kate Jackson, who bought the rights to the book.

All maps for her books starting with Dead North (2001) were made by her son, Eric Henry.

== Publications ==
=== Alex Jensen and Jessie Arnold series ===
- Murder on the Iditarod Trail (1991) Winner of the Macavity Award and Anthony Awards Awards for Best First Novel, 1992
- Termination Dust (1996)
- Sleeping Lady (1996)
- Death Takes Passage (1997)
- Deadfall (1998)
- Murder on the Yukon Quest: An Alaska Mystery (1999)
- Beneath the Ashes (2001)
- Dead North (2001)
- Cold Company (2002)
- Death Trap (2003)
- Murder at Five Finger Light (2005)
- Degrees of Separation (2008)
- Cold as Ice (2010) (This book was never released)

=== Maxie and Stretch series ===
- The Serpents Trail (2004)
- The Tooth of Time (2006)
- The Refuge (2007)
- The End of the Road (2009)
