= Murder with Peacocks =

1999 crime novel by Donna Andrews

- First edition
- Author: Donna Andrews
- Genre: Mystery fiction, Humour
- Published: 1999
- Publisher: Thomas Dunne Books
- Pages: 311
- Awards: Anthony Award for Best First Novel (2000)
- ISBN: 978-0-312-93956-4
- Website: Murder with Peacocks

Murder with Peacocks is a crime novel written by Donna Andrews and published by Thomas Dunne Books in January 1999. It was her debut novel. It later went on to win in the Anthony Award for Best First Novel in 2000.

The novel received generally positive reviews, with a focus on its comedy more than its mystery.
