= Denise Hamilton =

American novelist

Denise Hamilton is an American crime novelist, journalist and editor of the Edgar award-winning anthologies Los Angeles Noir and Los Angeles Noir 2: The Classics. Hamilton's five Eve Diamond crime novels have been short-listed for many awards, including the Edgar Award in mystery, Willa Cather award in literary fiction and the UK's Creasey Dagger Award.

== Career ==
Hamilton's novels draw on the city's history, politics, diversity, and culture, and she calls her hometown of Los Angeles “The Ultimate Femme Fatale". Her first novel, The Jasmine Trade, was a national bestseller that grew out of a Los Angeles Times story she wrote about parachute kids – wealthy Asian immigrant children who live alone in big homes while their parents remain in Asia taking care of family business. When Hamilton filed her story, a Times editor asked Hamilton's supervisor to check her facts because she found it hard to believe such an outlandish tale was real.

Hamilton's sixth novel, The Last Embrace, was a 1940s Hollywood noir inspired by the disappearance of Jean Spangler, a starlet linked to L.A. gangster Mickey Cohen.

Her seventh novel, Damage Control, was published by Scribner in September, 2011.

Before turning to fiction, Hamilton was a staff writer for the Los Angeles Times, reporting on the city's sprawling multicultural suburbs. During this time, Hamilton also spent six months in former Yugoslavia on a Fulbright Fellowship and traveled widely in Eastern and Central Europe, and the former Soviet Union during the waning days of Communism, reporting on political, cultural, and economic trends.

The Los Angeles Noir anthologies, (Akashic Books) have been translated into French, Italian, and Russian. The first volume features 17 stories set in different L.A. neighborhoods by authors Michael Connelly, Janet Fitch, Patt Morrison, Susan Straight, Hector Tobar, and others. Los Angeles Noir Volume 2: The Classics reprints stories by James M. Cain, Paul Cain, Raymond Chandler, James Ellroy, Ross Macdonald, Walter Mosley, noir pulp queen Leigh Brackett, and Macdonald's wife Margaret Millar, and range from 1930s to 1990s Los Angeles.

Hamilton also writes Uncommon Scents, a monthly perfume column for the Los Angeles Times.

== Bibliography ==
=== Eve Diamond series ===
- The Jasmine Trade (2001)
- Sugar Skull (2003)
- Last Lullaby (2004)
- Savage Garden (2005)
- Prisoner of Memory (2006)

=== Standalones ===
- The Last Embrace (2008)
- Damage Control (2011)

=== Editor ===
- Los Angeles Noir short story anthology
- Los Angeles Noir 2: The Classics
