= Randall Hicks =

American writer and attorney (born 1956)

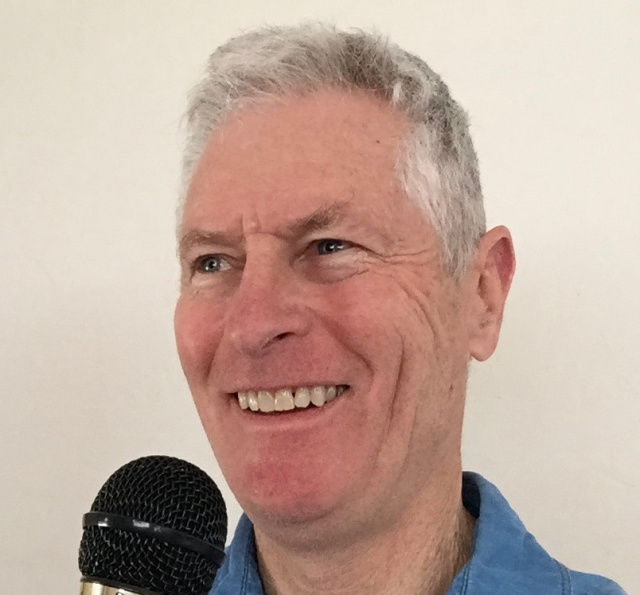
- Randall Hicks at Bouchercon, 2006
- Born: October 28, 1956 (age 69); Orange, California, U.S.
- Education: Pepperdine University School of Law
- Occupations: Author and attorney
- Writing career
- Notable awards: Gumshoe Award (Best Debut Novel)
- Website: www.randallhicks.com

Randall Hicks (born October 28, 1956) is an American writer and attorney.

== Early life ==
Randall Bruce Hicks was born in Orange, California. He worked as an actor, under the screen name, Randy Shepard, in small TV and film roles commencing in 1980: When Hell Was in Session (TV movie), Cutter's Way (film) and Escape! (network TV pilot). In 1982 he moved to Nice, France and worked as an English teacher, before returning to the United States to attend law school and commencing the practice of law in 1986, graduating from Pepperdine University School of Law.

== Legal career ==
Randall Hicks's legal career has been focused on adoption law and he has authored several books on that subject.

== Writing career ==
Hicks's first books were non-fiction on the subject of adoption. His first novel, The Baby Game, won the 2006 Gumshoe Award and was a finalist for the Anthony Award, Barry Award and Macavity Award (Best First Novel).

== Bibliography ==
=== Non-Fiction Books ===
- Adopting in California (1992)
- Adopting in California, Revised Edition (1999)
- ADOPTING IN AMERICA: How To Adopt Within One Year (five editions, 1992–2011)
- ADOPTION: The Essential Guide to Adopting Quickly and Safely (2007)
- STEP PARENTING: 50 One-Minute DOs & DON'Ts for Stepdads & Stepmoms (2016)

=== Fiction Books ===
- The Baby Game (2005)
- Baby Crimes (2007)

=== Children's books ===
- Adoption Stories for Young Children (1995)
