= Falcón (TV series) =

2012 crime television series

- Genre: Crime drama
- Created by: Robert Wilson
- Starring: Marton Csokas; Hayley Atwell; Charlie Creed-Miles; Santiago Cabrera; Emilia Fox; Kerry Fox; James Floyd
- Composer: Paul Leonard-Morgan
- Country of origin: United Kingdom
- Original language: English
- No. of series: 1
- No. of episodes: 4

Production
- Executive producers: Michele Buck; Rebecca Keane; Damien Timmer
- Producer: Julia Stannard
- Production locations: Seville, Spain
- Cinematography: Lula Carvalho; David Raedeker
- Running time: 180 minutes
- Production company: Mammoth Screen

Original release
- Network: Sky Atlantic
- Release: 15 November – 6 December 2012

Falcón is a crime drama television series based on the books by Robert Wilson, produced by Mammoth Screen for the Sky, Canal+ and ZDF channels. It starred Marton Csokas as Chief Inspector Javier Falcón.

== Cast and characters ==
- Marton Csokas as Chief Inspector Javier Falcón
- Hayley Atwell as Consuelo Jiménez
- Charlie Creed-Miles as Inspector Luis Ramírez
- Santiago Cabrera as Judge Esteban Calderón
- Emilia Fox as Inés Conde De Tejada, estranged wife of Javier
- Kerry Fox as Manuela Falcón, sister of Javier
- James Floyd as Rafa Falcón, nephew of Javier
- Natalia Tena as Christina Ferrera

== Production ==
Seville city of Spain for its stunning architecture and rich cultural history made it the perfect backdrop for the series. Ricardo Cruz Ardura, an acclaimed stunt co-ordinator, orchestrated the action sequences.

== Episodes ==
| No. | Title | Directed by | Written by | Original release date |
|---|---|---|---|---|
| 1 | "The Blind Man of Seville (part 1)" | Pete Travis | Stephen Butchard | 15 November 2012 |
A leading restaurateur is found bound, gagged and dead with self-inflicted wounds telling of his struggle to avoid the unendurable images he has been forced to watch. The investigation into his turbulent life sends Falcón trawling through his own past and the ferociously candid journals of his late father, a world famous artist. With Bernard Hill.
| 2 | "The Blind Man of Seville (part 2)" | Pete Travis | Stephen Butchard | 22 November 2012 |
Painful revelations churn up Falcón's unreliable memory and more killings, including his own nephew, again apparently self inflicted, push him to the edge of a terrifying truth about his own past and the death of his mother when he faces the killer who offers Falcón the chance to kill himself.
| 3 | "The Silent and the Damned (part 1)" | Gabriel Range | Sarah Phelps | 29 November 2012 |
Falcón returns to duty after three months to investigate the death of businessman Raphael Baena but is soon taken off the case when his superiors want it treated as non-suspicious, but the murder of a man tortured and with his tongue cut out are linked and events that took place 40 years ago in Pinochet's Chile put Falcón's life in danger. With Robert Lindsay, Kenneth Cranham, Bill Paterson.
| 4 | "The Silent and the Damned (part 2)" | Gabriel Range | Sarah Phelps | 6 December 2012 |
Falcón discovers hard evidence of CIA involvement in Pinochet's Chile and subsequent members of the Chilean government, now living in Seville under assumed names, are involved in a child sex ring. Believing he can trust ambitious Judge Calderon he gives him the evidence only for the judge to give it to a CIA agent. Falcón wants to arrest the last child sex ring member but his frustration that the cover up is complete is goaded by the man and he takes the law into his own hands.

== Reception ==
James Walton of The Telegraph was positive, remarking, 'this is a show that, depending on your mood, you could either find ridiculous or enjoy for its campy mix of classy direction and shameless self-importance. Personally I’d recommend doing both.'
