= Sharan Newman =

American novelist

- Born: April 15, 1949 (age 77); Ann Arbor, Michigan, U.S.
- Education: Antioch College; Michigan State University; University of California, Santa Barbara
- Occupations: Historian; writer
- Spouse: Paul Richard (m. 1971)
- Writing career
- Notable awards: Macavity Award (1994)

Sharan Newman (born April 15, 1949, in Ann Arbor, Michigan) is an American historian and writer of historical novels. She won the Macavity Award for Best First Mystery in 1994.

== Biography ==
Newman's father was a USAF captain; her mother was a psychologist. In 1971 she both graduated from Antioch College and married Paul Richard Newman, a physicist. She also gained a master's in medieval literature in 1973 from Michigan State University and then doctoral work in Medieval studies at the University of California at Santa Barbara. Newman lectures widely in medieval history and currently lives in Ireland.

== Writing ==
Newman's first novels were a historical trilogy about Guinevere. Then she turned to mystery novels set in 12th-century France featuring Catherine LeVendeur, a novice in a convent run by Heloise – though she later leaves and marries.

=== Awards ===
Newman's debut mystery, Death Comes as Epiphany, won the Macavity Award for "Best First Novel" in 1994 and was also nominated for the 1994 Anthony Award and the 1993 Agatha Award in the same category. The novel was also nominated for the 1994 Dilys Award for the mystery title of the year which the Independent Mystery Booksellers Association booksellers have most enjoyed selling. The Wandering Arm and Strong As Death also received nominations for Agatha Awards for "Best Novel" in 1995 and 1996 respectively.

== Bibliography ==
=== Guinevere series ===
- Guinevere (1981) ISBN 0-312-35318-9
- The Chessboard Queen (1983) ISBN 0-312-13176-3
- Guinevere Evermore (1985) ISBN 0-312-35322-7

=== Catherine LeVendeur series ===
- Death Comes as Epiphany (1993) ISBN 0-312-85419-6
  Macavity Award
- The Devil's Door (1994) ISBN 0-312-85420-X
- The Wandering Arm (1995) ISBN 0-312-85829-9
- Strong as Death (1996) ISBN 0-312-86179-6
- Cursed in the Blood (1998) ISBN 0-312-86567-8
  Herodotus Award for "Best US Historical Mystery"
- The Difficult Saint (1999) ISBN 0-312-86966-5
- To Wear the White Cloak (2000) ISBN 0-312-86965-7
- Heresy (2002) ISBN 0-765-30246-2
- The Outcast Dove (2003) ISBN 0-765-30377-9
- The Witch in the Well (2004) ISBN 0-765-30881-9

=== Other novels ===
- The Dagda's Harp (1976)
- The Shanghai Tunnel (2008)

=== Anthologies and collections ===
- Death Before Compline (2011)
- Home from America (Aug 2010) in Death's Excellent Vacation

=== Anthologies edited ===
- Crime Through Time (1997) (with Miriam Grace Monfredo) ISBN 0-425-15761-X
- Crime Through Time II (1998) (with Miriam Grace Monfredo) ISBN 0-425-16410-1
- Crime Through Time III (2000) (intro. Anne Perry) ISBN 0-425-17509-X

=== Non-fiction ===
- The Real History Behind the Da Vinci Code (2005) ISBN 0425200124
- The Real History Behind the Templars (2007) ISBN 978-0425215333
- The Real History of the End of the World (2010) ISBN 978-0425232538
- Defending the City of God (2014) ISBN 9781137437839
