= Mallory's Oracle =

1994 novel by Carol O'Connell

- First edition (UK)
- Author: Carol O'Connell
- Language: English
- Series: Kathleen Mallory
- Genre: Mystery
- Publisher: Hutchinson
- Publication date: May 1994
- Publication place: United States
- Media type: Print (hardback & paperback); Audio CD
- Pages: 282
- ISBN: 978-0-09-178638-0
- OCLC: 607265165
- Followed by: The Man Who Cast Two Shadows

Mallory's Oracle is the first novel in the Kathy Mallory series by author Carol O'Connell. The book was nominated for an Edgar Award and a Dilys Award. It was first published by Hutchinson in May 1994 in the UK, then in August that year by Putnam in the US.

== Plot ==
The series stars Kathleen Mallory, a policewoman who is 5 ft 10 in (178 cm) tall, blonde, beautiful, and green-eyed. She also has immense street and computer smarts. Her physical beauty masks a cold, amoral interior, however; O'Connell describes Mallory as a sociopath.

New York City police detective Louis Markowitz picks up an 11-year-old homeless street urchin for stealing. Instead of arresting her, he takes Kathleen Mallory home and raises her as his own. Mallory (as she likes to be called) still deals with issues from her traumatic childhood, but she has an undying love (or at least the closest thing she can manage to it) for her adopted parents. She follows Louis to the police academy and ends up in the special crimes unit, specializing in computer research.

Louis begins investigating the brutal murders of several older, wealthy women from Gramercy Park. While working alone and hot on the trail of this serial killer, he is murdered alongside another victim. Mallory takes it upon herself to take on this investigation (without police sanction, of course) and tries to piece together all the bits of information Louis had gathered. Louis trained Mallory well, but there is still the possibility that following his trail will cause Mallory to make the same mistakes he did, and lead to her becoming another victim.

Along the line, Mallory uncovers a complicated plot that deals with magic, séances, and insider trading.

== Reception ==
Ellen Datlow praised the novel as "an important suspense debut with a fascinating protagonist".
