= Live Bait (novel) =

2004 novel by P. J. Tracy

- First edition
- Author: P. J. Tracy
- Language: English
- Genre: Thriller, Crime, Mystery novel
- Publisher: G.P. Putnam's Sons
- Publication date: 2004
- Publication place: United States
- Media type: Print (Paperback)
- Pages: 362 pp (UK Hardback)
- ISBN: 0-7181-4586-0 (UK Hardback)
- OCLC: 56442492
- Preceded by: Monkeewrench
- Followed by: Dead Run

Live Bait is the second book by author P. J. Tracy. It follows on from her first book, Monkeewrench and has the same principal characters. This book starts with the death of an elderly man, which at closer inspection looks like an execution.

== Reception ==
Kirkus Reviews wrote of it: "Tracy returns in surprising detail to the idiosyncratic formula of her striking debut—Minneapolis cops and computer nerds battling the serial killer of a mysterious group of strangers—with more gravitas and more heartfelt revelations substituting for the wit, antic byplay, and originality of the prototype."

Publishers Weekly wrote: "With generous doses of humor and suspense, this sharp, satisfying thriller will rivet readers from the start."

Entertainment Weekly reviewed it with: "It doesn’t sound sexy, but 'Bait' is quick-witted and -paced, with a snappy plot that incorporates romance, gore, and a surprise ending. For those who mourn that Patricia Cornwell ain’t what she used to be, Tracy’s a wondrous discovery."
