= In the Bleak Midwinter (novel) =

2002 mystery novel by Julia Spencer-Fleming

In the Bleak Midwinter is a mystery novel written by Julia Spencer-Fleming. It was first published by St. Martin's Minotaur on March 25, 2002, and was her debut novel. It won six awards for best first novel, including the Agatha Award. The book introduced the characters of Clare Fergusson, an ex-Army helicopter pilot who has become an Episcopal priest and Russ Van Alstyne, a married police chief who lives in the same town.
