= Paula L. Woods =

American writer

Paula L. Woods (born 1953 in Los Angeles) is an African-American crime novelist and literary critic. Her 1999 novel, Inner City Blues, won the Macavity Award for best first mystery, and was followed by other novels featuring its heroine, L.A. policewoman Charlotte Justice. She has also edited an anthology of African-American crime literature and co-edited (with Felix H. Liddell) three anthologies of African American literature illustrated with African American fine art.

== Crime fiction novels ==
- Inner City Blues (1999)
- Stormy Weather (2001)
- Dirty Laundry (2003)
- Strange Bedfellows (2006) ISBN 0345457021

== Editor ==
- Spooks, Spies and Private Eyes: Black Mystery, Crime and Suspense Fiction of the 20th Century (1995)
- With Felix H. Liddell:
- Merry Christmas, Baby: A Christmas and Kwanzaa Treasury (1996)
- I Hear a Symphony: African Americans Celebrate Love (1994)
- I, Too, Sing America: The African American Book of Days (1992)
