= Nevada Barr =

American author

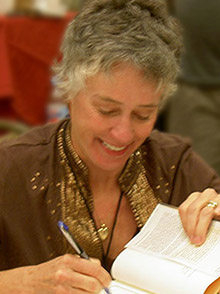
- Signing books at the 2006 Bouchercon World Mystery Convention in Madison, Wisconsin
- Born: March 1, 1952 (age 74); Yerington, Nevada, U.S.
- Education: California Polytechnic State University, San Luis Obispo; University of California, Irvine
- Occupation: Author
- Spouses: Richard Jones (m. 1998; div. 2006) Donald Paxton (m. 2007)
- Writing career
- Genre: Mystery novel
- Notable work: Track of the Cat
- Notable awards: Agatha Award, Anthony Award
- Website: www.nevadabarr.com

Nevada Barr (born March 1, 1952) is an American author of mystery fiction. She is known for her Anna Pigeon series, which is primarily set in a series of national parks and other protected areas of the United States. Barr's Anna Pigeon series has been interpreted into a television series starting in 2026 under the titular character's name.

== Early life ==
Although Barr was born in Yerington, Nevada, she was named not after her state of birth but after a character in one of her father's favorite books.

She grew up in Johnstonville, California, a place near Susanville, California in the far northern section of California, one of two daughters. Her parents ran a small airport in Susanville, where her mother was both a pilot and a mechanic.

In her teenage years she learned to pilot a plane from her mother. Barr received her bachelor's degree in speech and drama, and master's degree in acting at California Polytechnic State University, San Luis Obispo, in southern California. She finished her education at the University of California, Irvine.

== Artistic career ==
Barr trained in drama and was a professional actor on stage and in voice-overs for 18 years after receiving her master's degree at University of California, Irvine. She began writing in those years. She lived in New York City and Minneapolis and had a brief early marriage before moving to Clinton, Mississippi, to work as a Park Ranger and where she married her second husband.

When Barr's first husband changed careers from being a theatre director and became interested in the environmental movement, she began working as a seasonal park ranger in the summer at several National Parks. Her first permanent park ranger job was on the Natchez Trace Parkway in Mississippi. Barr began writing in earnest in 1978, when she was 26. Her first book, a historical romance titled Bittersweet, was published in 1984. Her first mystery novel, Track of the Cat, which introduced the character of Anna Pigeon, was published in 1993. It won two awards as a first novel.

Barr conceived of the Anna Pigeon character while working at her second seasonal job in Guadalupe Mountains National Park in Texas. Pigeon is a law enforcement ranger with the United States National Park Service. The first mystery novel became first in a series of books that take place in various national parks (and other protected areas), where Pigeon solves murders that are often related to natural resource issues. The Anna Pigeon character shares several similarities with Barr, such as working as a park ranger and having had a husband who worked in the theater in New York City.

Barr became a full-time writer when her books began to achieve commercial success.

== Personal life ==
While in her acting career, Barr had a brief first marriage. They were both in theatre. Her husband developed an interest in the physical environment and took a position in the National Park Service. This sparked a similar interest in Barr. She followed him and secured a position as a seasonal ranger at Isle Royal National Park. She then worked as a seasonal ranger at Guadalupe Mountains and then Mesa Verde. When her marriage ended she returned home to her mother in California. In 1994 she got a permanent position as a Park Ranger on the Natchez Trace Parkway in Mississippi. She was the first female law enforcement ranger to work on the Parkway.

She met her second husband, a second generation Park Ranger also working on The Trace. By this time she'd successfully started her Anna Pigeon mystery series based on a female Park Ranger and set in National Parks. In 1996, she also began painting. That year, her husband took an early retirement, and shortly after, Nevada resigned her position to write full time. With her husband assisting in research and acting as her personal assistant, she published a book a year until their divorce in 2006. Shortly after, she moved to New Orleans after her third marriage to Donald Paxton. She now lives with her husband in Oregon, where she continues to write and paint.

== Bibliography ==
=== Anna Pigeon series ===
- 1993 Track of the Cat (ISBN 0-399-13824-2)
  Guadalupe Mountains National Park
- 1994 A Superior Death (ISBN 0-399-13916-8)
  Isle Royale National Park
- 1995 Ill Wind (ISBN 0-399-14015-8)
  Mesa Verde National Park
- 1996 Firestorm (ISBN 0-399-14126-X)
  Lassen Volcanic National Park
- 1997 Endangered Species (ISBN 0-399-14246-0)
  Cumberland Island National Seashore
- 1998 Blind Descent (ISBN 0-399-14371-8)
  Carlsbad Caverns National Park
- 1999 Liberty Falling (ISBN 0-399-14459-5)
  Statue of Liberty National Monument
- 2000 Deep South (ISBN 0-399-14586-9)
  Natchez Trace Parkway
- 2001 Blood Lure (ISBN 0-399-14702-0)
  Glacier National Park
- 2002 Hunting Season (ISBN 0-399-14846-9)
  Natchez Trace Parkway
- 2003 Flashback (ISBN 0-399-14975-9)
  Dry Tortugas National Park
- 2004 High Country (ISBN 0-399-15144-3)
  Yosemite National Park
- 2005 Hard Truth (ISBN 0-399-15241-5)
  Rocky Mountain National Park
- 2008 Winter Study (ISBN 978-0-399-15458-4)
  Isle Royale National Park
- 2009 Borderline (ISBN 978-0-399-15569-7)
  Big Bend National Park
- 2010 Burn (ISBN 978-0-312-61456-0)
  New Orleans Jazz National Historical Park
- 2012 The Rope (ISBN 978-0-312-61457-7)
  Glen Canyon National Recreation Area
- 2014 Destroyer Angel (ISBN 978-0-312-61458-4)
  Superior National Forest
- 2016 Boar Island (ISBN 978-1-250-06469-1)
  Acadia National Park

=== Other books ===
Barr has published three other novels besides the Anna Pigeon series in addition to a non-fiction book:

- 1984 Bittersweet (ISBN 0-312-08244-4), a lesbian historical novel set on the Western frontier
- 2003 Seeking Enlightenment... Hat by Hat: A Skeptic's Guide to Religion (ISBN 0-399-15057-9), a memoir
- 2009 13 1/2 (ISBN 978-1-59315-553-7), a psychological thriller
- 2019 What Rose Forgot (ISBN 978-1-250-20713-5), a standalone thriller

== Awards ==
Barr's second novel, Track of the Cat, won the 1994 Anthony Award and Agatha Award for "Best First Novel". Her next novel, Superior Death, was nominated for the Dilys Award in 1995. Firestorm was nominated for the 1997 Anthony Award in the "Best Novel" category. Blind Descent was the next novel to receive attention from the mystery community, receiving a "Best Novel" nomination at the 1999 Anthony Awards, Dilys Awards and the Macavity Awards in the same year. Deep South, published in 2000, won the Barry Award for "Best Novel" and was again nominated for the Anthony Award in the same category.

In 2011, the National Parks Conservation Association honored Barr with the Robin W. Winks Award for Enhancing Public Understanding of National Parks. The award recognizes an individual or organization that has effectively communicated the values of the National Park System to the American public.
