= The Harrowing (novel) =

2006 horror novel by Alexandra Sokoloff

- First edition cover
- Author: Alexandra Sokoloff
- Publisher: St. Martin's Press
- Publication date: September 1, 2006
- ISBN: 0-312-35748-6

The Harrowing is a horror novel by American writer Alexandra Sokoloff. It was first published in 2006 by St. Martin's Press, and is the author's debut book, following a screenwriting career. According to Sokoloff's website, she was inspired to write the novel because of her experiences teaching to troubled teenagers in the Los Angeles County prison system. The Harrowing was nominated for the Bram Stoker Award for Best First Novel.

The story follows a group of five troubled teenagers, all college students, who decide to stay behind in their creepy dorm rather than go to their dysfunctional homes for the Thanksgiving holiday. But after playing around with a Ouija board they realize that there is a presence lurking in the house with them.
