= Yasmin Angoe =

Ghanaian American writer

- Occupation: Writer
- Writing career
- Notable work: Her Name is Knight (2021)

Yasmin Angoe is a Ghanaian American writer, known for her novel Her Name is Knight (2021), first of the Nena Knight series, published by Thomas & Mercer.

Her books have been optioned by Fifth Season for a television series, which is currently under development.

Prior to becoming a full-time writer, Angoe taught middle and high school English. She moved to South Carolina in 2009 and continues to live there with her husband and their family.
