= Murder on the Iditarod Trail =

1991 book written by Sue Henry

- First edition
- Author: Sue Henry
- Genre: Mystery fiction
- Published: 1991
- Publisher: Atlantic Monthly Press
- Pages: 278
- Awards: Anthony Award for Best First Novel (1992)
- ISBN: 978-0-380-71758-3 978-0-871-13440-0 (2015)
- OCLC: 972119507

Murder on the Iditarod Trail is a book written by Sue Henry and published by Atlantic Monthly Press in 1991, which later went on to win the Anthony Award for Best First Novel in 1992.
