= Scott Phillips (writer) =

American novelist

Scott Philips
- Born: 1961 (age 64–65); Wichita, Kansas, U.S.
- Occupations: Novelist, screenwriter

Scott Phillips (born 1961) is an American writer primarily of crime fiction in the noir tradition. He was born and raised in Wichita, Kansas. After co-writing and directing the independent short film Walking Blues, he lived for several years in France, working as a translator and photographer.

He returned to the United States and lived for a period in California, working as a screenwriter. He co-wrote a 1996 thriller called Crosscut, among many other projects, both credited and uncredited. He has sometimes been confused with another author of the same professional name.

His first novel, The Ice Harvest, was published in 2000. It won the California Book Award, as well as being nominated for the Edgar Award and Hammett Prize, and shortlisted for the Crime Writers' Association Gold Dagger Award. A black comic noir thriller set in the low-rent world of sleazy Wichita bars and strip clubs on Christmas Eve 1979, The Ice Harvest was adapted as a film of the same title, released in 2005.

He followed this in 2002 with The Walkaway, a combined prequel/sequel and spin-off to The Ice Harvest, set in Wichita during the 1940s and 1980s. His third novel, Cottonwood, set in Kansas and California during the Western era, was published in 2004.

Rut (2010) is a study of quirky characters in a post-apocalyptic Colorado. During the intervening years, Phillips published several well-received short stories. These were later collected and published with other fresh works in Rum, Sodomy, and False Eyelashes.

Phillips returned to Wichita as a setting for his next novel The Adjustment, in which he explored the snowballing petty corruption of a newly returned World War II veteran. '

Rake followed. It was first published in French and tells the story of a minor television star from the United States who finds greater fame in Paris. There he gets involved in a darkly comic tangle as he pursues women and a movie deal.

Hop Alley, a companion to Cottonwood, was next. Phillips was editor of and a contributor to the collection St. Louis Noir (2016).

His novel That Left Turn At Albuquerque, followed in 2020. It deals with art forgers, crooked lawyers, and the entertainment industry.

Most recently he published The Devil Raises His Own (2024). This furthers the saga of photographer Bil Ogden (Cottonwood, Hop Alley) as he becomes embroiled in pornography during the nascent days of Hollywood.

Phillips lives in St. Louis, Missouri, with his wife and daughter.

== Books ==
- The Ice Harvest (2000)
- The Walkaway (2002)
- Cottonwood (2004)
- Rut (2010)
- Rum, Sodomy, and False Eyelashes Short Story Collection (2011)
- The Adjustment (2012)
- Rake (2013)
- Hop Alley (2014)
- St. Louis Noir Editor/Contributor (2016)
- That Left Turn At Albuquerque (2020)
- The Devil Raises His Own (2024)
