= Retribution (Hoffman novel) =

2003 legal thriller novel by Jilliane Hoffman

- First edition (UK)
- Author: Jilliane Hoffman
- Language: English
- Genre: Thriller
- Publisher: G.P. Putnam's Sons (US); Michael Joseph (UK)
- Publication date: 2003
- Publication place: United States
- Media type: Print (hardback & paperback)
- Pages: 432 pp
- ISBN: 0-399-15127-3
- OCLC: 51878229
- Dewey Decimal: 813/.6 21
- LC Class: PS3608.O478 R48 2004
- Followed by: Last Witness

Retribution, a 2003 legal thriller, is the first novel by American author Jilliane Hoffman. After being published in 2003, it became a top-three bestseller in the USA and top 10 in Europe. This graphic serial killer/courtroom thriller puts its readers in a situation of choice between justice and retribution in its hardest form.
