= Officer Down (novel) =

Novel by Theresa Schwegel

- Author: Theresa Schwegel
- Language: English
- Genre: Crime fiction
- Publisher: Minotaur Books
- Publication date: 11 August 2005
- Publication place: United States
- Media type: Print (hardcover)
- Pages: 288 pp
- ISBN: 978-0312343149

Officer Down is the debut novel by crime writer Theresa Schwegel. It was published in 2005 by Minotaur Books and won the Edgar Award for Best First Novel.
