= Jilliane Hoffman =

American writer of legal thrillers

- Born: Long Island, New York, U.S.
- Education: St. John's University
- Occupation: Writer
- Children: 2
- Writing career
- Genre: Legal thriller
- Website: jillianehoffman.com

Jilliane Hoffman is an American writer of legal thrillers. She was born on Long Island and attended both undergraduate and law school at St. John's University in Queens, New York.

== Career ==
Before starting to write, Hoffman experienced the true life of a lawyer while working as an assistant state's attorney prosecuting felonies in Miami, Florida from 1992 to 1996. From 1996 to 2001, she was a regional advisor for the Florida Department of Law Enforcement consulting with special agents in complicated investigations including homicide, narcotics and organized crime.

With the knowledge obtained through years of work as a lawyer, Hoffman turned to writing legal/crime thrillers. Her first novel, Retribution, was published in 2004, followed by Last Witness in 2005. Her third book, Plea of Insanity, (originally scheduled for release in March 2007) was released in Europe in July 2008 and has been available in North America since April 2009.

== Personal ==
She lives in South Florida with her husband and two children.

== Works ==
=== C.J. Townsend books ===
1. Retribution (2004)
2. Last Witness (2005)
3. The Cutting Room (2012)
4. Nemesis (2019)

=== FBI Agent Bobby Dees series ===
- Pretty Little Things (2010)
- Insomnia (2017)

=== Standalone novels ===
- Plea of Insanity (2007)
- All the Little Pieces (2015)
