= The Expats =

2013 novel by Chris Pavone

- Author: Chris Pavone
- Genre: Thriller fiction, Mystery, Crime, Suspense
- Published: 2012
- Publisher: Crown Publishing Group
- Pages: 326
- Awards: Anthony Award for Best First Novel (2013), Edgar Award for Best First Novel (2013)
- ISBN: 978-0-307-95635-4
- Website: The Expats

The Expats is a novel by Chris Pavone which was originally published by Crown Publishing Group on 6 March 2012, and in 2013, won the Anthony Award and the Edgar Award for Best First Novel.
