= Prayers for the Assassin =

2006 novel by Robert Ferrigno

- Author: Robert Ferrigno
- Language: English
- Genre: Political, Thriller, Science fiction novel
- Publisher: Charles Scribner's Sons
- Publication date: February 2006
- Publication place: United States
- Media type: Print (hardcover)
- ISBN: 0-7432-7289-7
- OCLC: 61204461
- Dewey Decimal: 813/.54 22
- LC Class: PS3556.E7259 P73 2006

Prayers for the Assassin is a political thriller, and a work of speculative fiction, written by American crime writer Robert Ferrigno. The story is set in 2040, after economic strife and a pair of nuclear attacks have led to civil war, causing the United States to split into two hostile and competing nations: one a moderate Islamic republic with its capital in Seattle, the other a breakaway Christian Bible Belt built on the ashes of the former Confederacy and with its capital in Atlanta.

The hardcover edition of Prayers for the Assassin was published in the United States in February 2006 by Charles Scribner's Sons.

== Plot summary ==
In the backstory, nuclear terrorist attacks on New York City, Washington, DC, and Mecca are initially blamed on Muslim extremists, but the plotters are apprehended and confess to being Israeli agents, claiming that the attacks were a false flag meant to stoke anti-Islam sentiment. This results in a massive public backlash against Israel, and a mass conversion of the American populace to Islam. Much of the country adopts Islamic governance; a Christian minority breaks away to create a "Bible Belt" rump state.

The book opens with a scene from the "Second American Civil War" - a Muslim soldier dying in 2017, at the battle of Newark.

The narrative then moves to the Super Bowl in 2042 in Seattle, the capital of the new Islamic Republic of America (sometimes called the Islamic States of America). The nation's culture is a fusion of traditional American and Islamic: the Super Bowl is still played, but the cheerleaders are sword-wielding men and the participants break at half-time for afternoon prayers.

The Islamic Republic is facing a crisis, with competing political and religious factions threatening to tear it apart. Behind the scenes, a Mahdi figure known as the Wise Old One contrives to seize power for himself and to restore the Caliphate.

The story's protagonist is Rakkim Epps, a Muslim and a veteran of the Fedayeen, the Islamic Republic's elite special forces. Epps is in love with Sarah Dougan, a young historian and niece of the Islamic Republic's head of domestic security, Thomas "Redbeard" Dougan.

While researching the formation of the Islamic Republic, Sarah has discovered proof that it was in fact Muslim extremists working for the Wise Old One who launched the NYC and DC nuclear attacks. Sarah and Rakkim play a deadly cat-and-mouse game, attempting to stay ahead of the Old One's agents, particularly a sociopathic ex-Fedayeen assassin named Darwin Conklin.

Sarah and Rakkim are ultimately able to publicize the truth, and the book ends on an optimistic note that the factions of the Islamic Republic will be able to step back from the brink and find common ground.

In an epilogue, Rakkim confronts Darwin, killing him and almost dying in the process. He experiences a sense of religious peace and certainty, feeling the approval of an angel (Kiraman Katibin).

Prayers for the Assassin forms the first part of a trilogy. The sequels are Sins of the Assassin and Heart of the Assassin.

== The New America ==
In the early 21st century, nuclear suitcase bombs destroyed New York City and Washington D.C. and a dirty bomb irradiated Mecca. The attacks are blamed on Israeli agents; the resulting backlash and high-profile celebrity conversions lead to a large portion of the country converting to Islam. The United States is divided by a civil war.

Most of the country becomes a new Islamic Republic comprises the west coast, the southwest, the northeast and most of the midwest. Civil liberties are severely curtailed with the first and second amendments removed and a Wahabi/Talibanesque religious police called the Black Robes gaining more and more power.

Jews (blamed for the destruction of Washington and New York) are ostracized and Catholics have taken the role of second class citizens. The roads are falling apart, satellite communications are often down, and the I.R. lacks scientific growth, living off excess technology stored by the former United States. The U.S. military has advanced little, with modern technology the best it can produce, the main reason that the two main power countries Russia and China avoid an attack is the elite training of the Fedayeen corps. The Fedayeen are essentially the guards of the republic, mostly made up of converts and veterans of the civil war. They are loyal to the democratic Islamic government though they are constantly courted by the extremist Black Robes whose police force are bitter rivals of the Fedeyeen. Many landmarks and warships were renamed after Islamic figures, the best example being the USS Ronald Reagan renamed the USS Osama bin Laden or Seattle's football facility is called Khomeini Stadium. It is mentioned that the new government attempted to destroy Mount Rushmore, but gave up due to the sheer size of the monument.

The Bible Belt, a partially recognised separatist republic that comprises the old south plus Kentucky, Tennessee, Oklahoma, Texas, West Virginia, Virginia and most of Missouri disputed between itself and the Islamic State. After the transition millions of evangelical Christians immigrated here. Its government is thought to be much looser and decentralized, resembling the old Confederacy. The technology they possess is not made clear, although it is mentioned they have the only recipe for Coca-Cola.

Nevada is its own free state with a large and growing population, it serves exactly the same capacity as it does now.

The Mormon territories comprise Utah, plus parts of Colorado and Idaho. Little is mentioned about it. They may however not be a separate state, the map in the book (the UK version of the book does not contain a map) suggests they may just be an autonomous region within the Islamic Republic.

Parts of New Mexico, Arizona and Southern California have been claimed by the Aztlan Empire (formerly Mexico) and tension between the I.R. and A.E. have risen due to land claims.

Hawaii is described in the same context as Canada so could be independent. Alaska and the most Northerly New England States are not described.

Canada has snatched some of Minnesota and Wisconsin as "ancestral lands" for its native population.

Additionally, Southern Florida has become its own state, using a flag similar to Puerto Rico or Cuba.

The Islamic Republic has long been suffering an internal war between its moderate/modern wanting to preserve its democratic traditional government and fundamentalist factions wishing to create a fundamentalist Islamic State under the strict form Sharia law.

== Characters ==
- Rakkim Epps: The story's protagonist, a Muslim ex-Fedayeen shadow warrior, who is currently running a night club in Seattle's Christian Zone, where Muslims and Christians alike can commit illegal acts and businesses. He is hired to track down Sarah (his longtime love interest) by her uncle, when it is discovered that she has disappeared.
- Sarah Dougan: Rakkim's lover, a young college professor who attracts a great deal of controversy in her short career, having recently authored a book on the American's conversion to Islam which angered the country's fundamentalist population. While working on her latest book, one of her sources informs her to go into hiding because her work has attracted the attention of a mysterious figure who was behind her father's assassination.
- Thomas "Redbeard" Dougan: Sarah's uncle and head of the Department of State Security. He is seen as the constant target of the country's fundamentalist leaders, a true patriot of his country. He took in Rakkin while he was a young orphan; he also raised Sarah after his brother's assassination and her mother's mysterious disappearance. They had a falling out when Rakkim joined the Fedeyeen and were not on speaking terms after he refused to grant Rakkim's request to marry Sarah. With the disappearance of his niece and knowing that his rivals were closing in on him, he overcomes his estrangement with Rakkim and asks him to find Sarah.
- The Old One aka Hassan Muhammad: a terrorist mastermind responsible for the shaping of much of the current world. Although his actual age is unknown due to scientific procedures that help him live longer, he is estimated to be around 70–90 years old. Possibly a Yemeni who speaks his English with a British accent, presumably indicating where he received his education. He is the one who ordered the assassination of Sarah's father and discovers that her latest work could threaten to expose his life's work.
- Darwin Conklin: A psychopathic ex-Fedayeen assassin hired by the Old One to track down Sarah (despite being described by the Old One's son as a demon), he leaves a bloody trail of murders throughout his journey.
- Mullah Ibn Azziz: The new leader of the Blackrobes order, a young extremist who seeks to create a fundamentalist society cleansed of Catholics, Jews, and non-fundamentalist Muslims. He knows nothing of the Old One though his swift rise through the Blackrobes ranks was mostly due to him; when he discovers Sarah's disappearance he believes she is seeing a lover; he proposes to find her and use her to destabilize Redbeard's leadership.
- Angelina: Redbeard's loyal, kind-hearted house maid.
- Anthony Colarusso Sr.: A Catholic Seattle detective who is a good friend of Rakkim; also a former Catholic priest who now has a family of his own. His son Anthony Jr. is local hoodlum but hopes to join the Fedeyeen which his father encourages to help improve their social standing. Initially Rakkim refuses to give his recommendation, until he recognizes that he will better off in the Fedyeen than the streets, and agrees.
- Mardi: Rakkim's business partner at the night club, she's also the widow of Rakkim's Fedeyeen friend Tariq. She largely blames herself for his death, believing her refusal to convert cost him a promotion. Occasionally they sleep together though he stopped after he started seeing Sarah, which makes her a bit jealous.

== Marketing ==
Publisher Charles Scribner's Sons hired interactive design firm LevelTen Design to promote the book online through three websites, including one, "Republic World News", which was a fake news site for the "Islamic States of America". The Denver Post wrote, "With Prayers campaign of so-called "viral marketing" to generate buzz, instead of traditional advertising venues, could this be a new world order in the way books are sold?"
