= Robert Ferrigno =

American writer

- Born: 1947 (age 78–79); Florida, U.S.
- Occupation: Author
- Writing career
- Period: 1990–present
- Genre: Crime fiction

Robert Ferrigno (born 1947) is an American author of crime novels and of speculative fiction. Eight books published between 1990 and 2004 were additions to the detective and thriller genres, while the post 9/11 'Assassin trilogy' is set in an imagined United States dominated by Islam.

In February 2009 he was nominated as a finalist for an Edgar Award and has been reviewed by the Los Angeles Times and The New York Times for his book Prayers for the Assassin.

== Novels ==
- The Horse Latitudes (1990), his first
- Cheshire Moon (1993)
- Dead Man's Dance (1995)
- Dead Silent (1996)
- Heartbreaker (1999)
- Flinch (2001)
- Scavenger Hunt (2003)
- The Wake-Up (2004)
- Prayers for the Assassin (2006)
- Sins of the Assassin (2008)
- Heart of the Assassin (2009)
- The Girl Who Cried Wolf (2013)
