= Track of the Cat (novel) =

1993 book written by Nevada Barr

- First edition
- Author: Nevada Barr
- Genre: Mystery fiction, Thriller, Crime
- Published: 1993
- Publisher: G. P. Putnam's Sons
- Pages: 218
- Awards: Anthony Award for Best First Novel (1994)
- ISBN: 978-0-380-72164-1
- Website: Track of the Cat

Track of the Cat is a 1993 book written by Nevada Barr and published by G. P. Putnam's Sons. The book went on to win the Anthony Award for Best First Novel in 1994.

This first novel for author Barr features her character Anna Pigeon, and is the first of a series of novels with this character.
