= Roger Hobbs =

American novelist

- Born: June 10, 1988; Boston, Massachusetts, U.S.
- Died: November 14, 2016 (aged 28); Portland, Oregon, U.S.
- Education: Reed College, Conestoga High School
- Occupation: Author; www.rogerhobbs.com

Roger J. Hobbs (June 10, 1988 – November 14, 2016) was an American writer. He was the author of Ghostman and Vanishing Games. In 2011, Hobbs sold the adaptation rights to his crime fiction Ghostman to Warner Brothers. In 2014, Hobbs was nominated for the Edgar Award for Best First Novel by an American Author. Roger Hobbs died of a drug overdose in Portland, Oregon, on November 14, 2016.

- Hobbs, Roger (2013). Ghostman. Knopf Doubleday Publishing Group. ISBN 9780307950499.
- Hobbs, Roger (2015). Vanishing Games. Knopf Doubleday Publishing Group. ISBN 9780804170949.

• In Italia: Hobbs, Roger (2013) L'ombra. Einaudi. (2015) Pronti a svanire. Einaudi.
