= The Ice Harvest (novel) =

2000 novel by Scott Phillips

- 2000 Picador hardcover edition cover
- Author: Scott Phillips
- Language: English
- Genre: Crime, Mystery
- Publisher: Ballantine Books
- Publication date: October 2000
- Publication place: United States
- Media type: Print (Hardcover)
- Pages: 224 pp
- ISBN: 0-345-44018-8
- OCLC: 45125622
- Dewey Decimal: 813/.6 21
- LC Class: PS3566.H515 I25 2000
- Followed by: The Walkaway

The Ice Harvest is the debut novel of Scott Phillips. The story, set in 1979, was published to wide acclaim in 2000.

== Critical reception ==
Publishers Weekly called the book a "darkly delicious debut comic thriller." The New York Times called it "bitterly funny," writing that the crime genre "has found a sterling new champion in Phillips."

== Awards and nominations ==
- Silver Medal - First Work of Fiction, by the California Book Awards (for books published in 2000).
- It was shortlisted for the CWA Gold Dagger for best crime novel of 2001.

== Film, TV or theatrical adaptations ==
It was adapted into a film of the same name in 2005.

== Release details ==
- Phillips, Scott (October 2000). The Ice Harvest (Hardcover ed.). United States: Ballantine Books. ISBN 0-345-44018-8.
- Phillips, Scott (November 2000). The Ice Harvest (Hardcover ed.). United Kingdom: Picador. ISBN 0-330-48137-1.
- Phillips, Scott (November 2001). The Ice Harvest (Paperback ed.). United Kingdom: Picador. ISBN 0-330-48138-X.
