= Julia Spencer-Fleming =

American novelist of Mystery fiction (born 1961)

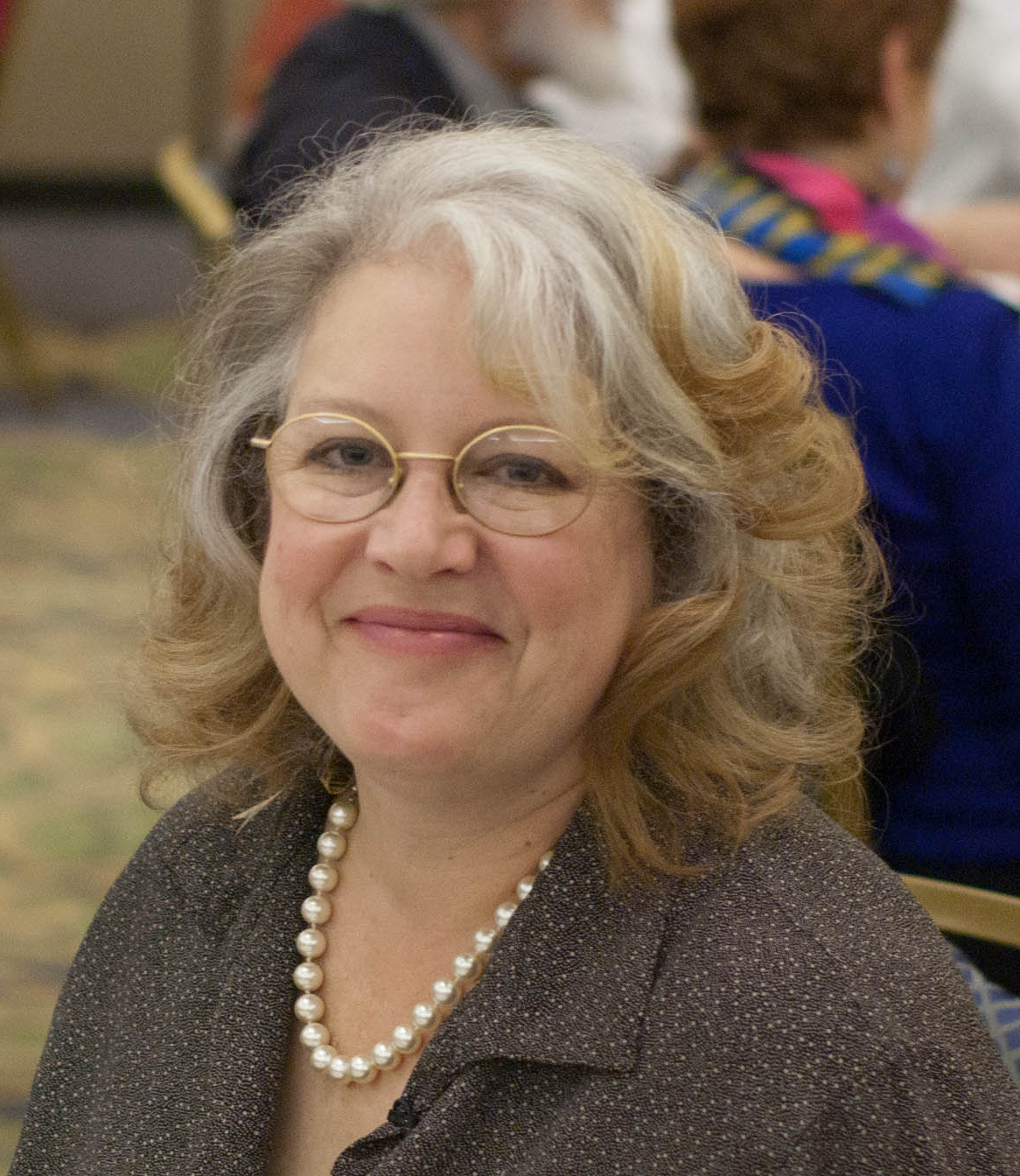
- Spencer-Fleming at the 2010 Virginia Festival of the Book
- Born: June 26, 1961 (age 64); Plattsburgh, New York, U.S.
- Education: Ithaca College; George Washington University; University of Maine (JD)
- Occupations: Writer, novelist

Julia Spencer-Fleming (born June 26, 1961) is an American novelist of mystery fiction. She has won the Agatha Award, Anthony Award, Macavity Award, Dilys Award, Barry Award, Nero Award, and Gumshoe Award. She has also been a finalist for the Edgar Award. Her books feature Clare Fergusson, a retired helicopter pilot turned Episcopal priest and Russ Van Alstyne, a police chief. They are set in Millers Kill, a fictional town in upstate New York.

Spencer-Fleming was born in Plattsburgh, New York and has degrees from Ithaca College, George Washington University and the University of Maine School of Law. Spencer-Fleming lives in Buxton, Maine.

== Bibliography ==
=== Rev. Clare Fergusson/Russ Van Alstyne series ===
1. In the Bleak Midwinter (2002, hardcover ISBN 978-0-312-98676-6, paperback ISBN 978-1250006516)
2. A Fountain Filled With Blood (2003, hardcover ISBN 978-0-312-99543-0, paperback ISBN 978-0-312-99543-0)
3. Out of the Deep I Cry (2004, hardcover ISBN 978-0-312-31262-6, paperback ISBN 978-0-312-98888-3)
4. To Darkness and To Death (2005, hardcover ISBN 978-0-312-33485-7, paperback ISBN 978-0-312-98887-6)
5. All Mortal Flesh (2006, hardcover ISBN 978-0-312-31264-0, paperback ISBN 978-0-312-93398-2)
6. I Shall Not Want (2008, hardcover ISBN 978-0-312-33487-1)
7. One Was A Soldier (2011, hardcover ISBN 978-0-312-33489-5)
8. Through the Evil Days (2013, hardcover ISBN 978-0-312-60684-8, paperbacks ISBN 978-1-472-20002-0 and ISBN 978-1-472-20000-6, audio 978-1-427-23104-8)
9. Hid from Our Eyes (2020, hardcover ISBN 9780312606855, paperbacks ISBN 978-1472210982 and ISBN 978-0312606886)
10. At Midnight Comes the Cry. Minotaur Books. 2025-11-18. ISBN 978-0-312-60686-2.

== Awards ==
- 2002 Agatha Award for In the Bleak Midwinter
- 2003 Anthony Award for In the Bleak Midwinter
- 2003 Macavity Award for In the Bleak Midwinter
- 2003 Dilys Award for In the Bleak Midwinter
- 2003 Barry Award for In the Bleak Midwinter
- 2007 Nero Award for All Mortal Flesh
- 2007 Gumshoe Award for All Mortal Flesh
