= Chris Pavone =

American novelist

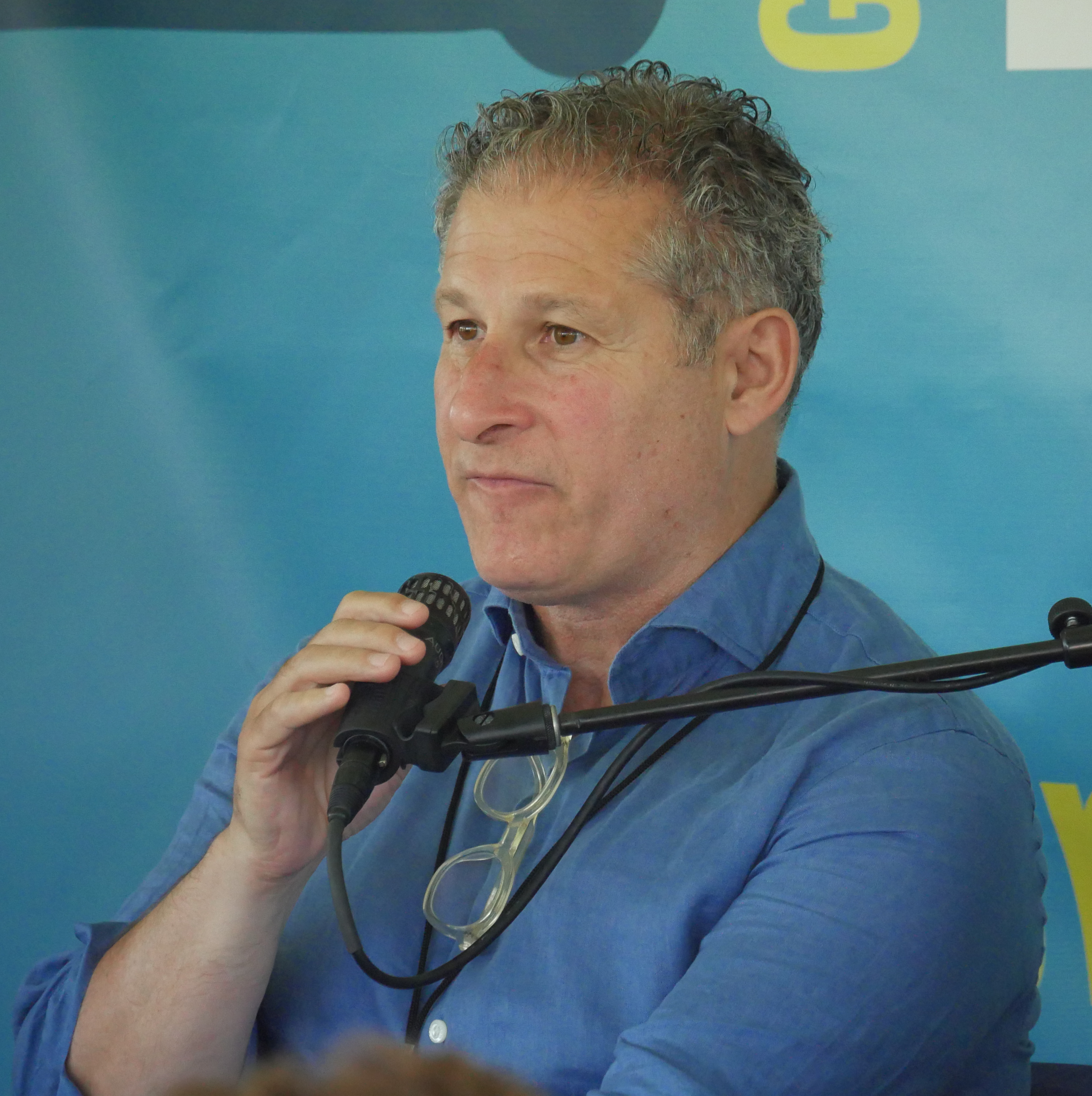
- Born: 1968 (age 57–58)
- Education: Cornell University
- Writing career
- Notable work: The Expats
- Notable awards: Edgar Award; Anthony Award
- Website: www.chrispavone.com

Chris Pavone (born 1968) is an American author. His first novel, The Expats, was a New York Times bestseller. His 2025 novel, The Doorman, was an AP bestseller.

== Background ==
Pavone attended Cornell University. Before writing his first novel, Pavone worked at a number of publishing houses as an editor. He lived briefly in Luxembourg with his family. He currently lives in New York City with his wife and his two children.

== The Expats ==
The Expats, Pavone's debut, was a New York Times bestseller. It was published in March 2012 by Crown. The Observer described the book as "expertly and intricately plotted, with a story spiralling into disaster and a satisfyingly huge amount of double crossing, [which] certainly doesn't feel like a first novel". The Expats won the 2013 Edgar Award for best first novel by an American author. It also won the 2013 Anthony Award for best first novel.

== Publications ==
- The Expats (Crown, 2012)
- The Accident (Crown, March 2014)
- The Travelers (Crown, March 2016)
- The Paris Diversion (Crown, May 2019)
- Two Nights in Lisbon (MCD, 2022)
- The Doorman (MCD, 2025)
