= Inner City Blues (novel) =

1999 debut novel by Paula L. Woods

- Author: Paula L. Woods
- Language: English language
- Series: Charlotte Justice
- Genre: Crime novel
- Publisher: W. W. Norton & Company
- Publication date: January 17, 1999
- Publication place: United States
- Media type: Print (Hardcover, Paperback)
- ISBN: 0-393-04680-X
- Followed by: Stormy Weather

Inner City Blues is the 1999 debut novel by American crime author Paula L. Woods, and the first book in her Charlotte Justice series. The book was published by W. W. Norton & Company on 17 January 1999, winning the Macavity Award for Best First Mystery in 2000 and being named Best First Novel by the Black Caucus of the American Library Association.

The novel takes place during the 1992 Los Angeles riots as Justice investigates the death of "one-time radical Cinque Lewis...who years before had murdered her husband and daughter."
