= Theresa Schwegel =

American author of crime fiction (born 1975)

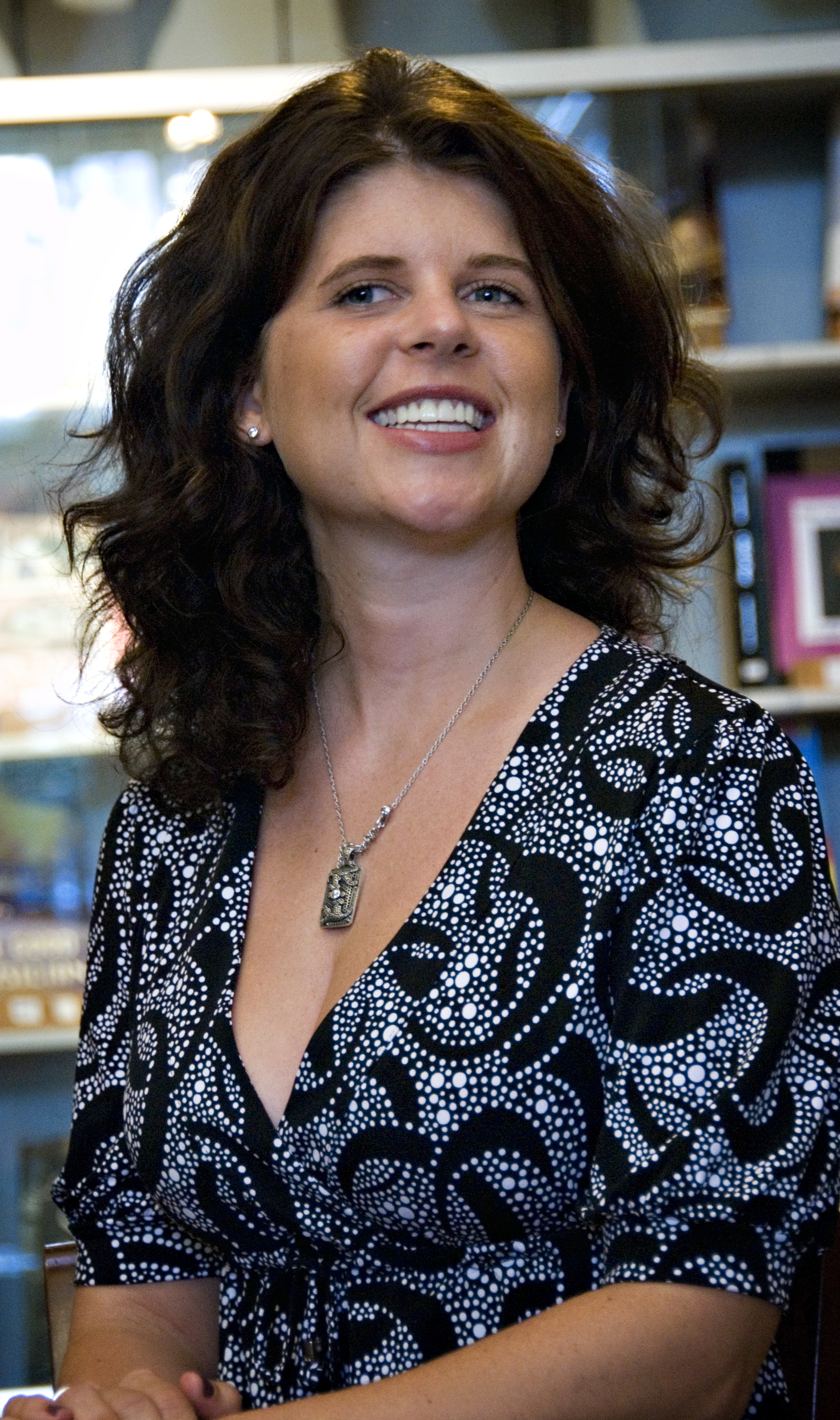
- Schwegel in 2009
- Born: July 20, 1975 (age 51); Algonquin, Illinois, U.S.
- Occupation: Novelist
- Writing career
- Period: 2005–present
- Notable works: Officer Down (2005); Person of Interest (2007)
- Notable awards: Edgar Award
- Website: www.theresaschwegel.com

Theresa Schwegel (born July 20, 1975) is an American writer of crime fiction. She won the Edgar Award for best first novel from the Mystery Writers of America for Officer Down in 2006. In 2008, she received the Chicago Public Library Foundation's 21st Century Award for achievement in writing by an author with ties to Chicago.

== Biography ==
Theresa Schwegel was born in Algonquin, Illinois, to Don and Joyce Schwegel. She attended Loyola University, where she graduated magna cum laude with a bachelor's degree in communication. After graduating, she took a job at a local television-commercial production company, which sparked her interest in the film industry. She later moved to Orange County, California, to attend the Graduate Film program at Chapman University as a screenwriting major. While in California, she wrote script coverage for a Hollywood production company. She also founded a local theater company in which she produced, directed, and acted in plays by David Mamet, among others.

Schwegel's first novel, Officer Down, began life as a screenplay. Searching for a subject for her Master's Thesis, she struck on a friend's account of an affair with a married police officer. Schwegel was both perplexed and fascinated by her friend's predicament: "I couldn’t reason with her; I couldn’t understand her. But I had to write about her. The mystery: how could someone so smart be so incredibly foolish?" Though Schwegel was primarily interested in exploring why an independent, intelligent woman would carry on an affair with an obviously untrustworthy man, her thesis advisor, Academy Award-nominated screenwriter Leonard Schrader, urged her to expand the law-enforcement angle of the story.

Using her friend's experience as a jumping-off point, Schwegel recast the story as a noir thriller, focusing on a hard-drinking beat cop—Samantha Mack—who discovers that her married lover—Detective Mason Imes—is a corrupt cop who is caught up in a drug ring. Developing the police-thriller aspect of the story necessitated heavy research into law enforcement and police culture. "The truth of the matter," Schwegel wrote later, was that "I was not a cop. I did not know any cops. I did not know anything about cops, with the exception of a few vague memories of the TV show “Crime Story.” I had no clue about procedure; I didn’t know the difference between a Sergeant and a Lieutenant." Through the course of rewriting both the screenplay and the novel versions of Officer Down, she immersed herself in the world of law enforcement. After selling the book, she wrote, "My proudest moment since St. Martin’s took on OFFICER DOWN was when my editor informed me that some people at the house asked if I was a cop."

Schwegel shopped the screenplay version of Officer Down to Hollywood, but quickly became disillusioned. "In my experience, Hollywood ranks spec scripts a few points lower than scratch paper. Even if you know someone who knows someone (which I did), the odds don’t fall in your favor." Schrader encouraged her to rewrite the story as a novel, and Schwegel warmed to the expanded possibilities the form offered, later explaining, "In screenwriting, you don’t write about the couch unless the hero has a gun tucked between the cushions and his nemesis has just taken a seat... In a novel, I can describe the couch. I can tell you that the hero thinks it’s comfortable. I can tell you the hero’s ex-wife insisted on buying the too-expensive couch and now the bad guy is sitting on it, he thinks of her—the woman who got him into this mess… and on and on. In other words, writing for the screen is an action blueprint; writing a novel is custom-building from the action."

Officer Down was published by St. Martin's Press in 2005, and won the Mystery Writers of America's Edgar Award for Best First Novel in 2006. Following the success of her debut, Schwegel has gone on to write a series of police thrillers, all set in the Chicago area and characterized by a gritty, unflinching sensibility. Of her predilection for "dark" stories, Schwegel has said, "I've always been a fan of noir, even in film school--the blacker the better for me. I just really am more interested in the underbelly, the underside of things." In 2008, she received the 21st Century Award for emerging Chicago-area writers, awarded annually by the Chicago Public Library Foundation.

In 2008, Schwegel relocated to Chicago. In addition to bringing her closer to her family (Algonquin is a short drive from Chicago), the move also served a practical purpose: "When I lived in California I’d return to Chicago and take photos so I could keep the images fresh," she later recalled. "It’s easier now that I’m in the city--all I have to do is look out the window." Her fifth novel, The Good Boy, was released in November, 2013.

== Works ==
=== Officer Down ===
Officer Down is narrated by police officer Samantha Mack. The story opens with Mack picking up a shift after being stood up by her married lover, Detective Mason Imes. Mack works the shift with her old partner, Fred Maloney; the two were formerly lovers, but Maloney is now married. After an awkward re-introduction, Fred takes them to meet with one of his snitches, who gives them a tip on the location of Marco Trovic. Trovic is a pedophile who Fred had arrested a few weeks earlier and who subsequently skipped bail. When Maloney and Mack arrive at the address provided by Fred's snitch, they are ambushed by a gunman, who kills Maloney and shoots Mack, knocking her unconscious. When Mack regains consciousness, she finds herself under the suspicion of an Internal Affairs officer named Alex O'Connor; the only fingerprints found at the scene were hers and Maloney's, which casts doubt on her story. Desperate to clear her name and bring Maloney's killer to justice, Mack launches her own investigation, but is stymied by O'Connor, her own Sergeant—and Imes, who increasingly seems to be more involved in Fred's death than Mack wants to believe.

- Schwegel developed the story of Officer Down after talking to a friend who had become romantically involved with a married police officer. "What interested me about the situation was that my friend was (is) a strong, rational woman, and he was able to tear her down completely," Schwegel says. "In writing this story, I wanted to understand the mechanics of manipulation. I wanted to know how this man could call my friend a whore and make her believe it."

=== Probable Cause ===
Probable Cause follows rookie cop Ray Weiss, a third-generation police officer newly assigned to Chicago's 20th District. Rookies in the 20th are expected to prove their loyalty by participating in petty robberies organized by the district's senior officers. The story opens with Jed Pagorski, Ray's best friend from the police academy, breaking into an electronics store under the supervision of his Field Training Officer (FTO), "Noise" Dubois. Ray's FTO, Jack Fiore, has scheduled Ray's initiation for the following night; the plan is for Ray and Fiore to break into a local jewelry story and steal a ruby ring for Fiore's wife. Although Ray fears that his father, Lieutenant Donald Weiss, would not approve, he feels he has no choice but to go along with Fiore's plan.

On the night of the robbery, however, Ray unexpectedly stumbles upon the corpse of the store's owner, Petras Ipolitas. Fiore quickly devises a cover story and coaches Ray on how to keep the homicide detectives from suspecting their involvement. The next day, Fiore announces that he has located a suspect in Ipolitas's killing—Jurgis Ambrozas, a small-time criminal who Fiore seems to have a grudge against. In the course of his interrogation, Ray begins to suspect that Ambrozas has been set up to take the fall for the murder. He brings his suspicions to Detective Sloane Pearson, the homicide officer assigned to the case. Although initially reluctant, Sloane agrees to help Ray investigate the case "off the books". When Fiore learns of this, he accuses Ray of disloyalty, and soon Jed and the other trainees begin pressuring Ray to drop his investigation. Ultimately, Ray is faced with a moral dilemma in which he must choose between adhering to Fiore's "code of silence," or following the example of his father and pursuing the truth, wherever it may lead.

=== Person of Interest ===
Leslie McHugh's marriage to Craig, an undercover cop in Chicago, is on the rocks because he's so distracted by his job, his other “life.” Her seventeen-year-old daughter is a real cop's kid and on a collision course with trouble, starting with her reckless boyfriend, Niko. Meanwhile, Leslie is lonely, bored, and starting to drink too much when she's home alone in the evening. When one thousand dollars goes missing from their bank account and Craig can't provide an explanation, Leslie takes matters into her own hands. She's determined to get to the truth and protect her family—no matter what the cost.

- Person of Interest garnered some of Schwegel's strongest reviews to date. New York Times critic Janet Maslin praised it as "a smart, propulsive, tightrope-walking mystery novel," noting that "Person of Interest calls for a delicate balancing act from Ms. Schwegel. She switches perspectives gracefully in order to convey the anger and estrangement of each member of the McHugh family. And she weaves a terrifically vigorous plot out of how their misapprehensions of one another lead them into danger." Entertainment Weekly's Ken Tucker gave the book an "A−", writing that Schwegel "creates a portrait of a family in crisis, and her vivid characterizations — stressed husband, yearning wife, floundering daughter — lift the thriller plot of Person of Interest to literary-novel status." Writing for the Chicago Tribune, Paul Goat Allen wrote, "Aside from the novel's gritty realism and intense emotional intimacy, the numerous thematic subtleties make this blend of police procedural and suspense thriller eminently readable... Person of Interest is an indisputable crime fiction tour de force."

=== Last Known Address ===
Detective Sloane Pearson, who previously appeared in Schwegel's Probable Cause, returns as the protagonist of Last Known Address. Sloane has recently been transferred to the Area Five Sex Crimes Division, following a homicide case in which one of her key witnesses was murdered. As one of the few female detectives in Area Five, she has faced great difficulty in winning the respect of her male colleagues, which has only reinforced her tendency to work alone.

As the story opens, Sloane is called to the home of Holly Dutcher, a real estate agent whom Sloane met briefly several weeks before. Dutcher has been raped by an unknown assailant, who dragged her into a vacant building and insisted that she “fight him.” The details match those of another case Sloane has been investigating, and she is convinced that Dutcher's assault is the work of a serial rapist. However, the previous victim, Claire Meyer-Davis, has stopped cooperating with the investigation, and Sloane's superiors are adamant that she close the case and move on. Sloane disregards her orders and continues looking into the case, leaking some details to a reporter at the Chicago Sun Times. Her investigation eventually leads her to the offices of a powerful real estate developer, Maurice Reyes, and her list of suspects broadens to include a host of Chicago's business and political elite.

Interspersed with the story of Sloane's investigation (told in third-person) are a series of first-person accounts from other victims of the same rapist. These women chose not to report their rapes, and are thus unknown to Sloane throughout the course of the main narrative. Their stories offer insight into why many victims of sexual assault choose to remain silent, as well as providing the reader with additional clues as to the identity of the rapist.

=== The Good Boy ===
Schwegel's most recent novel, The Good Boy, centers around Chicago K9 Officer Pete Murphy and his eleven-year-old son, Joel. Pete has been assigned to the K9 unit in the wake of a high-profile scandal involving Judge Katherine Crawford. Crawford had received death threats following two murders committed by a drug dealer she had released on bail, and Pete was assigned to protect her. The family of one of the murder victims attempted to sue the judge, and in the resulting media whirlwind, rumors began spreading that Pete and Crawford were having an affair. This led to Pete's dismissal from the protection detail and reassignment to the K9 unit, in addition to creating tension between him and his wife, Sarah. As the story opens, Pete impulsively pulls over car full of teenage gang-bangers, one of whom turns out to be Ja'Kobe White, the brother of one of the victims from the Crawford scandal. Ja'Kobe seizes on the incident to file a police-harassment lawsuit against Pete, which reignites the scandal and draws the ire of Pete's superiors.

Meanwhile, Joel Murphy, Pete's son, is feeling isolated and ignored by his family. His fourteen-year-old sister, McKenna, has become more interested in boys and gossip than spending time with her younger brother. One night, Joel overhears McKenna making plans to go to a party at the home of Zack Fowler, a neighborhood bully who has recently tormented Joel. Fearing for his sister's safety, Joel sneaks out of the house with his father's police dog, Butchie, and follows her to the party. When Butchie smells drugs coming from Fowler's back yard, he slips his leash and attacks one of the partygoers, which leads to the accidental shooting of another. Joel, fearing that the dog will be put to sleep (and that the partygoers will seek revenge), sets off across the city for the courthouse, where he hopes to plead for the dog's life. When Pete learns that his son is missing, he begins to suspect that Ja'Kobe is involved, leading him on an increasingly desperate investigation focused on the loose ends from the Crawford scandal.

== Personal life ==
Theresa Schwegel lives in Chicago, Illinois with her family.

== Bibliography ==
- The Lies We Tell (2017)
- The Good Boy (2013)
- Last Known Address (2009)
- Person of Interest (2007)
- Probable Cause (2006)
- Officer Down (2005)
