= Donna Andrews (author) =

American writer

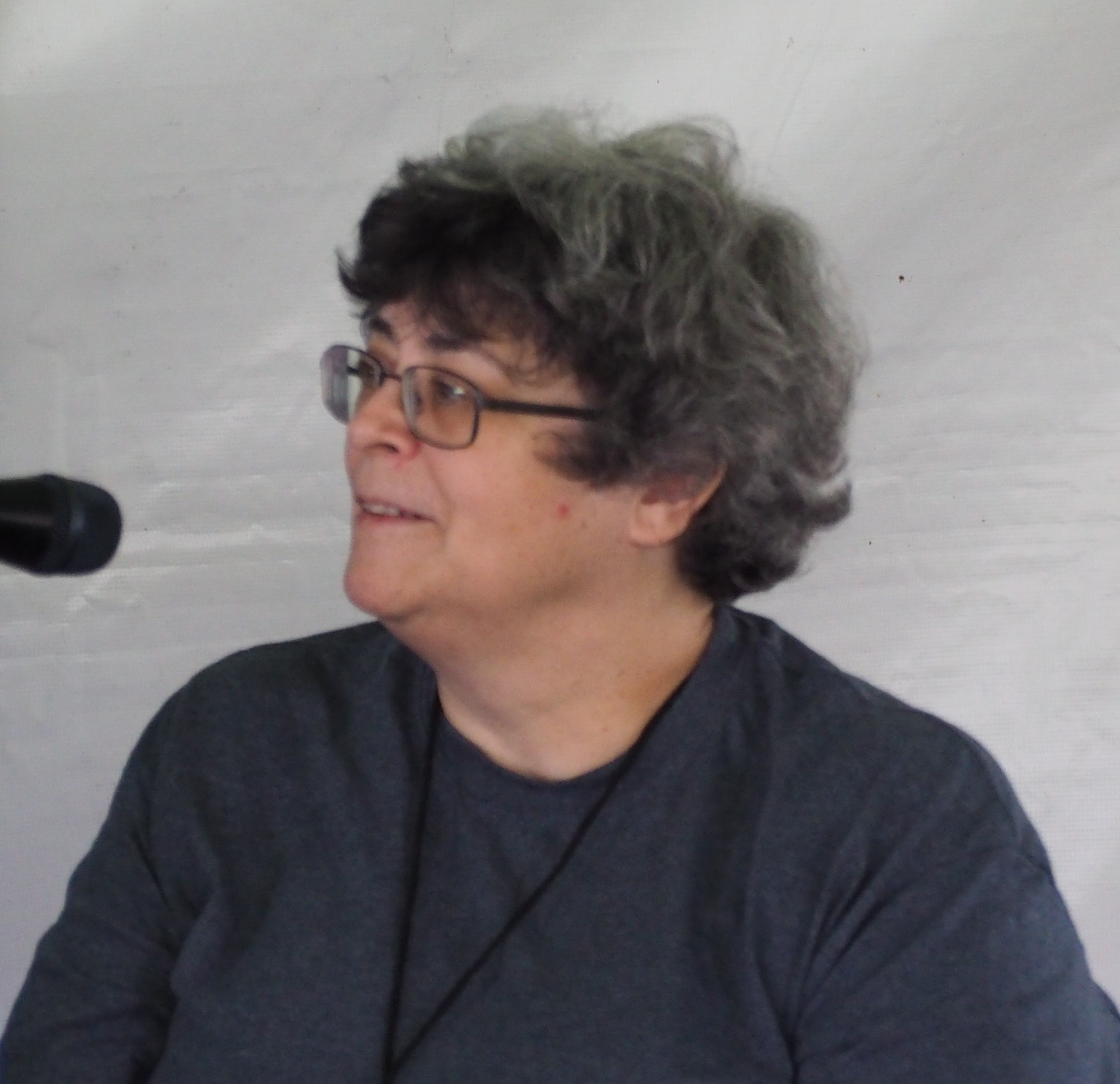
- Born: Yorktown, Virginia, U.S.
- Education: University of Virginia
- Occupation: Novelist
- Writing career
- Genre: Mystery
- Notable works: The Meg Langslow series The Turing Hopper series
- Website: donnaandrews.com

Donna Andrews is an American mystery fiction writer of two award-winning amateur sleuth series.

== Early life and education ==
Andrews was born in Yorktown, Virginia (the setting of her Meg Langslow series) and studied English and drama at the University of Virginia.

== Career ==
Her first book, Murder with Peacocks (1999), introduced Meg Langslow, a blacksmith from Yorktown, Virginia. It won the St. Martin's Minotaur Best First Traditional Mystery contest, the Agatha, Anthony, Barry, and Romantic Times Reviewers' Choice awards for best first novel, and the Lefty award for funniest mystery of 1999. The first novel in the Turing Hopper series, You've Got Murder (2002), debuted a highly unusual sleuth, an artificial intelligence (AI) personality who becomes sentient. It won the Agatha Award for best mystery that year. In 2026, The Mystery Writers of America named her a Grand Master.

== Personal life ==
Donna Andrews lives and works in Reston, Virginia.

== Bibliography ==
=== The Meg Langslow series ===
1. Murder with Peacocks (1999). ISBN 0312199295
2. Murder with Puffins (2000). ISBN 0312262213
3. Revenge of the Wrought Iron Flamingos (2001). ISBN 0312277296
4. Crouching Buzzard, Leaping Loon (2003). ISBN 0312277318
5. We'll Always Have Parrots (2004). ISBN 0312277326
6. Owls Well That Ends Well (2005). ISBN 0312329385
7. No Nest for the Wicket (2006). ISBN 978-0312329402
8. The Penguin Who Knew Too Much (2007). ISBN 978-0312329426
9. Cockatiels at Seven (2008). ISBN 978-0312377151
10. Six Geese A-Slaying (2009). ISBN 978-0312536107
11. Swan For The Money (2009). ISBN 978-0312377175
12. Stork Raving Mad (2010). ISBN 978-0312621193
13. The Real Macaw (2011). ISBN 978-0312621209
14. Some Like It Hawk (2012). ISBN 978-1250007506
15. The Hen of the Baskervilles (2013). ISBN 978-1250007513
16. Duck the Halls (2013). ISBN 978-1250028778
17. The Good, the Bad, and the Emus (2014). ISBN 978-1250009500
18. The Nightingale Before Christmas (2014). ISBN 978-1250049575
19. Lord of the Wings (2015). ISBN 978-1250049582
20. Die Like an Eagle (2016) ISBN 978-1250078551
21. Gone Gull (2017) ISBN 9781250078568
22. How the Finch Stole Christmas! (2017) ISBN 9781250115454
23. Toucan Keep a Secret (2018) ISBN 9781250115478
24. Lark! The Herald Angels Sing (2018) ISBN 9781250192943
25. Terns of Endearment (2019) ISBN 9781250192974
26. Owl Be Home For Christmas (2019) ISBN 978-1250305312
27. The Falcon Always Wings Twice (2020) ISBN 978-1250193001
28. Gift of the Magpie (2020) ISBN 9781250760135
29. Murder Most Fowl (2021) ISBN 9781250760166
30. The Twelve Jays of Christmas (2021) ISBN 9781250760180
31. Round Up the Usual Peacocks (2022) ISBN 9781250760203
32. Dashing Through the Snowbirds (2022) ISBN 9781250760227
33. Birder, She Wrote (2023) ISBN 9781250760241
34. Let It Crow! Let It Crow! Let It Crow! (2023) ISBN 9781250893963
35. Between a Flock and a Hard Place (2024) ISBN 9781250894083
36. Rockin' Around the Chickadee (2024) ISBN 9781250894359
37. For Duck's Sake (2025) ISBN 9781250894397
38. Five Golden Wings (2025) ISBN 9781250407313
39. Probable Caws (Aug 4, 2026) ISBN 9781250407320
40. Jay to the World (expected Oct 13, 2026) ISBN 9781250407382
- A Murder Hatched: collects the first two Meg Langslow novels. Released in 2009 by Macmillan, under its Minotaur/Thomas Dunne Books imprint.
- The Two Deadly Doves: collects two novels, Six Geese A-Slaying and Duck the Halls. Released in 2015 by Macmillan, under its Minotaur/Thomas Dunne Books imprint.

==== Meg Langslow short stories ====
- "A Christmas Rescue" in Two Deadly Doves (2015).
- "Night Shades" in Chesapeake Crimes (2004).
- "Birthday Dinner" in Death Dines In, Claudia Bishop and Dean James, editors (2004).

=== The Turing Hopper series ===
- You've Got Murder (2002). ISBN 042518191X
- Click Here for Murder (2003). ISBN 0425188566
- Access Denied (2004). ISBN 0425198383
- Delete All Suspects (2005). ISBN 042520569X

=== Short stories ===
- "When Even Waffle House Closes" in Scattered, Smothered, Covered & Chunked: Crime Fiction Inspired by Waffle House, (October 2024)
- "The Grim" in Black Cat Weekly #165 (October 2024)
- "Not Another Secret Passage Story" in School of Hard Knox, (August 2023)
- "Something Dark and Dangerous" in Chesapeake Crimes: Magic Is Murder , (August 2022)
- "A Night at the Opera" in Monkey Business: Crime Fiction Inspired by the Films of the Marx Brothers, (September 2021)
- "Cold Blue Steel and Sweet Fire" in The Beat of Black Wings: Crime Fiction Inspired by the Songs of Joni Mitchell, (April 2020)
- "The Last Caving Trip" in Storm Warning: Chesapeake Crimes 7, (April 2016)
- "A Christmas Trifle" in Homicidal Holidays: Chesapeake Crimes 6, (September 2014)
- "Mean Girls" in This Job Is Murder: Chesapeake Crimes 5, (May 2012)
- "Normal" in Ellery Queen's Mystery Magazine, May 2011
- "The Plan" in Chesapeake Crimes 4: They Had It Comin' (2010)
- "Spellbound" in Unusual Suspects, Dana Stabenow, editor (2008)
- "The Haire of the Beast" in Wolfsbane and Mistletoe, edited by Charlaine Harris and Toni L.P. Kelner (2008)
- "A Rat's Tale" in Ellery Queen's Mystery Magazine, September–October 2007
- "Cold Spell" in Powers of Detection, Dana Stabenow, editor (2004)
- "An Unkindness of Ravens" in The Mysterious North, Dana Stabenow, editor (2002)

== Awards ==
Donna Andrews has won many industry awards for her fiction. As of 2024 she has earned 3 Agatha Awards, 1 Anthony Award, 1 Barry Award, 4 Lefty Awards, 2 Toby Bromberg Awards and 1 Romantic Times Reviewers' Choice Award. Andrews has also been nominated for 3 Dilys Awards.

'Murder with Peacocks'

- 1999 Agatha Award for Best First Novel
- 2000 Anthony Award for Best First Novel
- 2000 Barry Award for Best First Novel
- 2000 Lefty Award
- 2000 Finalist for Dilys Award
- 1999 Romantic Times Reviewers' Choice Award for Best First Mystery

'Revenge of the Wrought Iron Flamingos'

- 2009 Lefty Award nomination

'You've Got Murder'

- 2002 Agatha Award for Best Novel
- 2003 Finalist for Dilys Award

'Crouching Buzzard, Leaping Loon'

- 2003 Agatha Award nomination for Best Novel
- 2003 Toby Bromberg Award for Most Humorous Mystery
- 2004 Finalist for Dilys Award
- 2004 Lefty Award nomination

'We'll Always Have Parrots'

- 2004 Agatha Award nomination for Best Novel
- 2005 Lefty Award

'Owl's Well That Ends Well'

- 2005 Agatha Award nomination for Best Novel

'No Nest for the Wicket'

- 2007 Lefty Award nomination

'The Penguin Who Knew Too Much'

- 2007 Agatha Award nomination for Best Novel
- 2008 Lefty Award nomination

"A Rat's Tale", Ellery Queen Mystery Magazine – Sept/Oct. 2007

- 2007 Agatha Award for Best Short Story

'Six Geese A-Slaying'

- 2008 Agatha Award nomination for Best Novel
- 2009 Lefty Award nomination

'Swan For the Money'

- 2009 Agatha Award nomination for Best Novel
- 2009 Toby Bromberg Award for Most Humorous Mystery
- 2010 Lefty Award nomination

'Stork Raving Mad'

- 2010 Agatha Award nomination for Best Novel
- 2011 Lefty Award nomination

'The Real Macaw'

- 2011 Agatha Award nomination for Best Novel
- 2012 Lefty Award

'The Good, the Bad, and the Emus'

- 2014 Agatha Award nomination for Best Contemporary Novel

' Lord of the Wings '

- 2016 Lefty Award for Best Humorous Mystery Novel

'Die Like an Eagle'

- 2017 Lefty Award nomination for Best Humorous Mystery Novel

'Gone Gull'

- 2018 Lefty Award nomination for Best Humorous Mystery Novel

'The Gift of the Magpie'

- 2020 Agatha Award nomination for Best Contemporary Novel

'School of Hard Knox'

- 2024 Anthony Award nomination for Best Anthology

== Professional memberships ==
- Sisters in Crime (Chesapeake Chapter)
- Mystery Writers of America (Mid-Atlantic chapter)
- Private Investigators and Security Association
