= P. J. Tracy =

American pseudonymous novelist duo

- Writing career
- Genres: Mysteries & Thrillers
- Notable work: The Monkeewrench Series
- Website: pjtracy.com

P. J. Tracy is a pseudonym for American mother-daughter writing team Patricia (P. J.) (b. 1946 d. Stillwater December 21, 2016) and Traci Lambrecht, winners of the Anthony, Barry, Gumshoe, and Minnesota Book Awards. Their ten mystery thrillers include Monkeewrench (published as Want to Play? in the UK), Live Bait, Dead Run, Snow Blind, Shoot to Thrill (published as Play to Kill in the UK), Off the Grid, The Sixth Idea (published a Cold Kill in the UK), Nothing Stays Buried, The Guilty Dead, and Ice Cold Heart. They also published Return of the Magi, a quirky Christmas novella, as an ebook. After Patricia Lambrecht died in 2016, Traci Lambrecht continued to write under the P. J. Tracy pseudonym.

== Novels ==
Monkeewrench Series

- Monkeewrench (2003) ISBN 0399149783 (UK title: Want To Play?)
  - Won 2004 Barry Award for Best First Mystery Novel
- Live Bait (2004) ISBN 0399151478
- Dead Run (2005) ISBN 0399152466
- Snow Blind (2006) ISBN 978-0399153396
- Shoot to Thrill (2010) ISBN 978-0399155208 (UK title: Play to Kill)
- Off the Grid (2012) ISBN 978-0399158049 (UK title: Two Evils)
- The Sixth Idea (2016) ISBN 978-0399169359 (UK title: Cold Kill)
- Nothing Stays Buried (2017) ISBN 978-0735212459
- The Guilty Dead (2018) ISBN 978-1683318583
- Ice Cold Heart (2020) ISBN 978-1643851327

Detective Margaret Nolan series

- Deep into the Dark (2021) ISBN 9781250754943

Standalone

- Return of the Magi (2017) ISBN 9781405934534
