= Alexandra Sokoloff =

American novelist

- Born: California, U.S.
- Education: University of California, Berkeley (BA)
- Occupations: Novelist; screenwriter
- Spouse: Craig Robertson
- Writing career
- Genres: Horror; thriller; crime fiction
- Notable awards: Thriller Award for Best Short Story (2009)
- Website: alexandrasokoloff.com

Alexandra Sokoloff is an American novelist and screenwriter who splits her time between Raleigh, North Carolina, and Los Angeles. Her books often concern paranormal phenomena, such as spirit hauntings.

Her debut novel, the ghost story The Harrowing, was nominated for a Bram Stoker Award for Best Novel, as well as an Anthony Award for Best First Novel. Her short story "The Edge of Seventeen" won the 2009 Thriller Award for Best Short Story. She is also well-known as the author of the Huntress/FBI series (2014–2019), which follows an FBI Special Agent, who is trying to catch a female serial killer and later is haunted by a ghost. The six books include Huntress Moon, Blood Moon, and Cold Moon; they're published by Thomas & Mercer.

== Career ==
Sokoloff started her career in theater. A native of Berkeley, California, she graduated from University of California, Berkeley, majoring in it. She subsequently wrote and performed with an improvisational theater group in the San Francisco area.

After college she moved to Los Angeles, where she first worked in the Los Angeles County prison system as a teacher of juvenile detainees — male gang members and young women prostitutes. This experience later informed her vision for novels like Hunger Moon (2017), a work in which human trafficking of young women is a significant theme. She then made a living with novel adaptations, and sold original thriller scripts to various Hollywood studios, like Sony and Fox.

She wrote original suspense and horror screenplays and adapted novels for studios including Sony, Fox, Disney and Miramax. With Kimball Greenough and Thomas Reuter, she co-wrote Kalte Küsse, an adaptation of Sabine Deitmer's novel Cold Kisses, which was released in Germany in 1997.

=== Literary work ===
Her first novel, The Harrowing, was published by St. Martin's Press in 2006. The novel follows a group of five ivy-league type freshman at college, who end up riling a ghost that's lived in their dormitory for a century when they mess with a Ouija board. The event unfolds during Thanksgiving break, a time when everyone else is home. The five "strays" who stay in the mansion-turned-dormitory over the long weekend, including lonely and isolat protagonist Robin, each with wildly differing personalities, must "form bonds and alliances under the pressure of surviving," in spite of their "behavior, stem[ming] from their inadequacies, real or perceived." It received acclaim, was reviewed at the time or retrospectively by a variety of outlets, was nominated for multiple major awards, and cemented Sokoloff as a new writer to watch. Originally discussed in an issue of 2006, and posted in 2010 online, Kirkus summed it up as "a little scary, a lot silly, boast[ing] the big-screen virtues of quick pace and an engaging plot;" however, "in the end, it reads more like young-adult fare than a book for grownups." They also noted that her overuse of movie tropes betray her screenwriter sensibilities with soundstage in mind. Another review by Publishers Weekly called the book "a teen terror flick in prose" and found the characters boring and annoying, saying that one of them, the nerd archetype, projects a "skepticism [that] grows increasingly grating with each repeat expression," and that as for the rest, they "develop little personality outside of their carefully crafted types." Continuing, "the pyrotechnic climax, in which the kids prove unusually adept at occult subterfuge, stretches credibility", but on the other hand it "provides a suitably cinematic finale."

Her second novel, The Price, was published by St. Martin's in 2007; her third, The Unseen, in 2009; and her fourth, Book of Shadows, in 2010.

She co-wrote the paranormal mystery romance series The Keepers and the screenplay for the psychological thriller Cold Kisses. She also has co-written two books on story structure, Story Structure and Writing Love, based on her Screenwriting Tricks for Authors workshops and blog.

Her most recent novel efforts involve the fictional FBI Special Agent Matthew Roarke as he attempts to track down a female serial killer named Cara Lindstrom. The first novel in the series, Huntress Moon (2014), to some, "introduced something new to the field that left an impact close to the one chewed out by Hannibal Lecter," because "the concept of a female serial killer was a unique one" in the genre at the time of publication.

== Style ==
In a discussion about The Harrowing, SFFWorld said the author "writes camera-ready prose – concise, direct, visual – so that [their work] proceeds somewhat like a movie, in well-realized scenes giving a sense of a camera following [characters]," like a screenwriter would in a script.

== Personal life ==
Sokoloff is married to Scottish crime writer Craig Robertson. She divides her time between Los Angeles and Scotland.

== Awards and nominations ==
Year	Award	Category	Work	Result
2006	Bram Stoker Award	Best First Novel	The Harrowing	Nominated
2007	Anthony Award	Best First Novel	The Harrowing	Nominated
2009	Thriller Award	Best Short Story	"The Edge of Seventeen"	Won
2013	Thriller Award	Best E-book Original Novel	Huntress Moon	Nominated

== Bibliography ==
=== Standalone novels ===
- The Harrowing (2006)
- The Price (2008)
- The Unseen (2009)
- Book of Shadows (2010)
- Goddess of Fate (2015)

=== The Keepers Universe ===
- The Keepers
  - 2 The Shifters (2010)
- The Keepers: L.A.
  - 3 Keeper of the Shadows (2013)

=== Huntress/FBI thrillers ===
1. Huntress Moon (2014)
2. Blood Moon (2015)
3. Cold Moon (2015)
4. Bitter Moon (2016)
5. Hunger Moon (2017)
6. Shadow Moon (2019)
