= Monkeewrench =

Novel by P. J. Tracy

- First edition
- Author: P. J. Tracy
- Language: English
- Genre: Thriller, crime, mystery
- Publisher: G.P. Putnam's Sons (US)
- Publication date: 2003
- Publication place: United States
- Media type: Print (paperback)
- Pages: 454 pp (UK paperback)
- ISBN: 0-14-101132-7 (UK Paperback)
- OCLC: 56455902
- Followed by: Live Bait

Monkeewrench (released later in the United Kingdom as Want to Play?), is the first novel by author team P. J. Tracy. It revolves around the search for a copycat killer, who is recreating murders found in a new computer game. It also seems that the killer is linked to the computer programmers who made the game.

This book was featured on the UK Richard & Judy show in 2005.

== Reception ==
Kirkus Reviews called it a "preposterous, entertaining nailbiter." Publishers Weekly wrote it had "an accelerating, unpredictable plot that combines police procedural with techno-geek-speak, an array of well-drawn characters and, most importantly, witty repartee." Entertainment Weekly praised it: "From the well-drawn, intelligent characters to the perfect pacing, Monkeewrench is that rare mystery that stays ahead of the reader."
