= Barry Award (crime novel prize) =

Award for crime writing

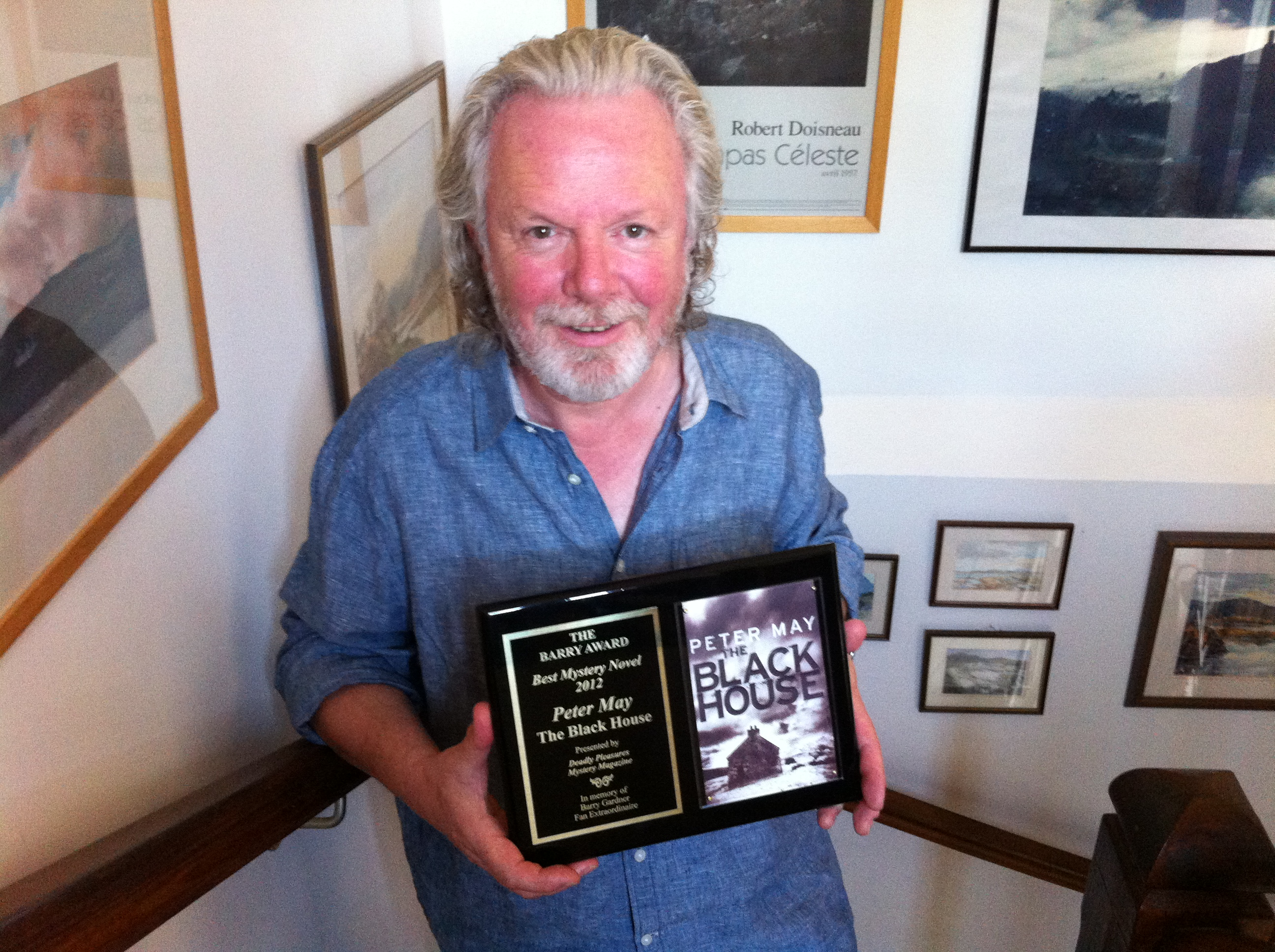
Peter May with the 2013 Barry Award for Novel, for his book, "The Blackhouse".

The Barry Award is a crime literary prize awarded annually since 1997 by the editors of Deadly Pleasures, an American quarterly publication for crime fiction readers. From 2007 to 2009 the award was jointly presented with the publication Mystery News. The prize is named after Barry Gardner, an American critic.

== Winners ==
=== Best Mystery/Crime Novel of the Decade ===
Barry Award for Best Mystery/Crime Novel of the Decade
Year	Author	Title	Result	Ref.
2010	Stieg Larsson	The Girl with the Dragon Tattoo	Winner	
2010	Ken Bruen	The Guards	Finalist	
2010	Michael Connelly	The Lincoln Lawyer	Finalist	
2010	Dennis Lehane	Mystic River	Finalist	
2010	Louise Penny	Still Life	Finalist	
2010	Carlos Ruiz Zafón	The Shadow of the Wind	Finalist	
2020	Robert Crais	Suspect	Winner	
2020	Lou Berney	November Road	Finalist	
2020	Gillian Flynn	Gone Girl	Finalist	
2020	Jane Harper	The Dry	Finalist	
2020	Peter May	The Blackhouse	Finalist	
2020	Don Winslow	The Border	Finalist	

=== Best British Crime Novel ===
The "British Crime Novel" in this context is best crime fiction novel first published in English in the United Kingdom and does not reflect the author's nationality.

Barry Award for Best British Crime Novel
Year	Author	Title	Result	Ref.
2000	Val McDermid	A Place of Execution	Winner	
2000	Rennie Airth	River of Darkness	Finalist	
2000	John Connolly	Every Dead Thing	Finalist	
2000	Colin Falconer	Rough Justice	Finalist	
2000	Barry Maitland	The Chalon Heads	Finalist	
2001	Stephen Booth	Black Dog	Winner	
2001	John Connolly	Dark Hollow	Finalist	
2001	Sarah Diamond	The Beach Road	Finalist	
2001	Colin Falconer	The Certainty of Doing Evil	Finalist	
2001	Peter Lovesey	The Reaper	Finalist	
2002	Stephen Booth	Dancing with the Virgins	Winner	
2002	Caroline Carver	Blood Junction	Finalist	
2002	John Connolly	The Killing Kind	Finalist	
2002	Reginald Hill	Dialogues of the Dead	Finalist	
2002	P. D. James	Death in Holy Orders	Finalist	
2002	Val McDermid	Killing the Shadows	Finalist	
2002	Ian Rankin	The Falls	Finalist	
2003	John Connolly	The White Road	Winner	
2003	Mark Billingham	Scaredy Cat	Finalist	
2003	Tom Bradby	The Master of Rain	Finalist	
2003	Simon Kernick	The Business of Dying	Finalist	
2003	Peter Lovesey	Diamond Dust	Finalist	
2003	Ed O'Connor	The Yeare’s Midnight	Finalist	
2004	Val McDermid	The Distant Echo	Winner	
2004	Mark Billingham	Lazybones	Finalist	
2004	Christopher Fowler	Full Dark House	Finalist	
2004	Simon Kernick	The Murder Exchange	Finalist	
2004	Peter Lovesey	The House Sitter	Finalist	
2004	Andrew Taylor	The American Boy (An Unpardonable Crime)	Finalist	
2005	John Harvey	Flesh & Blood	Winner	
2005	Mark Billingham	The Burning Girl	Finalist	
2005	Ken Bruen	The Dramatist	Finalist	
2005	Mo Hayder	Tokyo (The Devil of Nanking)	Finalist	
2005	Simon Kernick	The Crime Trade	Finalist	
2005	Zoë Sharp	First Drop	Finalist	
2006	Denise Mina	Field of Blood	Winner	
2006	Rennie Airth	The Blood-Dimmed Tide	Finalist	
2006	Mark Billingham	Lifeless	Finalist	
2006	Arnaldur Indridason	Silence of the Grave	Finalist	
2006	Simon Kernick	A Good Day to Die	Finalist	
2006	Michael Robotham	Lost	Finalist	
2007	Ken Bruen	Priest	Winner	
2007	Stuart MacBride	Dying Light	Finalist	
2007	C. J. Sansom	Sovereign	Finalist	
2007	Nick Stone	Mr. Clarinet	Finalist	
2007	Edward Wright	Red Sky Lament	Finalist	
2008	Edward Wright	Damnation Falls	Winner	
2008	R. J. Ellory	A Quiet Belief In Angels	Finalist	
2008	Mo Hayder	Pig Island	Finalist	
2008	Graham Hurley	One Under	Finalist	
2008	Paul Johnston	The Death List	Finalist	
2008	Steve Mosby	The 50/50 Killer	Finalist	
2009	Stieg Larsson	The Girl with the Dragon Tattoo	Winner	
2009	R. J. Ellory	A Simple Act of Violence	Finalist	
2009	Mo Hayder	Ritual	Finalist	
2009	Michael Robotham	Shatter	Finalist	
2009	Andrew Taylor	Bleeding Heart Square	Finalist	
2009	Martin Walker	Bruno, Chief of Police	Finalist	
2010	Philip Kerr	If the Dead Rise Not	Winner	
2010	S. J. Bolton	Awakening	Finalist	
2010	John Connolly	The Lovers	Finalist	
2010	Reginald Hill	Midnight Fugue	Finalist	
2010	Denise Mina	Still Midnight	Finalist	
2010	Robert Wilson	The Ignorance of Blood	Finalist	
2011	Reginald Hill	The Woodcutter	Winner	
2011	Kate Atkinson	Started Early, Took My Dog	Finalist	
2011	S. J. Bolton	Blood Harvest	Finalist	
2011	John Connolly	The Whisperers	Finalist	
2011	Roslund & Hellström	Three Seconds	Finalist	
2011	Zoë Sharp	Fourth Day	Finalist	
2012	Peter James	Dead Man’s Grip	Winner	
2012	S. J. Bolton	Now You See Me	Finalist	
2012	John Connolly	Hell’s Bells (The Infernals)	Finalist	
2012	R. J. Ellory	Bad Signs	Finalist	
2012	Elly Griffiths	The House at Sea’s End	Finalist	
2012	Arnaldur Indridason	Outrage	Finalist	

=== Best First Novel ===
Barry Award for Best First Novel
Year	Author	Title	Result	Ref.
1997	Charles Todd	A Test of Wills	Winner	
1997	Jameson Cole	A Killing in Quail Country	Finalist	
1997	H. Michael Frase	Fatal Gift	Finalist	
1997	G. D. Gearino	What the Deaf Mute Heard	Finalist	
1997	Michael C. White	A Brother’s Blood	Finalist	
1998	Lee Child	Killing Floor	Winner	
1998	Rosemary Aubert	Free Reign	Finalist	
1998	Maureen Jennings	Except the Dying	Finalist	
1998	Joseph Kanon	Los Alamos	Finalist	
1998	Lisa See	Flower Net	Finalist	
1998	Barbara Seranella	No Human Involved	Finalist	
1999	William Kent Krueger	Iron Lake	Winner	
1999	John Billheimer	The Contrary Blues	Finalist	
1999	Steve Hamilton	A Cold Day in Paradise	Finalist	
1999	Robin Hathaway	The Doctor Digs a Grave	Finalist	
1999	William Hoffman	Tidewater Blood	Finalist	
1999	J. Wallis Martin	A Likeness in Stone	Finalist	
1999	Lisa Reardon	Billy Dead	Finalist	
1999	D.R. Schanker	A Criminal Appeal	Finalist	
2000	Donna Andrews	Murder With Peacocks	Winner	
2000	Mark Coggins	The Immortal Game	Finalist	
2000	Dan Fesperman	Lie in the Dark	Finalist	
2000	Stan Jones	White Sky, Black Ice	Finalist	
2000	Gregg Main	Every Trace	Finalist	
2001	David Liss	A Conspiracy of Paper	Winner	
2001	Stephen Horn	In Her Defense	Finalist	
2001	Scott Phillips	The Ice Harvest	Finalist	
2001	Bob Truluck	Street Level	Finalist	
2001	Qiu Xiaolong	Death of a Red Heroine	Finalist	
2002	C. J. Box	Open Season	Winner	
2002	K. J. Erickson	Third Person Singular	Finalist	
2002	David Fulmer	Chasing the Devil’s Tail	Finalist	
2002	M. K. Preston	Perhaps She’ll Die	Finalist	
2002	Karin Slaughter	Blindsighted	Finalist	
2002	Sarah Strohmeyer	Bubbles Unbound	Finalist	
2003	Julia Spencer-Fleming	In the Bleak Midwinter	Winner	
2003	David Corbett	The Devil’s Redhead	Finalist	
2003	Pip Granger	Not All Tarts Are Apple	Finalist	
2003	Jonathan King	The Blue Edge of Midnight	Finalist	
2003	Eddie Muller	The Distance	Finalist	
2003	Ben Rehder	Buck Fever	Finalist	
2004	P. J. Tracy	Monkeewrench	Winner	
2004	William Landay	Mission Flats	Finalist	
2004	Olen Steinhauer	The Bridge of Sighs	Finalist	
2004	Wallace Stroby	Barbed Wire Kiss	Finalist	
2004	Jacqueline Winspear	Maisie Dobbs	Finalist	
2004	Edward Wright	Clea’s Moon	Finalist	
2005	Carlos Ruiz Zafón	The Shadow of the Wind	Winner	
2005	Charles Benoit	Relative Danger	Finalist	
2005	James O. Born	Walking Money	Finalist	
2005	Colin Cotterill	The Coroner's Lunch	Finalist	
2005	Claire Matturro	Skinny-Dipping	Finalist	
2005	Will Thomas	Some Danger Involved	Finalist	
2006	Stuart MacBride	Cold Granite	Winner	
2006	Megan Abbott	Die a Little	Finalist	
2006	Brian Freeman	Immoral	Finalist	
2006	Randall Hicks	The Baby Game	Finalist	
2006	David Hosp	Dark Harbor	Finalist	
2007	Louise Penny	Still Life	Winner	
2007	Alex Berenson	The Faithful Spy	Finalist	
2007	Gillian Flynn	Sharp Objects	Finalist	
2007	Tom Gabbay	The Berlin Conspiracy	Finalist	
2007	John Hart	The King of Lies	Finalist	
2007	Cornelia Read	A Field of Darkness	Finalist	
2008	Tana French	In the Woods	Winner	
2008	Gordon Campbell	Missing Witness	Finalist	
2008	Sean Chercover	Big City, Bad Blood	Finalist	
2008	Lisa Lutz	The Spellman Files	Finalist	
2008	Matt Beynon Rees	The Collaborator of Bethlehem	Finalist	
2008	Marcus Sakey	The Blade Itself	Finalist	
2009	Tom Rob Smith	Child 44	Winner	
2009	Tom Epperson	The Kind One	Finalist	
2009	Julie Kramer	Stalking Susan	Finalist	
2009	David Levien	City of the Sun	Finalist	
2009	Michael Stanley	A Carrion Death	Finalist	
2009	Carolyn D. Wall	Sweeping Up Glass	Finalist	
2010	Alan Bradley	The Sweetness at the Bottom of the Pie	Winner	
2010	Josh Bazell	Beat the Reaper	Finalist	
2010	Rebecca Cantrell	A Trace of Smoke	Finalist	
2010	Sophie Littlefield	A Bad Day for Sorry	Finalist	
2010	Attica Locke	Black Water Rising	Finalist	
2010	Stuart Neville	The Ghosts of Belfast	Finalist	
2011	Paul Doiron	The Poacher’s Son	Winner	
2011	Lou Berney	Gutshot Straight	Finalist	
2011	Bruce DeSilva	Rogue Island	Finalist	
2011	Graham Moore	The Sherlockian	Finalist	
2011	William Ryan	The Holy Thief	Finalist	
2011	Keith Thomson	Once a Spy	Finalist	
2012	Taylor Stevens	The Informationist	Winner	
2012	Sara Henry	Learning To Swim	Finalist	
2012	Keigo Higashino	The Devotion of Suspect X	Finalist	
2012	Lene Kaaberbol and Agnette Friis	The Boy in the Suitcase	Finalist	
2012	Alice LaPlante	Turn of Mind	Finalist	
2012	S. J. Bolton	Before I Go To Sleep	Finalist	
2013	Julia Keller	A Killing in the Hills	Winner	
2013	Alex Grecian	The Yard	Finalist	
2013	Owen Laukkanen	The Professionals	Finalist	
2013	David Mark	The Dark Winter	Finalist	
2013	Tim O'Mara	Sacrifice Fly	Finalist	
2013	Michael Sears	Black Fridays	Finalist	
2014	Barry Lancet	Japantown	Winner	
2014	Hannah Kent	Burial Rites	Finalist	
2014	Charlie Lovett	The Bookman’s Tale	Finalist	
2014	Becky Masterman	Rage Against the Dying	Finalist	
2014	Jenny Milchman	Cover of Snow	Finalist	
2014	Derek B. Miller	Norwegian by Night	Finalist	
2015	Julia Dahl	Invisible City	Winner	
2015	Adam Brookes	Night Heron	Finalist	
2015	M. P. Cooley	Ice Shear	Finalist	
2015	Elizabeth Little	Dear Daughter	Finalist	
2015	Laura McHugh	The Weight of Blood	Finalist	
2015	William Shaw	She’s Leaving Home	Finalist	
2016	Ausma Zehanat Khan	The Unquiet Dead	Winner	
2016	John A. Connell	Ruins of War	Finalist	
2016	Glen Erik Hamilton	Past Crimes	Finalist	
2016	Elsa Hart	Jade Dragon Mountain	Finalist	
2016	Paula Hawkins	The Girl on the Train	Finalist	
2016	Brian Panowich	Bull Mountain	Finalist	
2017	Nicholas Petrie	The Drifter	Winner	
2017	Bill Beverly	Dodgers	Finalist	
2017	Samuel Bjork	I’m Traveling Alone	Finalist	
2017	Joe Ide	IQ	Finalist	
2017	Iain Reid	I’m Thinking of Ending Things	Finalist	
2017	Susie Steiner	Missing, Presumed	Finalist	
2018	Jane Harper	The Dry	Winner	
2018	Jordan Harper	She Rides Shotgun	Finalist	
2018	Sheena Kamal	The Lost Ones	Finalist	
2018	H. B. Lyle	The Irregular	Finalist	
2018	Abir Mukherjee	A Rising Man	Finalist	
2018	Gabriel Tallent	My Absolute Darling	Finalist	
2019	C.J. Tudor	The Chalk Man	Winner	
2019	Oyinkan Braithwaite	My Sister, the Serial Killer	Finalist	
2019	Karen Cleveland	Need To Know	Finalist	
2019	John Copenhaver	Dodging and Burning	Finalist	
2019	Caz Frear	Sweet Little Lies	Finalist	
2019	James A. McLaughlin	Bearskin	Finalist	
2020	Søren Sveistrup	The Chestnut Man	Winner	
2020	Chris Hammer	Scrublands	Finalist	
2020	S. A. Lelchuk	Save Me from Dangerous Men	Finalist	
2020	Alex Michaelides	The Silent Patient	Finalist	
2020	Holly Watt	To the Lions	Finalist	
2020	Lauren Wilkinson	American Spy	Finalist	
2021	David Heska Wanbli Weiden	Winter Counts	Winner	
2021	Chris Hauty	Deep State	Finalist	
2021	Nev March	Murder in Old Bombay	Finalist	
2021	Richard Osman	The Thursday Murder Club	Finalist	
2021	Alex Pavesi	The Eighth Detective	Finalist	
2021	Stephanie Wrobel	Darling Rose Gold	Finalist	
2022	Connor Sullivan	Sleeping Bear	Winner	
2022	Alexandra Andrews	Who Is Maud Dixon?	Finalist	
2022	Abigail Dean	Girl A	Finalist	
2022	Taylor Moore	Down Range	Finalist	
2022	T. J. Newman	Falling	Finalist	
2022	Brandon Webb and John David Mann	Steel Fear	Finalist	
2023	Nita Prose	The Maid	Winner	
2023	Jacqueline Bublitz	Before You Knew My Name	Finalist	
2023	Eli Cranor	Don't Know Tough	Finalist	
2023	Ramona Emerson	Shutter	Finalist	
2023	Sascha Rothchild	Blood Sugar	Finalist	
2023	Hayley Scrivenor	Dirt Creek	Finalist	
2024	I. S. Berry	The Peacock and the Sparrow	Winner	
2024	Michael Bennett	Better the Blood	Finalist	
2024	Bruce Borgos	The Bitter Past	Finalist	
2024	Amy Chua	The Golden Gate	Finalist	
2024	Deepti Kapoor	Age of Vice	Finalist	
2024	Nina Simon	Mother-Daughter Murder Night	Finalist	
2024	Iris Yamashita	City Under One Roof	Finalist	
2025	C. B. Bernard	Ordinary Bear	Winner	
2025	Kat Ailes	The Expectant Detectives	Finalist	
2025	Tom Baragwanath	Paper Cage	Finalist	
2025	Jo Callaghan	In the Blink of an Eye	Finalist	
2025	Ashley Elston	First Lie Wins	Finalist	
2025	Amy Tintera	Listen for the Lie	Finalist	
2026	Amran Gowani	Leverage	Finalist	
2026	Sarah Harman	All the Other Mothers Hate Me	Finalist	
2026	Jakob Kerr	Dead Money	Finalist	
2026	Zoe Rankin	The Vanishing Place	Finalist	
2026	Tanya Scott	Stillwater	Finalist	
2026	Liann Zhang	Julie Chan Is Dead	Finalist	

=== Best Novel ===
Barry Award for Best Novel
Year	Author	Title	Result	Ref.
1997	Peter Lovesey	Bloodhounds	Winner	
1997	Thomas H. Cook	The Chatham School Affair	Finalist	
1997	Reginald Hill	The Wood Beyond	Finalist	
1997	Rochelle Krich	Speak No Evil	Finalist	
1997	Margaret Lawrence	Hearts and Bones	Finalist	
1997	Thomas Perry	Dance for the Dead	Finalist	
1998	Michael Connelly	Trunk Music	Winner	
1998	James Lee Burke	Cimarron Rose	Finalist	
1998	Jan Burke	Hocus	Finalist	
1998	Deborah Crombie	Dreaming of the Bones	Finalist	
1998	Bill Pronzini	A Wasteland of Strangers	Finalist	
1998	S. J. Rozan	No Colder Place	Finalist	
1998	Don Winslow	The Death and Life of Bobby Z	Finalist	
1999	Reginald Hill	On Beulah Height	Winner	
1999	Dennis Lehane	Gone, Baby, Gone	Winner	
1999	Rhys Bowen	Evan Help Us	Finalist	
1999	Michael Connelly	Blood Work	Finalist	
1999	Jeffery Deaver	The Coffin Dancer	Finalist	
1999	Carol O'Connell	Judas Child	Finalist	
1999	Ian Rankin	The Hanging Garden	Finalist	
1999	Mary Willis Walker	All the Dead Lie Down	Finalist	
2000	Peter Robinson	In a Dry Season	Winner	
2000	Michael Connelly	Angels Flight	Finalist	
2000	Robert Crais	L.A. Requiem	Finalist	
2000	Janet Evanovich	High Five	Finalist	
2000	John Katzenbach	Hart’s War	Finalist	
2000	Dennis Lehane	Prayers for Rain	Finalist	
2001	Nevada Barr	Deep South	Winner	
2001	Lee Child	Running Blind	Finalist	
2001	Thomas H. Cook	Places in the Dark	Finalist	
2001	Bill Fitzhugh	Cross Dressing	Finalist	
2001	Steve Hamilton	Winter of the Wolf Moon	Finalist	
2001	Barbara Seranella	Unwanted Company	Finalist	
2002	Dennis Lehane	Mystic River	Winner	
2002	Harlan Coben	Tell No One	Finalist	
2002	Michael Connelly	A Darkness More Than Night	Finalist	
2002	William Kent Krueger	Purgatory Ridge	Finalist	
2002	T. Jefferson Parker	Silent Joe	Finalist	
2002	George P. Pelecanos	Right as Rain	Finalist	
2002	Donald E. Westlake	Bad News	Finalist	
2003	Michael Connelly	City of Bones	Winner	
2003	Lee Child	Without Fail	Finalist	
2003	Tim Cockey	The Hearse Case Scenario	Finalist	
2003	Steve Hamilton	North of Nowhere	Finalist	
2003	George P. Pelecanos	Hell to Pay	Finalist	
2003	S. J. Rozan	Winter and Night	Finalist	
2004	Laura Lippman	Every Secret Thing	Winner	
2004	Ken Bruen	The Guards	Finalist	
2004	Dan Fesperman	The Small Boat of Great Sorrows	Finalist	
2004	Laurie R. King	Keeping Watch	Finalist	
2004	Dennis Lehane	Shutter Island	Finalist	
2004	Julia Spencer-Fleming	A Fountain Filled with Blood	Finalist	
2005	Lee Child	The Enemy	Winner	
2005	K. J. Erickson	Alone at Night	Finalist	
2005	Jeff Lindsay	Darkly Dreaming Dexter	Finalist	
2005	Chris Mooney	Remembering Sarah	Finalist	
2005	Walter Mosley	Little Scarlet	Finalist	
2005	George P. Pelecanos	Hard Revolution	Finalist	
2006	Thomas H. Cook	Red Leaves	Winner	
2006	Jan Burke	Bloodlines	Finalist	
2006	William Kent Krueger	Mercy Falls	Finalist	
2006	David Rosenfelt	Sudden Death	Finalist	
2006	James Swain	Mr. Lucky	Finalist	
2006	Don Winslow	The Power of the Dog	Finalist	
2007	George Pelecanos	The Night Gardener	Winner	
2007	Ace Atkins	White Shadow	Finalist	
2007	Rhys Bowen	Oh Danny Boy	Finalist	
2007	Dan Fesperman	The Prisoner of Guantanamo	Finalist	
2007	Ariana Franklin	City of Shadows	Finalist	
2008	Laura Lippman	What the Dead Know	Winner	
2008	Reed Farrel Coleman	Soul Patch	Finalist	
2008	John Connolly	The Unquiet	Finalist	
2008	John Hart	Down River	Finalist	
2008	J. A. Konrath	Dirty Martini	Finalist	
2008	Peter Spiegelman	Red Cat	Finalist	
2009	Arnaldur Indriðason	The Draining Lake	Winner	
2009	Sean Chercover	Trigger City	Finalist	
2009	Michael Koryta	Envy the Night	Finalist	
2009	William Kent Krueger	Red Knife	Finalist	
2009	Louise Penny	The Cruelest Month	Finalist	
2009	Don Winslow	The Dawn Patrol	Finalist	
2010	John Hart	The Last Child	Winner	
2010	John Connolly	The Gates	Finalist	
2010	David Ellis	The Hidden Man	Finalist	
2010	Joe Gores	Spade & Archer	Finalist	
2010	Marcia Muller	Locked In	Finalist	
2010	S. J. Rozan	The Shanghai Moon	Finalist	
2011	Steve Hamilton	The Lock Artist	Winner	
2011	C. J. Box	Nowhere To Run	Finalist	
2011	Tom Franklin	Crooked Letter, Crooked Letter	Finalist	
2011	Dennis Lehane	Moonlight Mile	Finalist	
2011	Louise Penny	Bury Your Dead	Finalist	
2011	Don Winslow	Savages	Finalist	
2012	Jussi Adler-Olsen	The Keeper of Lost Causes	Winner	
2012	Linwood Barclay	The Accident	Finalist	
2012	Reed Farrel Coleman	Hurt Machine	Finalist	
2012	John Hart	Iron House	Finalist	
2012	Craig Johnson	Hell Is Empty	Finalist	
2012	Henning Mankell	The Troubled Man	Finalist	
2013	Peter May	The Blackhouse	Winner	
2013	Linwood Barclay	Trust Your Eyes	Finalist	
2013	S. J. Bolton	Dead Scared	Finalist	
2013	Gillian Flynn	Gone Girl	Finalist	
2013	William Landay	Defending Jacob	Finalist	
2013	Dennis Lehane	Live by Night	Finalist	
2014	William Kent Krueger	Ordinary Grace	Winner	
2014	Jussi Adler-Olsen	A Conspiracy of Faith	Finalist	
2014	Linwood Barclay	A Tap on the Window	Finalist	
2014	Thomas H. Cook	Sandrine’s Case	Finalist	
2014	Robert Crais	Suspect	Finalist	
2014	Ian Rankin	Standing in Another Man’s Grave	Finalist	
2015	Greg Iles	Natchez Burning	Winner	
2015	Jussi Adler-Olsen	The Marco Effect	Finalist	
2015	James R. Benn	The Rest Is Silence	Finalist	
2015	Reed Farrel Coleman	The Hollow Girl	Finalist	
2015	Bruce DeSilva	Providence Rag	Finalist	
2015	Arnaldur Indridason	Strange Shores	Finalist	
2016	C.J. Box	Badlands	Winner	
2016	John Connolly	A Song of Shadows	Finalist	
2016	Owen Laukkanen	The Stolen Ones	Finalist	
2016	Michael Robotham	Life or Death	Finalist	
2016	Jeffrey Siger	Devil of Delphi	Finalist	
2016	Don Winslow	The Cartel	Finalist	
2017	Louise Penny	A Great Reckoning	Winner	
2017	Reed Farrel Coleman	Where It Hurts	Finalist	
2017	Michael Connelly	The Wrong Side of Goodbye	Finalist	
2017	Steve Hamilton	The Second Life of Nick Mason	Finalist	
2017	Laura Lippman	Wilde Lake	Finalist	
2017	David Swinson	The Second Girl	Finalist	
2018	Karen Dionne	The Marsh King’s Daughter	Winner	
2018	Michael Connelly	The Late Show	Finalist	
2018	Steve Hamilton	Exit Strategy	Finalist	
2018	Anthony Horowitz	Magpie Murders	Finalist	
2018	Philip Kerr	Prussian Blue	Finalist	
2018	Don Winslow	The Force	Finalist	
2019	Lou Berney	November Road	Winner	
2019	Michael Connelly	Dark Sacred Night	Finalist	
2019	Allen Eskens	The Shadows We Hide	Finalist	
2019	Craig Johnson	Depth of Winter	Finalist	
2019	Mindy Mejia	Leave No Trace	Finalist	
2019	Abir Mukherjee	A Necessary Evil	Finalist	
2020	Jane Harper	The Lost Man	Winner	
2020	Steve Cavanagh	Th1rt3en	Finalist	
2020	Steph Cha	Your House Will Pay	Finalist	
2020	Philip Kerr	Metropolis	Finalist	
2020	Michael Koryta	If She Wakes	Finalist	
2020	Don Winslow	The Border	Finalist	
2021	S. A. Cosby	Blacktop Wasteland	Winner	
2021	Harlan Coben	The Boy from the Woods	Finalist	
2021	Michael Connelly	The Law of Innocence	Finalist	
2021	Anthony Horowitz	Moonflower Murders	Finalist	
2021	Rachel Howzell Hall	And Now She’s Gone	Finalist	
2021	Louise Penny	All the Devils Are Here	Finalist	
2022	S. A. Cosby	Razorblade Tears	Winner	
2022	Michael Connelly	The Dark Hours	Finalist	
2022	Matt Coyle	Last Redemption	Finalist	
2022	Naomi Hirahara	Clark and Division	Finalist	
2022	Stephen King	Billy Summers	Finalist	
2022	Chris Whitaker	We Begin at the End	Finalist	
2023	Michael Connelly	Desert Star	Winner	
2023	Steve Cavanagh	The Accomplice	Finalist	
2023	Deon Meyer	The Dark Flood	Finalist	
2023	Chris Offutt	Shifty's Boys	Finalist	
2023	Alex Segura	Secret Identity	Finalist	
2023	Don Winslow	City on Fire	Finalist	
2024	Dennis Lehane	Small Mercies	Winner	
2024	Lou Berney	Dark Ride	Finalist	
2024	S. A. Cosby	All the Sinners Bleed	Finalist	
2024	Eli Cranor	Ozark Dogs	Finalist	
2024	Jordan Harper	Everybody Knows	Finalist	
2024	Adrian McKinty	The Detective Up Late	Finalist	
2025	Michael Connelly	The Waiting	Finalist	
2025	William Kent Krueger	Spirit Crossing	Finalist	
2025	Liz Moore	The God of the Woods	Finalist	
2025	Ian Rankin	Midnight and Blue	Finalist	
2025	Duane Swierczynski	California Bear	Finalist	
2025	Chris Whitaker	All the Colors of the Dark	Finalist	
2026	Belinda Bauer	The Impossible Thing	Finalist	
2026	Lou Berney	Crooks	Finalist	
2026	S. A. Cosby	King of Ashes	Finalist	
2026	Louise Penny	The Black Wolf	Finalist	
2026	Michael Robotham	The White Crow	Finalist	
2026	Scott Turow	Presumed Guilty	Finalist	

=== Best Paperback Original ===
Barry Award for Best Paperback Original
Year	Author	Title	Result	Ref.
1997	Susan Wade	Walking Rain	Winner	
1997	Harlan Coben	Fade Away	Finalist	
1997	Teri Holbrook	The Grass Widow	Finalist	
1998	Harlan Coben	Back Spin	Winner	
1998	Sujata Massey	The Salaryman’s Wife	Finalist	
1998	Rick Riordan	Big Red Tequila	Finalist	
1998	Penny Warner	Dead Body Language	Finalist	
2000	Robin Burcell	Every Move She Makes	Winner	
2000	Caroline Roe	Antidote for Avarice	Winner	
2000	Sinclair Browning	The Last Song Dogs	Finalist	
2000	Carolyn Haines	Them Bones	Finalist	
2000	Jerry Kennealy	The Hunted	Finalist	
2001	Eric Wright	The Kidnapping of Rosie Dawn	Winner	
2001	Glynn Marsh Alam	Dive Deep and Deadly	Finalist	
2001	Kate Grilley	Death Dances to a Reggae Beat	Finalist	
2001	Cathie John	Little Mexico	Finalist	
2001	Beth Saulnier	Distemper	Finalist	
2002	Deborah Woodworth	Killer Gifts	Winner	
2002	Sinclair Browning	Rode Hard, Put Away Dead	Finalist	
2002	Deborah Morgan	Death Is a Cabaret	Finalist	
2002	Beth Saulnier	The Fourth Wall	Finalist	
2002	Martin J. Smith	Straw Men	Finalist	
2003	Danielle Girard	Cold Silence	Winner	
2003	Jeff Abbott	Black Jack Point	Finalist	
2003	Robin Burcell	Fatal Truth	Finalist	
2003	Daniel Judson	The Bone Orchard	Finalist	
2003	Anna Salter	Prison Blues	Finalist	
2003	Brian M. Wiprud	Pipsqueak	Finalist	
2004	Jason Starr	Tough Luck	Winner	
2004	Elaine Flinn	Dealing in Murder	Finalist	
2004	Christopher Hyde	Wisdom of the Bones	Finalist	
2004	Jay MacLarty	The Courier	Finalist	
2004	Judith Van Gieson	The Shadow of Venus	Finalist	
2004	Elaine Viets	Murder Between the Covers	Finalist	
2005	Elaine Flinn	Tagged for Murder	Winner	
2005	Larry Beinhart	The Librarian	Finalist	
2005	Thomas H. Cook	Into the Web	Finalist	
2005	M.G. Kincaid	Last Seen in Aberdeen	Finalist	
2005	Domenic Stansberry	The Confession	Finalist	
2005	Jason Starr	Twisted City	Finalist	
2006	Reed Farrel Coleman	The James Deans	Winner	
2006	Charlie Huston	Six Bad Things	Finalist	
2006	Maureen Jennings	Night’s Child	Finalist	
2006	Rochelle Krich	Now You See Me…	Finalist	
2006	Mary Jane Maffini	The Dead Don’t Get Out Much	Finalist	
2006	John Ramsey Miller	Inside Out	Finalist	
2007	Sean Doolittle	The Cleanup	Winner	
2007	Ken Bruen and Jason Starr	Bust	Finalist	
2007	Max Allan Collins	The Last Quarry	Finalist	
2007	Jay MacLarty	Live Wire	Finalist	
2007	James Swain	Deadman’s Poker	Finalist	
2007	Brian M. Wiprud	Crooked	Finalist	
2008	Megan Abbott	Queenpin	Winner	
2008	Felicia Donovan	The Black Widow Agency	Finalist	
2008	Jay MacLarty	Choke Point	Finalist	
2008	Jason Pinter	The Mark	Finalist	
2008	Fred Vargas	Wash This Blood Clean From My Hand	Finalist	
2008	Kevin Wignall	Who Is Conrad Hirst?	Finalist	
2009	Julie Hyzy	State of the Onion	Winner	
2009	Max Allan Collins	The First Quarry	Finalist	
2009	Christa Faust	Money Shot	Finalist	
2009	Åsa Larsson	The Black Path	Finalist	
2009	Duane Swierczynski	Severance Package	Finalist	
2009	Johan Theorin	Echoes from the Dead	Finalist	
2010	Bryan Gruley	Starvation Lake	Winner	
2010	Megan Abbott	Bury Me Deep	Finalist	
2010	Max Allan Collins	Quarry in the Middle	Finalist	
2010	Heather Gudenkauf	The Weight of Silence	Finalist	
2010	Frank Tallis	Fatal Lies	Finalist	
2010	L. C. Tyler	The Herring Seller’s Apprentice	Finalist	
2011	Val McDermid	Fever of the Bone	Winner	
2011	Bryan Gruley	The Hanging Tree	Finalist	
2011	Sophie Hannah	The Dead Lie Down	Finalist	
2011	Julie Hyzy	Eggsecutive Orders	Finalist	
2011	Judith Rock	The Rhetoric of Death	Finalist	
2011	A. D. Scott	A Small Death in the Great Glen	Finalist	
2012	Michael Stanley	The Death of the Mantis	Winner	
2012	Brett Battles	The Silenced	Finalist	
2012	Oliver Pötzsch	The Hangman's Daughter	Finalist	
2012	A. D. Scott	A Double Death on the Black Isle	Finalist	
2012	Duane Swierczynski	Fun & Games	Finalist	
2012	Nicola Upson	Two for Sorrow	Finalist	
2013	Susan Elia MacNeal	Mr. Churchill’s Secretary	Winner	
2013	John Enright	Pago Pago Tango	Finalist	
2013	Alan Glynn	Bloodland	Finalist	
2013	Sophie Hannah	The Other Woman’s House	Finalist	
2013	Malla Nunn	Blessed Are the Dead	Finalist	
2013	A. D. Scott	Beneath the Abbey Wall	Finalist	
2014	Adrian McKinty	I Hear the Sirens in the Street	Winner	
2014	Paul Cleave	Joe Victim	Finalist	
2014	Ian Hamilton	The Disciple of Las Vegas	Finalist	
2014	Gene Kerrigan	The Rage	Finalist	
2014	Nicola Upson	Fear in the Sunlight	Finalist	
2014	Elaine Viets	Fixing to Die	Finalist	
2015	Allen Eskens	The Life We Bury	Winner	
2015	Joël Dicker	The Truth About the Harry Quebert Affair	Finalist	
2015	Alex Marwood	The Killer Next Door	Finalist	
2015	Malla Nunn	Present Darkness	Finalist	
2015	Lori Rader-Day	The Black Hour	Finalist	
2015	Stav Sherez	Eleven Days	Finalist	
2016	Lou Berney	The Long and Faraway Gone	Winner	
2016	Kristi Belcamino	Blessed Are Those Who Weep	Finalist	
2016	Max Allan Collins	Quarry’s Choice	Finalist	
2016	Sarah Hilary	No Other Darkness	Finalist	
2016	Ragnar Jónasson	Snowblind	Finalist	
2016	James W. Ziskin	Stone Cold Dead	Finalist	
2017	Adrian McKinty	Rain Dogs	Winner	
2017	Flynn Berry	Under the Harrow	Finalist	
2017	Allen Eskens	The Heavens May Fall	Finalist	
2017	Susan Elia MacNeal	The Queen’s Accomplice	Finalist	
2017	Alex Marwood	The Darkest Secret	Finalist	
2017	Jake Needham	The Girl in the Window	Finalist	
2018	Allen Eskens	The Deep Dark Descending	Winner	
2018	R. J. Bailey	Safe from Harm	Finalist	
2018	Kristi Belcamino	Blessed Are the Peacemakers	Finalist	
2018	Kellye Garrett	Hollywood Homicide	Finalist	
2018	Lori Rader-Day	The Day I Died	Finalist	
2018	James Swain	Super Con	Finalist	
2019	Dervla McTiernan	The Rúin	Winner	
2019	Christine Carbo	A Sharp Solitude	Finalist	
2019	David Mark	Dead Pretty	Finalist	
2019	Sherry Thomas	The Hollow of Fear	Finalist	
2019	Emma Viskic	Resurrection Bay	Finalist	
2020	Rick Mofina	Missing Daughter	Winner	
2020	RJ Bailey	Winner Kills All	Finalist	
2020	Hannelore Cayre	The Godmother	Finalist	
2020	Max Allan Collins	Killing Quarry	Finalist	
2020	Ian Hamilton	Fate: The Lost Decades of Uncle Chow Tung	Finalist	
2020	James Swain	No Good Deed	Finalist	
2021	James W. Ziskin	Turn to Stone	Winner	
2021	Alyssa Cole	When No One Is Watching	Finalist	
2021	Jake Needham	Monkok Station	Finalist	
2021	Jason Pinter	Hide Away	Finalist	
2021	James Swain	Bad News Travels Fast	Finalist	
2021	Emma Viskic	Darkness for Light	Finalist	
2022	Dervla McTiernan	The Good Turn	Winner	
2022	Gabriel Bergmoser	The Hunted	Finalist	
2022	Mia P. Manansala	Arsenic and Adobo	Finalist	
2022	Andrew Mayne	Black Coral	Finalist	
2022	Rick Mofina	Search for Her	Finalist	
2022	Vanda Symon	Bound	Finalist	
2023	No award presented			
2024	Jake Needham	Who the Hell is Harry Black	Winner	
2024	Mia P. Manansala	Murder and Mamon	Finalist	
2024	Rick Mofina	Everything She Feared	Finalist	
2024	Jesse Sutanto	Vera Wong's Unsolicited Advice for Murderers	Finalist	
2024	Vanda Symon	Expectant	Finalist	
2024	Scott Von Doviak	Lowdown Road	Finalist	
2025	Lou Berney	Double Barrel Bluff	Winner	
2025	Cara Hunter	All the Rage	Finalist	
2025	Jahmal Mayfield	Smoke Kings	Finalist	
2025	Rick Mofina	Someone Saw Something	Finalist	
2025	Stella Sands	Wordhunter	Finalist	
2025	James Swain	Sin City	Finalist	
2026	Bruce Robert Coffin	Crimson Thaw	Finalist	
2026	Kim Hays	Splintered Justice	Finalist	
2026	Cara Hunter	Making a Killing	Finalist	
2026	Rick Mofina	If Two Are Dead	Finalist	
2026	Alex Shaw	Wolf Six	Finalist	
2026	Tim Sullivan	The Dentist	Finalist	

=== Best Short Story ===
Barry Award for Best Short Story
Year	Author	Story	Publication	Result	Ref.
2004	Robert Barnard	Rogues’ Gallery	Ellery Queen Mystery Magazine, March 2003	Winner	
2004	Doug Allyn	The Blind Pig	Ellery Queen Mystery Magazine, May 2003	Finalist	
2004	Brendan DuBois	Always Another War	Alfred Hitchcock Mystery Magazine, July/August 2003	Finalist	
2004	Clark Howard	The Mask of Peter	Ellery Queen Mystery Magazine, April 2003	Finalist	
2004	Donald Olson	Rogue's Run	Ellery Queen Mystery Magazine, April 2003	Finalist	
2005	Edward D. Hoch	The War in Wonderland	Green for Danger	Winner	
2005	Catherine Aird	Cold Comfort	Chapter & Hearse & Other Mysteries	Finalist	
2005	Melodie Johnson Howe; Melodie Johnson Howe	Facing Up	Ellery Queen Mystery Magazine, July 2004	Finalist	
2005	John Mortimer	Rumpole and the Christmas Break	The Strand Magazine, #14, 2004	Finalist	
2005	Amy Myers	Murder, the Missing Heir, and the Boiled Egg	Criminal Appetites	Finalist	
2005	Neil Schofield	Ledgers	Ellery Queen Mystery Magazine, July 2004	Finalist	
2006	Nancy Pickard	There is no Crime on Easter Island	Ellery Queen Mystery Magazine, September/October 2005	Winner	
2006	Steve Hockensmith	The Big Road	Alfred Hitchcock Mystery Magazine, May 2005	Finalist	
2006	Peter Lovesey	Needle Match	Murder Is My Racquet	Finalist	
2006	Joan Richter	Love and Death in Africa	Ellery Queen Mystery Magazine, January 2005	Finalist	
2006	Tom Savage	The Method in her Madness	Alfred Hitchcock Mystery Magazine, June 2005	Finalist	
2007	Brendan DuBois	The Right Call	Ellery Queen Mystery Magazine, September/October 2006	Winner	
2007	Simon Brett	Cain Was Innocent	Thou Shalt Not Kill	Finalist	
2007	Judith Cutler	Shaping the Ends	Ellery Queen Mystery Magazine, May 2006	Finalist	
2007	Kate Ellis	A Man of Taste	Ellery Queen Mystery Magazine, March/April 2006	Finalist	
2007	Paul Halter	The Flower Girl	The Night of the Wolf	Finalist	
2007	June Thomson	A Case for Inspector Ghote	The Verdict of Us All	Finalist	
2008	Edward D. Hoch	The Problem of the Summer Snowman	Ellery Queen Mystery Magazine, November 2007	Winner	
2008	Doug Allyn	Dead As a Dog	Ellery Queen Mystery Magazine, July 2007	Finalist	
2008	Dale C. Andrews and Kurt Sercu	The Book Case	Ellery Queen Mystery Magazine, May 2007	Finalist	
2008	Jon L. Breen	The Missing Elevator Puzzle	Ellery Queen Mystery Magazine, February 2007	Finalist	
2008	Jeffrey Deaver	Bump	Dead Man’s Hand	Finalist	
2008	Gillian Roberts	The Old Wife’s Tale	Ellery Queen Mystery Magazine, March/April 2007	Finalist	
2008	Neil Schofield	Murder: A User's Guibe	Alfred Hitchcock Mystery Magazine, July/August 2007	Finalist	
2009	James O. Born	The Drought	The Blue Religion	Winner	
2009	Jan Burke	The Fallen	Ellery Queen Mystery Magazine, August 2008	Finalist	
2009	Brendan DuBois	A Trace of a Trace	At the Scene of the Crime	Finalist	
2009	G. Miki Hayden	A Killing in Midtown	Alfred Hitchcock Mystery Magazine, January/February 2008	Finalist	
2009	Mick Herron	Proof of Love	Ellery Queen Mystery Magazine, September/October 2008	Finalist	
2009	Edward D. Hoch	The Problem of the Secret Patient	Ellery Queen Mystery Magazine, May 2008	Finalist	
2010	Brendan DuBois	The High House Writer	Alfred Hitchcock Mystery Magazine, July–August 2009	Winner	
2010	Barbara Callahan	My Mother's Keeper	Ellery Queen Mystery Magazine, June 2009	Finalist	
2010	David Dean	Erin's Journal	Ellery Queen Mystery Magazine, December 2009	Finalist	
2010	John H. Dirckx	Real Men Die	Alfred Hitchcock Mystery Magazine, September 2009	Finalist	
2010	Melodie Johnson Howe; Melodie Johnson Howe	A Hollywood Ending	Ellery Queen Mystery Magazine, July 2009	Finalist	
2010	Morley Swingle	Hard Blows	The Prosecution Rests	Finalist	
2011	Loren D. Estleman	The List	Ellery Queen Mystery Magazine, May 2010	Winner	
2011	Mitch Alderman	Requiem for Antlers	Alfred Hitchcock Mystery Magazine, January–February 2010	Finalist	
2011	Robert Barnard	Family Values	Ellery Queen Mystery Magazine, February 2010	Finalist	
2011	Caroline Benton	The Body in the Dunes	Ellery Queen Mystery Magazine, January 2010	Finalist	
2011	Terence Faherty	The Seven Sorrows	Ellery Queen Mystery Magazine, March–April 2010	Finalist	
2011	Ellen Larson	When the Apricots Bloom	Alfred Hitchcock Mystery Magazine, July–August 2010	Finalist	
2012	Jeffrey Cohen	The Gun Also Rises	Alfred Hitchcock Mystery Magazine, January–February 2011	Winner	
2012	Doug Allyn	Thicker Than Blood	Alfred Hitchcock Mystery Magazine, September 2011	Finalist	
2012	Mike Cooper	Whiz Bang	Ellery Queen Mystery Magazine, September–October 2011	Finalist	
2012	Trina Corey	Facts Exhibiting Wantonness	Ellery Queen Mystery Magazine, November 2011	Finalist	
2012	James Powell	Last Laugh in Floogle Park	Ellery Queen Mystery Magazine, July 2011	Finalist	
2012	Eric Rutter	Purge	Alfred Hitchcock Mystery Magazine, December 2011	Finalist	

=== Best Thriller ===
Barry Award for Best Thriller
Year	Author	Title	Result	Ref.
2005	Barry Eisler	Rain Storm	Winner	
2005	Joseph Finder	Paranoia	Finalist	
2005	Joseph Garber	Whirlwind	Finalist	
2005	Jay MacLarty	Bagman	Finalist	
2005	Matthew Reilly	Scarecrow	Finalist	
2005	Daniel Silva	A Death in Vienna	Finalist	
2006	Joseph Finder	Company Man (No Hiding Place)	Winner	
2006	Vince Flynn	Consent To Kill	Finalist	
2006	Mike Lawson	The Inside Ring	Finalist	
2006	Matthew Reilly	Seven Deadly Wonders	Finalist	
2006	James Rollins	Map of Bones	Finalist	
2006	Greg Rucka	Private Wars	Finalist	
2007	Daniel Silva	The Messenger	Winner	
2007	Joe Finder	Killer Instinct	Finalist	
2007	Alan Furst	The Foreign Correspondent	Finalist	
2007	Simon Kernick	Relentless	Finalist	
2007	Stephen Leather	Cold Kill	Finalist	
2007	Stephen White	Kill Me	Finalist	
2008	Robert Crais	The Watchman	Winner	
2008	Linwood Barclay	No Time for Goodbye	Finalist	
2008	Brett Battles	The Cleaner	Finalist	
2008	Brent Ghelfi	Volk’s Game	Finalist	
2008	Thomas Perry	Silence	Finalist	
2008	James Swain	Midnight Rambler	Finalist	
2009	Brett Battles	The Deceived	Winner	
2009	Jeff Abbott	Collision	Finalist	
2009	Tom Cain	The Survivor	Finalist	
2009	Colin Harrison	The Finder	Finalist	
2009	Stephen Hunter	Night of Thunder	Finalist	
2009	Marcus Sakey	Good People	Finalist	
2010	Jamie Freveletti	Running from the Devil	Winner	
2010	Tom Cain	No Survivors	Finalist	
2010	Mark Greaney	The Gray Man	Finalist	
2010	Derek Haas	Columbus (Hunt for the Bear)	Finalist	
2010	Mike Lawson	House Secrets	Finalist	
2010	Greg Rucka	Walking Dead	Finalist	
2011	Deon Meyer	Thirteen Hours	Winner	
2011	Noah Boyd	The Bricklayer	Finalist	
2011	Charlie Charters	Bolt Action	Finalist	
2011	Vince Flynn	American Assassin	Finalist	
2011	Mark Greaney	On Target	Finalist	
2011	Daniel Silva	The Rembrandt Affair	Finalist	
2012	Thomas Perry	The Informant	Winner	
2012	Tom Cain	Carver	Finalist	
2012	Ben Coes	Coup d’Etat	Finalist	
2012	Matthew Dunn	Spycatcher (Spartan)	Finalist	
2012	Mark Greaney	Ballistic	Finalist	
2012	Mike Lawson	House Divided	Finalist	
2013	Daniel Silva	The Fallen Angel	Winner	
2013	Ben Coes	The Last Refuge	Finalist	
2013	Charles Cumming	A Foreign Country	Finalist	
2013	Brian Freemantle	Red Star Burning	Finalist	
2013	Derek Haas	The Right Hand	Finalist	
2013	Mike Lawson	House Blood	Finalist	
2014	Taylor Stevens	The Doll	Winner	
2014	Mick Herron	Dead Lions	Finalist	
2014	Roger Hobbs	Ghostman	Finalist	
2014	Jason Matthews	Red Sparrow	Finalist	
2014	Charles McCarry	The Shanghai Factor	Finalist	
2014	Stuart Neville	Ratlines	Finalist	
2015	Michael Koryta	Those Who Wish Me Dead	Winner	
2015	Joe Finder	Suspicion	Finalist	
2015	Ian Hamilton	The Water Rat of Wanchai	Finalist	
2015	Robert Harris	An Officer and a Spy	Finalist	
2015	Terry Hayes	I Am Pilgrim	Finalist	
2015	Mike Lawson	House Reckoning	Finalist	
2016	Taylor Stevens	The Mask	Winner	
2016	Marc Cameron	Brute Force	Finalist	
2016	Chris Holm	The Killing Kind	Finalist	
2016	M. A. Lawson	Viking Bay	Finalist	
2016	Stefanie Pintoff	Hostage Taker	Finalist	
2016	A.J. Tata	Foreign and Domestic	Finalist	
2017	Joseph Finder	Guilty Minds	Winner	
2017	Matthew Betley	Overwatch	Finalist	
2017	Ben Coes	First Strike	Finalist	
2017	Mark Greaney	Back Blast	Finalist	
2017	Andrew Gross	The One Man	Finalist	
2017	Spencer Kope	Collecting the Dead	Finalist	
2018	Meg Gardiner	UNSUB	Winner	
2018	Ben Coes	Trap the Devil	Finalist	
2018	Mark Greaney	Gunmetal Gray	Finalist	
2018	Mick Herron	Spook Street	Finalist	
2018	K. J. Howe	The Freedom Broker	Finalist	
2018	Thomas Perry	The Old Man	Finalist	
2019	Dan Fesperman	Safe Houses	Winner	
2019	Jack Carr	The Terminal List	Finalist	
2019	Mick Herron	London Rules	Finalist	
2019	Anthony Horowitz	Forever and a Day	Finalist	
2019	Nick Petrie	Light It Up	Finalist	
2019	James Swain	The King Tides	Finalist	
2020	Adrian McKinty	The Chain	Winner	
2020	Jack Carr	True Believer	Finalist	
2020	Mark Greaney	Mission Critical	Finalist	
2020	Thomas Perry	The Burglar	Finalist	
2020	Henry Porter	White Hot Silence	Finalist	
2020	Brad Thor	Backlash	Finalist	
2021	Thomas Perry	Eddie’s Boy	Winner	
2021	Tom Bradby	Double Agent	Finalist	
2021	Matt Coyle	Blind Vigil	Finalist	
2021	Mark Greaney	One Minute Out	Finalist	
2021	Deon Meyer	The Last Hunt	Finalist	
2021	Nick Petrie	The Wild One	Finalist	
2022	James Kestrel	Five Decembers	Winner	
2022	Jack Carr	The Devil’s Hand	Finalist	
2022	John Connolly	The Nameless Ones	Finalist	
2022	Paul Doiron	Dead by Dawn	Finalist	
2022	Mark Greaney	Relentless	Finalist	
2022	Mick Herron	Slough House	Finalist	
2023	Deanna Raybourn	Killers of a Certain Age	Winner	
2023	Jack Carr	In the Blood	Finalist	
2023	Dan Fesperman	Winter Work	Finalist	
2023	Mark Greaney	Sierra Six	Finalist	
2023	Mick Herron	Bad Actors	Finalist	
2023	Richard O'Rawe	Goering's Gold	Finalist	
2024	Mick Herron	The Secret Hours	Winner	
2024	Mark Greaney	Burner	Finalist	
2024	John Lawton	Moscow Exile	Finalist	
2024	Anthony McCarten	Going Zero	Finalist	
2024	T. J. Newman	Drowning	Finalist	
2024	Ruth Ware	Zero Days	Finalist	
2025	Thomas Perry	Hero	Winner	
2025	John Brownlow	Assassin Eighteen	Finalist	
2025	Stephen Leather	First Strike	Finalist	
2025	David McCloskey	The Seventh Floor	Finalist	
2025	Abir Mukherjee	Hunted	Finalist	
2025	Nick Petrie	The Price You Pay	Finalist	
2026	Steve Cavanagh	Witness 8	Finalist	
2026	Joseph Finder	The Oligarch's Daughter	Finalist	
2026	Mark Greaney	Midnight Black	Finalist	
2026	Mick Herron	Clown Town	Finalist	
2026	John McMahon	Head Cases	Finalist	
2026	Andrew Welsh-Huggins	The Mailman	Finalist	
