= Girl A =

Girl A may refer to:

- Girl A (novel), by Abigail Dean
- Sasebo slashing
- Sex trafficking in Great Britain
