= Caroline Carver =

Caroline Carver may refer to:

- Caroline Carver (author) (born 1959), crime author
- Caroline Carver (actress) (born 1976), English actress
