= Alan Gregory =

Alan or Allen Gregory may refer to:

- Allen Gregory, a Fox animated television show
- Dr. Alan Gregory, a fictional psychologist in Stephen White's novels
- Alan Gregory, actor in A Hobo's Christmas
