= Allen Eskens =

American author

- Education: Minnesota State University (MFA); University of Minnesota; Hamline University School of Law (JD)
- Occupation: Author
- Awards: Barry Award for Best Paperback Original (2015, 2018)

Allen Eskens is an American former defense attorney who writes mystery, thriller, and suspense novels.

== Biography ==
Eskens grew up in Missouri and now lives in Minnesota. He received a Master of Fine Arts degree from Minnesota State University. He also has a degree in journalism from the University of Minnesota and a Juris Doctor degree from Hamline University School of Law. In addition to official degree programs, he has attended the Iowa Summer Writing Festival and The Loft Literary Center in Minneapolis.

Aside from writing, Eskens previously worked as a criminal defense attorney.

== Awards and honors ==
Awards for Esken's writing
Yea	Title	Award	Result	Ref
2015	The Life We Bury	Anthony Award for Best First Novel	Finalist	
2015	The Life We Bury	Barry Award for Best Paperback Original	Winner	
2015	The Life We Bury	Edgar Award for Best First Novel	Finalist	
2015	The Life We Bury	Left Coast Crime Award for Best First Novel	Winner	
2015	The Life We Bury	Minnesota Book Award for Genre Fiction	Finalist	
2015	The Life We Bury	Thriller Award for Best First Novel	Finalist	
2017	The Heavens May Fall	Barry Award for Best Novel	Finalist	
2017	The Heavens May Fall	Barry Award for Best Paperback Original	Finalist	
2018	The Deep Dark Descending	Barry Award for Best Paperback Original	Winner	
2019	The Shadows We Hide	Barry Award for Best Novel	Finalist	

== Publications ==
- The Quiet Librarian (2025)

=== Joe Talbert series ===
1. The Life We Bury (2014)
2. The Shadows We Hide (2018)
3. The Stolen Hours (2021)

=== Detective Max Rupert series ===
1. The Life We Bury (2014)
2. The Guise of Another (2015)
3. The Heavens May Fall (2016)
4. The Deep Dark Descending (2017)
5. Forsaken Country (2022)

=== Boady Sanden series ===
1. The Heavens May Fall (2016)
2. Nothing More Dangerous (2019)
3. Saving Emma (2023)
