= Beth Saulnier =

American writer and editor

Elizabeth Bloom (née Saulnier; born 1969) is an American writer and editor.

Saulnier was born September 23, 1969, in North Adams, Massachusetts to Wilfred and Elizabeth Saulnier; her father taught history and her mother was a paralegal.

She received a Bachelor of Arts from Vassar College in 1990, after which she attended Cornell University. She lived in Ithaca for 12 years, during which time she worked with Cornell Magazine as a contributing editor, the Weill Cornell Medical College magazine as an editor, and The Ithaca Journal as a columnist. She received an Associated Press Award for her column "Saulnier on Cinema." She also cohosted the movie review show Take Two on Ithaca's Channel 13.

Saulnier published her debut novel, Reliable Sources, with Grand Central Publishing in 1999. She went on to published Distemper (2000), The Fourth Wall (2001), Bad Seed (2002), and Ecstasy (2003). Distemper and The Fourth Wall was a finalist for the Barry Award for Best Paperback Original in 2001 and 2002, respectively.

On August 10, 2003, Saulnier married David Andrew Bloom, after which she moved to New York City and focused her career on writing. She then published See Isabelle Run (2005) and The Mortician's Daughter (2006) under her married name, Elizabeth Bloom.

== Publications ==
=== As Beth Saulnier ===
- Reliable Sources. New York City: Grand Central Publishing. 1999. ISBN 978-0-446-60781-0.
- Distemper. New York City: Grand Central Publishing. 2000. ISBN 978-0-446-60861-9.
- The Fourth Wall. New York City: Severn. 2001. ISBN 978-0-7278-6197-9.
- Bad Seed. New York City: Mysterious Press. 2002. ISBN 978-0-89296-749-0.
- Ecstasy. New York City: Mysterious Press. 2003. ISBN 978-0-89296-750-6.

=== As Elizabeth Bloom ===
- See Isabelle Run. New York City: Mysterious Press. 2005. ISBN 978-0-89296-785-8.
- The Mortician's Daughter. New York City: Mysterious Press. 2006.
