= Elaine Flinn =

American author and antiques dealer (1939-2008)

Elaine Flinn (March 3, 1939 - October 25, 2008) was an American author and antiques dealer in the San Francisco Bay Area. She drew upon her experiences as an antiques dealer in her mystery novels.

== Biography ==
Flinn was born in Oakland, California on March 3, 1939.

Near the end of the 1950s, Flinn married; she later had five children.

For many years, Flinn owned an antique store named Claybourne's. In the mid-1970s, Flinn moved to Carmel-by-the-Sea, California, where she eventually served as the owner and operator of Del Monte Building Services.

In 2003, at the age of 64, Flinn published her debut novel, Dealing in Murder. The novel was nominated for the Agatha Award for Best First Novel, Gumshoe Award for Best First Novel, Anthony Award for Best Paperback Original, and Barry Award for Best Paperback Original. Her sophomore novel, Tagged for Murder, won the Barry Award for Best Paperback Original. She then published Deadly Collection (2005) and Deadly Vintage (2007).

Flinn died on October 25, 2008, following complications related to cancer and pneumonia.

== Awards ==
Awards for Flinn's writing
Year	Title	Award	Result	Ref.
2003	Dealing in Murder	Agatha Award for Best First Novel	Finalist	
	Dealing in Murder	Gumshoe Award for Best First Novel	Finalist	
2004	Dealing in Murder	Anthony Award for Best Paperback Original	Finalist	
2004	Dealing in Murder	Barry Award for Best Paperback Original	Finalist	
2005	Tagged for Murder	Barry Award for Best Paperback Original	Won	

== Publications ==
- Dealing in Murder. Avon Books. 2003. ISBN 9780060545796.
- Tagged for Murder. Avon Books. 2004. ISBN 9780060545802.
- Deadly Collection. Avon Books. 2005. ISBN 9780060545826.
- Deadly Vintage. Perseverance. 2007. ISBN 978-1-880284-87-2.
