= Jason Pinter =

American author (born 1979)

- Born: November 10, 1979 (age 46); New York, NY
- Education: Wesleyan University
- Occupation: Writer
- Writing career
- Language: English
- Period: 2007-Present
- Genre: Thriller/Crime
- Website: jasonpinter.com

Jason Pinter (born November 10, 1979) is an American author known for his thriller novels.

== Biography ==
Before becoming a writer, Pinter worked for Warner Books, Random House, and St. Martin's Press as a book editor. He was signed to write multiple novels in his Henry Parker series almost immediately after having his first book published. In 2017 he published the political thriller novel THE CASTLE, which he said was inspired by the 2016 presidential election.

He is the author of a humorous adventure novel for young readers Zeke Bartholomew: Superspy!. Pinter has also worked as a columnist for the Huffington Post.

As of 2013, he is the Founder and Publisher of Polis Books, an independent publishing company. In 2019 Pinter launched Agora, an imprint of Polis dedicated to "diverse and underrepresented voices in crime fiction".

Pinter was born in New York City and currently lives in New Jersey. He received his undergraduate degree from Wesleyan University.

== Henry Parker series ==
The Mark

Pinter's debut novel - and the first Henry Parker novel - The Mark (2007) features young journalist Henry Parker's attempt to prove his innocence of the murder of a New York City police officer. The Mark has been optioned to be a feature film. It was named one of the best mysteries of 2007 by Strand Magazine and nominated for the RT Booklovers Reviewers Choice award for Best First Mystery, the Strand Critics award for Best First Novel, and the Barry Award for Best Paperback Original.

The Guilty

In the second Henry Parker novel, The Guilty (2008, March), Henry tries to track down a serial killer terrorizing New York City, who uses an antique Winchester rifle.

The Stolen

In the third Henry Parker novel, Henry interviews a boy who reappears five years after being kidnapped, with no recollection of his missing years. Against pressure from the community and the boy's parents, Henry investigates the strange circumstances surrounding the boy's disappearance. The Stolen (2008, August) was named one of the best mysteries of 2008 by Strand Magazine and nominated for the Shamus Award for Best Paperback Original and the CrimeSpree award for Best Paperback Original.

The Fury

In the fourth Henry Parker novel, Henry must track down his brother's killer, who may or may not have ties to a long-dormant drug kingpin. The Fury (2009, October) was named one of the best mysteries of 2009 by Strand Magazine.

The Hunters: A Novella

In November 2009 Pinter released a Henry Parker novella, The Hunters as a free e-book. Henry Parker, having closed a harrowing week, and Jack O'Donnell, "fresh out of rehab", must track down two "brutal, calculating" killers.

The Darkness

In the fifth Henry Parker book, The Darkness (2009, November 24), a young man is found beaten to death, his body dumped into New York's East River, and Henry suspects the victim has ties to his murdered brother.

== Zeke Bartholomew: SuperSpy ==
A humorous spy novel for Middle Grade readers about an ordinary boy who winds up in a plot where he has to save the world. "The beginning pulls the reader in and keeps him hooked with action-packed events throughout. The story line had me nervous, sad and excited to see what would happen next." --TIME for Kids

== Miracle ==
Inspired by his family's infertility struggles, he wrote the children's picture book Miracle. Originally intended just for friends and family, Pinter decided to release Miracle upon the urging of his wife who believed the book would resonate with other people on the same journey.

== Rachel Marin series ==
In 2020 Pinter published HIDE AWAY, the first book in his Rachel Marin series, which received positive reviews, including the Associated Press and starred reviews from Library Journal and Booklist, and was followed in 2021 by A STRANGER AT THE DOOR. which also received strong reviews.

== Bibliography ==
=== For adults ===
Henry Parker series:

The Mark (2007)
The Guilty (2008)
The Stolen (2009)
The Fury (2010)
The Hunters (novella - 2010)
The Darkness (2010)
Rachel Marin series:
Hide Away (2020)
A Stranger at the Door (2021)
Standalones:
The Castle (2017)

=== For Children ===
Zeke Bartholomew: Superspy (2011)
Miracle (2018)
