= Eli Cranor =

American author

Eli Cranor (born 1988) is an American author and former professional footballer. His debut novel, Don't Know Tough, won the Edgar Allan Poe Award for Best First Novel.

== Biography ==
Cranor was born in Forrest City, Arkansas on January 15, 1988, to Finley and Christy Cranor. He grew up in Russellville, Arkansas and graduated from Russellville High School.

Cranor attended Florida Atlantic University and played on the school's football team for a season in 2006, after which he transferred to Ouachita Baptist University. While there, he majored in English literature.

Cranor was recruited as a player-coach for the Swedish-American football team the Carlstad Crusaders and played with the team for nine months. After meeting his wife, he moved back to Arkansas.

In Arkansas, Cranor began teaching at a high school in the Russellville School District, where he also coached the football team.

In 2022, Cranor published his debut novel, Don't Know Tough, which received multiple awards nominations and was lauded by critics. The novel was followed by Ozark Dogs in 2023 and Broiler in 2024.

Cranor lives in Arkansas with his wife and children.

== Awards and honors ==
In 2022, USA Today included Don't Know Tough on their list of the year's best books. CrimeReads included it on their list of the year's best crime novels, and The New York Times included it on their list of the year's best mystery novels. Booklist included it on their "Top 10 Debut Mysteries & Thrillers" list.

The following year, CrimeReads,The Guardian, The New York Times included Ozark Dogs on their list of the year's best crime novels. The Sun Sentinel included it on their list of the year's best mystery fiction.

Awards for Cranor's writing
Year	Title	Award	Result	Ref.
2022	Don't Know Tough	Hammett Prize	Finalist	
2023	Don't Know Tough	Strand Magazine Award for Best Debut	Finalist	
2023	Don't Know Tough	Barry Award for Best First Novel	Finalist	
2023	Don't Know Tough	Anthony Award for Best First Novel	Finalist	
2023	Don't Know Tough	Lefty Award for Best Debut Mystery	Finalist	
2023	Don't Know Tough	Edgar Allan Poe Award for Best First Novel	Winner	
2024	Ozark Dogs	Barry Award for Best Novel	Finalist	
2024	Ozark Dogs	CWA Ian Fleming Steel Dagger	Finalist	

== Publications ==
- Don't Know Tough. Soho Crime. 2022. ISBN 9781641293457.
- Ozark Dogs. Soho Crime. 2023. ISBN 9781641294539.
- Broiler. Soho Crime. 2024. ISBN 9781641295901.
