= Matthew Betley =

American writer

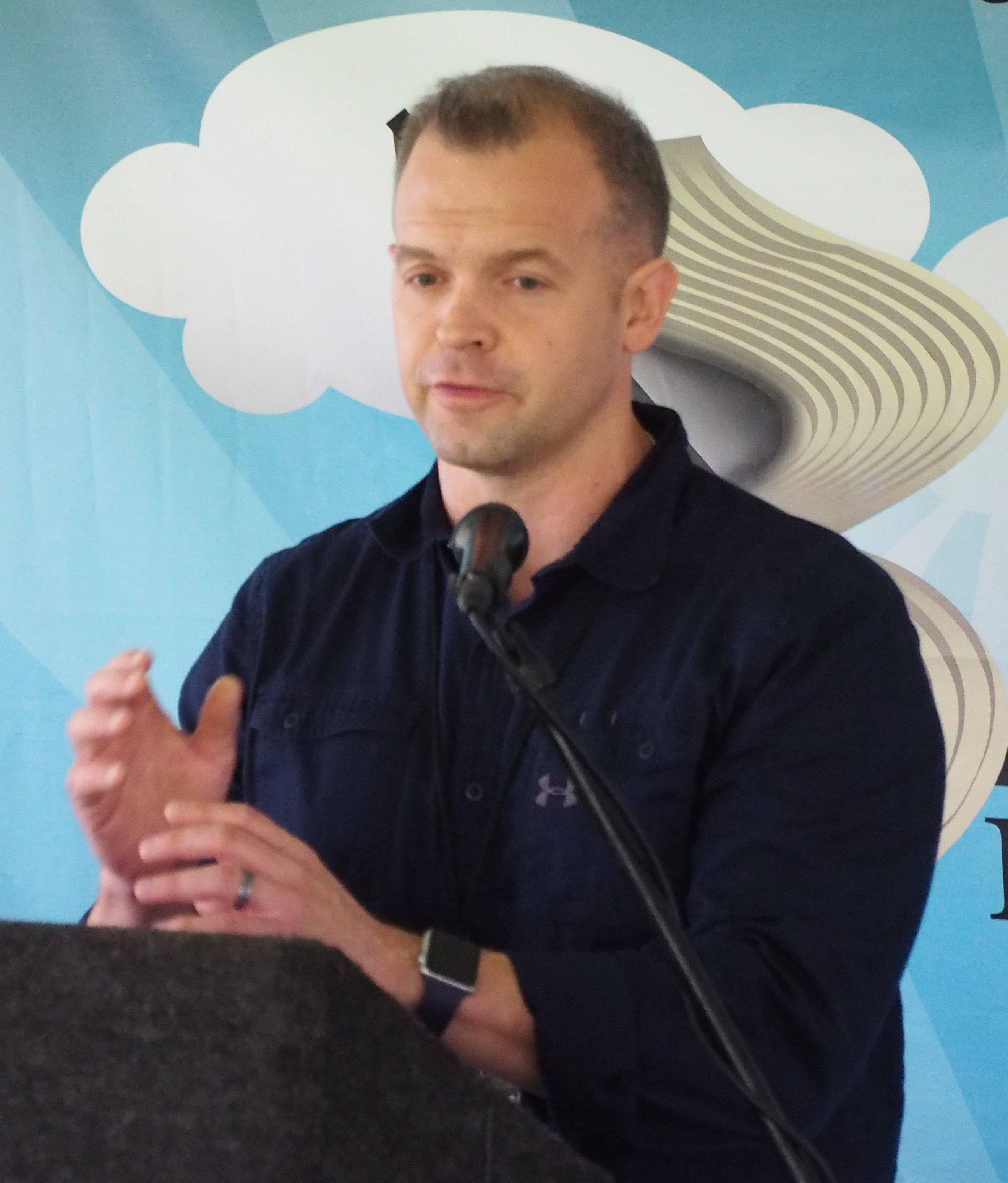
- Born: Matthew J Betley; New Jersey, U.S.
- Education: Miami University (BA)
- Occupations: Writer, novelist
- Writing career
- Language: English
- Period: 2016–present
- Subject: action thriller

Matthew Betley is an American former Marine and thriller novelist.

== Biography ==
=== Early life and education ===
Matthew Betley was born in New Jersey. He graduated from St. Xavier High School in Cincinnati in 1990. He studied psychology, political science, and sociology at Miami University in Oxford, Ohio, graduating in 1994 with a B.A. in psychology. He interned for the Public Defender's office in Washington DC, investigating felony murder cases, in his first semester.

=== Early career ===
Upon graduation he joined the Marine Corps instead of attending law school. He trained as a ground intelligence and infantry officer, and once commanded a scout sniper platoon. He deployed to Africa after 9/11 and then Iraq in 2006. Betley left the Marines in 2009. He is also a recovering alcoholic 8+ years sober and speaks openly about his experiences with addiction.

=== Writing and media career ===
Matt reportedly got so bored with a best-seller he was reading that he decided to write a book that could be much better. In 2017, his novel Overwatch was named a finalist for the Barry Award for Best Thriller.

== Bibliography ==
=== Logan West Series ===
Betley wrote the Logan West series about Logan is a US Marine Corps veteran who achieved the rank of captain. He was posted in Iraq, where he lost some of his men in an ambush. He is recovering alcoholic, who used alcohol to ease his nightmares.

| Publication year | Storyline order | Title | ISBN | Author |
|---|---|---|---|---|
| 2016 | 1 | Overwatch | ISBN 978-1476799216 | Matthew Betley |
| 2017 | 2 | Oath of Honor | ISBN 978-1476799254 | Matthew Betley |
| 2018 | 3 | Field of Valor | ISBN 978-1501161988 | Matthew Betley |
| 2019 | 4 | Rules of War | ISBN 978-1501162022 | Matthew Betley |
