= James Swain =

American novelist

- Born: June 7, 1956 (age 70)
- Occupation: Writer
- Spouse: Laura
- Writing career
- Genres: Crime novels, Mystery novels
- Website: www.jamesswain.com

James Swain (born June 7, 1956) is an American crime fiction author and magician.

Swain has written at more than fifteen fiction and non-fiction books. Many have been translated into twelve languages. He has used two main characters in most of his crime related and mystery books. These are Tony Valentine, a private eye and Jack Carpenter, an ex-cop turned child rescuer. Swain is lesser known for his "Magic" non-fiction books which are self-published. Swain's recent books have been declared "Mysteries of the Year" by Publishers Weekly and Kirkus Reviews.

He has received two nominations for the Barry Award. In 2006, he was awarded the Prix Calibre 38 for best American Crime Fiction for his Tony Valentine series. He has received an award for his fiction from "Florida Book."

The "Tony Valentine" rights were purchased in 2009 by Langley Films for theatrical purposes. An agreement allows Swain to write the first screenplay adaptation.

Swain was researching a story about poker hustling for Men's Journal in 2009 and the team of hustlers he found agreed to let him write a series of novels based on their experiences after a five-year delay, leading to the "Billy Cunningham" series.

== Biography ==
Jim Swain lives in Odessa, Florida with his wife, Laura. One of his hobbies is gambling and gambling scams. Another is magic, because he once worked as a magician.

== Style ==
Swain has created two ex-police characters that have run in a series of mystery and crime related novels. The Tony Valentine character seem to face daily some type of cheater or scammer that involves gambling. The second character, Jack Carpenter, faces the dirtier side of life involving child abduction.

== Format ==
Swain uses four basic acts in most of his novels. His older book series run from the low 300 to the low 400 pages while the newer series run at 400 pages. His beat format for the older series is consistent with older crime novels. His recent series seem to use a 15 beat format that is consistent with current standards.

== Bibliography ==
=== Novels ===
- The Man Who Walked Through Walls, 1989 Hardback, St Martins Press, 260 pages, ISBN 0-312-03394-X ISBN 978-0-312-03394-1
- The Man Who Cheated Death, 2010 eBook, ASIN B0046LV7X8
- Dark Magic, 2012, Tor Books, ISBN 0-7653-2994-8 ISBN 978-0-7653-2994-3
- Shadow People, 2013, Tor Books, ISBN 9780765329950

Billy Cunningham series

Billy Cunningham is a cheater from Providence, Rhode Island who moved to Las Vegas and recruits his own team of cheaters to scam casinos. He's unusually moral for a conman and frequently refers to the "cheaters code" about helping other cheaters.

- Take Down, 2015 Paperback, Thomas & Mercer, ISBN 1-4778-2202-X ISBN 978-1-4778-2202-9 ASIN 147782202X
- Bad Action, 2016 Paperback, Thomas & Mercer, ISBN 1-5039-3521-3 ISBN 978-1-5039-3521-1 ASIN B017RBIZFQ

Tony Valentine series

The character Tony Valentine is a retired cop from New Jersey and more importantly from the beat of the casinos in Atlantic City. After settling in Florida he is lured to Las Vegas and makes an impact with his consultant skills against casino cheaters.

- Grift Sense, 2001 Hardback, 2005 Softback, Ballantine Books, 336 pages, Softback ISBN 0-345-48035-X ISBN 978-0-345-48035-4
- Funny Money, 2002 Hardback, 2007 Softback, Atria, 304 pages, ISBN 1-4165-7502-2 ISBN 978-1-4165-7502-3
- Sucker Bet, 2003 Hardback, 2004 Softback, Fawcett, 336 pages, ISBN 0-345-46323-4 ISBN 978-0-345-46323-4
- Loaded Dice, 2004 Hardback, 2005 Softback, Ballantine Books, 320 pages, Softback ISBN 0-345-46327-7 ISBN 978-0-345-46327-2
- Mr. Lucky, 2005 Hardback, 2007 Softback, Ballantine Books, 432 pages, Softback ISBN 0-345-47545-3 ISBN 978-0-345-47545-9
- Deadman's Poker, 2006 Hardback, 2006 Softback, Fawcett, 384 pages, ISBN 0-345-47549-6 ISBN 978-0-345-47549-7
- Deadman's Bluff, 2006 Hardback, 2004 Softback, Fawcett, Page 384, ISBN 0-345-47551-8 ISBN 978-0-345-47551-0
- Wild Card, 2010 eBook, ASIN B0045EOJL8
- Jackpot, 2010 eBook, ASIN B00466HRS2

Jack Carpenter series

Jack Carpenter is an ex-cop from South Florida who was terminated because of using excessive force to a criminal. He turns to private eye work with a soft touch for children.

- Midnight Rambler, 2007 hardback, 2008, softback, Ballantine Books, 400 pages, Softback ISBN 0-345-47547-X ISBN 978-0-345-47547-3
- The Night Stalker, 2008 hardback, 2009 softback, Ballantine books, 400 pages, Softback ISBN 0-345-47553-4 ISBN 978-0345475534
- The Night Monster, 2009 hardback, Ballantine books, 400 pages, Hardback ISBN 0-345-51546-3 ISBN 978-0-345-51546-9
- The Program, 2010 ebook, Ballantine books, ebook ASIN B0044XUV4O

=== Non-fiction ===
- Don't Blink: The Magic of James Swain, 1992, spiral-bound, self-published by J. Swain, ASIN B0006QRWUO
- Miracles with Cards, 1996 spiral-bound, 2010 hardback, self-published by J. Swain, ASIN B0032ZXEB2
- 21st Century Card Magic, 1999 spiral-bound, 2010 hardback, self-published by J. Swain, ASIN B0032ZZ2MG
