= Ian Hamilton (writer) =

Canadian mystery writer (born 1946)

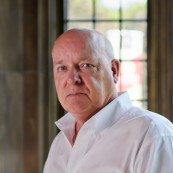
- Born: May 24, 1946 (age 80); Chirk, Wales
- Occupation: Novelist
- Writing career
- Genre: Mystery fiction
- Website: ianhamiltonbooks.com

William Ian Hamilton (born May 24, 1946) is a Canadian mystery writer. A former journalist and civil servant, he has had his work published in Maclean's, Boston, the Regina Leader-Post, the Calgary Albertan, and the Calgary Herald.

Hamilton is the author of the Ava Lee crime/mystery series. Ava Lee is a Chinese-Canadian forensic accountant who chases massive bad debts for a living. There are 16 books in the series as of 2024, and they have won several awards.

== Early life and career ==
Hamilton was born in Chirk, Wales, in 1946. His early education was in Scotland, and the balance and majority in Canada. He started his career as a journalist in Regina with the Leader-Post, and then worked at the Calgary Albertan and Calgary Herald before joining the Canadian government organization The Company of Young Canadians as Director of Communications. From there he worked at Information Canada (Director of Regional Operations), Consumer and Corporate Affairs (Regional Director for Ontario, Director of Communications), Fisheries and Oceans (Director-General of Communications and Policy Development), and External Affairs (Canadian Consul and Trade Commissioner for New England). He left the government to go into business, and ran several companies including The Rhyn Company, Seafood Selections and The All Natural Seafood Company. He worked in more than 30 countries.

== Writing ==
Hamilton is best known for his series of detective novels featuring forensic accountant Ava Lee, which are based in part on his experiences in various countries around the world, particularly in southeast Asia. Ava Lee is a Chinese Canadian lesbian forensic accountant, and the novels have been embraced by the Chinese Canadian community and by lesbian readers. As of 2012, the first book in the series, The Water Rat of Wanchai, was in the process of being adapted for film, with the screenplay written by Karen Walton.

== Awards and honours ==
His first book, The Children's Crusade, was non-fiction and was the Canadian Book of the Month Club Main Selection. The Water Rat of Wanchai won the Arthur Ellis Award for Best First Crime Novel.; it was a Quill and Quire top five novel of the year; an Amazon editor's pick and an Amazon top 100 book of the year; and a Toronto Star top five novel of the year. It was also shortlisted for the CBC Bookie Award.

The Disciple of Las Vegas was short listed for the Barry Award as the best original paperback published in the United States in 2014. The Wild Beasts of Wuhan was shortlisted for the Lambda Literary Award as best lesbian crime/mystery novel of 2013.

BBC Culture named Hamilton as one of the ten mystery/crime writers from the last 30 years that should be on your bookshelf.

He has also written for magazines such as Macleans, Saturday Night and Boston.

== Movies and TV ==
All of the Ava Lee books have been optioned for film, and a TV series is currently in development for a joint Canadian/American network partnership.

== Books ==
=== Non-fiction ===
- The Children's Crusade (1970)

=== Ava Lee Series ===
- The Water Rat of Wanchai (2011)
- The Disciple of Las Vegas (2011)
- The Wild Beasts of Wuhan (2011)
- The Red Pole of Macau (2012)
- The Scottish Banker of Surabaya (2013)
- The Dragon Head of Hong Kong (novella - prequel to the series) (2013)
- The Two Sisters of Borneo (2014)
- The King of Shanghai (2014)
- The Princeling of Nanjing (2015)
- The Couturier of Milan (2017)
- The Imam of Tawi-Tawi (2018)
- The Goddess of Yantai (2018)
- The Mountain Master of Sha Tin (2019)
- The Diamond Queen of Singapore (2020)
- The Sultan of Sarawak (2022)
- The General of Tiananmen Square (2023)
- The Fury of Beijing (2024)

=== Uncle Chow Tung Series ===
- Fate: An Uncle Chow Tung Novel (2019)
- Foresight: The Lost Decades of Uncle Chow Tung (2020)
- Fortune: The Lost Decades of Uncle Chow Tung (2021)
- Finale: The Lost Decades of Uncle Chow Tung (2022)
