= Jay MacLarty =

American novelist

- Born: Jay Hector MacLarty; December 30, 1943; Spirit Lake, Iowa, U.S.
- Died: December 23, 2010 (aged 66)
- Occupations: Entrepreneur; novelist

Jay Hector MacLarty (December 30, 1943 – December 23, 2010) was an American entrepreneur and novelist.

MacLarty was born in Spirit Lake, Iowa. His early years were spent in Iowa, Nebraska, and Minnesota. By the time he was thirty he had owned restaurants, nightclubs, and liquor stores, then founded a string of retail stores and a software company. He wrote one of the first computerized handicapping programs for thoroughbred racing.

He decided to take time off from his software business and write fiction. Unable to sell his first effort, a thousand-page novel, he decided to write a popular book. This resulted in a series of four paperback thrillers published by Simon & Schuster.

These are:

- The Courier (2003) ISBN 0-7434-6489-3
- Bagman (2004) ISBN 0-7434-6490-7
- Live Wire (2006) ISBN 978-1-4165-0347-7
- Choke Point (2007) ISBN 978-1-4165-0348-4

Each novel was nominated for a Barry Award and features Simon Leonidovitch as protagonist, a professional courier who takes assignments that become dangerous. The second book in the series (Bagman) received a starred review in Publishers Weekly.

MacLarty was a leader of the Las Vegas Writer's Group, formed to help local writers advance their careers.
