= A. D. Scott =

Scottish author

- Born: Ann Deborah Nolan; 20th century Scottish Highlands, Scotland
- Education: Inverness Royal Academy; Royal Scottish Academy of Music and Drama
- Occupations: Writer, novelist
- Writing career
- Genre: Mystery
- Notable work: Highland Gazette Mystery Series

Ann Deborah Nolan (born 20th century), also known by the pen name A. D. Scott, is a Scottish writer.

Scott is known for her Highland Gazette Mystery Series.

== Early life and education ==
Scott was born in the Scottish Highlands.

She attended Inverness Royal Academy and the Royal Scottish Academy of Music and Drama.

== Career ==
The Highland Gazette Mystery Series consists of the following novels: A Small Death in the Great Glen (2010), A Double Death on the Black Isle (2011), Beneath the Abbey Wall (2012), North Sea Requiem (2013), The Low Road (2014), and A Kind of Grief (2015).

The first three novels were finalists for the Barry Award for Best Paperback Original.

In 2015, Kirkus Reviews included A King of Grief on their list of the year's best mystery and thriller novels.

=== Selected works ===
- A Small Death in the Great Glen. Atria Books. 2010. ISBN 9781439154939.
- A Double Death on the Black Isle. Atria Books. 2011. ISBN 9781439154946.
- Beneath the Abbey Wall. Atria Books. 2012. ISBN 9781451665772.
- North Sea Requiem. Atria Books. 2013. ISBN 9781451665796.
- The Low Road. Atria Books. 2014. ISBN 9781476756165.
- A Kind of Grief. Atria Books. 2015. ISBN 9781476756189.
