= Rennie Airth =

South African novelist (1935–2025)

- Born: 1935
- Died: September, 2025; Johannesburg, South Africa
- Writing career
- Notable awards: Grand Prix de Littérature Policière; 2000 River of Darkness

Rennie Airth (1935 — September 2025) was a South African novelist who resided in Italy most of his life. Airth also worked as foreign correspondent for the Reuters news service.

Airth died in September 2025

== Novels ==
His works include Snatch! (1969), Once A Spy (1981), and a series of murder mysteries set in England between 1921 and 1949 featuring Detective Inspector John Madden of Scotland Yard (later retired). The first of these, River of Darkness (1999), won the Grand Prix de Littérature Policière for best international crime novel in 2000 and was nominated for Edgar, Anthony, and Macavity awards in the States. Airth found inspiration for that tale in a scrapbook about his uncle, a soldier killed in World War I. A sequel, The Blood-Dimmed Tide, was published in 2003, and a third book, The Dead of Winter, in 2009. Although Airth initially intended to write a trilogy about Madden, in 2014 he produced a fourth entry in the series, The Reckoning, and followed that with The Death of Kings (2017).

== Awards ==
Awards for Airth's writing
Year	Title	Award	Result	Ref.
2000	River of Darkness	Anthony Award for Best Novel	Finalist	
2000	River of Darkness	Barry Award for Best British Crime Novel	Finalist	
2000	River of Darkness	Dilys Award	Finalist	
2000	River of Darkness	Edgar Award for Best Novel	Finalist	
2000	River of Darkness	Grand Prix de Littérature Policière	Winner	
2000	River of Darkness	Historical Dagger Award	Finalist	
2000	River of Darkness	Macavity Award for Best Mystery Novel	Finalist	
2006	The Blood-Dimmed Tide	Barry Award for Best British Crime Novel	Finalist	
2009	The Dead of Winter	Historical Dagger Award	Finalist	

== Publications ==
- Snatch (1969)
- Once A Spy (1981)
- Detective Inspector John Madden
  - River of Darkness (1999)
  - The Blood-Dimmed Tide (2004)
  - The Dead of Winter (2009)
  - The Reckoning (2014)
  - The Death of Kings (2017)
  - The Decent Inn of Death (2020)
