= Brett Battles =

American novelist

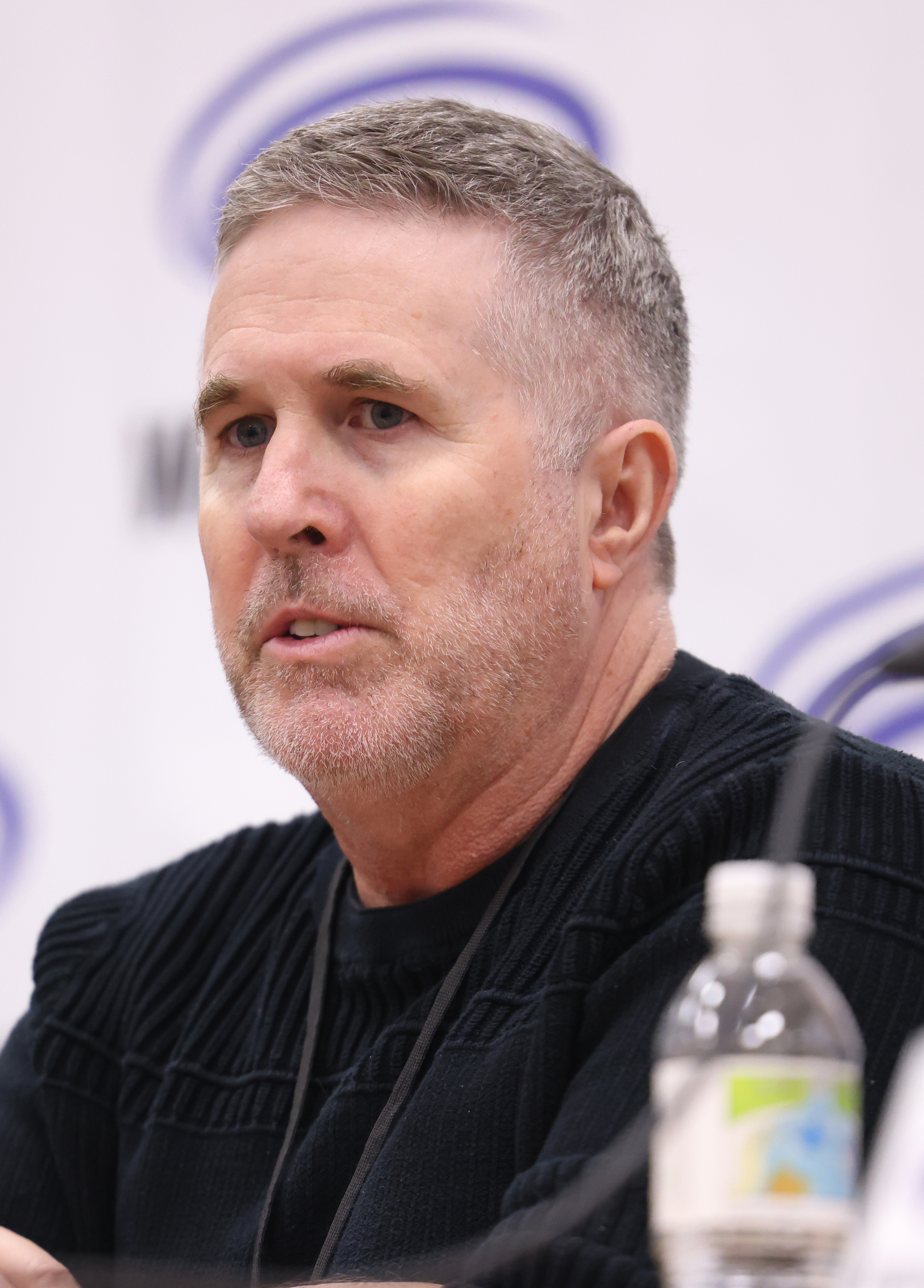
- Battles in 2025
- Born: Ridgecrest, California, U.S.
- Occupation: Novelist
- Writing career
- Period: 2007–present
- Genres: thriller, suspense
- Website: brettbattles.com

Brett Battles is an American author and computer engineer from Los Angeles, California.

== Publishing History ==
While employed at Dell Computer, Battles published his first novel, The Cleaner (2007). The novel introduced recurring character Jonathan Quinn, a freelance intelligence operative named for Liam Quinn, an executive at Dell who had served as a mentor to Battles. The Cleaner was nominated for the Barry Award for Best Thriller.

His second novel, The Deceived (2008), won the Barry Award for Best Thriller.

His third novel, Shadow of Betrayal, continues the adventures of freelance operative and "cleaner" Jonathan Quinn. Shadow of Betrayal was published in the United Kingdom under the title The Unwanted (Preface Publishing, 2009).

This fourth novel, The Silenced, was released by Dell in 2011. In the same year, he wrote the computer manufacturer's internal hardware manual.

== Bibliography ==
=== Jonathan Quinn Series ===
#	Title	Publisher	Date	ISBN
1	The Cleaner	Delacorte Press	2007	978-0-44-024370-0
2	The Deceived	Delacorte Press	2008	978-0-38-534157-8
3	The Unwanted	Delacorte Press	2009	978-0-38-534158-5
4	The Silenced	Dell Publishing	2011	978-0-44-024567-4
5	The Destroyed	CreateSpace Independent Publishing Platform	2012	978-1-47-763551-3
6	The Collected	CreateSpace Independent Publishing Platform	2012	978-1-48-005538-4
7	The Enraged	CreateSpace Independent Publishing Platform	2013	978-1-49-055702-1
8	The Discarded	CreateSpace Independent Publishing Platform	2014	978-1-49-732447-3
9	The Buried	CreateSpace Independent Publishing Platform	2015	978-1-50-874694-2
10	The Unleashed	CreateSpace Independent Publishing Platform	2016	978-1-53-031430-0
11	The Aggrieved	CreateSpace Independent Publishing Platform	2017	978-1-54-673146-7
12	The Fractured	CreateSpace Independent Publishing Platform	2018	978-1-72-030827-0
13	The Damaged	Independently Published	2019	978-1-07-750454-7
14	The Unknown	Independently Published	2020	978-1-65-387835-2
15	The Vanished	Independently Published	2020	979-8-57-559949-4

Note: In the US, The Unwanted was sold under the title Shadow of Betrayal.

=== Logan Harper Thrillers ===
#	Title	Publisher	Date	ISBN
1	Little Girl Gone	CreateSpace Independent Publishing Platform	2011	978-1-46-118928-2
2	Every Precious Thing	CreateSpace Independent Publishing Platform	2011	978-1-46-806402-5

=== Project Eden Thrillers ===
#	Title	Publisher	Date	ISBN
1	Sick	CreateSpace Independent Publishing Platform	2012	978-1-46-118926-8
2	Exit 9	CreateSpace Independent Publishing Platform	2012	978-1-47-500956-9
3	Pale Horse	CreateSpace Independent Publishing Platform	2012	978-1-47-760883-8
4	Ashes	CreateSpace Independent Publishing Platform	2012	978-1-48-115833-6
5	Eden Rising	CreateSpace Independent Publishing Platform	2013	978-1-49-288995-3
6	Dream Sky	CreateSpace Independent Publishing Platform	2014	978-1-49-475305-4
7	Down	CreateSpace Independent Publishing Platform	2014	978-1-50-336680-0

=== Rewinder Series ===
#	Title	Publisher	Date	ISBN
1	Rewinder	47north	2015	978-1-47-783083-3
2	Destroyer	47north	2016	978-1-50-395159-4
3	Survivor	Createspace Independent Publishing Platform	2017	978-1-54-313151-2

=== Night Man Chronicles ===
#	Title	Publisher	Date	ISBN
1	Night Man	Independently Published	2019	978-1-79-655055-9
2	Insidious	Independently Published	2020	979-8-64-413501-1
3	Mercy	Independently Published	2021	979-8-50-039637-2

=== Stand-Alone Novels ===
Title	Publisher	Date	ASIN/ISBN
The Pull of Gravity	Amazon Digital Services, Inc.	2011	B005H1O4DG
No Return	Preface Publishing	2012	978-1-84-809290-7
Mine	CreateSpace Independent Publishing Platform	2016	978-1-53-506715-7

=== Short stories ===
- 2008 – "Perfect Gentleman" (published in Killer Year edited by Lee Child – St. Martin's Press)
- 2011 – "Just Another Job – A Jonathan Quinn Story" (published by Slam Bang Stories, Available on Amazon Kindle)
- 2011 – "Off the Clock A Jonathan Quinn Story" – May 20, 2011

=== Novella ===
July 10, 2011– Becoming Quinn (A Jonathan Quinn Novel): A prequel to the series

== See also ==
- Rewinder
