= Danielle Girard =

American author

- Education: Cornell University
- Known for: Author
- Website: daniellegirard.com

Danielle Girard is an American author. She primarily writes in the suspense and women’s fiction genres. Among her novels and audiobooks with strong sales and reviews are Cold Silence, Chasing Darkness, and Whiteout.

Girard has won two awards for her work: a 2003 Barry Award for Cold Silence, and Chasing Darkness won a Romantic Times Reviewers' Choice Award.

Girard also runs Killer Women, a podcast where she hosts discussions with other female crime fiction authors.

== Bibliography ==
=== The Rookie Club series ===
- Dead Center (2006)
- One Clean Shot (2012)
- Dark Passage (2013)
- Grave Danger (2014)
- Everything to Lose (2015)
- Too Close to Home: A Rookie Club Short Story

=== Dr. Schwartzman series ===
- Exhume (2016)
- Excise (2017)
- Expose (2018)
- Expire (2019)
- The Ex (2022)

=== Badlands Thriller series ===
- White Out (2020)
- Far Gone (2021)
- Up Close (2023)

=== Other works ===
- Savage Art (2000)
- Ruthless Game (2001)
- Chasing Darkness (2002)
- Cold Silence (2002)
- Pinky Swear (2026)
