= Bob Truluck =

American novelist (born 1949)

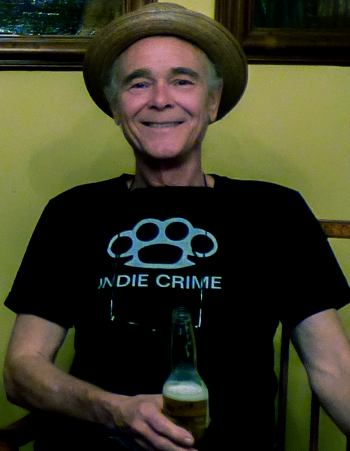
- Bob Truluck
- Born: July 28, 1949 (age 77); Georgia, USA
- Died: November 2, 2024; Tallahassee, FL
- Occupation: Novelist
- Writing career
- Genres: Crime fiction, noir fiction
- Notable awards: Shamus (2001)
- Website: bobtruluck.com

Bob Truluck (July 28, 1949 - November 2, 2024) was an American crime and noir novelist. In 1999, Truluck won the St. Martin's Press/Private Eye Writers of America Award for Best First Private Eye Novel. In 2001, he received the Shamus Award for Best First Private Investigator Novel. He was also nominated for a Barry Award and two Anthony Awards.

== Bibliography ==
=== Duncan Sloan series ===
- Street Level. New York: St. Martin's Minotaur. 2000.
- Saw Red. Tucson: Dennis McMillan Publications. 2003. ISBN 978-0-939767-45-8.
- Flat White. Orlando: Murmur House Press. 2015.

=== Other novels ===
- The Art of Redemption: A Novel. Tucson: Dennis McMillan Publications. 2007. ISBN 978-0-939767-56-4.
- The Big Nothing. Orlando: Murmur House Press. 2016.

=== Short stories ===
- McMillan, Dennis, ed. (2002). "A Man Called Ready". Measures of Poison. Tucson: Dennis McMillan Publications.
- Phillips, Gary, ed. (2012). "Digital Dingus Four-Point-o". Scoundrels: Tales of Greed, Murder and Financial Crimes. Lutz: Down and Out Books.

== Awards ==
- Winner: 1999 Private Eye Writers of America/St. Martin's Press – Best First Private Eye Novel Contest, for Street Level
- Winner: 2001 Shamus Award (Best First P.I. Novel), for Street Level
- Nominee: 2001 Anthony Award (Best First Mystery Novel), for Street Level
- Nominee: 2001 Barry Award (Best First Novel), for Street Level
- Nominee: 2003 Anthony Award (Best Short Story), for A Man Called Ready
- Nominee: 2016 Hammett Prize, for The Big Nothing
