= Stan Jones (mystery writer) =

American novelist

Stan Jones (born 1947) is an American writer of mystery novels, and is co-author of a non-fiction oral history book about the Exxon Valdez oil spill.

Jones was born in Anchorage, Alaska, where he lives today. All of his books to date are set in Alaska.

He has written seven books in the Nathan Active mystery series. In order of publication, they are

- White Sky, Black Ice
- Shaman Pass
- Frozen Sun
- Village of the Ghost Bears
- Tundra Kill
- The Big Empty (with Patricia Watts)
- Ghost Light (with Patricia Watts)

He is also the co-author (with Sharon Bushell) of The Spill: An Oral History of the Exxon Valdez Disaster.
