= John Lawton (author) =

Television producer and director

- Born: 1949 (age 76–77); England
- Occupation: Novelist
- Writing career
- Pen name: John Lawton
- Period: 1987–present
- Genres: Espionage, Crime, Historical

John Lawton is a television producer/director and author of historical/crime/espionage novels set primarily in Britain during World War II and the Cold War.

== Biography ==
Lawton worked briefly in London publishing prior to becoming, by the mid-1980s, a documentary television producer at the newly-created Channel 4. In 1993 he moved to New York, and in 1995 won a WH Smith Literary Award for his third book Black Out. He returned in 2001 with Riptide (American title: Bluffing Mr. Churchill). In 2008 he was named in the Daily Telegraph as one of "50 Crime Writers To Read Before You Die". In 2010 he was named in the New York Times Review's "Pick of the Year" for his novel A Lily of the Field. His author biography notes that "since 2000 he has lived in the high, wet hills of Derbyshire England, with frequent excursions into the high, dry hills of Arizona and Italy."

== Books ==
=== Frederick Troy novels ===
The detective in this series, Frederick Troy, works at Scotland Yard, and is the younger son of a Russian immigrant father who has become a wealthy newspaper publisher and baronet.

- Black Out (1995), ISBN 978-0-670-85767-8, set in 1944
- Old Flames (1996), ISBN 978-0-87113-864-4, set in 1956
- A Little White Death (1998), ISBN 978-0-7538-2261-6, set in the early 1960s
- Riptide (2001), ISBN 978-0-297-64345-6 (published in the United States (2004) as Bluffing Mr. Churchill), set in the Second World War
- Blue Rondo (2005), ISBN 978-0-87113-698-5, (published in the United States as Flesh Wounds), set in the Second World War and the 1950s
- Second Violin (2007), ISBN 978-0-297-85196-7, set in 1938
- A Lily of the Field (2010), ISBN 978-0-8021-1956-8, set partly in 1934–46 and partly in 1948
- Friends and Traitors (2017), ISBN 978-0-8021-2706-8, set in 1958
- Smoke and Embers (2025), ISBN 978-0-8021-6489-6

=== Joe Wilderness novels ===
The Joe Wilderness novels are historical thrillers, set in Cold War Europe.

- Then We Take Berlin (2013) ISBN 978-0802121967
- The Unfortunate Englishman (2016) ISBN 978-0802123992
- Hammer to Fall (2020) ISBN 978-1611856354
- Moscow Exile (2023) ISBN 978-0802158024

=== Other fiction ===
- Sweet Sunday (2002) ISBN 978-0-7528-4270-7
- East of Suez, West of Charing Cross Road (included in Agents of Treachery anthology, Otto Penzler editor, 2010) ISBN 978-0-307-47751-4
- Bentinck's Agent (2013)

=== Non-fiction ===
- 1963 Five Hundred Days: History As Melodrama (1992) ISBN 978-0-340-50846-6

=== Television ===
- A Walk up 5th Avenue
- Christians in Palestine
- Free and Fair
- 25th Anniversary of the Mersey Poets (with Brian Patten)
- Green Thoughts (with Gore Vidal)
- O Superman (with Harold Pinter)
