= June Thomson =

English crime novelist (c. 1930 – 2022)

- Born: June Valerie Thomson c. 1930; Rettendon, Essex, England
- Died: 2022
- Education: Bedford College University of London
- Children: 2
- Writing career
- Genre: Crime

June Valerie Thomson (c. 1930–2022) was an English detective novelist.

== Life and career ==
A former teacher, Thomson was educated at Chelmsford High School and Bedford College University of London. She was the creator of the Chief Inspector Jack Finch (Inspector Rudd in American editions) and Sergeant Tom Boyce series of novels. From 1990 she also wrote a series of Sherlock Holmes pastiche collections of short stories. Her works have been translated into many languages. June Thomson previously lived in St. Albans in Hertfordshire and later lived in Rugby. She was a mother of two sons. June Thomson died in 2022.

== Bibliography ==
=== Chief Inspector Jack Finch/Inspector Rudd ===
- Not One of Us (1971)
- Death Cap (1973)
- The Long Revenge (1974)
- Case Closed (1977)
- A Question of Identity (1977)
- Deadly Relations (aka The Habit of Loving) (1979)
- Alibi in Time (1980)
- Shadow of a Doubt (1981)
- To Make a Killing (aka Portrait of Lilith) (1982)
- Sound Evidence (1984)
- A Dying Fall (1985)
- The Dark Stream (1986)
- No Flowers by Request (1987)
- Rosemary for Remembrance (1988)
- The Spoils of Time (1989)
- Past Reckoning (1990)
- Foul Play (1991)
- Burden of Innocence (1996)
- The Unquiet Grave (2000)
- Going Home (2006)

=== Sherlock Holmes ===
1. The Secret Files of Sherlock Holmes (1990)
  1. The Case of the Vanishing Head-Waiter
  2. The Case of the Amateur Mendicants
  3. The Case of the Remarkable Worm
  4. The Case of the Exalted Client
  5. The Case of the Notorious Canary Trainer
  6. The Case of the Itinerant Yeggman
  7. The Case of the Abandoned Lighthouse
2. The Secret Chronicles of Sherlock Holmes (1992)
  1. The Case of the Paradol Chamber
  2. The Case of the Hammersmith Wonder
  3. The Case of the Maplestead Magpie
  4. The Case of the Harley Street Specialist
  5. The Case of the Old Russian Woman
  6. The Case of the Camberwell Poisoning
  7. The Case of the Sumatran Rat
3. The Secret Journals of Sherlock Holmes (1993)
  1. The Case of the Millionaire's Persecution
  2. The Case of the Colonel's Madness
  3. The Case of the Addleton Tragedy
  4. The Case of the Shopkeeper's Terror
  5. The Case of the Friesland Outrage
  6. The Case of the Smith-Mortimer Succession
  7. The Case of the Maupertuis Scandal
4. Holmes and Watson: A Study in Friendship (1995)
5. The Secret Documents of Sherlock Holmes (1999)
  1. The Case of the Ainsworth Abduction
  2. The Case of the Boulevard Assassin
  3. The Case of the Wimbledon Tragedy
  4. The Case of the Ferrers Documents
  5. The Case of the Vatican Cameos
  6. The Case of the Camberwell Deception
  7. The Case of the Barton Wood Murder
6. The Secret Notebooks of Sherlock Holmes (2004)
  1. The Case of the Upwood Scandal
  2. The Case of the Aluminium Crutch
  3. The Case of the Manor House Mystery
  4. The Case of the Cardinal's Corpse
  5. The Case of the Arnsworth Affair
  6. The Case of the Vanishing Barque
  7. The Case of the Gustaffson Stonel
7. The Secret Archives of Sherlock Holmes (2012)
  1. The Case of the Conk-Singleton Forgery
  2. The Case of the Stray Chicken
  3. The Case of the Oneeyed Colonel
  4. The Case of the Threehanded Widow
  5. The Case of the Pentre Mawr Murder
  6. The Case of the Missing Belle Fille
  7. The Case of the Watchful Waiter
8. Sherlock Holmes and the Lady in Black (2015)

== Sources ==
- Biography : Editor's foreword in "Les Dossiers Secrets de Sherlock Holmes" ("The secret journals of Sherlock Holmes") Le Masque Les Reines du Crime Librairie des Champs Elysées 1995
