= Sweeping Up Glass =

2008 novel by Carolyn Wall

- First edition
- Author: Carolyn Wall
- Cover artist: Belina Huey
- Language: English
- Genre: Novel
- Publisher: Poisoned Pen Press
- Publication date: 2008
- Media type: Print (paperback)
- Pages: 327 pp (paperback)
- ISBN: 978-0-385-34303-9

Sweeping Up Glass is a 2008 novel by Oklahoma City author Carolyn Wall that takes place within a segregated community in 1938.

== Plot summary ==
Olivia Harker is a child unloved by her mother, Ida, who is mentally ill. However, her father, Tate, raises her and loves her a great deal while her mother is in a sanatorium. Tate also manages to run a grocery store and is a self-taught veterinarian. Ida is released from the sanitorium and returns home to her family. She immediately makes it clear to Olivia that she is a disappointment to her. Ida frequently abuses Olivia. Olivia's only source of friendship is the colored community within her town. She learns many things from them, including words of wisdom. Olivia has a child, Pauline, out of wedlock. Olivia and her father get into a horrible car accident that kills James Arnold. The accident leaves her terribly disfigured, though temporarily. Ida tells her that her father was killed in the crash. Despite these events, she gets married eventually. However, it is not to Pauline's father, who is unknown. Olivia's husband, Saul, builds a tarpaper shack for Ida. She has a relatively happy life despite her mother's constant madness and disapproval of her for 12 years before her husband dies. Pauline follows her mother's example by having a child, William, out of wedlock. When William is a baby, Pauline leaves to become a star in Hollywood.

Olivia grows closer to William over the years to the point that he is her sole source of joy. Her ultimate priority is to keep him safe. In 1938, Olivia reminisces about the grocery store and her father's work as a veterinarian. She recalls how people paid with provisions because of the harsh economic times. The segregation present within the community also stands out for her. She realizes that's it takes place even in her grocery store. There are separate days for whites and coloreds. One day, Pauline returns to take William. She wants to turn him into a child star so that he can support her. Olivia does not let Pauline take away William upon hearing her reasons.

Olivia owns a hill in which the only silver-faced wolves in Kentucky exist . People normally hunted on her land for food, which Olivia understood and respected. Out of nowhere, somebody starts killing the wolves for sport, while chopping off their right ears. Olivia eventually figures out that Alton Phelps is doing this. He thinks that Olivia knows a great secret about him and his friends because her father discovered it many years ago. However, this secret is unknown to her. Alton Phelps even goes so far as to threaten Olivia and William. Olivia begins to investigate this secret and discovers that Alton and his friends are Cott'ners. They are described them as the rejects of the KKK. The Cott'ners have been killing off the younger generations of coloreds in the town for years.

In the process of discovering this secret, Olivia discovers that her father is still alive and in prison for killing James Arnold. She discovers this around the time that the Cott'ners are hunting her down as well as her friends. Olivia goes to visit him in prison, while calling the Federal Marshall in the process. She then goes home and discovers some old books of her father's that details where the victims of the Cott'ners are buried. Eventually, the Federal Marshall comes and saves them. Tate is released from prison in exchange for testifying against the Cott'ners.

== Reviews ==
Publishers Weekly stated, as the action moves inexorably to its explosive conclusion, Olivia must come to grips with past betrayals, thereby earning a second chance at love, redemption and long overdue justice.

Library Journal stated, the suspense is gripping, the danger is very real, and the reader gets caught up in Wall's powerful, moving debut. Highly recommended for all collections O, The Oprah Magazine.

O, The Oprah Magazine stated, "this book is haunting, lyrical, entirely absorbing, Sweeping Up Glass deserves a place on the shelf next to classics like True Grit and To Kill A Mockingbird. Carolyn Wall is a brilliant storyteller and this book is a wonderful read."

== Awards ==
At the 20th annual Oklahoma Book Awards within the Oklahoma Heritage Museum, Sweeping Up Glass won the fiction award.
