= Deepti Kapoor =

Indian author and journalist

Deepti Kapoor (born 1980) is an Indian author and journalist currently based in Portugal. Her first novel, A Bad Character, was published in 2015. In 2023, Kapoor published her second novel, Age of Vice, whose rights were sold to FX Studio for a major TV series. Kapoor was born in Moradabad and lived in Delhi and Goa before moving to Lisbon.

== Education ==
Kapoor attended Welham Girls' School, an all-girls boarding school in Dehradun. She went on to pursue journalism at Delhi University, followed by a master's in social psychology.
