= Dan Fesperman =

American novelist

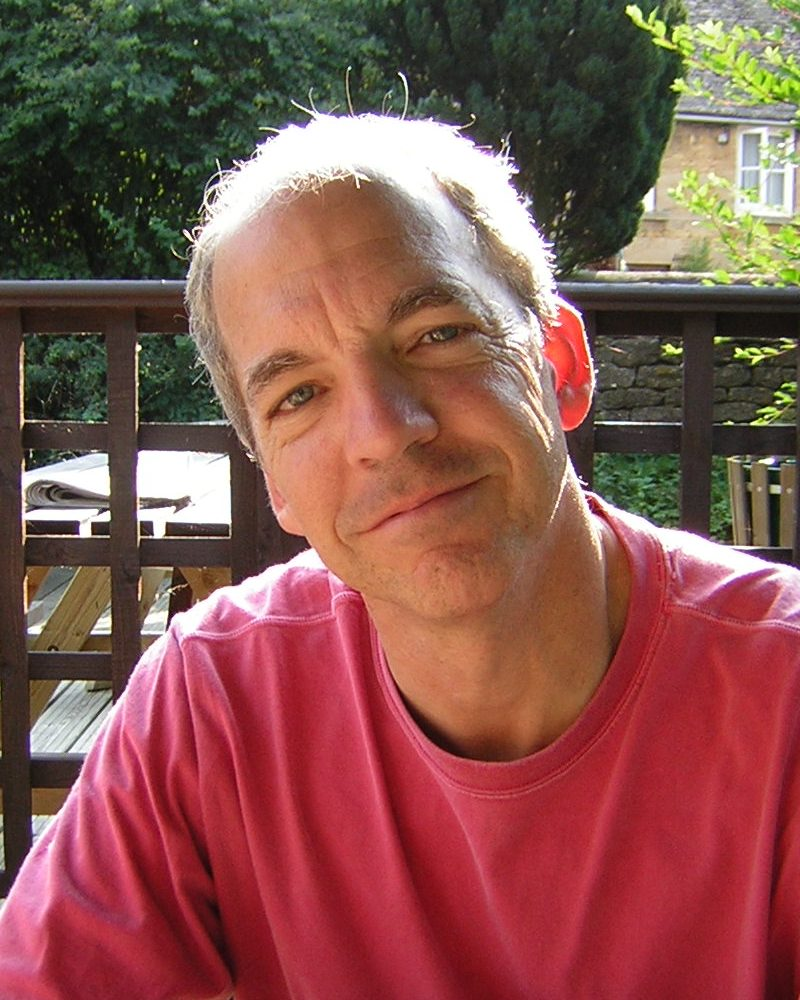
- Born: September 15, 1955 (age 70); Charlotte, North Carolina, U.S.
- Education: University of North Carolina
- Occupations: Reporter; author
- Spouse: Liz Bowie
- Children: 2
- Website: danfesperman.com

Dan Fesperman (born September 15, 1955, in Charlotte, North Carolina) is a former reporter for The Baltimore Sun and the author of several thrillers. The plots were inspired by the author's own international assignments in Germany, Bosnia, Afghanistan, Pakistan and the Middle East. He is a 1977 graduate of the University of North Carolina and lives in Baltimore, Maryland with his wife Liz Bowie, a reporter for The Baltimore Sun, and their two children.

== List of works ==
- Lie in the Dark, No Exit Press, 1999, ISBN 9781901982664
- The Small Boat of Great Sorrows, Black Swan, 2003, ISBN 9780552150231
- The Warlord's Son, Black Swan, 2004, ISBN 9780552150248
- The Prisoner of Guantanamo, Hodder & Stoughton, 2006, ISBN 9780340896815
- The Amateur Spy, Hodder & Stoughton, 2007, ISBN 9780340896839
- The Arms Maker of Berlin, Hodder & Stoughton, 2009, ISBN 9780340961261
- Layover in Dubai, Knopf, 2010, ISBN 9780307268389
- The Double Game, Knopf, 2012, ISBN 9780307700131
- Unmanned, Knopf, 2014, ISBN 9780857893444
- The Letter Writer, Knopf, 2016, ISBN 9781101875063
- Safe Houses, Knopf, 2018, ISBN 9780525520191
- The Cover Wife, Knopf, 2021, ISBN 9780525657835
- Winter Work, Knopf, 2022, ISBN 9780593321607
- Pariah: A Novel, Knopf, 2025, ISBN 978-0593802236

== Awards ==
- 1999 The John Creasey Memorial Dagger Award for best first novel, for Lie in the Dark
- 2003 The Ian Fleming Steel Dagger for best thriller, for The Small Boat of Great Sorrows
- 2006 The Hammett Prize, for The Prisoner of Guantánamo
