= Ben Rehder =

American novelist

Ben Rehder is an Austin-based author of mystery novels, including Buck Fever (2002), the first in his Blanco County mystery series, which was an Edgar Award finalist.

== Education ==
Rehder graduated from the University of Texas in 1986, and then entered the field of advertising.

== Blanco County series ==
The Blanco County series is about John Marlin, a game warden who partakes in homicide investigations. In addition to serving as mysteries, the series is also a humorous look at the hunting culture of Texas in a satiric style similar to Carl Hiaasen and Tim Dorsey. Publishers Weekly describes it as "confident and vigorous; the tone is quintessentially Texan and relentlessly wry".

1. (2002) Buck Fever
2. (2003) Bone Dry
3. (2004) Flat Crazy
4. (2005) Guilt Trip
5. (2007) Gun Shy
6. (2008) Holy Moly
7. (2014) Mind Game
8. (2014) Hog Heaven
9. (2014) Stag Party
10. (2015) Bum Steer
11. (2016) Point Taken
12. (2017) Dog Tag
13. (2017) Last Laugh
14. (2018) Lefty Loosey
15. (2020) Free Ride

== Roy Ballard books ==
1. (2012) Gone the Next
2. (2014) Get Busy Dying
3. (2015) If I had a Nickel
4. (2016) Now You See Him
5. (2018) A Tooth For a Tooth
6. (2019) Shake and Bake
7. (2020) Better To Be Lucky

== Standalone novels ==
1. (2012) The Chicken Hanger
2. (2012) The Driving Lesson
