= Caroline Carver (author) =

British thriller writer (born 1959)

Caroline (CJ) Carver (born in October 1959 in London) is a British author who has lived in the UK and Australia.

== Early life ==
Caroline Carver was born in London, UK in October 1959. Throughout her early years, she worked as a book rep and marketing manager for Transworld Publishers, taking time off to backpack through South-East Asia. Carver has been a travel writer and long-distance rally driver, driving from London to Saigon to Cape Town and covering 14,000 miles on the Inca Trail. Carver is a founding judge of the Women's World Car of The Year Award.

== Career ==
Carver's first novel, Blood Junction, won the CWA Debut Dagger, was shortlisted for the Barry Award, and was selected by Publishers Weekly as one of the best mystery books of the year. Spare Me The Truth (published 2016) was nominated for the Ngaio Marsh Award in 2017. Carver lives with her husband near Bath, England.

== Works ==
- 2001 – Blood Junction
- 2003 – Dead Heat
- 2004 – Black Tide
- 2005 – Beneath The Snow
- 2007 – Gone Without Trace
- 2009 – Back With Vengeance
- 2010 – The Honest Assassin
- 2016 – Spare Me The Truth
- 2017 – Tell Me A Lie
- 2018 – Know Me Now
- 2019 – Over Your Shoulder
- 2019 – Cold Echo
- 2020 – Deep Black Lies
- 2020 – The Snow Thief
- 2021 – Scare Me to Death
- 2023 – A Treachery of Friends
