= Owen Laukkanen =

Canadian thriller writer

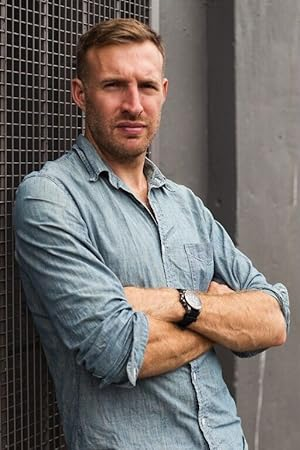
- Born: Owen Matthew Sellers Laukkanen; February 20, 1983 (age 43); Vancouver, British Columbia, Canada
- Education: Bachelor of Fine Arts
- Alma mater: University of British Columbia
- Occupations: writer, author
- Writing career
- Pen name: Owen Matthews
- Genres: mystery; crime fiction; detective; genre fiction; thriller; young adult
- Notable works: Stevens and Windermere Series, The Wild
- Website: owenlaukkanen.com

Owen Matthew Sellers Laukkanen (born February 20, 1983) is a Canadian mystery writer, the creator of the Stevens and Windermere series, among other novels. His first novel, The Professionals, was a finalist for the Anthony Award for Best First Novel at Bouchercon 2013, the annual World Mystery Convention. It was also listed as one of the top 100 novels of 2012 by Kirkus Reviews. Laukkanen lives in Vancouver, British Columbia.

== Background ==
Laukkanen was born in Vancouver, British Columbia, and raised in Windsor, Ontario. He graduated from the University of British Columbia with Bachelor of Fine Arts degree in creative writing in 2006. After graduation, finding work proved to be a challenge. He even applied to work as a driver for an escort agency, thinking it might provide interesting material for a novel. Finally he came across an ad in Craigslist looking for a writer to report on the World Series of Poker.

Although he knew nothing about poker, he was hired by PokerListings.com and jet-setted around the world for the next three years, covering matches in exotic locales like Monaco and Macau.

== First novel ==
Laukkanen began work on The Professionals in October 2009. The 2008 financial crisis brought unemployment to 10 percent in the United States. That situation and a chance viewing of a television program on kidnappers gave him the idea for the book. The novel centers around four university students who, because of their poor job prospects, decide to embark on a career of kidnapping. They rationalize that most kidnappings go wrong because kidnappers get greedy, kidnapping wealthy people and demanding huge ransoms. What if they played for small stakes, kidnapping wealthy individuals but asking for just $50–100,000? The ransom would be easy to get quickly in unmarked bills, and the stakes would be small enough that nobody would be bothered to pursue the matter further. "Far better to pull quick scores. Lower numbers, but higher volume. Snatch guys like Terry Harper, Martin Warner. Midlevel executives, hedge-fund managers, guys with enough money to make the job worthwhile, with families to pay the ransoms, but with no glamour to their names. No romance. Anonymous upper-class fellas who just wanted to see things returned to normal." The team moves from city to city for two years kidnapping people for small ransoms without getting caught or even pursued.

But Harper ignores the threats of harm to his family and goes to the police in spite of the stakes. The cops get involved. And then the kidnappers make a mistake. They kidnap someone who has underworld connections. Pretty soon they have both the mob and the cops on their tail.

Laukkanen didn't intend to create a novel series. But the two cops chasing the kidnappers, Kirk Stevens, an agent with Minnesota's Bureau of Criminal Apprehension, and Carla Windermere, an FBI agent, made such a great team that Laukkanen's publisher and agent urged him to continue with the duo as heroes in a continuing series.

Stevens is an older agent, happily married, while Windermere is a young and dynamic black woman. There is a subdued sexual chemistry between them as they work to solve the case.

== Subsequent novels ==
After six Windermere and Stevens novels, Laukkanen ventured into new territory with Gale Force in 2018. Laukkanen comes from a sea-faring family—his grandfather, uncle and father all were fishermen—and Gale Force is a story about the marine salvage business. The book introduces a new heroine, McKenna Rhodes, skipper of a salvage tug called the Gale Force, and her efforts to rescue a capsized freighter in the northern Pacific near Alaska's Aleutian Islands.

In 2019, Laukkanen published Deception Cove, a novel about an ex-marine, a widow, who was discharged with PTSD, and an ex-convict who team up to rescue a dog named Lucy. Lucy is also the name of Laukkanen's own dog. This was followed by Lone Jack Trail in 2020.

== Young Adult novels ==
Using the Pseudonym of Owen Matthews, Laukkanen has written two young adult novels: How to Win at High School, published in 2015, and The Fixes, published in 2016. His third Young Adult novel, The Wild (2021) was published under his name and was picked up for development with director Patrick Brice and HBO's streaming service Max.

== List of works ==
Laukkanen has been turning out at least one novel a year since 2012.

=== Stevens and Windermere series ===
- The Professionals (G. P. Putnam's Sons, 2012)
- Criminal Enterprise (G. P. Putnam's Sons, 2013)
- Kill Fee (G. P. Putnam's Sons, 2014)
- The Stolen Ones (G. P. Putnam's Sons, 2015)
- The Watcher in the Wall (G. P. Putnam's Sons, 2016)
- The Forgotten Girls (G. P. Putnam's Sons, 2017)

=== Neah Bay series ===
- Deception Cove (Little, Brown and Company, 2019)
- Lone Jack Trail (Little, Brown and Company, 2020)

=== Stand-alone novels ===
- Gale Force (G. P. Putnam's Sons, 2018)
- The Wild (Random House, 2021)

=== As Owen Matthews ===
- How to Win at High School (HarperCollinsTeen, 2015)
- The Fixes (HarperCollinsTeen, 2016)

== Plaudits for the novels ==
=== The Professionals ===
- One of the most assured new voices to hit the genre - Sarah Weinman, Maclean's Magazine
- Mr. Laukkanen has written a first-rate thriller. - Muriel Dobbin, The Washington Times
- Laukkanen's clever debut, the first in a new crime thriller series, compares favorably to Scott Smith's classic caper novel, A Simple Plan - Publishers Weekly
- A fast-moving debut thriller with enough twists to fill a pretzel bag....Let's hope Laukkanen writes more thrillers like this one - Kirkus Reviews

=== Criminal Enterprise ===
- The writing is so crisp, the pages almost want to turn themselves. He's a terrific storyteller. - Kirkus Reviews

=== Kill Fee ===
- A blistering pace and a stomach-turning homicide-for-hire scheme. - Publishers Weekly

=== The Stolen Ones ===
- Savage, cathartic...Laukkanen deftly mixes sharp social criticism with bleak white-knuckle suspense. - Publishers Weekly
- Here it is not the criminals who are intriguing, but rather the victims who turn out to be far stronger and more remarkable than originally anticipated. - Library Journal

=== The Watcher in the Wall ===
- A gut-wrenching tale filled with empathy for alienated teens. This may be the best yet in a first-rate series. - Kirkus Reviews

=== Gale Force ===
- Owen Laukkanen’s latest thriller features a riveting, tense, and blazing-fast plot. . . his Stevens & Windermere series is solid, but Gale Force is Laukkanen’s finest work so far. - Ryan Steck at The Real Book Spy
- Action-loving readers will be thrilled with this one. - Kirkus Reviews

== Award nominations ==
=== The Professionals ===
- Anthony Award: Best First Novel 2013 (nominated)
- Barry Award: Best First Novel 2013 (finalist)
- International Thriller Writers' Thriller Award: Best First Novel 2013 (nominated)
- Spinetingler Magazine Award: Best Novel New Voices 2013 (nominated)
- Kirkus Reviews Best Fiction of 2012

=== Criminal Enterprise ===
- International Thriller Writers' Thriller Award: Best Novel 2014 (nominated)

=== The Stolen Ones ===
- Barry Award: Best Novel 2016 (finalist)

=== The Wild ===
- Forest of Reading (Note: Canada’s largest recreational reading program administered by the Ontario Library Association) White Pine Award 2022 (nominated)
- Pacific Northwest Library Association Young Readers Choice Award (Note: The longest-running children’s choice book award and the only international award with young readers in both the United States and Canada participating in the program.) 2023 (Second Place)
