= Caz Frear =

British mystery fiction novelist

Caz Frear is a British mystery fiction novelist. Her 2018 work Sweet Little Lies was published after winning the Richard & Judy "Search for a Bestseller" competition in 2017.

== Cat Kinsella books ==
- Sweet Little Lies (2018)
- Stone Cold Heart (2019)
- Shed No Tears (2020)

== TV options ==
In 2017, Carnival Films purchased TV rights to Sweet Little Lies.

== Personal life ==
Frear grew up in Coventry, England and spent her teenage years dreaming of moving to London and writing a novel. After fulfilling her first dream, it wasn’t until she moved back to Coventry thirteen years later that the second finally came true. She has a degree in History & Politics.
