= Joseph R. Garber =

American author

- Born: August 14, 1943; Philadelphia, Pennsylvania, U.S.
- Died: May 27, 2005 (aged 61)
- Education: University of Virginia; East Tennessee State University
- Occupation: Author

Joseph R. Garber (August 14, 1943 – May 27, 2005) was an American author, best known for his 1995 thriller Vertical Run and for the articles he wrote on technology for Forbes magazine.

== Biography ==
Garber was born in Philadelphia, Pennsylvania, moving often as an army brat. He attended the University of Virginia, but quit to join the U.S. Army himself, eventually graduating from East Tennessee State University in 1968 with a philosophy degree.

Garber worked for AT&T as a business long-distance consultant and a writer for the AT&T in-house magazine. He then worked as a consultant for Booz Allen Hamilton for a decade, writing fiction and non-fiction freelance in his spare time. After a prolonged flu, he quit his job and moved to Woodside, California, where he wrote for Forbes magazine and as a consultant in Redwood City, California until he was laid off.

Garber had written a manuscript, In Search of Shabbiness, as a response to the Tom Peters best-seller, In Search of Excellence. On the advice of literary agents, he rewrote it as the novel Rascal Money.

In 1995, his second novel Vertical Run, a corporate thriller, became an international best-seller. The book's setting is 200 Park Avenue, the address of Booz Allen. It was bought by both Warner Bros and Jon Peters in the 1990s only to be shelved in pre-production. His third novel, In a Perfect State, was published in 1999. His fourth novel, Whirlwind, with a retired CIA agent as protagonist, was published in 2004.

Garber died of a heart attack on May 27, 2005.

== Books ==
- Garber, Joseph R. Rascal Money : a novel / Joseph R. Garber. Chicago : Contemporary Books, c1989. 412 p.; 25 cm. ISBN 0-8092-4285-0
- Garber, Joseph R. Vertical Run / Joseph R. Garber. New York : Bantam Books, 1995. 305 p.; 24 cm. ISBN 0-553-10033-5 (a Book-of-the-Month Club alternate selection)
- Garber, Joseph R. In a Perfect State / Joseph R. Garber. Great Britain : Pocket Books, 1999. 384 p.; 24 cm. ISBN 0-671-85467-4
- Garber, Joseph R. Whirlwind : a novel / Joseph R. Garber. 1st ed. New York : HarperCollins, c2004. 313 p.; 24 cm. ISBN 0-06-059650-3 (hardcover), ISBN 0-06-059652-X (paperback)

== Reviews ==
- Review of "Whirlwind" in The New York Times Free, but registration required.
- Review from Booklist of "Whirlwind" at Amazon.com
- Review by Publishers Weekly of Vertical Run at Amazon.com
- Reviews by Publishers Weekly and Library Journal of "Rascal Money" at Amazon.com

== See also ==
- Booz Allen Hamilton
