= Age of Vice =

2023 novel by Deepti Kapoor

- Author: Deepti Kapoor
- Language: English
- Publisher: HarperCollins
- Publication date: January 3, 2023

Age of Vice is a novel by Deepti Kapoor which was published on January 3, 2023 by HarperCollins.

== Plot ==
The novel is set in Delhi. It begins with a car crash caused by a wealthy man in New Delhi in 2004 which killed five people who sleeping on the road. Ajay, the man driving, was sent to jail and then he was attacked.

== Critical reception and reviews ==
Ron Charles of The Washington Post wrote "The most dazzling explosions to herald 2023 come from Deepti Kapoor’s novel “Age of Vice.”", Vandana Menon of ThePrint wrote "Age of Vice, is a hit even before its release." Sahana Hegde of Scroll.in wrote "I think Age of Vice is best described as a perfectly good book that only disappoints because you can so clearly see how it could have been a great one." Karthik Shankar of Live Mint wrote "Deepti Kapoor’s compulsively readable novel, ‘Age Of Vice’, is a gripping saga of wealth and violence" and Sanjay Sipahimalani of Moneycontrol wrote "Age of Vice, then, is an exhilaratingly ambitious novel that uses the conventions of a thriller to comment on ugly Indian realities arising from systemic inequality and all-pervasive backroom cronyism.".

The book has been also reviewed by Dwight Garner of The New York Times, Lorraine Berry of the Los Angeles Times, Susie Goldsbrough of The Times and Jake Arnott of The Guardian.

Barbara VanDenburgh of USA Today listed it in "5 new must-read books this week". The book was selected as Good Morning America Book Club pick for January.
