= Ben Coes =

American author (born 1966)

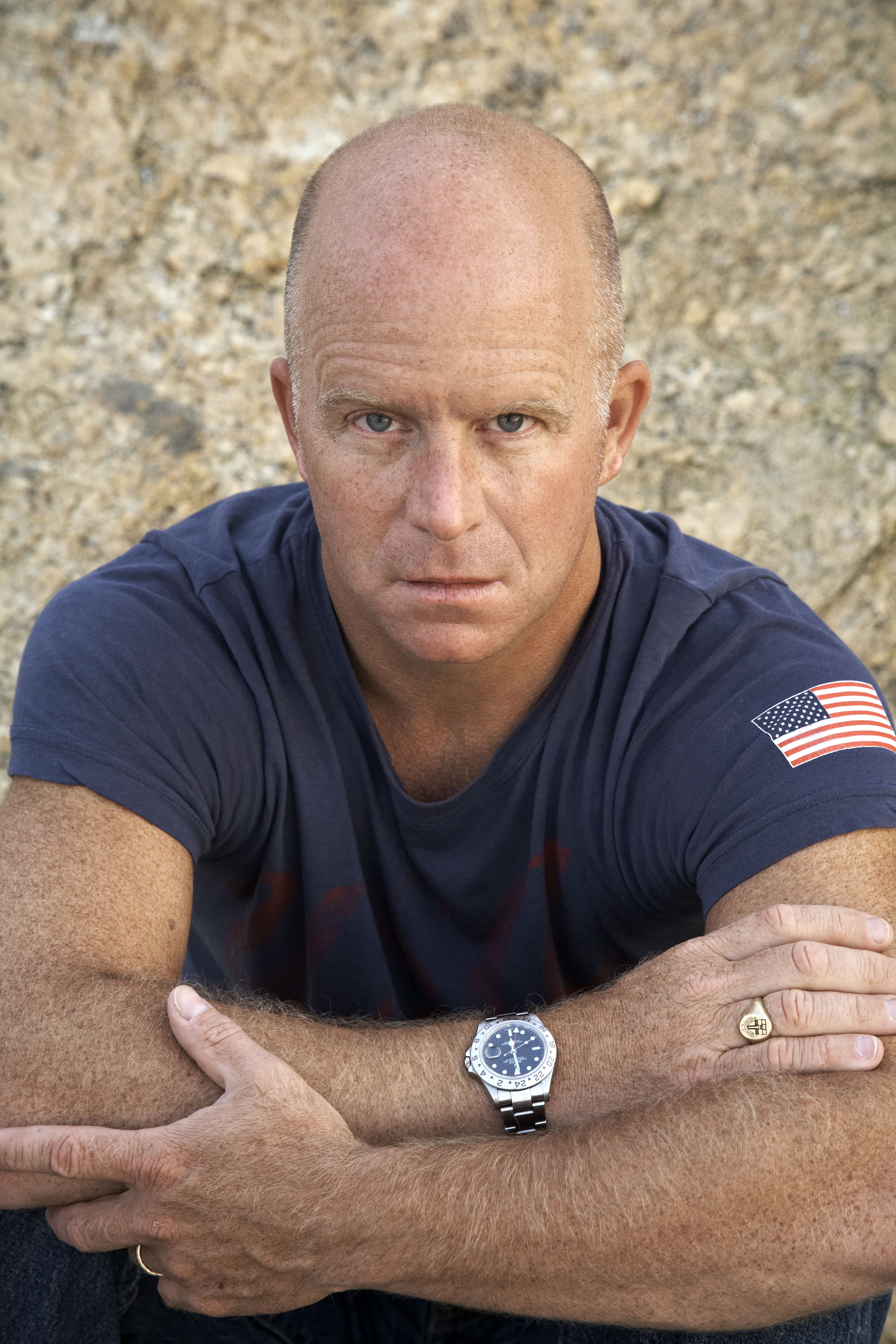
- Born: September 10, 1966 (age 60); Hartford, Connecticut, U.S.
- Education: Columbia College, Columbia University
- Occupation: Novelist
- Writing career
- Language: English
- Genres: Thriller, espionage, military, adventure, political
- Notable works: Power Down; Coup d'État; The Last Refuge; Eye For An Eye; Independence Day; First Strike; Trap the Devil; Bloody Sunday; The Russian; The Island
- Notable awards: Bennett Cerf Memorial Prize, 1989 Columbia University
- Website: bencoes.com

Signature
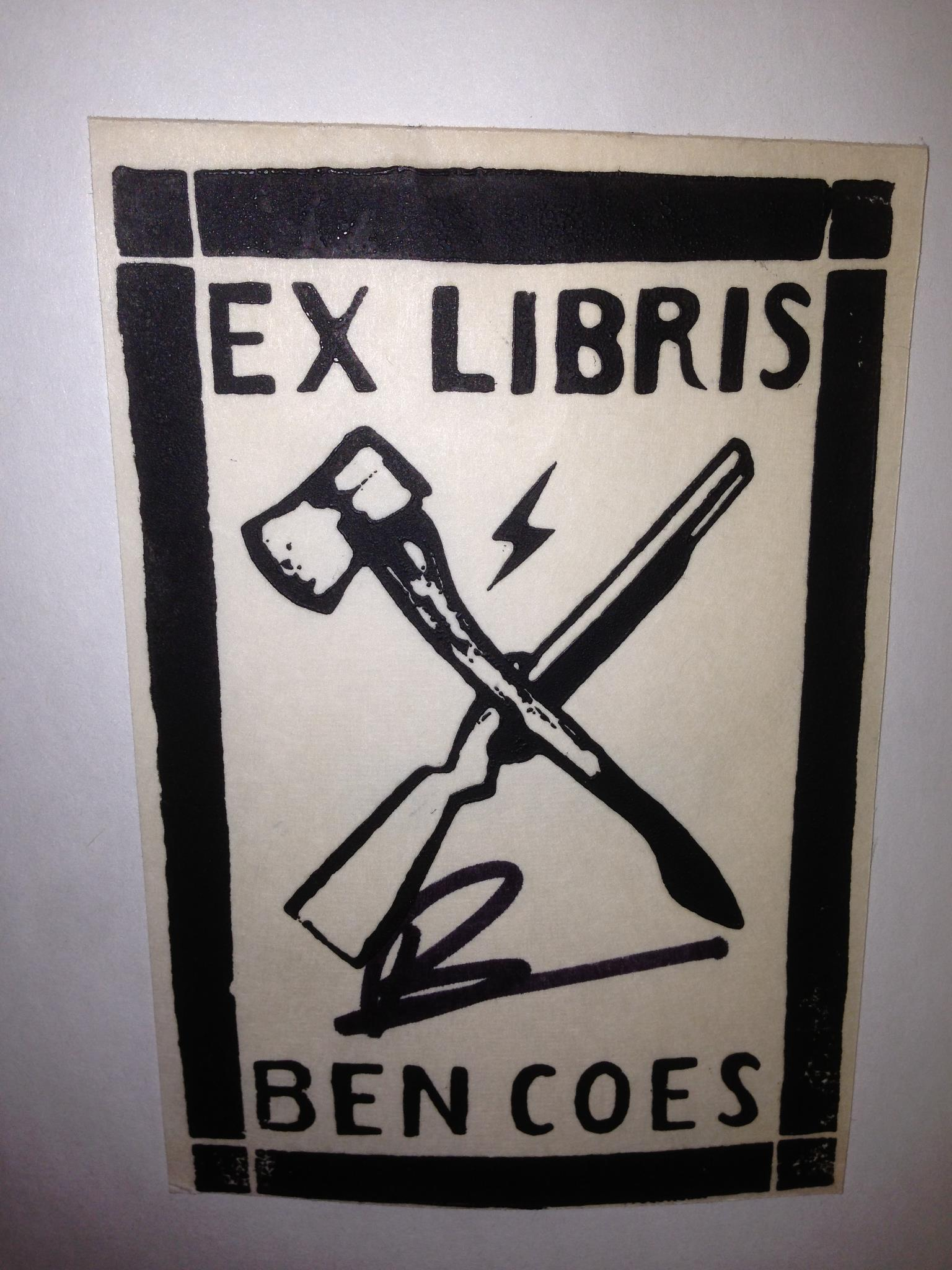

Ben Coes (born September 10, 1966) is a New York Times best-selling author of international political thriller and espionage novels.

Coes's novels feature Dewey Andreas, a former member of U.S. Special Forces 1st SFOD-D, also known as Delta Force. Coes has called his books "reality-based," drawing upon his early career at the White House and in finance. Coes has credited his godfather, a former member of the U.S. Navy SEALs, with influencing the often violent, brutally realistic plots of his novels.

== Early life ==
Ben Coes was born in Hartford, Connecticut and raised in West Simsbury, Connecticut. He attended the Groton School, a boarding school in Massachusetts which counts Franklin D. Roosevelt among its alumni Coes attended Columbia College in New York City, where he was awarded the university's writing prize, the Bennett Cerf Memorial Award.

== Political and business career ==
Coes started his career as a White House intern under President Ronald Reagan, and then served as the White House-appointed speechwriter for former U.S. Secretary of Energy James D. Watkins under President George H. W. Bush. He also wrote speeches for T. Boone Pickens and was campaign manager for Mitt Romney’s 2002 run for governor of Massachusetts. He is a managing partner at The Mustang Group, a private equity firm, which has invested in a number of companies, including Cascade Lacrosse, Vermont Teddy Bear, Scribe Software, Ask Suzy, Country Club Enterprises, Renovation Brands, and SOG Specialty Knives, and is a former fellow of the Harvard University Institute of Politics.

== Books ==
Power Down, Ben Coes's debut novel, stars Dewey Andreas, who faces terrorists trying to destroy America by attacking its energy resources. His second book, Coup d'État, is a sequel to Power Down. Pakistan drops a nuclear bomb on India, and Dewey must stop the situation from escalating. Coes's third novel, The Last Refuge, features a joint covert U.S.-Israel paramilitary operation to penetrate Iran and stop the country from detonating a nuclear device inside Tel Aviv. The fourth installment in the series, Eye For An Eye, involves a clandestine confrontation between China and the U.S., in which Dewey infiltrates the PRC to take revenge for the death of his fiancée. In Coes's fifth book, Independence Day, Dewey must stop a Russian computer hacker and terrorist from detonating a stolen Soviet-era nuclear bomb in New York City on the 4th of July. "First Strike", the sixth book in the Dewey Andreas series, involves America's role in the creation of ISIS through an illegal covert arms-for-influence program. When ISIS takes over a dormitory at Columbia University, (Coes' alma mater) Dewey and a small team of operatives must wage an underground assault on the dormitory in order to save the lives of hundreds.

== Charitable work ==
In 2013, Ben and his family started Thrillers for America's Best, a non-profit that sends books to U.S. Veterans at VA homes and hospitals in the U.S. Its first shipment of books was made in August 2013.

== Bibliography ==
=== Dewey Andreas series ===
#	Title	Publication Date	Publisher
1	Power Down	September 28, 2010	St. Martin's Press
2	Coup d’Etat	September 27, 2011	St. Martin's Press
3	The Last Refuge	July 3, 2012	St. Martin's Press
4	Eye For An Eye	July 9, 2013	St. Martin's Press
5	Independence Day	May 26, 2015	St. Martin's Press
6	First Strike	June 28, 2016	St. Martin's Press
7	Trap the Devil	June 20, 2017	St. Martin's Press
8	Bloody Sunday	July 31, 2018	St. Martin's Press
9	The Island	August 17, 2021	St. Martin's Press

- "Salina" (short story), February 1, 2016.
- "Shooting Gallery" (short story), June 5, 2018.

=== Rob Tacoma series ===
#	Title	Publication Date	Publisher
1	The Russian	July 30, 2019	St. Martin's Press
