= Girl A (novel) =

2021 novel by Abigail Dean

- Author: Abigail Dean
- Language: English
- Genre: Thriller
- Publisher: HarperCollins
- Publication date: January 2021
- Publication place: United Kingdom
- ISBN: 978-0-00-838905-5

Girl A is a novel by Abigail Dean that was published in January 2021. For the crime thriller, which includes the abuse of children, Dean has said that she wanted to "focus on the effects of trauma and the media glare, rather than the suffering which triggers them."

== Publishing history ==
In 2019 it was reported that Dean received a six-figure sum from UK publisher HarperCollins for Girl A and her next novel. She reportedly received a seven-figure deal from US publisher Viking Press. In May 2020 it was reported that Johan Renck was in negotiations to direct and executive produce a limited series of Girl A, for 3000 Pictures at Sony Pictures. Girl A was published in the UK and Australia in January 2021 and in the USA in February 2021.

== Publication details ==
- Girl A. London: HarperCollins, 2021. ISBN 9780008389055.
- Girl A. New York: Viking, 2021. ISBN 978-0593295847.
