= Abigail Dean =

British writer

- Born: Manchester, England
- Education: Robinson College, Cambridge
- Occupation: Writer
- Notable work: Girl A (2021)

Abigail Dean is an English writer, living in south London. She is the author of the novels Girl A (2021), Day One (2024), and The Death of Us (2025).

== Biography ==
Dean was born in Manchester, England, and grew up in Hayfield, Derbyshire. She graduated from Robinson College, Cambridge, in 2008, with a degree in English literature. After her degree, she took a law conversion course, eventually specialising in information technology law, in which she has had a career. She worked as a lawyer for Google.

In 2019, it was reported that Dean received a six-figure sum from UK publisher HarperCollins for her first novel Girl A, and another, The Conspiracies. She reportedly received a seven-figure deal from US publisher Viking Press. Girl A was published in the UK in January 2021.

Her 2025 novel The Death of Us won the CWA Gold Dagger. It also won the Best International Crime Fiction category at the 2026 Ned Kelly Awards.

== Personal life ==
She works as a full-time writer. She lives in South-East London with her husband, children, and a cat called Woody.

== Publications ==
- Girl A. London: HarperCollins, 2021. ISBN 9780008389055.
- Day One. Hemlock, 2024. ISBN 978-0008389260.
- The Death of Us. HarperCollins, 2025. ISBN 9780008625610.
