= Stephen White (author) =

American writer (born 1951)

- Born: 1951 (age 74–75); Long Island, U.S.
- Education: Ph.D. (University of Colorado) 1979
- Occupation: Clinical Psychologist
- Writing career
- Notable work: Alan Gregory in New York Times
- Website: www.authorstephenwhite.com

Stephen Walsh White (born 1951) is an author of psychological thriller fiction best known for his Dr. Alan Gregory series.

== Bibliography ==
=== Alan Gregory Series ===
- Privileged Information (1991), ISBN 978-0-670-83765-6, Book 1
- Private Practices (1992), ISBN 978-0-670-84673-3, Book 2
- Higher Authority (1994), ISBN 978-0-7394-0230-6, Book 3
- Harm's Way (1996), ISBN 978-0-670-85861-3, Book 4
- Remote Control (1997), ISBN 978-0-525-94269-6, Book 5
- Critical Conditions (1998), ISBN 978-0-525-94270-2, Book 6
- Manner Of Death (1999), ISBN 978-0-525-94440-9, Book 7
- Cold Case (2000), ISBN 978-0-525-94526-0, Book 8
- The Program (2001), ISBN 978-0-385-49903-3, Book 9
- Warning Signs (2002), ISBN 978-0-385-33618-5, Book 10
- The Best Revenge (2003), ISBN 978-0-385-33619-2, Book 11
- Blinded (2004), ISBN 978-0-385-33620-8, Book 12
- Missing Persons (2005), ISBN 978-0-7394-5134-2, Book 13
- Kill Me (2006), ISBN 978-0-7394-6544-8, Book 14
- Dry Ice (2007), ISBN 978-0-525-94997-8, Book 15
- Dead Time (2008), ISBN 978-0-525-96006-5, Book 16
- The Siege (2009), ISBN 978-0451228482, Book 17
- The Last Lie (2010), ISBN 978-0451234285, Book 18
- Line of Fire (2012), ISBN 978-0451418364, Book 19 - Part 1 of 2
- Compound Fractures (2013), ISBN 978-0525952602, Book 20 - Part 2 of 2, and Alan Gregory series conclusion
