= Bouchercon XXIX =

1998 mystery and detective fiction convention

- Date: October 1, 1998
- Location: Philadelphia, Pennsylvania
- Country: USA
- Hosted by: Deen Kogan

Bouchercon is an annual convention of creators and devotees of mystery and detective fiction. It is named in honour of writer, reviewer, and editor Anthony Boucher; also the inspiration for the Anthony Awards, which have been issued at the convention since 1986. This page details Bouchercon XXIX and the 13th Anthony Awards ceremony.

== Bouchercon ==
The convention was held in Philadelphia, Pennsylvania on October 1, 1998; running until the 4th. The event was chaired by Deen Kogan, founder of the Society Hill playhouse.

=== Special Guests ===
- American Guest of Honor — Carl Hiaasen
- International Guest of Honor — Janwillem van de Wetering
- Media Guest of Honor — Tom Fontana
- Fan Guest of Honor — Hal Rice and Sonya Rice
- Distinguished Contribution — Ruth Cavin
- Toastmaster — Jonathan Gash

== Anthony Awards ==
The following list details the awards distributed at the thirteenth annual Anthony Awards ceremony.

=== Novel award ===
Winner:

- S. J. Rozan, No Colder Place

Shortlist:

- Anthony Bruno, Devil's Food
- Earl Emerson, Deception Pass
- Arturo Pérez-Reverte, The Club Dumas
- James Sallis, Eye of the Cricket

=== First novel award ===
Winner:

- Lee Child, Killing Floor

Shortlist:

- Grace Edward, If I Should Die
- Maureen Jennings, Except the Dying
- Philip Reed, Bird Dog
- Robert Skinner, Skin Deep, Blood Red

=== Paperback original award ===
Winner:

- Rick Riordan, Big Red Tequila

Shortlist:

- Laura Lippman, Charm City
- Sujata Massey, The Salaryman's Wife
- Martin J. Smith, Time Release
- K.J.A. Wishnia, 23 Shades of Black

=== Short story award ===
Winners:

- Jan Grape, "A Front Row Seat", from Vengeance is Hers
- Edward D. Hoch, "One Bag of Coconuts", from Ellery Queen's Mystery Magazine November 1997

Shortlist:

- Simon Brett, "Ways to Kill a Cat", from Malice Domestic 6
- James DeFilippi, "A Fog of Many Colors", from New Mystery summer 1997
- James S. Dorr, "Paper Boxes", from New Mystery summer 1997

=== Cover art award ===
Winner:

- Michael Kellner; for Kent Anderson, Night Dogs

Shortlist:

- Krystyna Skalski; for G. M. Ford, The Bum's Rush
- Doug Fraser; for K. C. Constantine, Family Values
- Gail Cross; for Jane Rubino, Fruitcake
- Victor Weaver; for Laurence Shames, Virgin Heat
