= Bill Pronzini bibliography =

List of the published work of Bill Pronzini, American writer.

== Novels ==
- The Stalker (1971)
- Panic (1972)
- The Jade Figurine (1972)
- Snowbound (1974)
- Dead Run (1975)
- Freebooty (1976)
- Games (1976)
- The Running of Beasts (1976) (with Barry N. Malzberg)
- Acts of Mercy (1977) (with Barry N. Malzberg)
- Wildfire (1978)
- Night Screams (1979) (with Barry N. Malzberg)
- A Killing in Xanadu (1980)
- Prose Bowl (1980) (with Barry N. Malzberg)
- The Cambodia File (1981) (with Jack Anderson)
- Masques (1981)
- Duel at Gold Buttes (1981) (with Jeffrey M. Wallmann)
- Border Fever (1983) (with Jeffrey M. Wallmann)
- Day of the Moon (1983) (with Jeffrey M. Wallmann)
- The Gallows Land (1983)
- The Eye (1984) (with John Lutz)
- Starvation Camp (1984)
- The Lighthouse (1986) (with Marcia Muller)
- The Last Days of Horse-Shy Halloran (1987)
- Firewind (1989)
- The Hangings (1989)
- With an Extreme Burning (aka The Tormentor) (1994)
- Blue Lonesome (1995)
- A Wasteland of Strangers (1997)
- Nothing But the Night (1999)
- In an Evil Time (2001)
- Step to the Graveyard Easy (2002)
- The Alias Man (2004)
- The Crimes of Jordan Wise (2006)
- The Other Side of Silence (2008)
- The Hidden (2010)
- The Violated (2017)
- Give-A-Damn Jones (2018)
- The Peaceful Valley Crime Wave (2019)

Carpenter and Quincannon Mysteries

1. Quincannon (1985)
2. Beyond the Grave (1986) (with Marcia Muller)
3. Carpenter and Quincannon, Professional Detective Services (1998, short stories)
4. Quincannon's Game (2005)
5. The Bughouse Affair (2013) (with Marcia Muller)
6. The Spook Lights Affair (2013) (with Marcia Muller)
7. The Body Snatchers Affair (2015) (with Marcia Muller)
8. The Plague of Thieves Affair (2016) (with Marcia Muller)
9. The Dangerous Ladies Affair (2017) (with Marcia Muller)
10. The Bags of Tricks Affair (2018)
11. The Flimflam Affair (2019)
12. The Stolen Gold Affair (2020)
13. The Paradise Affair (2021)

Nameless Detective

1. The Snatch, Random House, (1971)
2. The Vanished, Random House, (1973)
3. Undercurrent, Random House, (1973)
4. Blowback, Random House, (1977)
5. Twospot, Putnam, (1978), (with Collin Wilcox)
6. Labyrinth, St. Martin's, (1980)
7. Hoodwink, St. Martin's, (1981)
8. Scattershot, St. Martin's, (1982)
9. Dragonfire, St. Martin's, (1982)
10. Bindlestiff, St. Martin's, (1983)
11. Case File (short stories), St. Martin's, (1983)
12. Quicksilver, St. Martin's, (1984)
13. Nightshades, St. Martin's, (1984)
14. Double, St. Martin's, (1984), (with Marcia Muller)
15. Bones, St. Martin's, (1985)
16. Deadfall, St. Martin's, (1986)
17. Shackles, St. Martin's, (1988)
18. Jackpot, Delacorte, (1990)
19. Breakdown, Delacorte, (1991)
20. Quarry, Delacorte, (1992)
21. Epitaphs, Delacorte, (1992)
22. Demons, Delacorte, (1993)
23. Hardcase, Delacorte, (1995)
24. Spadework (short stories), Crippen & Landru, (1996)
25. Sentinels, Carroll & Graf, (1996)
26. Illusions, Carroll & Graf, (1997)
27. Boobytrap, Carroll & Graf, (1998)
28. Crazybone, Carroll & Graf, (2000)
29. Bleeders, Carroll & Graf, (2002)
30. Spook, Carroll & Graf, (2003)
31. Scenarios (short stories), Forge Books, (2005)
32. Nightcrawlers, Forge Books, (2005)
33. Mourners, Forge Books, (2006)
34. Savages, Forge Books, (2007)
35. Fever, Forge Books, (2008)
36. Schemers, Forge Books, (2009)
37. Betrayers, Forge Books, (2010)
38. Camouflage, Forge Books, (2011)
39. Hellbox, Forge Books, (2012)
40. Kinsmen, (novella), Cemetery Dance Publications, (2012)
41. Femme, (novella), Cemetery Dance Publications, (2012)
42. Nemesis, Forge Books, (2013)
43. Strangers, Forge Books, (2014)
44. Vixen, Forge Books, (2015)
45. Zigzag (collection) Forge Books, (2016)
46. Endgame, Forge Books, (2017)

== Short story collections ==
- Graveyard Plots (1985)
- Small Felonies (1988)
- The Best Western Stories of Bill Pronzini (1991)
- Stacked Deck (1991)
- Criminal Intent 1 (1993)
- Carmody's Run (A Short Novel Plus Three) (1993)
- Duo (with Marcia Muller) (1998)
- Carpenter and Quincannon: Professional Detective Services (1998)
- Sleuths (1999)
- Oddments (2000)
- More Oddments (2001)
- All the Long Years (Western Stories) (2001)
- Problems Solved (with Barry N Malzberg) (2003)
- Burgade's Crossing (2003)
- On Account of Darkness and Other SF Stories (with Barry N Malzberg) (2004)
- Coyote and Quarter-Moon (2006)
- Crucifixion River (Western Stories) (with Marcia Muller) (2007)
- Dago Red (2010)
- The Cemetery Man (2014)
- Zigzag (2016)
- A Little Red Book of Murder Stories (2016)
- Small Felonies 2 (2022)
- High Concepts (Science Fiction & Fantasy Stories) (2023)
- Cream of the Crop: Best Mystery & Suspense Stories of Bill Pronzini (2024)
- The Hanging Man and Other Western Stories (2024)

== As William Hart Davis ==
- Charlie Chan in The Pawns of Death (with Jeffrey Wallmann) (2002)

== As Jack Foxx ==
- The Jade Figurine (1972)
- Incident in Three Crossings (Short Story) (1974)
- Dead Run (1975)
- Freebooty (1976)
- Wildfire (1978)

== As William Jeffrey ==
- Duel at Gold Buttes (1981) (with Jeffrey Wallmann)
- Border Fever (1983) (with Jeffrey Wallmann)
- Day of the Moon (1983) (with Jeffrey Wallmann)

== As Alex Saxon ==
- A Run in Diamonds (1973)
- The Dying Time (1999)

== Non-fiction ==
- Gun in Cheek: An Affectionate Guide to the Worst in Mystery Fiction (1982)
- 1001 Midnights (1986) (with Marcia Muller)
- Son of Gun in Cheek: An Affectionate Guide to More of the "Worst" in Mystery Fiction (1987)
- Six Gun in Cheek: An Affectionate Guide to the "Worst" in Western Fiction (1997)

== Anthologies ==
- Tricks and Treats (1976) (with Joe Gores)
- Midnight Specials (1977)
- Mystery Writers' Choice (1977) (with Joe Gores)
- Dark Sins, Dark Dreams: Crime in Science Fiction (1978) (with Barry N Malzberg)
- The End of Summer: Science Fiction of the Fifties (1979) (with Barry N Malzberg)
- Shared Tomorrows (1979) (with Barry N Malzberg)
- Night Screams (1979) (with Barry N Malzberg)
- Werewolf! (1979)
- Bug-Eyed Monsters (1980) (with Barry N Malzberg)
- The Edgar Winners (1980)
- Voodoo! (1980)
- Mummy! A Chrestomathy of Cryptology (1980)
- The Arbor House Treasury of Horror and the Supernatural (1981) (with Martin H Greenberg & Barry N Malzberg)
- Creature!: A Chrestomathy of Monstery (1981)
- Great Tales of Mystery and Suspense (1981) (with Martin H Greenberg & Barry N Malzberg)
- The Arbor House Necropolis (1981)
- The Giant Book of Horror Stories (1981) (with Martin H Greenberg & Barry N Malzberg)
- The Arbor House Treasury of Mystery and Suspense (1982) (with Martin H Greenberg)
- Specter! (1982)
- Arbor House Treasury of Detective and Mystery Stories from the Great Pulps (1983)
- The Web She Weaves (1983) (with Marcia Muller)
- The Mystery Hall of Fame: An Anthology of Classic Mystery and Suspense Stories Selected by Mystery Writers of America (1984)
- The Western Hall of Fame: An Anthology of Classic Western Stories Selected by the Western Writers of America (1984) (with Martin H Greenberg)
- Child's Ploy (1984) (with Marcia Muller)
- The Outlaws (1984)
- The Reel West (1984) (with Martin H Greenberg)
- Witches' Brew: Horror and Supernatural Stories by Women (1984) (with Marcia Muller)
- 13 Short Mystery Novels (1985) (with Martin H Greenberg)
- Chapter and Hearse (1985) (with Marcia Muller)
- The Cowboys (1985) (with Martin H Greenberg)
- The Ethnic Detectives: Masterpieces of Mystery Fiction (1985) (with Martin H Greenberg)
- The Arbor House Treasury of Great Western Stories (1985)
- Dark Lessons: Crime And Detection On Campus (1985) (with Marcia Muller)
- She Won the West (1985) (with Marcia Muller)
- The Warriors (1985) (with Martin H Greenberg)
- Deadly Arts (1985) (with Marcia Muller)
- The Second Reel West (1985) (with Martin H Greenberg)
- Murder in the First Reel (1985) (Martin H Greenberg & Charles G Waugh)
- Wickedest Show on Earth (1985) (with Marcia Muller)
- Women Sleuths (1985) (with Martin H Greenberg)
- Mystery in the Mainstream: An Anthology of Literary Crimes (1986) (with Martin H Greenberg & Barry N Malzberg)
- Tales of the Dead (1986)
- Great Modern Police Stories (1986)
- Railroaders (1986) (with Martin H Greenberg)
- Steamboaters (1986) (with Martin H Greenberg)
- The Third Reel West (1986) (with Martin H Greenberg)
- The Cattlemen (1986) (with Martin H Greenberg)
- Tales of Mystery (1986)
- 101 Mystery Stories (1986)
- Wild Westerns (1986)
- Prime Suspects (1987) (with Martin H Greenberg)
- Manhattan Mysteries (1987) (with Martin H Greenberg & Carol-Lynn Waugh)
- Horse Soldiers (1987) (with Martin H Greenberg)
- Uncollected Crimes (1987) (with Martin H Greenberg)
- Suspicious Characters (1987) (with Martin H Greenberg)
- The Gunfighters (1987) (with Martin H Greenberg)
- 13 Short Detective Novels (1987) (with Martin H Greenberg)
- Criminal Elements (1988) (with Martin H Greenberg)
- Cloak and Dagger: A Treasury of 35 Great Espionage Stories (1988) (with Martin H Greenberg)
- The Texans (1988) (with Martin H Greenberg)
- Best of the West: Stories That Inspired Classic Western Films (1988) (with Martin H Greenberg)
- Homicidal Acts (1988) (with Martin H Greenberg)
- Felonious Assaults (1989) (with Martin H Greenberg)
- Kill or Cure: Suspense Stories About the World of Medicine (1989) (with Marcia Muller)
- More Wild Westerns (1989)
- Californians (1989) (with Martin H Greenberg)
- The Arizonans (1989)
- Deadly Doings (1989)
- Best of the West 3: More Stories That Inspired Classic Western Films (1990)
- The Northerners (1990) (with Martin H Greenberg)
- The Best of the West II: The Stories That Inspired Classic Western Films (1990)
- The Northwesterners (1990) (with Martin H Greenberg)
- Christmas Out West (1990) (with Martin H Greenberg)
- Crime and Crime Again: Unexpected Mystery Stories by the World's Great Writers (1990) (with Martin H Greenberg & Barry N Malzberg)
- Classic Tales of Horror and the Supernatural (1991)
- A Treasury of Civil War Stories (1991) (with Martin H Greenberg)
- A Treasury of World War II Stories (1991)
- Combat!: Great Tales of World War II (1992) (with Martin H Greenberg)
- Night Freight (1992)
- Great Tales of Horror and the Supernatural (1994) (with Martin H Greenberg & Barry N Malzberg)
- Great Tales of the West (1994) (with Martin H Greenberg)
- Hard-boiled (1994) (with Jack Adrian)
- A Century of Mystery: 1980-1989 (1997) (with Marcia Muller)
- Giant Book of Private Eye Stories (1997) (with Martin H Greenberg)
- Giant Book of Short Crime Stories (1997) (with Martin H Greenberg)
- Giant Book of War Stories (1997) (with Martin H Greenberg)
- Detective Duos (1997) (with Marcia Muller)
- Duo (1998) (with Marcia Muller)
- Heading West (1999)
- Pure Pulp (1999) (with Ed Gorman)

== Short fiction ==
Title	Year	First published	Reprinted/collected	Notes
High concept (with Barry Malzberg)	2013	Analog 133/03 (Mar 2013)		
Transfer point	2015	Malzberg, Barry N. & Bill Pronzini (April 2015). "Transfer point". Analog Science Fiction and Fact. 135 (4): 49–53.		
