= Shamus Award =

Annual award for the best detective fiction novels of the year

The Shamus Award is awarded by the Private Eye Writers of America (PWA) for the best detective fiction (private investigator – P. I.) genre novels and short stories of the year.

The prize is given annually to recognize outstanding achievement in private eye fiction. The Shamus Awards are sometimes (2003, 2007–2009, 2011–2016) announced during the Bouchercon World Mystery Convention, at the convention's PWA Awards Banquet.

== Categories ==
Shamus Award categories
Title	First awarded
Best P. I. Hardcover Novel	1982
Best P. I. Paperback Original	1982
THE EYE – Lifetime Achievement Award	1982
Best P. I. Short Story	1983
Best First P. I. Novel	1985
St. Martins' Press/ PWA Best First Private Eye Novel Contest	1986
Friends of PWA	2002
Best P. I. Series/Characters – The Hammer	2007
Best Indie P.I. Novel	2013

== Winners ==
=== Best P. I. Hardcover Novel ===
Best P. I. Hardcover Novel winners
Year	Winner	Title
1982	Bill Pronzini	Hoodwink; St. Martin’s Press, New York 1981
1983	Lawrence Block	Eight Million Ways to Die; Arbor House, New York 1982
1984	Max Allan Collins	True Detective; St. Martin’s Press, New York 1983
1985	Loren D. Estleman	Sugartown; Houghton Mifflin, Boston1984
1986	Sue Grafton	"B" Is for Burglar; Holt, Rinehart & Winston, New York 1986
1987	Jeremiah Healy	The Staked Goat; Harper & Row, New York 1986
1988	Benjamin Schutz	A Tax in Blood; Tom Doherty, New York 1987
1989	John Lutz	Kiss; Henry Holt, New York 1988
1990	Jonathan Valin	Extenuating Circumstances; Delacorte Press, New York 1989
1991	Sue Grafton	"G" Is for Gumshoe; Henry Holt, New York 1990
1992	Max Allan Collins	Stolen Away; Bantam Books, New York 1991
1993	Harold Adams	The Man Who was Taller Than God; Walker & Co., New York 1992
1994	Lawrence Block	The Devil Knows You're Dead; William Morrow, New York 1993
1995	Sue Grafton	"K" Is for Killer; Henry Holt, New York 1994
1996	S. J. Rozan	Concourse; St. Martin’s Press, New York 1995
1997	Robert Crais	Sunset Express; Hyperion, New York 1996
1998	Terence Faherty	Come Back Dead; Simon & Schuster, New York 1997
1999	Bill Pronzini	Boobytrap; Carroll & Graf, New York 1998
2000	Don Winslow	California Fire and Life; Alfred A. Knopf, New York 1999
2001	Carolina Garcia-Aguilera	Havana Heat; William Morrow, New York 2000
2002	S. J. Rozan	Reflecting the Sky; St. Martin’s Minotaur, New York 2001
2003	James W. Hall	Blackwater Sound; St. Martin’s Press, New York 2002
2004	Ken Bruen	The Guards; Brandon, Dingle Co. Kerry /Ireland 2001
2005	Ed Wright	While I Disappear; Putnam’s, New York 2004
2006	Michael Connelly	The Lincoln Lawyer; Little, Brown, Boston 2005
2007	Ken Bruen	The Dramatist; Brandon, Dingle Co. Kerry/Ireland 2004
2008	Reed Farrel Coleman	Soul Patch; Bleak House Books, Madison/WI 2007
2009	Reed Farrel Coleman	Empty Ever After; Bleak House Books, Madison/WI 2008
2010	Marcia Muller	Locked In
2011	Lori Armstrong	No Mercy
2012	Michael Wiley	A Bad Night's Sleep
2013	Robert Crais	Taken
2014	Brad Parks	The Good Cop
2015	David Rosenfelt	Hounded; St. Martin’s Minotaur, New York 2014
2016	Ingrid Thoft	Brutality
2017	Reed Farrel Coleman	Where It Hurts; G.P. Putnam's Sons, 2016
2018	T. Jefferson Parker	The Room of White Fire; G.P. Putnam's Sons, 2016
2019	Kristen Lepionka	What You Want to See; Minotaur Books, 2018
2020	Matt Coyle	Lost Tomorrows; Oceanview Publishing, 2019
2021	Matt Coyle	Blind Vigil; Oceanview Publishing, 2019
2022	S. J. Rozan	Family Business; Pegasus Crime, 2021
2023	Jonathan Ames	The Wheel of Doll; Mulholland Books, 2022
2024	Will Thomas	Heart of the Nile
2025	Delia Pitts	Trouble in Queenstown

=== Best First P. I. Novel ===
Best First P. I. Novel winners
Year	Winner	Title
1985	Jack Early	A Creative Kind of Killer; Watts Publishing, New York 1984
1986	Wayne Warga	Hardcover; Arbor House, New York 1985
1987	J. W. Rider	Jersey Tomatoes; Arbor House, New York 1986
1988	Michael Allegretto	Death on the Rocks; Scribner’s, New York 1987
1989	Gar Anthony Haywood	Fear of the Dark; St. Martin’s Press, New York 1988
1990	Karen Kijewski	Katwalk; St. Martin’s Press, New York 1989
1991	Walter Mosley	Devil in a Blue Dress; W.W. Norton, New York 1990
1992	Thomas Davis	Suffer Little Children; Walker & Co., New York 1991
1993	John Straley	The Woman Who Married a Bear; Soho Press, New York 1992
1994	Lynn Hightower	Satan's Lambs; Walker & Co., New York 1993
1995	Dennis Lehane	A Drink Before the War; Harcourt Brace, New York 1994
1996	Richard Barre	The Innocents; Walker & Co., New York 1995
1997	Carol Lea Benjamin	This Dog for Hire; Walker & Co., New York 1996
1998	Rick Riordan	Big Red Tequila; Bantam Books, New York 1997
1999	Steve Hamilton	A Cold Day in Paradise; St. Martin’s Press, New York 1998
2000	John Connolly	Every Dead Thing; Hodder & Stoughton, London, 1999
2001	Bob Truluck	Street Level; Thomas Dunne Books, New York 2000
2002	David Fulmer	Chasing the Devil's Tail; Poisoned Pen Press, Scottsdale/Arizona 2001
2003	Eddie Muller	The Distance; Scribner’s, New York 2002
2004	Peter Spiegelman	Black Maps; Alfred A. Knopf, New York 2003
2005	Ingrid Black	The Dead; Headline, London 2003
2006	Louise Ure	Forcing Amaryllis; Mysterious Press, New York 2005
2007	Declan Hughes	The Wrong Kind of Blood; William Morrow, New York 2006
2008	Sean Chercover	Big City, Bad Blood; William Morow, New York 2007
2009	Ian Vasquez	In the Heat; St. Martin's Minotaur, New York 2008
2010	Brad Parks	Faces of the Gone
2011	Michael Ayoob	In Search of Mercy; St. Martin's Minotaur, New York 2010
2012	P.G. Sturges	The Shortcut Man; Scribner’s, New York 2011
2013	Michael Sears	Black Fridays; Putnam, New York 2012
2014	Lachlan Smith	Bear Is Broken; Mysterious Press, New York 2013
2015	Julia Dahl	Invisible City; St. Martin's Minotaur, New York 2014
2016	Lisa Sandlin	The Do-Right; Cinco Puntos Press, El Paso 2015
2017	Joe Ide	IQ; Mulholland Books, 2017
2018	Kristen Lepionka	The Last Place You Look; Minotaur Books, 2017
2019	Katrina Carrasco	The Best Bad Things MCD Farrar, Straus, Giroux, 2018
2021	Kwei Quartey	The Missing American Soho Crime, 2020
2022	Gregory Stout	Lost Little Girl
2023	Philip Miller	The Goldenacre
2025	Ash Clifton	Twice the Trouble

=== Best P. I. Paperback Original ===
Best P. I. Paperback Original winners
Year	Winner	Title
1982	Max Byrd	California Thriller; Bantam Books, New York 1981
1983	William Campbell Gault	The Cana Diversion; Worldwide, New York/ Toronto 1982
1984	Paul Engleman	Dead in Centerfield; Ballantine Books, New York 1983
1985	Warren Murphy	Ceiling of Hell; Fawcett Crest, New York 1984
1986	Earl Emerson	Poverty Bay; Avon Books, New York 1985
1987	Rob Kantner	The Back Door Man; Bantam Books, New York 1986
1988	L.J. Washburn	Wild Night; Tom Doherty, New York 1987
1989	Rob Kantner	Dirty Work; Bantam Books, New York 1988
1990	Rob Kantner	Hell's Only Half Full; Bantam Books, New York 1989
1991	W. Glenn Duncan	Rafferty: Fatal Sisters; Fawcett Books, Greenwich/CT. 1990
1992	Paul Kemprecos	Cool Blue Tomb; Bantam Books, New York 1991
1993	Marele Day	The Last Tango of Dolores Delgado; Allen & Unwin, St. Leonards/Australia 1992
1994	Rodman Philbrick	Brothers and Sinners; Penguin Books CND, Toronto 1993
1995	Ed Goldberg	Served Cold; West Coast Crime, Portland/Oregon 1994
1996	William Jaspersohn	Native Angels; Bantam Books, New York 1995
1997	Harlan Coben	Fade Away; Dell, New York 1996
1998	Laura Lippman	Charm City; Avon Books, New York 1997
1999	Steven Womack	Murder Manual; Ballantine Books, New York 1998
2000	Laura Lippman	In Big Trouble; Avon Books, New York 1999
2001	Thomas Lipinski	Death in the Steel City; Avon Twilight, New York 2000
2002	Lyda Morehouse	Archangel Protocol; New American Library, New York 2001
2003	D. Daniel Judson	The Poisoned Rose; Bantam Books, New York 2002
2004	Andy Straka	Cold Quarry; Signet, New York 2003
2005	Max Phillips	Fade to Blonde; Dorchester Publishing, New York 2004
2006	Reed Farrel Coleman	The James Deans; Plume, New York 2005
2007	P. J. Parrish	An Unquiet Grave; Kensington Books, New York 2006
2008	Richard Aleas	Songs of Innocence; Hard Case Crime, New York 2007
2009	Lori G. Armstrong	Snow Blind; Medallion Press, St Charles/IL 2008
2010	Ira Berkowitz	Sinner's Ball; Three Rivers Press, New York 2009
2011	Christopher G. Moore	Asia Hand; Grove/Atlantic Inc., New York 2010
2012	Duane Swierczynski	Fun & Games; Mulholland Books, London 2011
2013	Alison Gaylin	And She Was; Harper, New York 2012
2014	P.J. Parrish	Heart of Ice; Pocket Books, New York 2013
2015	Vincent Zandri	Moonlight Weeps; Down & Out Books, Tampa 2014
2016	J. L. Abramo	Circling the Runway; Down & Out Books, Tampa 2015
2017	Vaseem Khan	The Perplexing Theft of the Jewel in the Crown
2018	Rich Zahradnik	Lights Out Summer; Camel Press, 2019
2019	Max Wirestone	The Questionable Behavior of Dahlia Moss Redhook Books, 2018
2020	James D. F. Hannah	Behind the Wall of Sleep James D.F. Hannah, 2019
2021	Richard Helms	Brittle Karma Barbados Hall Communications, 2020
2022	John McFetridge	Every city is Every Other City
2023	J.R. Sanders	Dead-Bang Fall
2024	Gabriel Valjan	Liar’s Dice
2025	J.T. Siemens	Call of the Void

=== THE EYE – Lifetime Achievement Award ===
(Not awarded in 1989, 1990, 1996, 1998, 2001, 2012, 2014, 2019, 2020, 2022-2024)

Lifetime Achievement Award winners
Year	Winner
1982	Ross Macdonald
1983	Mickey Spillane
1984	William Campbell Gault
1985	Howard Browne
1986	Richard S. Prather
1987	Bill Pronzini
1988	Dennis Lynds and Wade Miller
1991	Roy Huggins
1992	Joseph Hansen
1993	Marcia Muller
1994	Stephen J. Cannell
1995	John Lutz and Robert B. Parker
1997	Stephen Marlowe
1999	Maxine O'Callaghan
2000	Edward D. Hoch
2002	Lawrence Block
2003	Sue Grafton
2004	Donald Westlake
2005	Sara Paretsky
2006	Max Allan Collins
2007	Stuart M. Kaminsky
2008	Joe Gores
2009	Robert J. Randisi
2010	Robert Crais
2011	Ed Gorman
2013	Loren D. Estleman
2015	Parnell Hall
2016	S.J. Rozan
2017	Jerry Kennealy
2018	Walter Mosley
2021	Michael Z. Lewin
2025	Christine Matthews

=== Best P. I. Series Character – The Hammer ===
Best P. I. Series Character winners
Year	Series/Characters	Authors
2007	Shell Scott	Richard S. Prather
2008	The Nameless Detective	Bill Pronzini
2009	Matt Scudder	Lawrence Block
2010	Sharon McCone	Marcia Muller
2011	V.I. Warshawski	Sara Paretsky
2012	Nate Heller	Max Allan Collins
2014	Kinsey Millhone	Sue Grafton

=== Best Indie P.I. Novel ===
Best Indie P.I. Novel winners
Year	Winner	Title
2013	Paul D. Marks	White Heat
2014	M. Ruth Myers	Don't Dare a Dame
2015	Trace Conger	The Shadow Broker
