= Bouchercon XXVII =

1996 mystery and detective fiction convention

Bouchercon XXVI
- "Capitol Crimes"
- Date: October 10, 1996
- Location: Saint Paul, Minnesota
- Country: USA
- Hosted by: Dennis Armstrong, Bruce Southworth

Bouchercon is an annual convention of creators and devotees of mystery and detective fiction. It is named in honour of writer, reviewer, and editor Anthony Boucher; also the inspiration for the Anthony Awards, which have been issued at the convention since 1986. This page details Bouchercon XXVII and the 11th Anthony Awards ceremony.

== Bouchercon ==
The convention was held in Saint Paul, Minnesota on October 10, 1996; running until the 13th. The event was chaired by Dennis Armstrong and freelance book reviewer Bruce Southworth. Armstrong was working for the local "Once Upon a Crime" book-store at the time and was allowed to take time off work to organise the event.

=== Special Guests ===
- Guest of Honor — Mary Higgins Clark
- Fan Guest of Honor — Ellen Nehr
- Toastmaster — Jeremiah Healy

== Anthony Awards ==
The following list details the awards distributed at the eleventh annual Anthony Awards ceremony.

=== Novel award ===
Winner:

- Mary Willis Walker, Under the Beetle's Cellar

Shortlist:

- Michael Connelly, The Last Coyote
- Barbara D'Amato, Hard Christmas
- Andrew Klavan, True Crime
- Bill Pronzini, Blue Lonesome

=== First novel award ===
Winner:

- Virginia Lanier, Death in Bloodhound Red

Shortlist:

- Richard Barre, The Innocents
- G. M. Ford, Who in Hell is Wanda Fuca?
- Charles Kenney, Hammurabi's Code
- Martha C. Lawrence, Murder in Scorpio

=== Paperback original award ===
Winners:

- Harlan Coben, Deal Breaker

Shortlist:

- Eileen Dreyer, Bad Medicine
- Teri Holbrook, A Far and Deadly Cry
- Gloria White, Charged with Guilt
- Robert D. Zimmerman, Closet

=== Short story award ===
Winner:

- Gar Anthony Haywood, "And Pray Nobody Sees You", from Spooks, Spies, and Private Eyes

Shortlist:

- K.K. Beck, "Rule of Law", from Malice Domestic 4
- Jean B. Cooper, "The Judge's Boy", from Ellery Queen's Mystery Magazine August 1995
- Bill Crider, "How I Found a Cat, Lost True Love, and Broke the Bank at Monte Carlo", from Cat Crimes Takes a Vacation
- Elizabeth Daniels Squire, "The Dog Who Remembered Too Much", from Malice Domestic 4

=== Critical / Non-fiction award ===
Winner:

- Kate Stine, The Armchair Detective Book of Lists

Shortlist:

- Nicholas A. Basbanes, A Gentle Madness: Bibliophiles, Bibliomanes, and the Eternal Passion for Books
- Douglas G. Greene, John Dickson Carr: The Man Who Explained Miracles
- Robert Polito, Savage Art: A Biography of Jim Thompson
- B.J. Rahn, Ngaio Marsh: The Woman and Her Work

=== True crime award ===
Winner:

- Ann Rule, Dead By Sunset

Shortlist:

- Burl Barer, Man Overboard: The Counterfeit Resurrection of Phil Champagne
- John E. Douglas & Mark Olshaker, Mindhunter: Inside the FBI's Elite Serial Crime Unit
- Pete Earley, Circumstantial Evidence: Death, Life, and Justice in a Southern Town
- T. J. English, Born to Kill

=== Short story collection / anthology award ===
Winner:

- Marcia Muller, The McCone Files: The Complete Sharon McCone Stories

Shortlist:

- Martin H. Greenberg & Edward Gorman, Cat Crimes Takes A Vacation
- Carolyn G. Hart, Crimes Of The Heart
- Carolyn G. Hart, Malice Domestic 4
- Paula L. Woods, Spooks, Spies, and Private Eyes

=== Movie award ===
Winner:

- The Usual Suspects

Shortlist:

- Copycat
- Devil in a Blue Dress
- Get Shorty
- Seven

=== Television series award ===
Winner:

- The X-Files

Shortlist:

- Life on the Street
- Law & Order
- Murder One
- N.Y.P.D. Blue

=== Magazine award ===
Winner:

- The Armchair Detective

Shortlist:

- Deadly Pleasures
- Drood Review
- Ellery Queen's Mystery Magazine
- Mystery Scene

=== Publisher award ===
Winner:

- St. Martin's Press

Shortlist:

- Avon
- Mysterious Press
- Scribner's
- Walker Books

=== Editor award ===
Winner:

- Sara Ann Freed

Shortlist:

- Marjorie Braman
- Carolyn Marino
- Kate Miciak
- Michael Seidman

=== Cover art award ===
Winner:

- Pamela Patrick; for Jeanne Dams, The Body in the Transept

Shortlist:

- Fred George & Corsillo/Manzone; for John Dunning, The Bookman's Wake
- John Howard & Krystyna Skalski; for Bill Moody, Death of a Tenor Man
- FCL Colorspace & Richard Hasselberger; for Lynn Hightower, Flashpoint
- Earl Emerson; for his The Vanishing Smile
