= Sam Cabot =

Sam or Samuel Cabot may refer to:

== Writers (collective nom de plume: Sam Cabot) ==
- Carlos Dews (born 1963)
- S. J. Rozan (born 1950)

== Cabot family ==
- Samuel Cabot III, physician and ornithologist
- Samuel Cabot Incorporated, manufacturer of wood stain and other wood products
- Samuel Cabot Jr. (1784–1863), American businessman
- Samuel Cabot IV, founder of Samuel Cabot Incorporated

== Others ==
- Sam Cabot, fictional character in 4th of July (novel)
