= Collin Wilcox =

Collin Wilcox may refer to:

- Collin Wilcox (writer) (1924–1996), American mystery writer
- Collin Wilcox (actress) (1935–2009), American actress
