= Pineapple Press =

American publisher

- Parent company: Globe Pequot Press
- Founded: 1982
- Founder: June and David Cussen
- Country of origin: United States
- Headquarters location: Sarasota, Florida
- Distribution: National Book Network
- Publication types: Books
- Official website: www.pineapplepress.com

Pineapple Press is a niche publisher in Florida. Its catalogue includes non-fiction titles such as "Baseball in Florida" and "Florida's Birds" (a reference book with artwork by Karl Karalus) as well as compilations such as "Cracker literature", books on historic homes, lighthouses, Gulf Coast islands, and fiction including historical novels from Patrick D. Smith and a mystery by Virginia Lanier ("Death in Bloodhound Red" set in Georgia's Okefenokee Swamp). Pineapple also publishes works by Marjory Stoneman Douglas. The publisher adds approximately 12–14 titles a year. The "hits" sell 3,000 or 4,000 copies annually adding up to total revenue of about $1 million for the publisher annually. It is run by June and David Cussen. Some books have been optioned for movies. Pineapple Press was acquired by Rowman & Littlefield in 2018 and became an imprint of Globe Pequot Press.

== Other titles ==
Florida's First People: 12,000 Years of Human History by Robin C. Brown, a doctor in Fort Myers who also authored Florida's Fossils
