= Glacken =

Glacken (or Glackens) is a surname. Notable people with the surname include:

- Clarence Glacken
- Louis Glackens, American illustrator and cartoonist L. M. Glackens
- Scotty Glacken, American football player and coach
- William Glackens

== See also ==
- Smoke Glacken, a racehorse
