= Reed Farrel Coleman =

American novelist

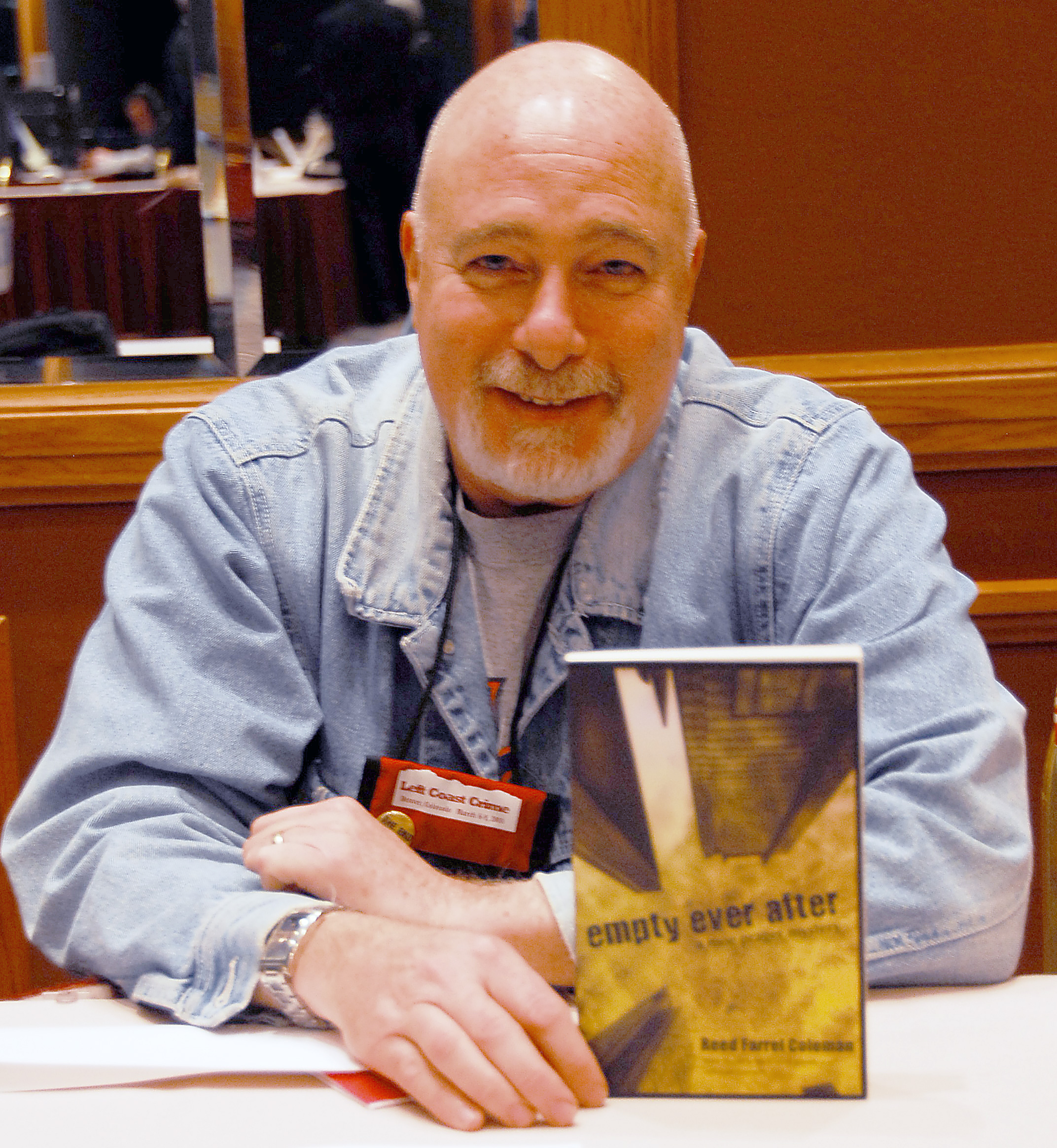
- Coleman at the Left Coast Crime in Denver, Colorado in April 2008
- Born: March 29, 1956 (age 70); New York City, U.S.
- Occupations: Poet, crime fiction writer
- Spouse: Rosanne
- Children: Kaitlin, Dylan
- Writing career
- Pen name: Tony Spinosa
- Years active: 1991 to present
- Genre: Crime fiction
- Notable work: Moe Prager series
- Notable awards: Anthony (2006); Audie (2013); Barry (2006); Macavity (2010); Shamus (2006, 2008, 2009)
- Website: reedcoleman.com

Reed Farrel Coleman (born March 29, 1956) is an American writer of crime fiction and a poet.

== Life and career ==
Reed Farrel Coleman, the youngest of three boys, was born and raised in the Sheepshead Bay, Coney Island, Brighton Beach section of Brooklyn. As a teenager, he heard a shot while walking to work, and saw a man lying in the street with a fatal stomach wound. That is when he realized, "People do get hurt." He started writing in high school. He has worked at an ice cream store, in air freight at Kennedy Airport, as a car leasing agent, in baby food sales, cooking at a restaurant, as a cab driver, and delivering home heating oil. Coleman met his wife Rosanne at The New School in a writing class. They have two children, Kaitlin and Dylan. He now lives on Long Island.

Coleman only considered making writing a career once taking a Brooklyn College detective fiction class. He is a multiple award-winning author, particularly his Moe Prager series. Also published are series featuring protagonists Gulliver Dowd, Dylan Klein, and Joe Serpe. The Dowd character was based on a retired police detective that he had met. The Joe Serpe novels were originally written under the pen name Tony Spinosa, but are now available as Coleman titles. He has written the stand-alone novels Tower with Ken Bruen, Bronx Reqiem with Det. (ret.) John Roe of the NYPD, Gun Church, and several short stories, essays, and poems. Coleman has won Anthony, Audie, Barry, Macavity and Shamus Awards. His books and stories have additionally been nominated for Gumshoe and Edgar Awards. The books have been translated into seven languages.

He considers William Blake, Lawrence Block, T.S. Eliot, Wallace Stevens, William Carlos Williams, Raymond Chandler and Dashiell Hammett to be early influences. Later he found significance in the writing of colleagues Peter Blauner, Ken Bruen, Jim Fusilli, S.J. Rozan, and Peter Spiegelman. He says, though, that his single greatest writing influence was his college poetry professor, David Lehman, who provided "permission to be a writer and...the first clues on self-editing". NPR has referred to him as "a hard-boiled poet", HuffPost says, "Coleman is the resident noir poet laureate of the United States" and The New York Times has commented, "If you dragged one (of his books) across the asphalt, you'd half-expect it to leave a chalk outline".

With a four-book contract, Coleman took over writing Robert B. Parker's Jesse Stone series with the September 2014 publication of Blind Spot. His 2019 Jesse Stone novel The Bitterest Pill would win a Scribe Award for Best Original Novel. He has also been signed to a two-book deal featuring retired Suffolk County (NY) cop turned PI Gus Murphy. He is an adjunct instructor of English at Hofstra University, a former Executive Vice President of Mystery Writers of America, and a founding member of Mystery Writers of America University.

== Published works ==
=== Dylan Klein series ===
- Life Goes Sleeping, Permanent Press, 1991. ISBN 1877946052
- Little Easter, Permanent Press, 1993. ISBN 1877946230
- They Don't Play Stickball in Milwaukee, Permanent Press, 1997. ISBN 1877946958

=== Moe Prager series ===
- Walking the Perfect Square, Permanent Press, 2001. ISBN 1579620396
- Redemption Street, Viking, 2004. ISBN 0670032913
- The James Deans, Plume, 2005. ISBN 0452286506
- Soul Patch, Bleak House Books, 2007. ISBN 978-1932557411
- Empty Ever After, Bleak House Books, 2008. ISBN 978-1932557640
- Innocent Monster, Tyrus Books, 2010. ISBN 978-1935562207
- Hurt Machine, Tyrus Books, 2011. ISBN 978-1440532023
- Onion Street, Tyrus Books, 2013. ISBN 978-1440539459
- The Hollow Girl, F+W Media, Inc., 2014. ISBN 978-1440562020

=== Joe Serpe series ===
(writing as Tony Spinosa)

- Hose Monkey, Bleak House Books, 2006. ISBN 978-1932557183
- The Fourth Victim, Bleak House Books, 2008. ISBN 978-1606480090

=== Gulliver Dowd series ===
- Dirty Work, Raven Books [Orca Book Publishers], 2013. ISBN 978-1459802063
- Valentino Pier, Raven Books [Orca Book Publishers], 2013. ISBN 9781459802094
- The Boardwalk, Raven Books [Orca Book Publishers], 2015. ISBN 978-1459806740
- Love and Fear, Raven Books [Orca Book Publishers], 2016. ISBN 978-1459806771

=== Gus Murphy series ===
- Where It Hurts, 2016. ISBN 978-0399173035
- What You Break, 2016.

=== Nick Ryan series ===
- Sleepless City, Blackstone Publishing, 2023. ISBN 978-1982627478
- Blind to Midnight, Blackstone Publishing, 2024. ISBN 979-8874823900

=== Robert B. Parker's Jesse Stone ===
- Blind Spot, G.P. Putnam, 2014. ISBN 978-0399169458
- The Devil Wins, G.P. Putnam, 2015.
- Debt to Pay, G.P. Putnam, 2016. ISBN 978-0399171437.
- The Hangman’s Sonnet, Penguin Random House, 2017.
- Colorblind, Penguin Random House, 2018.
- The Bitterest Pill, Penguin Random House, 2019.

=== Standalone novels ===
- Tower (with Ken Bruen), Busted Flush Press, 2009. ISBN 978-1935415077
- Bronx Requiem: a detective Jack Kenny mystery (with John Roe), Hyperion, 2012. ISBN 978-1401304645
- Gun Church, Tyrus, 2012. ISBN 978-1440551703

=== Selection of essays and short stories ===
==== Fiction ====
- "Portrait of the Killer As a Young Man"
  Dublin Noir: The Celtic Tiger Vs. the Ugly American, ed. Ken Bruen, Akashic Books, 2006, pp. 61–66. ISBN 978-1-888451-92-4
- "Killing O'Malley" (as Tony Spinosa)
  Hardboiled Brooklyn, ed. Coleman, Bleak House, 2006, pp. 108–115. ISBN 1-932557-17-2
- "Bat-Head Speed"
  These Guns for Hire, ed. by J. A. Konrath, Bleak House, 2006, pp. 299–306. ISBN 1-932557-20-2
- "Another Role"
  Indian Country Noir, eds. Sarah Cortez & Liz Martínez, Akashic Books, 2010, pp. 214–238. ISBN 978-1-936070-05-3
- "Mastermind" (fr. Long Island Noir, ed. K. Jones)
  USA Noir: Best of the Akashic Noir Series, ed. Johnny Temple, Akashic Books, 2013, pp 170–179. ISBN 978-1-61775-184-4
- "The Terminal"
  Kwik Krimes, ed. Otto Penzler, Thomas & Mercer, 2013, pp. 93–96. ISBN 978-1612183008

==== Nonfiction ====
- "Go East, Young Man: Robert B. Parker, Jesse Stone, and Spenser"
  In Pursuit of Spenser: Mystery Writers on Robert B. Parker and the Creation of an American Hero, ed. Otto Penzler, BenBella Books, 2012, pp. 193–210. ISBN 978-1-935618-57-7
- "Tomato Red by Daniel Woodrell (1998)"
  Books to Die For, eds. John Connolly & Declan Burke, Hodder & Stoughton, 2012, pp. 649–654. ISBN 978-1-444-75650-0

=== Poetry ===
- The Lineup: Poems on Crime 2, ed. Gerald So, with Patrick Bagley, Richie Narvaez & Anthony Rainone, Poetic Justice Press, 2009.
- The Lineup: Poems on Crime 3, ed. Gerald So with Sarah Cortez, Richie Narvaez & AnthonyRainone, Poetic Justice Press, 2010.
- The Lineup: Poems on Crime 4, ed. Gerald So with Reed Farrel Coleman, Sarah Cortez, & Richie Narvaez, Poetic Justice Press, 2011.

== Awards ==
=== Anthony Award ===
- 2006 Best Paperback Original - The James Deans - WINNER
- 2010 Best Paperback Original - Tower (w/Ken Bruen) - finalist
- 2012 Best Novel - Hurt Machine - finalist

=== Audie Award ===
- 2013 Original Work - Gun Church - WINNER

=== Barry Award ===
- 2006 Best Paperback Original Mystery/Crime Novel - The James Deans - WINNER
- 2008 Best Mystery/Crime Novel - Soul Patch - finalist
- 2012 Best Mystery/Crime Novel - Hurt Machine - finalist
- 2015 Best Mystery/Crime Novel - The Hollow Girl - finalist
- 2017 Best Mystery/Crime Novel - Where it Hurts - finalist

=== Gumshoe Award ===
- 2006 Best Novel - The James Deans - finalist

=== Edgar Award ===
- 2006 Best Paperback Original - The James Deans - finalist
- 2008 Best Novel - Soul Patch - finalist
- 2014 Best Short Story - "The Terminal" in Kwik Krimes - finalist
- 2017 Best Novel - Where It Hurts - finalist

=== Macavity Award ===
- 2006 Best Mystery Novel - The James Deans - finalist
- 2008 Best Mystery Novel - Soul Patch - finalist
- 2010 Best Mystery Novel - Tower (w/Ken Bruen) - WINNER
- 2014 Best Mystery Short Story - "The Terminal" in Kwik Krimes - finalist

=== Shamus Award ===
- 2006 Best PI Paperback Original - The James Deans - WINNER
- 2008 Best PI Hardcover - Soul Patch - WINNER
- 2009 Best PI Hardcover - Empty Ever After - WINNER
- 2015 Best PI Novel - The Hollow Girl - finalist
- 2017 Best PI Hardcover - Where It Hurts - WINNER
- 2018 Best PI Short Story - "Breakage" - finalist
