= Brad Parks =

Brad Parks may refer to:

- Brad Parks (author)
- Brad Parks (tennis)
