= Karl Karalus =

Illustrator and Wildlife Painter

Karl Karalus (1926-2013) was an illustrator and wildlife painter. He was married to Helen Couch Karalus. His work includes the illustrations for the book Florida Birds.

Karalus was an engineer for the Minneapolis, St. Paul and Sault Ste. Marie Railroad for 23 years. In 1971 he resigned from the railroad and moved with his family to Florida where he pursued painting full-time. He specialized in birds and illustrated eight books. He co-authored another three. His works include The Owls of North America (Doubleday, 1974 ), Florida's Birds (Pineapple Press, 1990 by Dr. Herb Kale and biologist David S. Maehr), The Wading Birds of North America (Doubleday, 1981) and "Parrots of South Florida", authored by Susan Allene Epps (published by Pineapple Press in 2007). He moved with his family moved to North Carolina in 1989 and continued his illustration work. He was a fisherman, outdoorsman, adventurer and butterfly enthusiast.
