= The Shanghai Moon =

2009 mystery novel by S. J. Rozan

- First edition
- Author: S. J. Rozan
- Language: English
- Publication date: 2009

The Shanghai Moon is a Lydia Chin/Bill Smith mystery novel by S. J. Rozan. It was published in 2009 by Minotaur Books. In 2010 it was published by Ebury Press in the UK as Trail of Blood. Set partially in New York City and partially in the Shanghai Ghetto, the book follows Lydia Chin as she tries to recover a fictional stolen jewel also called The Shanghai Moon.

== Background ==
The book follows eight others in a series of eleven novels and six novellas by Rozan. The main characters, PIs Lydia Chin and her "sometimes-partner-in-crime-fighting" Bill Smith had been estranged since the previous novel, and Lydia had just returned from a trip to California.

== Plot ==
Another PI friend of Lydia's, Joel Pillarsky, hired her to help him find a number of antique gems, including potentially a brooch, the Shanghai Moon, which has become the stuff of legend. When Lydia finds this out, however, there has been a murder, she is fired from the case, and Bill Smith reappears, claiming to have heard of the gem while in the Navy.
