= Thick as Thieves (Spiegelman novel) =

2011 novel by Peter Spiegelman

- Author: Peter Spiegelman
- Language: English
- Genre: Crime
- Publisher: Knopf
- Publication date: July 26, 2011
- Publication place: United States
- Media type: Print (Softcover & Hardcover)
- Pages: 295
- ISBN: 978-0-3072-6317-9
- OCLC: 676726624

Thick as Thieves is a 2011 novel by American author Peter Spiegelman. The book is the fifth novel by Spiegelman and was released on July 26, 2011 in the United States through Knopf. The story surrounds a group of thieves following their reluctant leader Carr as he plans a million-dollar heist of a criminals compound. The novel was well received.

== Plot ==
Thick as Thieves follows a group of high-end criminals and their reluctant leader Carr. Carr was inducted as a thief by the group's previous leader, Declan (aka "Deke") who died during the getaway from their previous job, and feels that he is not the right person to take over the role, despite this having been Declans overall intention for him. The group plan to steal millions of dollars from a former hedge fund manager named Curtis Prager, who is now engaging in large amounts of illegal activity.

== Publication history ==
- 2011, USA, Knopf ISBN 978-0-3072-6317-9, pub date July 26, 2011, Hardback
- 2011, Dreamscape Media ISBN 978-1-6112-0292-2, pub date July 26, 2011, Audiobook
- 2011, UK, Quercus ISBN 978-0-8573-8842-1, pub date September 1, 2011, Hardback

== Reception ==
The book was well received, with reviewers praising Spiegelman's prose and ability to create an interesting story using a clichéd premise.

Tom Nolan, for the Wall Street Journal, stated that "there's no dearth of heart-pounding, pulse-racing, stomach-dropping moments" in the novel. He also praised the prose, stating that "Mr. Spiegelman describes things with flair", finding that "Such prose creates a special tension and pictorial vividness, to add to the book's intelligently structured thriller plot", concluding that "readers may find themselves lingering over many of these well-wrought phrases before racing to the final exciting page." Kirkus Reviews also praised Speigelmans writing, finding the novel to be "Character-driven with a protagonist as enigmatic as he is compelling. But what really sets this apart is the quality of Spiegelman's writing"; "it's not every day genre prose gets that kind of polish." Bruce Tierney, for BookPage, called the story a "genre-defining heist novel", concluding that "Thick as Thieves is a superbly crafted tale, pulsing with tension, twisty as a corkscrew and positively demanding to be read in one sitting." Rob Brunner, for Entertainment Weekly, awarded the novel a score of "B+", stating that while the novel features "some stock characters and a premise as clichéd as its title", it is also a "well-constructed crime thriller". Brunner goes on to state that he found the novel to be "a complex, satisfying tale" and praised "Spiegelman's sharp prose and deft plotting".

== Awards and nominations ==
The novel was recognised Kirkus Reviews editor Elaine Szewczyk as one of the "Best Fiction novels of 2011".
