= G. M. Ford =

American novelist (1945–2021)

Gerald M. Ford
- Born: Gerald Moody Ford; July 9, 1945
- Died: December 1, 2021 (aged 76)
- Education: Adelphi University (MA)
- Occupation: Novelist
- Spouse: Skye Kathleen Moody
- Writing career
- Pen name: G. M. Ford
- Language: English
- Genre: Crime

Gerald Moody Ford (July 9, 1945 – December 1, 2021) was an American crime and thriller novelist. He was credited as G. M. Ford.

== Biography ==
Ford's father died when he was young and as such he was brought up solely by his mother, who worked as a secretary. Ford attended Nathaniel Hawthorne College in New Hampshire (closed 1988) and ended up with a master's degree in 18th-century literature from Adelphi University in New York. Ford worked as a teacher of creative writing before becoming an author.

Ford died on December 1, 2021, at the age of 76.

== Career ==
Ford's first book, Who in Hell Is Wanda Fuca? was published in 1995. As well as being Ford's début novel, this book was the first in a series of 12 books based on the character Leo Waterman, a detective living and working in Seattle, Washington.

In 2001, Ford introduced the character Frank Corso in the novel Fury. This novel showed a different approach in Ford's writing style. Ford wrote five more Corso novels before publishing his first standalone novel, Nameless Night (Identity in the UK), in 2008. He subsequently published two other standalones, Nature of the Beast and Threshold.

== Bibliography ==
=== Leo Waterman series ===
- Who in Hell Is Wanda Fuca? (1995)
- Cast in Stone (1996)
- The Bum's Rush (1997)
- Slow Burn (1998)
- The Last Ditch (1999)
- The Deader the Better (2000)
- Thicker Than Water (2012)
- Chump Change (2014)
- Salvation Lake (2016)
- Family Values (2017)
- Soul Survivor (2018)
- Heavy on the Dead (2019)

=== Frank Corso series ===
- Fury (2001)
- Black River (2002)
- A Blind Eye (2003)
- Red Tide (2004)
- No Man's Land (2005)
- La casa dei corpi (2005)
- Blown Away (2006)

=== Standalone novels ===
- Nameless Night (Identity in UK) (2008)
- Nature of the Beast (2013)
- Threshold (2015)

== Awards ==
Ford's début novel, Who in Hell Is Wanda Fuca?, was nominated for the 1996 Anthony Award, the Shamus Award for Best First Novel, and the Dilys Award for Best Novel. The Deader the Better was nominated for the Best Novel Shamus Award in 2001. The second novel in the Frank Corso series, Black River, was recognised by The Seattle Times as one of the "Best Mysteries of 2002." The following year, Ford received the Pacific Northwest Writers Association's Achievement Award for both his literary success and, according to The Seattle Times, his "willingness to help others." The same year, he won the Spotted Owl Award for the best mystery novel by a Pacific Northwest writer for Black River. A Blind Eye was a nominee in 2004.
