= Andy Straka =

American novelist

Andy Straka (born September 29, 1958) is an American crime novelist. He won a Shamus Award.

== Life ==
Straka was born on September 29, 1958. Born and raised in upstate New York and a graduate of Williams College, he worked in publishing and medical sales for nearly fifteen years before turning to writing in the late 1990s. His debut private-eye novel, A Witness Above, garnered Shamus, Anthony, and Agatha Award nominations for Best First Novel in 2002. A Killing Sky received an Anthony Award nomination in 2003, and Straka's third book, Cold Quarry, won a 2004 Shamus Award. His series of six Frank Pavlicek novels features a former New York City police detective who also spends much of his time flying various hawks to help inspire him to solve criminal cases. The fourth novel in the Pavlicek series, Kitty Hitter, was called a "great read" by Library Journal. Kitty Hitter was re-released with a new title, The Night Falconer, as an e-book and paperback. A fifth book featuring Pavlicek is the novella Flightfall. Another full-length novel, The K Street Hunting Society, was released as book 6 in the Pavlicek series in 2014.

Straka's inaugural non-series novel, Record of Wrongs, was labelled "a first-rate thriller" by Mystery Scene magazine in 2008. His second non-series novel was The Blue Hallelujah. Publishers Weekly magazine also cited Straka among a featured group of "rising stars in crime fiction." His other books include the recently optioned for television sci-fi thriller series Dragonflies.

Straka also has written a short story, Directions For Disassembly Of An Old Set Of Swings, and he recently reworked his first novel, A Witness Above, into an edition for teenagers, including a falconry primer.

Straka's interests range from parenting and basketball (he was co-captain of his college team) to English and predatory birds (he is a licensed falconer). Straka appears at select conferences and events and is a frequent presenter at the nearly two-decades-old 'Virginia Festival of the Book, and he is a co-founder of the popular Crime Wave program of panels and speakers at the annual event.
