= Earl Emerson =

American mystery novelist and author

- Born: 1948 (age 77–78); Tacoma, Washington, U.S.
- Occupations: Novelist; author
- Writing career
- Genre: Mystery fiction
- Notable awards: Shamus Award (1986)
- Website: www.earlemerson.com

Earl Emerson (born 1948 in Tacoma, Washington, United States) is an American mystery novelist and author.

Emerson is the author of two series of mystery novels, the Mac Fontana series and the Thomas Black detective series, as well as several thrillers. He received the "Best Private Eye Novel" Shamus Award from the Private Eye Writers of America in 1986 for Poverty Bay and an Edgar award nomination for his work. Emerson also works as a lieutenant with the Seattle Fire Department.

Emerson now lives in North Bend, Washington.

== Bibliography ==
=== Thomas Black series ===
- The Rainy City (1985)
- Poverty Bay (1985)
- Nervous Laughter (1985)
- Fat Tuesday (1987)
- Deviant Behavior (1988)
- Yellow Dog Party (1991)
- The Portland Laugher (1994)
- The Vanishing Smile (1995)
- The Million-Dollar Tattoo (1996)
- Deception Pass (1997)
- Catfish Cafe (1999)
- Cape Disappointment (2009)
- Monica's Sister (2013)
- Two Miles of Darkness (2015)
- Jackson Street (2018)

=== Mac Fontana series ===
- Black Hearts and Slow Dancing (1988)
- Help Wanted: Orphans Preferred (1990)
- Morons and Madmen (1993)
- Going Crazy in Public (1996)
- The Dead Horse Paint Company (1997)

== Other books ==
- Vertical Burn (2002)
- Into the Inferno (2003)
- Pyro (2004)
- The Smoke Room (2005)
- Firetrap (2006)
- Primal Threat (2008)

== Awards ==
=== Wins ===
- 1986 Shamus award winner, best private eye paperback original, Poverty Bay

=== Nominations ===
- 1986 Anthony award, best paperback original novel, Poverty Bay
- 1986 Edgar award, best paperback original novel, Poverty Bay
- 1986 Shamus award, best private eye paperback original, The Rainy City
- 1987 Shamus award, best private eye paperback original, Nervous Laughter
- 1989 Shamus award, best private eye novel, Deviant Behavior
- 1994 Anthony award, best novel, Morons and Madmen
- 1996 Anthony award, best cover art, The Vanishing Smile
- 1996 Shamus award, best private eye novel, The Vanishing Smile
- 1998 Anthony award, best novel, Deception Pass
- 1998 Shamus award, best private eye novel, Deception Pass
