= Michael Wiley (author) =

American novelist

Michael Wiley is an American writer and professor. He has written twelve crime fiction novels and two works of literary criticism as well as short stories and articles. As an academic, he specializes in Romantic literature at the University of North Florida.

Wiley has written the Shamus Award-nominated Franky Dast mystery series and Sam Kelson series, the Daniel Turner thrillers, and the Shamus Award-winning Joe Kozmarski novels.

The first Franky Dast mystery, "Monument Road" (2017), nominated for the Shamus Award for Best Novel, features an exonerated death row inmate who investigates the crime that sent him to prison and the police detective who seemed obsessed with sending him there. In the second mystery in the series, "The Long Way Out" (2023), Franky Dast investigates a series of anti-immigrant murders.

The Sam Kelson mysteries "Trouble in Mind" (2019), "Lucky Bones" (2020), and the Shamus Award-nominated "Head Case" (2021) feature an oddball detective who suffers from disinhibition and cannot help but speak his mind.

The Daniel Turner thrillers include "Blue Avenue" (2014), "Second Skin" (2015), and "Black Hammock" (2016). All three books are set in contemporary Northeast Florida and South Georgia.

The Joe Kozmarski mysteries include "The Last Striptease" (2007), "The Bad Kitty Lounge" (2010), and "A Bad Night's Sleep" (2011). The series is set in contemporary Chicago. The Last Striptease won the PWA/SMP (Private Eye Writers of America/St. Martin's Press) prize for Best First Novel and was a nominee for a Shamus Award in the same category. "A Bad Night's Sleep" won the Best Hardback Shamus Award in 2012. Wiley's fiction has been praised broadly for reinvigorating the conventions of private detective novels, earning comparisons to Raymond Chandler and Dashiell Hammett along with other practitioners of PI writing.

Michael Wiley lives in Jacksonville, Florida, and teaches at the University of North Florida. He is also the author of two nonfiction books, "Romantic Geography" and "Romantic Migrations" as well as many articles, short stories, and book reviews.
