= Wolf in the Shadows =

1993 book written by Marcia Muller

- First edition
- Author: Marcia Muller
- Genre: Mystery fiction, Thriller, Crime
- Published: 1993
- Publisher: Mysterious Press
- Pages: 384
- Awards: Anthony Award for Best Novel (1994)
- ISBN: 978-0-446-40383-2
- Website: Wolf in the Shadows

Wolf in the Shadows is a 1993 book written by Marcia Muller and published by Mysterious Press The book that won the Anthony Award for Best Novel in 1994.
