= Karen Kijewski =

American writer of mystery novels (born 1943)

- Born: 1943 (age 82–83); Berkeley, California, U.S.
- Education: University of California, Berkeley (BA, MA)
- Occupation: Novelist
- Children: 2
- Writing career
- Language: English
- Genre: Mystery
- Notable work: Kat Colorado series

Karen Kijewski (pronounced key-EFF-ski; born 1943) is an American writer of mystery novels, known for her Kat Colorado series.

== Biography ==
Kijewski was born in Berkeley, California, the daughter of University of California, Berkeley professor Clarence Glacken, and received B.A. and M.A. degrees from UC-Berkeley. She was a high school English teacher in Massachusetts for almost a decade before dedicating herself to writing. A resident of Sacramento, California, she made a living tending a bar while establishing herself as a novelist.

Kijewski is married and has two daughters.

== Published works ==
- Katwalk (St. Martin's, 1989). ISBN 0312029691
- Katapult (St. Martin's, 1990). ISBN 0312046790
- Kat's Cradle (Doubleday, 1992). ISBN 0385420951
- Copy Kat (Doubleday, 1992). ISBN 038542096X
- Wild Kat (Doubleday, 1994). ISBN 0385468512
- Alley Kat Blues (Doubleday, 1995). ISBN 0385468520
- Honky Tonk Kat (G.P. Putnam, 1996). ISBN 0399141332
- Kat Scratch Fever (G.P. Putnam, 1997). ISBN 0399142452
- Stray Kat Waltz (G.P. Putnam, 1998). ISBN 0399143688

== Awards ==
Kijewski's first novel, Katwalk, received a mixed reception from reviewers; however it also won the 1990 Anthony Award and the Shamus Award the same year, both for "Best First Novel".
