= Virginia Lanier =

American novelist

- Born: Virginia Rudd Lanier; October 28, 1930; Madison County, Florida, U.S.
- Died: October 27, 2003 (aged 72); Fargo, Georgia, U.S.
- Occupation: Novelist
- Spouse: Robert Lanier
- Children: Michael Stewart
- Writing career
- Language: English
- Genre: Mystery
- Notable work: Jo Beth Sidden series

Virginia Rudd Lanier (October 28, 1930 – October 27, 2003) was an American mystery fiction writer, author of a series featuring bloodhound trainer Jo Beth Sidden.

== Biography ==
Lanier was born in Madison County, Florida in 1930. She was an orphan and was adopted by Ira and Mary Holt Rudd.

=== Death ===
Lanier died in her home in October 2003 after a long illness.

== Bibliography ==
Lanier published her first book in 1995 at age 65 after having thrown a book across the room in disgust and attempting to write something better herself.

=== Novels ===
- Death in Bloodhound Red (1995)
- The House on Bloodhound Lane (1996)
- A Brace of Bloodhounds (1997)
- Blind Bloodhound Justice (1998)
- Ten Little Bloodhounds (1998)
- A Bloodhound to Die For (2003)

=== Short stories ===
- "Bark M for Murder" (2006) (with J. A. Jance, Lee Charles Kelley and Chassie West)

=== Awards ===
Lanier's début novel Death in Bloodhound Red won the 1996 Anthony Award for "Best First Novel" and was also nominated for the same honour at the Agatha Awards the previous year. Her fourth novel, Blind Bloodhound Justice, was nominated for the 1998 Agatha Award in the "Best Novel" category. Lanier's last novel, A Bloodhound to Die For, was nominated for the Mary Higgins Clark Award at the 2004 Edgar Awards.

=== Adaptations ===
As of 1998, the Jo Beth Sidden series was optioned to be the basis for a Hollywood movie or a TV Mini-series. However, this project appears to have been scrapped.

== See also ==
- Mystery (fiction)
- List of female detective/mystery writers
- List of female detective characters
