= Clarence Glacken =

American historian

Clarence James Glacken (1909 – August 20, 1989) was an American Professor of Geography at the University of California, Berkeley. He was known for a 1967 magnum opus, Traces on the Rhodian Shore, that demonstrated how perceptions of the natural environment shaped the course of human events over millennia. He is recognised as a key contributor to the field of environmental history.

== Background ==
Glacken was born and raised in Sacramento, California, attending Sacramento Junior College (now Sacramento City College). He studied history and interdisciplinary studies at Berkeley (BA with highest honors 1930, MA in 1931, Department of Social Institutions). In the 1930s and 1940s, as America faced the Great Depression, he held several government jobs including a job with the Farm Security Administration assisting refugees fleeing the Mid West Dust Bowl and unemployment, in the Central Valley of California. In 1937, he travelled alone for a year through Europe and Asia, sparking his interest in the relationship between human ideas and the natural world.

In 1941, he was drafted into the U.S. Army, becoming an analyst and expert in Japanese language and culture. Discharged at the end of the war he took a job in Korea at the military government's Bureau of Health and Welfare, and found time for some geographical study of land cover change.

These experiences led to a desire to pursue scholarship. He finished a PhD in geography at Johns Hopkins University when in his forties, called “The Idea of the Habitable World.” (1949–1951). Later he undertook an ethnography of three villages in Okinawa, using his language skills, working for the Pacific Science Board of the National Research Council from 1951 to 1952. The study was later published as a book (Glacken, 1955).

In 1952, he was appointed by Carl Sauer as assistant professor of geography at the University of California, Berkeley, later becoming Professor. He pursued varied research interests and attended the landmark conference, Man's Role in Changing the Face of the Earth in 1955, led by colleague Carl Sauer. Glacken was Chair of the Berkeley Geography Department in the late 1960s, at a time of upheaval. He suffered a severe nervous breakdown in 1970, followed by a heart attack. In his last decade, as interest in his environmental ideas grew, he remained severely depressed and mentally ill, and although he completed a sequel to Traces on the Rhodian Shore in 1982 dealing with human-environment relationships in the 20th century, the manuscript was returned by University of California Press. He destroyed his copies, and only fragments survive. There is a plan to publish them.

He died in Sacramento at the age of 80, pre-deceased by his first wife (d.1941). His second wife was Mildred Mosher (b. 1913 in Pomona, CA died around 1982) with whom he had 2 children - the novelist Karen Kijewski, and a son Michael.

== Scholarship ==
Traces on the Rhodian Shore (1967) examined nature and culture in western thought from ancient times to the end of the 18th century. The book was hailed as monumental in its scope, "bringing together ideas on this vast and universal topic as they never had been before, transcending geography as a discipline but also being recognized as one of the truly great books written by a geographer in this century".

In this and in other volumes, Glacken showed how past generations contemplated and interpreted the mutual relations between nature and human cultures. "After more than a decade of research, Glacken concluded that there had been three major ideas in the history of Western environmental thought: the idea of a divinely designed earth (both ecological theory and the intelligent design argument are direct descendents), the idea of environmental influence on people (similar to the environmental determinism popular in early anthropology), and the idea of human influence on the environment."

== Awards ==
Association of American Geographers Citation for Meritorious Contributions to the Field of Geography, 1968.

== Key works ==
- Glacken, C.J. 1955. The Great Loochoo: A Study of Okinawan Village Life. University of California Press.
- Glacken, C.J. 1960. Count Buffon on cultural changes of the physical environment. Annals of the Association of American Geographers. 50: 1–22.
- Glacken, C.J. 1967. Traces on the Rhodian Shore: Nature and Culture in Western Thought from Ancient Times to the End of the Eighteenth Century. Berkeley: University of California Press.
- Glacken, C.J. 1970. Man Against Nature: an Outmoded Concept. In H. W. Helrich Jr. (ed.) The Environmental Crisis. New Haven: Yale University Press.(reprinted by Warner Modula Publications, 1972). pp. 127–42.
- Glacken, C.J. 1970. Man and Nature in Recent Western Thought. In Michael Hamilton (ed.) This little planet . New York: Scribners. pp. 163–201.
