= Carlos Dews =

American writer and university professor

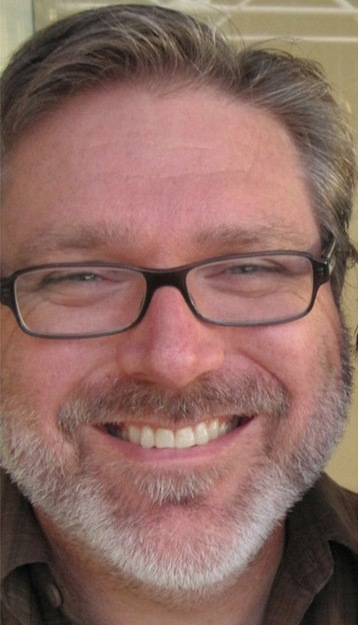
- Dews in 2010
- Born: Carlos Lee Barney Dews; September 26, 1963 (age 63); Nacogdoches, Texas, U.S.
- Education: University of Texas at Austin (BA); University of Minnesota (MA, PhD); New School University (MFA)
- Occupations: Academic, writer
- Writing career
- Pen name: C. L. Barney Dews, Carlos L. Dews, C. L. Dews, Sam Cabot
- Genres: Biography, Thrillers
- Subject: Carson McCullers
- Notable works: Illumination and Night Glare: The Unfinished Autobiography of Carson McCullers, ed.
- Website: www.carlosdews.com

Carlos Dews (born September 26, 1963) is an American writer and university professor. He is the chair of the Department of English Language and Literature at John Cabot University in Rome, Italy. He co-writes a paranormal thriller series with S. J. Rozan under the pseudonym Sam Cabot.

== Life and career ==
Carlos Lee Barney Dews was born September 26, 1963, in Nacogdoches, Texas, the son of Carl and Lois Dews. He grew up there on a farm where his father bred and sold fighting cocks throughout east Texas and western Louisiana. He graduated from the University of Texas at Austin with a B.A. (with honors) in Humanities, and was conferred M.A. and Ph.D. degrees in American Literature by the University of Minnesota. He was tenured and promoted to associate professor at the University of West Florida in 1999. A Carson McCullers scholar, Dews served from 2001 to 2003 as the founding director of the Carson McCullers Center for Writers and Musicians at Columbus State University in McCullers’s hometown of Columbus, Georgia.

After ten years of university teaching, in 2006 Dews returned to graduate school at the New School University in New York. Following completion of an M.F.A. in Fiction Writing in 2008, he relocated to Rome, Italy, where he is an associate professor and chair of the Department of English Language and Literature at John Cabot University, director of the Institute for Creative Writing and Literary Translation, and director of Italy Reads in Rome. He was promoted to full professor at John Cabot University in 2014.

When a friend introduced him to the work of Carson McCullers, Dews discovered an affinity for her writing. This led to his doctoral dissertation on her unfinished autobiography. Five years later, after working for ten years to get permission to publish the work, he edited Illumination and Night Glare, the book based on her dictated notes for that autobiography. He added a detailed introduction and chronology, letters from World War II between McCullers and her husband to supplement the text's disjointed account, and included her outline from The Heart is a Lonely Hunter—initially called "The Mute". About Illumination, a review said, "Thanks to the diligent work of Carlos Dews...we are given another opportunity to look at the exceptional fiction writer (McCullers)...Dews bestows a great gift by including The Mute in his edition..."

He was interviewed for The Oprah Winfrey Show in April 2004, discussing Carson McCullers's book The Heart Is a Lonely Hunter, for which Oprah's Book Club lists Dews as an expert. His co-writing thrillers with S. J. Rozan started by telling friends he had an idea for a novel and asking if they knew someone who might be able to collaborate with him. Dews is on the faculty of Art Workshop International in Assisi, Italy, where he teaches creative writing. He is a member of the Authors Guild, International Thriller Writers, American Literature Association, and the Carson McCullers Society (past president).

== Bibliography ==
Dews's published work includes:

=== Fiction ===
==== Books (as Sam Cabot) ====
- Blood of the Lamb: A Novel of Secrets, Penguin/Blue Rider, 2013. ISBN 978-0-399-16295-4
- Skin of the Wolf: A Novel, Penguin/Blue Rider, 2014. ISBN 978-0-399-16296-1

Sam Cabot books are co-written with S. J. Rozan

==== Short stories ====
- "Pueraria lobata", Rebel Yell 2, ed. Jay Quinn, Harrington Park Press, 2002, pp. 237–250. ISBN 1-56023-158-0
- "Recoleta" Scrivener Creative Review No. 32, Spring 2007, pp. 21–29.
- "The Other Borges: A Fiction", Conjunctions, April 4, 2007.

=== Non-fiction ===
==== Books ====
- This Fine Place So Far from Home: Voices of Academics from the Working Class, eds. Dews & Carolyn Leste Law, Temple University Press, 1995. ISBN 1-56639-290-X
- Illumination and Night Glare: The Unfinished Autobiography of Carson McCullers, ed. Dews, University of Wisconsin Press, 1999. ISBN 0-299-16440-3
  in translation
  spanish · Iluminación y fulgor nocturno : autobiografia inacabada, trans. Ana María Moix & Ana Becciú, Seix Barral, 2001. ISBN 84-322-0856-6
  french · Illuminations et nuits blanches : autobiographie inachevée, trans. Jacques Tournier, 10/18, 2001. ISBN 2-264-03145-X
  german · Die Autobiographie. Illumination and night glare (von Carson McCullers), trans. Brigitte Walitzek, Schöffling, 2002. ISBN 3-89561-609-5
  russian · Ozareniye i nochnaya likhoradka : neokonchennaya avtobiografiya Karson Makkallers, trans. Mayya Tugusheva, KRUK-Prestizh, 2005. ISBN 5-901838-40-8
- The Complete Novels of Carson McCullers, ed. Dews, Library of America, 2001. ISBN 978-1-931082-03-7

==== Chapters ====
- "Carson McCullers" American National Biography, eds. John A. Garraty & Mark C. Carnes, Oxford University Press, 1999, v. 14, pp. 944–946. ISBN 0-19-512793-5 / 24 v. set ISBN 0-19-520635-5
- "McCullers, Carson" Reader's Guide to Lesbian and Gay Studies, ed. Timothy F. Murphy, Fitzroy Dearborn, 2000, pp. 381–383. ISBN 1-57958-142-0
- "Carson McCullers" The New Georgia Encyclopedia Companion to Georgia Literature, eds. Hugh Ruppersburg & John C. Inscoe, University of Georgia Press, 2007, pp. 298–303. ISBN 978-0-8203-2876-8
- "Carson McCullers (1917-1967): 'The Brutal Humiliation of Human Dignity' in the South" Georgia Women: Their Lives and Times–Volume 2, eds. Ann Short Chirhart & Kathleen Ann Clark, University of Georgia Press, 2014, pp. 281–298. ISBN 978-0-8203-3784-5

==== Article ====
- "Illumination & Night Glare: Excerpts from an Unfinished Autobiography by Carson McCullers" (cover story) Oxford American, 1998, no. 20, pp. 32–45.
- "The Great Eaters of Georgia" (a previously unpublished essay) by Carson McCullers (eds. Dews & James Mayo) Oxford American, Spring 2005, no. 49, pp. 80–85.

==== Dissertation ====
- Illumination and Night Glare: The Unfinished Autobiography of Carson McCullers, C. L. Barney Dews (Carlos Lee Barney), Ph.D., University of Minnesota, 1994, 2 v., 485 leaves.
