= Collin Wilcox (writer) =

American novelist

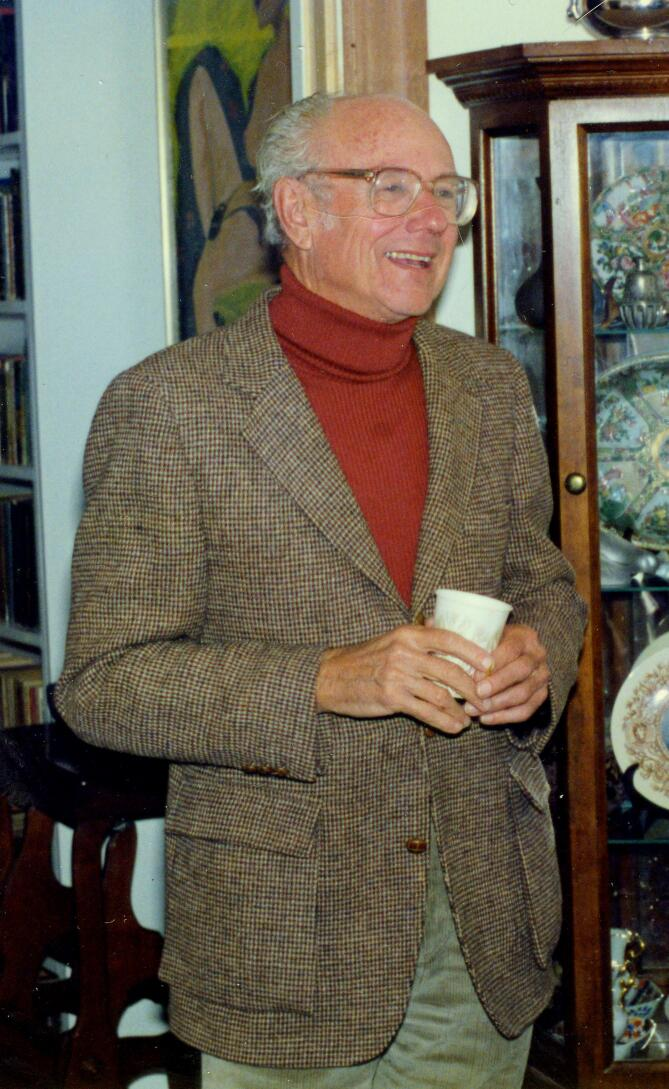
- Collin Wilcox in San Francisco in 1991
- Born: 21 September 1924; Detroit, Michigan
- Died: 12 July 1996 (aged 71); San Francisco, California
- Occupation: Writer
- Writing career
- Language: English

Collin Wilcox (September 21, 1924 – July 12, 1996) was an American mystery writer who published 30 books in 30 years.

Born in Detroit, Michigan, September 21, 1924, his first book was The Black Door (1967), featuring a sleuth possessing extrasensory perception. His major series of novels was about Lieutenant Frank Hastings of the San Francisco Police Department. Titles in the Hastings series included Hire a Hangman, Dead Aim, Hiding Place, Long Way Down and Stalking Horse. Two of his last books, Full Circle and Find Her a Grave, featured a new hero-sleuth, Alan Bernhardt, an eccentric theater director. Wilcox also published under the pseudonym "Carter Wick".

Wilcox's most famous series-detective was the television character Sam McCloud, a New Mexico deputy solving New York crime. The "urban cowboy" was played by Dennis Weaver in the 1970–1977 TV series McCloud. Wilcox wrote two novelizations based on scripts from the series: McCloud (1972) and The New Mexican Connection (1974).

Wilcox died in San Francisco, July 12, 1996, from cancer at the age of 71. Wilcox was survived by two sons, Christopher of Berkeley, California, Jeff of Lafayette, California, and five grandchildren. His five grandchildren are Scotty, Conor, Hayley, Jessica, and Emma.

== Frank Hastings books ==
Frank Hastings is a fictional detective in the Homicide Detail of the San Francisco Police Department, who is the main character in a police procedural series by Wilcox.

Hastings is a divorced man who came to the law enforcement profession comparatively late in life. Like his creator, he was born and raised in Detroit, Michigan. After graduating from college, he was briefly a professional football player in the Detroit Lions. After his marriage went sour, he moved west and eventually joined the SFPD. He rose quickly in the department and is now the junior lieutenant in Homicide, subordinate to his close friend, Lieutenant Pete Friedman. Most of the Hastings novels are first-person narratives told by Hastings himself, but some later books in the series are told in the third person.

One of the entries in the series, Twospot, was a collaboration between Wilcox and Bill Pronzini. It teamed Hastings with Pronzini's popular series character, a middle-aged San Francisco private investigator referred to by fans as the Nameless Detective. Hastings and "Nameless" alternate as narrators of the novel.

The Hastings series was widely praised in publications like The Armchair Detective for their convincing characters, strong plots, and vivid portrayal of San Francisco.

== Bibliography ==
- The Lonely Hunter (1969)
- The Disappearance (1970)
- Dead Aim (1971)
- Hiding Place (1973)
- Long Way Down (1974)
- Aftershock (1975)
- Doctor, Lawyer (1977)
- Twospot (1978) with Bill Pronzini (crossover with Pronzini's Nameless Detective series)
- The Watcher (1978)
- Power Plays (1979)
- Mankiller (1980)
- Stalking Horse (1982)
- Victims (1984)
- Night Games (1986)
- The Pariah (1988)
- Death Before Dying (1990)
- Hire a Hangman (1991)
- Dead Center (1992)
- Switchback (1993)
- Calculated Risk (1995)

== See also ==
- Crime fiction
- Detective fiction
- Whodunit
- List of crime writers
- List of mystery writers
