= Death in Bloodhound Red =

1995 mystery novel by Virginia Lanier

- First edition
- Author: Virginia Lanier
- Genre: Mystery fiction, Thriller
- Published: 1995
- Publisher: Pineapple Press
- Pages: 544
- Awards: Anthony Award for Best First Novel (1996)
- ISBN: 978-0-061-01025-5

Death in Bloodhound Red is a mystery novel by American author Virginia Lanier. It was published by Pineapple Press on 1 March 1995 and went on to win the Anthony Award for Best First Novel in 1996.

== Plot introduction ==
The novel is set in and around the Okefenokee Swamp in Georgia. The main character, Jo Beth Sidden, is an outspoken feminist bloodhound trainer who assists law enforcement with search and rescue. When she is accused of attacking her ex-husband, Jo Beth takes matters into her own hands.
