= Brad Parks (author) =

American novelist

- Born: July 13, 1974 (age 52); New Jersey, U.S.
- Education: Ridgefield High School; Dartmouth College
- Occupation: Author
- Children: 2
- Writing career
- Genres: Mystery fiction; thriller
- Notable awards: Shamus Award (2010, 2014); Nero Award (2010)
- Website: bradparksbooks.com

Brad Parks (born July 13, 1974) is an American author of mystery novels and thrillers. He is the winner of the 2010 and 2014 Shamus Award, the 2010 Nero Award and the 2013 and 2014 Lefty Award. He is the only author to have won all three of those awards. He writes both standalone domestic suspense novels and a series featuring investigative reporter Carter Ross, who covers crime for a fictional newspaper The Newark Eagle-Examiner, based in Newark, New Jersey. His novels are known for mixing humor with the gritty realism of their urban setting. Library Journal has called him "a gifted storyteller (with shades of Mark Twain or maybe Dave Barry)."

== Early life and education ==
Parks was born in New Jersey and grew up in Ridgefield, Connecticut, where he attended Ridgefield High School. He first started writing professionally for The Ridgefield Press, his hometown newspaper at the time, at age 14, covering high school sports.

Parks attended Dartmouth College, where he founded his own newspaper, The Sports Weekly (now defunct) and sang with the Dodecaphonics, a co-ed a cappella group at the college. While still a student, he worked as a stringer for The New York Times and as an intern at The Boston Globe.

== Career ==
=== Journalism ===
After graduating Phi Beta Kappa from Dartmouth College in 1996, he interned at The Washington Post, and was eventually hired full-time by the paper, which assigned him to their bureau in Manassas, Virginia.

In 1998, he moved to The Star-Ledger in Newark, New Jersey, where he began working as a sports features writer and later as a news feature writer. In 2007, "Crossroads", his four-part series on the 1967 Newark riots, won the New Jersey Press Association's top prize for enterprise reporting.

=== Fiction ===
In 2004, Parks began writing fiction in the cafe at a Barnes & Noble as a way to kill time while his wife was studying for her graduate degree. Parks has written some of his novels at a Hardee's restaurant. In response, in March 2018, Hardee's presented Parks with a plaque and declared him its writer in residence.

==== Faces of the Gone ====
The inspiration for his first published novel, Faces of the Gone, was a 2004 quadruple homicide in Newark, New Jersey that he covered as a journalist.

In 2008, the novel was acquired by St. Martin's Press/Minotaur Books and was published on December 8, 2009. Prior to publication, Harlan Coben called it a "terrific debut." Library Journal gave it a starred review, calling it "the most hilariously funny and deadly serious mystery debut since Janet Evanovich's One for the Money." The novel went on to win the 2010 Shamus Award for best first novel; and the 2010 Nero Award for best American mystery. Faces of the Gone is the only book to have ever won both awards.

==== Eyes of the Innocent ====
Parks' second book, Eyes of the Innocent, was based on Parks' reporting of the Subprime mortgage crisis and House flipping that became common in Newark, New Jersey and other cities prior to the 2008 financial crisis. It received a starred review from Library Journal, which called it "as good if not better (than) his acclaimed debut." The Wall Street Journal described protagonist Ross as "engaging" and said the book was "a capable follow-up to this author's award-winning debut." The Free Lance–Star described it as "a book that melds the style of a Bob Woodward and a Janet Evanovich."

==== The Girl Next Door ====
Parks' third book, The Girl Next Door, delves into the struggles of the newspaper industry and how a contentious union negotiation ends up imperiling a woman described as being like the girl next door. The novel won the Lefty Award for best humorous mystery. In doing so, Parks became the first author to have won the Lefty, Nero and Shamus Awards. The Girl Next Door also received a starred review from Booklist, which called it "... a masterpiece." Library Journal called the Carter Ross series "a refreshing tonic for the mystery soul.". Shelf Awareness gave it a starred review, calling it "perfect for the reader who loves an LOL moment but wants a mystery that's more than empty calories." Kirkus Reviews named it one of the top 100 works of fiction of 2012, making it one of just a handful of mysteries to win that honor.

==== The Good Cop ====
Parks' fourth book, The Good Cop, deals with the subject of illegal gun smuggling and starts with the suicide of a Newark, New Jersey police officer. It received a starred review from Booklist, which called it "a tautly written page-turner with charm and humor." Library Journal opined "Parks's award-winning series is essential reading." RT Book Reviews said the book "will please even the most discerning reader." The Associated Press called it "a great lighthearted read." It won the 2014 Shamus Award in the category of Best Hardcover Novel. In doing so, Parks became the first former Best First Shamus Award winner to subsequently win Best Hardcover Novel.

==== The Player ====
The fifth book in the Carter Ross series, The Player, delves into the topics of toxic waste and organized crime. It received starred reviews from Kirkus Reviews and Library Journal. The Washington Post called it "one of the best portraits of a working reporter since (Michael) Connelly's THE POET." RT Book Reviews made it a "Top Pick!" and opined, "Parks has quietly entered the top echelon of the mystery field."

==== The Fraud ====
The sixth book in the series, The Fraud, chronicles two incidents of carjacking, one afflicting a wealthy man from the suburbs, the other a poorer man from the city. Kirkus Reviews called it, “More deeply felt than Carter’s first five cases: reliable entertainment that’ll make you think twice about your next trip to Newark.” The novel was nominated for a Library of Virginia People's Choice Award in 2016.

==== Say Nothing ====
Parks released his first standalone novel, and his first novel published by Dutton Books in 2017, Say Nothing, which tells the story of a judge whose children are kidnapped by people who are looking to control the outcome of a case the judge is hearing. It received endorsements from Lee Child, Sue Grafton, Jeffery Deaver, Joseph Finder, Chris Pavone, and William Landay, in addition to starred reviews from Publishers Weekly, Kirkus, and Library Journal. The Washington Post called it, "deeply moving. How moving? Its ending brought me to tears, and, where books are concerned, such moments are rare." The Richmond Times-Dispatch called it "the work of an author who continues to raise his sights and refine his immense talent."

Say Nothing has been translated into fifteen languages and sold in dozens of countries worldwide. In 2007, it was named Thriller of the Month by The Times of London. It became a bestseller in Germany, where it appeared for multiple weeks in Der Spiegel's Buchreport. It won the Library of Virginia People's Choice Award.

==== Closer Than You Know ====
In March 2018, Parks published Closer Than You Know, which received starred reviews from Library Journal and Kirkus Reviews. Kirkus Reviews wrote that it was "another irresistible descent into hell."

== Personal life ==
Parks lives in Virginia with his wife and two small children.

== Bibliography ==
1. Faces of the Gone (2009, ISBN 978-0312672805); Winner, 2010 Shamus Award; Winner, 2010 Nero Award
2. Eyes of the Innocent (2011, ISBN 978-1250002280)
3. The Girl Next Door (2012, ISBN 978-0312667689); Winner, 2013 Lefty Award
4. The Good Cop (2013, ISBN 978-1250005526); Winner, 2014 Shamus Award; Winner, 2014 Lefty Award
5. The Player (2014, ISBN 9781250044082)
6. The Fraud (2015, ISBN 9781250064400); Finalist, Library of Virginia People's Choice Award
7. Say Nothing (2017, ISBN 9781101985595); Winner, Library of Virginia People's Choice Award
8. Closer Than You Know (March 2018, ISBN 9781101985625)
9. The Last Act (2019, ISBN 9781524743536)
10. Interference (2020, ISBN 9781542023399)
11. Unthinkable (2021, ISBN 9781542024952)
12. The Boundaries We Cross (2024, ISBN 9781608096244)
