= Peter Spiegelman =

American novelist

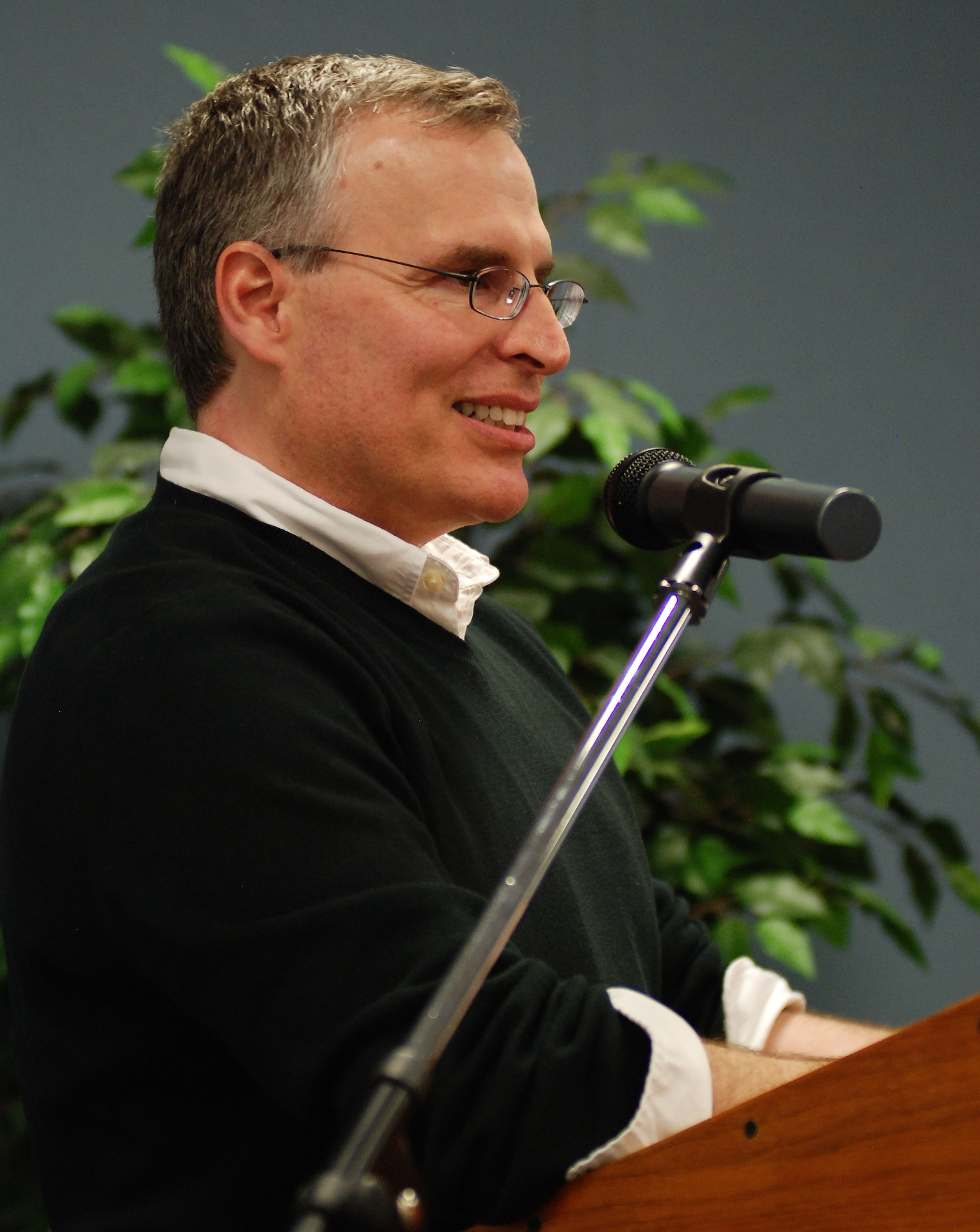
- Spiegelman at the St. Louis County Library, 2011
- Born: 1958 (age 67–68)
- Education: Vassar College
- Occupation: Author
- Spouse: Alice Wang
- Writing career
- Period: English
- Genre: Crime
- Notable work: John March series
- Notable awards: Shamus Award

Peter Spiegelman (born 1958) is an American crime fiction author and former Wall Street executive. He is most known for his series of books following the cases of the Manhattan-based private eye, John March, winning a Shamus Award for the first novel in the series. He lives with his family in Connecticut.

== Biography ==
Spiegelman grew up in Forest Hills, Queens and, creating his own home made superhero comic books, was interested in writing from a young age. He attended boarding school and studied English as an undergraduate at Vassar College, New York, winning the Beatrice Daw Brown prize for "a member of the senior class who has demonstrated excellence in the composition of poetry".

Spiegelman then "sobered up and realized I had to pay the rent" and worked for twenty years in the financial services industry; starting out as a computer programmer for a small consulting firm and ending up as a vice president of J.P. Morgan. He followed this by becoming a junior partner for The Frustum Group, a company that sold computer software to large financial institutions, until, in 2001, it was sold for "a "high eight-figure" sum" allowing him the financial freedom to return to writing. Speaking about his time on the trading floor, Spiegelman stated that "it's a great place to study dysfunctional egos and uncompromising greed - great for an aspiring novelist. Wall Street is such a 'noirish' place."

He was influenced by Dashiell Hammett, Raymond Chandler, and Ross Macdonald. He currently lives in Ridgefield, Connecticut, with his wife Alice Wang, a managing director at J. P. Morgan.

== Bibliography ==
=== John March series ===
The series of books follows John March, an ex-deputy Sheriff and current Manhattan-based private eye. Spiegelman came up with the character "during his drives from Ridgefield" to his workplace in White Plains, New York.

- 2003 Black Maps
- 2005 Death's Little Helpers (in the UK market, this book was initially published in as False Dawn and later as No Way Home)
- 2007 Red Cat (aka The Alibi League)
- 2007 This Year's Model (short-story)

=== Standalone works ===
- 2007 Wall Street Noir (short-story collection, editor)
- 2011 Thick as Thieves
- 2016 Dr. Knox: A Novel
- 2022 A Secret About a Secret

=== Awards ===
His first novel, Black Maps, earned him the 2004 Shamus Award in the "Best First P. I. novel" category. The third novel of the John March series, Red Cat, was nominated for the 2008 Barry Award for "Best Novel". His fourth novel, Thick as Thieves, was recognised by Kirkus Reviews editor Elaine Szewczyk as one of the "Best Fiction [novels] of 2011".
