= Ruth Cavin =

American book editor (1918–2011)

- Born: Ruth Brodie; October 15, 1918; Pittsburgh, Pennsylvania, U.S.
- Died: January 9, 2011 (aged 92); White Plains, New York, U.S.
- Occupations: Book editor, author
- Known for: Associate publisher at Thomas Dunne Books; editing and publishing 900 books, specializing in mystery fiction
- Spouse: Bram Cavin
- Children: Nora Cavin, Emily Cavin, Tony Cavin
- Awards: Malice Domestic Award for Lifetime Achievement (posthumously)

Ruth Cavin (October 15, 1918 – January 9, 2011) was an American book editor who worked as an associate publisher of Thomas Dunne Books, an imprint of St. Martin's Press, where she started working at age 70 and oversaw the publication of 900 books. Mystery fiction was her specialty in her two decades in the business.

== Early life and education ==
Cavin was born Ruth Brodie in Pittsburgh, Pennsylvania, to Jewish immigrants who taught her how to read as a young child. She attended Carnegie Institute of Technology, earning her undergraduate degree there in 1939 and married Bram Cavin, a journalist with BusinessWeek whom she met after moving to New York City. She lived the life of a typical suburban housewife, raising her twin daughters in suburban Westchester County, New York, and didn't begin her publishing career until 1979, when she started editing books for Walker & Company.

== Editing and publishing career ==
Hired by St. Martin's Press to work at its Thomas Dunne Books unit when she was already in her 70s, Cavin helped develop first novels by such mystery fiction authors as Donna Andrews, Steve Hamilton, Julia Spencer-Fleming and Laurie R. King. The Malice Domestic Contest, a yearly competition honoring best first mystery novels, was begun by St. Martin's Press based on Cavin's suggestion. Earning the nickname "First Lady of Mysteries" that adorned a plaque in her office, author Sue Grafton called Cavin "soul mother to mystery writers for years". St. Martin's Press, the parent of Thomas Dunne Books, celebrated Cavin's 90th birthday in December 2008, honoring her 20 years as an editor. She helped edit and publish 900 books in a broad range of genres during her tenure at St. Martin's Press, continuing to work as an editor until 2010 when she was diagnosed with lung cancer. Cavin used the pen names Sally Brodie and Jennie Soble to write a number of her own books, including Trolleys and Complete Party Dinners for the Novice Cook, a book that she had originally conceived of as Dinners for Beginners.

== Personal life ==
She and her husband, Bram Cavin, had twin daughters, Nora and Emily, and a son, Tony. Her husband died in 2009. Cavin died at the age of 92 at White Plains Hospital in White Plains, New York, on January 9, 2011, due to lung cancer.
