= Richard S. Prather =

American novelist (1921–2007)

- 1964 Trident Press publicity photo
- Born: Richard Scott Prather; September 9, 1921; Santa Ana, California, U.S.
- Died: February 14, 2007 (aged 85)
- Education: Riverside Junior College
- Spouse: Tina Hager (m. 1945; died 2004)
- Writing career
- Pen name: David Knight; Douglas Ring
- Genre: Mystery

Richard Scott Prather (September 9, 1921 – February 14, 2007) was an American mystery novelist, best known for creating the "Shell Scott" series. He also wrote under the pseudonyms David Knight and Douglas Ring.

== Biography ==
Prather was born in Santa Ana, California and spent a year at Riverside Junior College (now Riverside Community College). He served in the United States Merchant Marine during World War II, from 1942 through the end of the war, in 1945. That year he married Tina Hager and began working as a civilian chief clerk of surplus property at March Air Force Base in Riverside, California. He left that job to become a full-time writer in 1949. The first Shell Scott mystery, Case of the Vanishing Beauty, was published in 1950. It would be the start of a long series that numbered more than three dozen titles featuring the Shell Scott character.

A Shell Scott Mystery Magazine was published in 1966, but lasted only nine issues. A short Shell Scott novel featured as written by Prather was included in each issue.

At Prather's death in 2007, he had completed but not published his last Shell Scott Mystery. His final novel, The Death Gods, was published October 2011, in print and ebook formats by Pendleton Artists, with permission of the Richard S. Prather Estate and Linda Pendleton.

== Publisher ==
Prather had a disagreement with his publisher, Pocket Books, and sued them in 1975. He gave up writing for several years and grew avocados. In 1986, he returned with The Amber Effect. In 1987, Prather's penultimate book, Shellshock, was published in hardcover by Tor Books. He donated his papers to the Richard S. Prather Manuscript Collection at the University of Wyoming, in Laramie, Wyoming.

== Personal life ==
Prather's wife, Tina Hager, died in April 2004 after 58 years of marriage.

== Awards and honors ==
- Private Eye Writers of America Lifetime Achievement Award (1986)
- Twice served on the board of directors of the Mystery Writers of America

== Bibliography ==
=== Shell Scott novels ===
- Case of the Vanishing Beauty — 1950
- Bodies in Bedlam — 1951
- Everybody Had a Gun — 1951
- Find This Woman — 1951
- Dagger of Flesh — 1952
- Darling, It's Death — 1952
- Way of a Wanton — 1952
- Always Leave 'em Dying — 1953
- Ride a High Horse a.k.a. Too Many Crooks — 1953
- Pattern for Panic — 1954
- Strip for Murder — 1955
- The Wailing Frail — 1956
- Have Gat - Will Travel (short stories) — 1957
- Three's a Shroud (novelettes) — 1957
- The Scrambled Yeggs (published in 1952 as Pattern for Murder under pseudonym "David Knight") — 1958
- Slab Happy — 1958
- Take a Murder, Darling — 1958
- Over Her Dear Body — 1959
- Double in Trouble (with Stephen Marlowe, co-starring Marlowe's series character Chester Drum) — 1959
- Dance with the Dead — 1960
- Dig That Crazy Grave — 1961
- Shell Scott's Seven Slaughters (short stories) — 1961
- Kill the Clown — 1962
- Dead Heat — 1963
- The Cockeyed Corpse — 1964
- Joker in the Deck — 1964
- The Trojan Hearse — 1964
- Dead Man's Walk — 1965
- Kill Him Twice — 1965
- The Meandering Corpse — 1965
- The Kubla Khan Caper — 1966
- Gat Heat — 1967
- The Cheim Manuscript — 1969
- Kill Me Tomorrow — 1969
- The Shell Scott Sampler (short stories) — 1969
- Dead-Bang — 1971
- The Sweet Ride — 1972
- The Sure Thing — 1975
- The Amber Effect — 1986
- Shellshock — 1987
- The Death Gods — 2011

=== Other novels ===
- Lie Down, Killer — 1952

=== Novellas ===
- The Sleeper Caper — 2009 (Shell Scott story originally published in the March 1953 issue of Manhunt, republished in 2009 as a Kindle edition in the Masters of Noir series)

As David Knight

- Pattern for Murder — 1952 (originally a stand-alone novel, rewritten as a Shell Scott novel and republished in 1958 as The Scrambled Yeggs under Prather's name)
- Dragnet: Case No. 561 — 1956

As Douglas Ring

- The Peddler — 1952 (Republished in 2006 by Hard Case Crime under Prather's name)

=== As editor ===
- The Comfortable Coffin, stories by Ellery Queen, Evan Hunter, Stanley Ellin, Erle Stanley Gardner, and others
