= No Colder Place =

1997 mystery novel by S. J. Rozan

- Author: S. J. Rozan
- Genre: Mystery fiction, Crime
- Published: 1997
- Publisher: St. Martin's Paperbacks
- Pages: 304
- Awards: Anthony Award for Best Novel (1998)
- ISBN: 978-0-312-96664-5
- Website: No Colder Place

No Colder Place is a mystery novel written by S. J. Rozan and published by St. Martin's Paperbacks in 1997, which later went on to win the Anthony Award for Best Novel in 1998.
