= Katwalk =

1989 book by Karen Kijewski

- Author: Karen Kijewski
- Genre: Mystery fiction, Crime
- Published: 1989
- Publisher: St. Martin's Press
- Pages: 240
- Awards: Anthony Award for Best First Novel (1990)
- ISBN: 978-0-380-71187-1

Katwalk is a book written by Karen Kijewski and published by St. Martin's Press which later went on to win the Anthony Award for Best First Novel in 1990.
