= Nameless Detective =

Protagonist in a long-running mystery series by writer Bill Pronzini

- First appearance: "It's A Lousy World" (short story, 1968)
- Last appearance: Endgame (novel, 2017)
- Created by: Bill Pronzini

In-universe information
- Gender: Male
- Occupation: Private detective
- Nationality: American

The Nameless Detective is the protagonist in a long-running mystery series by Bill Pronzini set in the San Francisco area.

== Overview ==
The character made his debut in the short story "It's a Lousy World", published in 1968. The first novel, The Snatch, was published in 1971. The series concluded in 2017 with the novel Endgame. There are 40 novels featuring "Nameless," several novellas, and four short story collections.

Though the character's full name is never revealed in the series (his infrequently mentioned first name is Bill), some background details of the detective's life have been occasionally mentioned. An Italian American (Quarry, 1992), born and raised in Outer Mission, San Francisco (Zigzag, 2016), he was raised by a devoutly Roman Catholic mother, and an abusive alcoholic father, as described in Demons (1993). He retains enough of the Italian he heard and spoke as a child to be able to follow conversations in the language. Nameless served in U.S. military intelligence during the Vietnam War era, and then became a police officer before working as a private investigator. He had an on-again, off-again romance with a woman named Kerry; the pair married in Hardcase (1995). He is slightly overweight and not especially physically fit; a connoisseur of beer and a collector of old pulp magazines. He does not carry a firearm as a matter of routine, though he will arm himself if going into an especially dangerous situation.

Though the character ages, it's not aligned with real time. Each book is set in the present day around the time of publication, but Nameless is 47 in 1971's The Snatch, 58 in 1992's Epitaphs, and somewhere in his mid-seventies in 2017's Endgame. Single at the start of the series, he eventually falls into an on-and-off relationship with Kerry, who works in advertising. They eventually marry in the mid-1990s, and Nameless becomes a stepfather to Kerry's daughter Emily from a previous marriage.

Originally, Nameless worked as a solo P.I. with a one-man agency; in the 1980s, he took on a partner, 'Eb' Eberhardt, who had been seen as Nameless's police contact in early novels. Nameless and Eb were often at odds, mainly due to Eberhardt's girlfriends who Nameless (and especially Kerry) found difficult or unlikable for various reasons. Eventually, after a run of nearly a dozen novels and stories, their friendship and partnership was permanently severed as Eberhardt quit the agency at the end of 1992's Epitaphs. Nameless then took on Tamara Corbin (who was far more skilled at modern cyber-sleuthing) as a partner, and a few years later, also hired hard-nosed ex-cop Jake Runyon as another field operative.

As the character ages, he eases into semi-retirement in the 2000s (when he's in his mid-sixties), coming into the agency he founded two days a week. In the later novels and stories, investigations and stories often focus as much on his younger partners Jake and Tamara as they do on "Nameless".

Though usually not referred to by name, other characters do identify the "Nameless" character as "Bill" in brief references at least four books: Double (1984), Boobytrap (1998), Strangers (2014), and Endgame (2017). His last name is never revealed, although people he encounters claim that it's distinctly, even unmistakably, Italian and Nameless himself makes note (in 1992's Epitaphs) of "all those vowels" contained in his name.

Thrilling Detective cites Pronzini as stating that when he imagines the Nameless Detective, he sees Bill Pronzini. However, Nameless and Pronzini (though both Italian-Americans from the San Francisco area) have different biographical backgrounds. Notably, Nameless is considerably older than Pronzini; Nameless is established as a WWII veteran, while Pronzini was born in 1943. Pronzini was also born and raised in Petaluma, about 32 miles north of San Francisco, while Nameless was born and raised in the very southernmost part of San Francisco known as The Outer Mission.

The Readers' Advisory Guide to Mystery describes Nameless as rooted in the classic private investigators of American mystery fiction, but updated as a "more realistic detective, someone who ages and changes" over the course of the series.

Two of the novels have been co-written with other authors: Twospot with Colin Wilcox, and Double with Marcia Muller, Pronzini's wife. Each book paired Nameless with one of the other writer's own respective sleuths: Wilcox's Frank Hastings, and Muller's Sharon McCone.

== Nameless Detective bibliography ==
=== Novels ===
1. The Snatch, Random House, (1971)
2. The Vanished, Random House, (1973)
3. Undercurrent, Random House, (1973)
4. Blowback, Random House, (1977)
5. Twospot, (With Collin Wilcox, crossover with Wilcox's Frank Hastings series), Putnam, (1978)
6. Labyrinth, St. Martin's, (1980)
7. Hoodwink, St. Martin's, (1981)
8. Scattershot, St. Martin's, (1982)
9. Dragonfire, St. Martin's, (1982)
10. Bindlestiff, St. Martin's, (1983)
11. Quicksilver, St. Martin's, (1984)
12. Nightshades, St. Martin's, (1984)
13. Double (With Marcia Muller, crossover with Muller's Sharon McCone series), St. Martin's, (1984)
14. Bones, St. Martin's, (1985)
15. Deadfall, St. Martin's, (1986)
16. Shackles, St. Martin's, (1988)
17. Jackpot, Delacorte, (1990)
18. Breakdown, Delacorte, (1991)
19. Quarry, Delacorte, (1992)
20. Epitaphs, Delacorte, (1992)
21. Demons, Delacorte, (1993)
22. Hardcase, Delacorte, (1995)
23. Sentinels, Carroll & Graf, (1996)
24. Illusions, Carroll & Graf, (1997)
25. Boobytrap, Carroll & Graf, (1998)
26. Crazybone, Carroll & Graf, (2000)
27. Bleeders, Carroll & Graf, (2002)
28. Spook, Carroll & Graf, (2003)
29. Nightcrawlers, Forge Books, (2005)
30. Mourners, Forge Books, (2006)
31. Savages, Forge Books, (2007)
32. Fever, Forge Books, (2008)
33. Schemers, Forge Books, (2009)
34. Betrayers, Forge Books, (2010)
35. Camouflage, Forge Books, (2011)
36. Hellbox, Forge Books, (2012)
37. Nemesis, Forge Books, 2013
38. Strangers, Forge Books, 2014
39. Vixen, Forge Books, 2015
40. Endgame, Forge Books, 2017

=== Novellas and short stories ===
1. Booktaker, (novella), Reader’s Digest, 1982
2. Case File (short stories), St. Martin's, (1983)
3. Spadework (short stories), Crippen & Landru, (1996)
4. Scenarios (short stories), Forge Books, (2005)
5. Kinsmen, (novella), Cemetery Dance Publications, (2012)
6. Femme, (novella), Cemetery Dance Publications, (2012)
7. ZigZag, (collection), Forge Books, 2016
