= S. J. Rozan =

American crime fiction writer (born 1950)

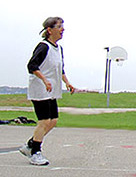
- Rozan playing in annual basketball game at '06 Bouchercon.)
- Born: 1950 (age 75–76); New York City, U.S.
- Education: Oberlin College (BA); University at Buffalo (MArch)
- Occupation: Writer
- Writing career
- Pen name: Sam Cabot
- Period: 1990 to Present
- Genres: Detective fiction, thrillers
- Notable works: Absent Friends; Winter and Night
- Notable awards: Anthony (1998); Dilys (2012); Edgar (2002, 2003); Edward D. Hoch Memorial Golden Derringer (2022); Macavity (2003); Maltese Falcon-Japan (2009); Nero (2003); Shamus (1996, 2002)
- Website: www.sjrozan.net

S. J. Rozan (born 1950) is an American architect and writer of detective fiction and thrillers, based in New York City. She also co-writes a paranormal thriller series under the pseudonym Sam Cabot with Carlos Dews.

== Life ==
S.J. (Shira Judith) Rozan was born in 1950 in the Bronx, New York. She grew up with two sisters and a brother, and has a passion for basketball. She graduated from Oberlin College with a bachelor's degree, and received a master's in architecture from the State University of New York at Buffalo. She is a lifelong New Yorker and currently lives in Lower Manhattan.

Before her career as an architect, Rozan also worked as a janitor, in jewelry sales, painting houses, book sales, bread baking, as an advertising copywriter, and as a self-defense instructor. As an architect, she became project manager for a New York firm working on socially useful projects. She said, "That life was exactly what I wanted, but it wasn't making me happy.... So I decided to go back to this idea I'd had of writing a crime novel."

Rozan's books are set in New York City or start out there. Her P.I. series features Lydia Chin and Bill Smith, and the books alternate point of view between the two characters. About them she has revealed, "Lydia is me as I was when I was her age. She’s optimistic and full of energy. She believes that the world can be saved.... Bill, on the other hand, is me as I am now—on a bad day. He’s been through enough bad stuff in his life that he knows what can’t be done."

In 2013 she co-authored a book with Carlos Dews under the name Sam Cabot. This book was set in Rome and is the first in a series of historical thrillers. In addition to crime novels, since 2004, Rozan has written haiku that she posts each weekend to her blog. They are composed as she makes observations, but aren't written down until she gets home.

Rozan speaks, lectures, and teaches widely, including in January 2003 as an invited speaker at the annual meeting of the World Economic Forum in Davos, Switzerland; as a Master Artist at the Atlantic Center for the Arts in Fall 2006; at the 2009 National Book Festival; speaking about "Every Story Is a Mystery" at the Central Library in Indianapolis in October 2009; as keynote speaker at the California Crime Writers Conference in June 2011; in Fall 2011 as an instructor at the New York Crime Fiction Academy; as a Writer-in-Residence at Singapore Management University in February 2014; as Author-in-Residence & Guest Instructor at 2014 Novel-In-Progress Bookcamp; and during summers in Assisi, Italy at Art Workshop International as a Writing Instructor. She gives freely of her time to other writers as shown by acknowledgments in, among others, the following referenced books:

== Awards and honors ==
In 2016, Rozan received the Lifetime Achievement Award from the Private Eye Writers of America.

Awards for Rozan's writing
| Year | Title | Award | Result | Ref. |
|---|---|---|---|---|
| 1996 | Concourse | Shamus Award for Best P. I. Hardcover Novel | Winner | |
| 1997 | "Hoops" in Ellery Queen Mystery Magazine | Edgar Allan Poe Award for Best Short Story | Finalist | |
| 1998 | No Colder Place | Anthony Award for Best Novel | Winner | |
| 1998 | No Colder Place | Barry Award for Best Novel | Finalist | |
| 1998 | No Colder Place | Shamus Award for Best Novel | Finalist | |
| 2000 | Stone Quarry | Shamus Award for Best Novel | Finalist | |
| 2002 | "Double-Crossing Delancey" in Mystery Street | Anthony Award for Best Short Story | Finalist | |
| 2002 | "Double-Crossing Delancey" in Mystery Street | Edgar Allan Poe Award for Best Short Story | Finalist | |
| 2002 | Reflecting the Sky | Anthony Award for Best Novel | Finalist | |
| 2002 | Reflecting the Sky | Edgar Allan Poe Award for Best Novel | Finalist | |
| 2002 | Reflecting the Sky | Shamus Award for Best P. I. Hardcover Novel | Winner | |
| 2003 | Winter and Night | Anthony Award for Best Novel | Finalist | |
| 2003 | Winter and Night | Barry Award for Best Novel | Finalist | |
| 2003 | Winter and Night | Edgar Allan Poe Award for Best Novel | Winner | |
| 2003 | Winter and Night | Macavity Award for Best Novel | Winner | |
| 2003 | Winter and Night | Nero Award | Winner | |
| 2003 | Winter and Night | Shamus Award for Best Novel | Finalist | |
| 2004 | Absent Friends | Gumshoe Award for Best Novel | Finalist | |
| 2007 | "Building" | Edgar Allan Poe Award for Best Short Story | Finalist | |
| 2008 | "Chapter 4" | Audie Award for Audiobook of the Year | Winner | |
| 2008 | In this Rain | Nero Award | Finalist | |
| 2009 | Winter and Night | Maltese Falcon Award | Winner | |
| 2010 | The Shanghai Moon | Anthony Award for Best Novel | Finalist | |
| 2010 | The Shanghai Moon | Barry Award for Best Novel | Finalist | |
| 2010 | The Shanghai Moon | Dilys Award | Finalist | |
| 2010 | The Shanghai Moon | Macavity Award for Best Mystery Novel | Finalist | |
| 2012 | Ghost Hero | Dilys Award | Winner | |
| 2018 | "Chin Yong-Yun Stays at Home" | Edgar Allan Poe Award for Best Short Story | Finalist | |
| 2022 | Family Business | Shamus Award for Best P. I. Hardcover Novel | Winner | |
| 2022 | Family Business | G. P. Putnam's Sons Sue Grafton Memorial Award | Finalist | |
| 2023 | Paper Son | Maltese Falcon Award | Winner | |

== Publications ==
=== Lydia Chin / Bill Smith series ===
- China Trade ·chin· (1994), St. Martin's. ISBN 0-312-11254-8
- Concourse ·smith· (1995), St. Martin's. ISBN 0-312-13453-3
- Mandarin Plaid ·chin· (1996), St. Martin's. ISBN 0-312-14674-4
- No Colder Place ·smith· (1997), St. Martin's. ISBN 0-312-16811-X
- A Bitter Feast ·chin· (1998), St. Martin's. ISBN 0-312-19259-2
- Stone Quarry ·smith· (1999), St. Martin's. ISBN 0-312-20912-6
- Reflecting the Sky ·chin· (2001), St. Martin's. ISBN 0-312-24427-4
- Winter and Night ·smith· (2002), St. Martin's. ISBN 0-312-24555-6
- The Shanghai Moon ·chin· (2009), St. Martin's. ISBN 978-0-312-24556-6
- On the Line ·smith· (2010), St. Martin's. ISBN 978-0-312-54449-2
- Ghost Hero ·chin· (2011), St. Martin's. ISBN 978-0-312-54450-8
- Paper Son ·chin· (2019), Pegasus Crime. ISBN 978-1-643-13129-0
- The Art of Violence ·smith· (2020). Pegasus Crime. ISBN 978-1-643-13531-1
- Family Business ·chin· (2021). Pegasus Crime. ISBN 978-1-643-13829-9
- The Mayors of New York ·smith· (2023). Pegasus Crime. ISBN 978-1-639-36525-8

=== Standalone novels/chapters ===
- Absent Friends (2004). Delacorte Press. ISBN 0-385-33803-1
- In This Rain (2006), Delacorte Press. ISBN 978-0-385-33804-2
- "Chapter 4", The Chopin Manuscript: A Serial Thriller, idea by Jeffery Deaver, audiobook: ITW & Audible.com (chapters originally delivered serially: Sept 25–Nov 13, 2007)
  also in: Center Point Publishing Large Print (2010), pp. 69–77. ISBN 978-1-60285-676-9
  and in: Part I, Watchlist: A Serial Thriller, Vanguard Press (2010). ISBN 978-1593155599
- "Chapter 13", Inherit the Dead: A Novel (serial) (2013), intro. Lee Child, Touchstone, pp. 171–180. ISBN 978-1-4516-8475-9

=== Writing as Sam Cabot ===
- Blood of the Lamb: A Novel of Secrets (2013), Blue Rider. ISBN 978-0-399-16295-4
- Skin of the Wolf: A Novel (2014), Blue Rider. ISBN 978-0-399-16296-1

Sam Cabot books are co-written with Carlos Dews

=== Short story collections ===
- A Tale About a Tiger and Other Mysterious Events (2009), Crippen & Landru. ISBN 978-1-932009-89-7. A volume of nine previously published short stories:
  "Film at Eleven" · "Hoops" · "Seeing the Moon" · "Passline" · "Night Court" · "Subway" · "A Tale About a Tiger" · "Childhood" · "Double-Crossing Delancey"
- Building and Other Stories (2011). An e-book collection of seven previously published short stories:
  "Building" · "Night Court" · "Going Home" · "Silverfish" · "Seeing the Moon" · "I Seen That" · "Sunset"

=== Short stories ===
In 2022, Rozan was recognized with the Edward D. Hoch Memorial Golden Derringer for Lifetime Achievement by the Short Mystery Fiction Society.

- "Heartbreak" ·smith· (e-book single available)
  P.I. Magazine, Winter 1990, Vol.3 No.1, pp. 16–21.
- "Once Burned" ·smith; chin·
  P.I. Magazine, Winter 1991, Vol.4 No.1, pp. 18–26.
  also in: Lethal Ladies (1996), ed. Barbara Collins & Robert J. Randisi
- "Prosperity Restaurant" ·chin· (e-book single available)
  The Fourth Woman Sleuth Anthology (1991), ed. Irene Zahava, pp. 111–135. ISBN 0-89594-521-5
  also in: Lethal Ladies II (1998), ed. Christine Matthews & Robert J. Randisi
- "Hot Numbers" ·smith·
  P.I. Magazine, Spring 1992, Vol.5 No.1, pp. 16–23.
- "Body English" ·chin; smith· (e-book single available)
  Alfred Hitchcock Mystery Magazine, December 1992, Vol.37 No.12, pp. 24–41.
  also in: Alfred Hitchcock’s Mystery Magazine Presents Fifty Years of Crime and Suspense (2006), ed. Linda Landrigan
  and in: Women of Mystery II (1994), ed. Cynthia Manson
- "Film at Eleven" ·chin·
  Deadly Allies II (1994), ed. Robert J. Randisi & Susan Dunlap, pp. 202–229. ISBN 0-385-42468-X
  also in: A Tale About a Tiger and Other Mysterious Events (collected stories)
- "Birds of Paradise" ·smith· (e-book single available)
  Alfred Hitchcock Mystery Magazine, December 1994, Vol.39 No.13, pp. 142–154.
  also in: Wild Crimes (2004), ed. Dana Stabenow
- "Hoops" ·smith·
  Ellery Queen Mystery Magazine, January 1996, Vol.107 No.1, pp. 40–68.
  also in: The Year’s 25 Finest Crime & Mystery Stories; Sixth Annual Ed (1997), ed. Joan Hess, Ed Gorman & Martin H. Greenberg
  and in: The Best American Mystery Stories 1997, ed. Robert B. Parker & Otto Penzler
  and in: Crime After Crime (1999), ed. Joan Hess, Martin H. Greenberg & Ed Gorman
  and in: Crème de La Crime (2000), ed. Janet Hutchings
  and in: A Tale About a Tiger and Other Mysterious Events (collected stories)
- "Subway" ·chin·
  Vengeance Is Hers (1997), ed. Mickey Spillane & Max Allan Collins, pp. 225–252. ISBN 0-451-19198-6
  also in: A Tale About a Tiger and Other Mysterious Events (collected stories)
- "A Tale about a Tiger" ·chin; smith· (e-book single available)
  Sounds Like Murder, Vol VI (1999), ed. Otto Penzler. (audio cassette) ISBN 0375402063
  also in: Criminal Records (2000), ed. Otto Penzler
  and in: A Tale About a Tiger and Other Mysterious Events (collected stories)
- "Cooking the Hounds" (e-book single available)
  Canine Crimes (1998), presented by Jeffrey Marks, pp. 145–154. ISBN 0-345-42411-5
- "Hunting for Doyle" (e-book single available)
  Ellery Queen Mystery Magazine, May 1999, Vol.113 No.5, pp. 58–63.
- "Childhood" ·smith·
  Compulsion, e-book; Mightywords.com, (Sept 2000).
  also in: The World’s Finest Mystery & Crime Stories; Second Annual Collection (2001), ed. Ed Gorman
- "Marking the Boat" ·chin·
  The Shamus Game (The Private Eye Writers of America Presents) (2000), ed. Robert J. Randisi, pp. 1–38. ISBN 0-451-20129-9
- "The Grift of the Magi"
  commissioned by Otto Penzler, who gifted his bookshop clients. LCCN 2001281539
  also in: Christmas at the Mysterious Bookshop (2010), ed. Otto Penzler
- "Motormouth"
  Ellery Queen Mystery Magazine, April 2001, Vol.117 No.4, pp. 60–61.
- "Double-Crossing Delancey" ·chin· (e-book single available)
  Mystery Street (The Private Eye Writers of America Presents) (2001), ed. Robert J. Randisi, pp. 278–310. ISBN 0-451-20436-0
  also in: The World’s Finest Mystery and Crime Stories; Third Annual Collection (2002) ed. Ed Gorman & Martin H. Greenberg
  and in: A Tale About a Tiger and Other Mysterious Events (collected stories)
- "Going Home"
  The Mysterious North (2002), ed. Dana Stabenow, pp. 169–175. ISBN 0-451-20742-4
  also in: The Longman Anthology of Detective Fiction (2004), ed. Deane Mansfield-Kelley & Lois A. Marchino
  and Death by Pen: The Longman Anthology of Detective Fiction from Poe to Paretsky (2007), ed. Mansfield-Kelley & Marchino
  and in: Building and Other Stories (collection of stories)
- "The Last Kiss"
  Dangerous Women (2005), ed. Otto Penzler, pp. 281–290. ISBN 0-89296-004-3
- "Passline"
  Murder in Vegas: New Crime Tales of Gambling and Desperation (2005), ed. Michael Connelly, pp. 19–30. ISBN 0-765-30739-1
  also in: A Tale About a Tiger and Other Mysterious Events (collected stories)
- "Shots" ·smith·
  Murder at the Foul Line: Original Tales of Hoop Dreams and Deaths from Today’s Great Writers (2006), ed. Otto Penzler, pp. 264–306. ISBN 0-89296-016-7
- "Building"
  Manhattan Noir (2006), ed. Lawrence Block, pp. 196–212. ISBN 1-888451-95-5
  also in: Building and Other Stories (collection of stories)
  and in: New York City Noir: The Five Borough Collection (2012)
- "The Next Nice Day"
  Deadly Housewives (2006), ed. Christine Matthews, pp. 199–205, plus Afterword. ISBN 0-06-085327-1
- "Sunset"
  Hardboiled Brooklyn (2006), ed. Reed Farrel Coleman, pp. 85–96. ISBN 1-932557-17-2
  also in: Building and Other Stories (collection of stories)
- "Hothouse"
  Bronx Noir (2007), edited SJR, pp. 177–190. ISBN 978-1-933354-25-5
  also in: The Best American Mystery Stories 2008, ed. George Pelecanos & Otto Penzler
  and in: New York City Noir: The Five Borough Collection (2012)
- "Undocumented"
  A Hell of a Woman: An Anthology of Female Noir (2007), ed. Megan Abbott, pp. 288–298. ISBN 978-0-9792709-9-4
- "Seeing the Moon" (jack lee) (e-book single available)
  On a Raven’s Wing: New Tales in Honor of Edgar Allan Poe (2009), ed. Stuart M. Kaminsky, pp. 303–327. ISBN 978-0-06-169042-6
  also in: A Tale About a Tiger and Other Mysterious Events (collected stories)
  and in: By Hook or By Crook and 27 More of the Best Crime + Mystery Stories of the Year (2010), ed. Ed Gorman & Martin H. Greenberg
  and in: Building and Other Stories (collection of stories)
- "Silverfish"
  Ellery Queen Mystery Magazine, March/April 2009, Vol.133 Nos.3&4, pp. 76–83.
  also in: Building and Other Stories (collection of stories)
  and in: The Crooked Road, Vol. 2 (2013), ed. Janet Hutchings
- "Night Court"
  MWA Presents The Prosecution Rests: New Stories about Courtrooms, Criminals, and the Law (2009), ed. Linda Fairstein, pp. 326–332. ISBN 978-0-316-01252-2
  also in: A Tale About a Tiger and Other Mysterious Events (collected stories)
  and in: Building and Other Stories (collection of stories)
- "Cold, Hard Facts"
  Two of the Deadliest: New Tales of Lust, Greed, and Murder (2009), ed. Elizabeth George, pp. 313–325. ISBN 978-0-06-135033-7
- "I Seen That"
  Once Upon a Crime: An Anthology of Murder, Mayhem and Suspense (2009), ed. Gary R. Bush & Chris Everheart, pp. 243–245. ISBN 978-1-932472-85-1
  also in: Building and Other Stories (collection of stories)
- "Daybreak"
  The Dark End of the Street: New Stories of Sex and Crime (2010), co-edited with Jonathan Santlofer, pp. 247–257. ISBN 978-1-59691-683-8
- "Chin Yong-Yun Takes a Case" (ma chin) (e-book single available)
  Damn Near Dead 2 (2010), ed. Bill Crider, pp. 229–240. ISBN 978-1-935415-40-4
  also in: The Best American Mystery Stories 2011, ed. Harlan Coben & Otto Penzler
- "Iterations"
  MWA Presents The Rich and the Dead (2011), ed. Nelson DeMille, pp. 295–308. ISBN 978-0-446-55587-6
- "The Path"
  Home Improvement: Undead Edition - All-new tales of hauned home repair and surreal estates (2011), ed. Charlaine Harris & Toni L.P. Kelner, pp. 211–236. ISBN 978-0-441-02035-5
- "The Men with the Twisted Lips"
  A Study in Sherlock: Stories Inspired by the Holmes Canon (2011), ed. Laurie R. King & Leslie S. Klinger, pp. 44–59. ISBN 978-0-8129-8246-6
- "New Day Newark"
  New Jersey Noir (2011), ed. Joyce Carol Oates, pp. 61–75. ISBN 978-1-61775-034-2
- "Occupy This!"
  Scoundrels: Tales of Greed, Murder and Financial Crimes (2012), ed. Gary Phillips, pp. 85–94. ISBN 978-1-937495-22-0
- "Hero"
  The Green Hornet: Still At Large! (2012), ed. Joe Gentile, Win Scott Eckert & Matthew Baugh, pp. 1–13. ISBN 978-1-936814-30-5
- "Lighthouse"
  Staten Island Noir (2012), ed. Patricia Smith, pp. 233–252. ISBN 978-1-61775-129-5
  also in: New York City Noir: The Five Borough Collection (2012)
  and in: USA Noir: The Best of the Akashic Noir Series (2013), ed. Johnny Temple
- "Golden Chance"
  Ellery Queen Mystery Magazine, December 2012, Vol.140 No.6, pp. 2–17.
  also in: EQMM's Fiction Podcasts, Episode 44 (49:34), posted April 1, 2013, read by author
- "Escape Velocity"
  Ride 2: More short fiction about bicycles (2012), ed. Keith Snyder, pp. 1–13. ISBN 978-0-9835515-5-3
- "Falconer"
  Mondays Are Murder. Akashic Books website, May 6, 2013.
- "Kena Sai"
  Singapore Noir (2014), ed. Cheryl Lu-Lien Tan, pp. 109–122. ISBN 978-1-617752-35-3
- "Wet Dog on a Rainy Day"
  Dark City Lights: New York Stories (2015), ed. Lawrence Block, pp. 324–328. ISBN 978-1-941110-21-8
- "Chin Yong-Yun Makes a Shiddach" (ma chin)
  Manhattan Mayhem: New Crime Stories from Mystery Writers of America (2015), ed. Mary Higgins Clark, pp. 281–294. ISBN 978-1-59474-761-8
- "Chin Yong-Yun Helps a Fool" (ma chin)
  Ellery Queen Mystery Magazine, September/October 2018, Vol.152 No.3&4, pp. 2–18.
  won: 2019 Shamus Award, Best Short Story

=== Poetry ===
- 211 Haiku (September 2012) - An e-book collection of 211 selected works, from 2004–2011, that follows a calendar year cycle

=== Non-fiction essays and articles ===
- "The Private Eye: An American Hero" (2009), Crippen & Landru, 8 p. pamphlet. OCLC 672293661 (Collection of three columns, edited, written for the Private Eye Writers of America)
  From inside back cover: "Two hundred twenty-five copies were printed to accompany the limited edition of A Tale About a Tiger and Other Mysterious Events, and are not for sale separately."
- "Who Is Silverman, What Is She?", In Pursuit of Spenser: Mystery Writers on Robert B. Parker and the Creation of an American Hero (2012), ed. Otto Penzler, Smart Pop, pp. 163–172. ISBN 978-1-935618-57-7
- "Part 2: Tips and Tales: Categorisation and its discontents", The Arvon Book of Crime and Thriller Writing (2012), eds. Michelle Spring & Laurie R. King, Bloomsbury Publishing, pp. 150–153. ISBN 978-1-4081-3122-0
- "True confessions by John Gregory Dunne (1977)", Books to Die For (2012), eds. John Connolly & Declan Burke, Hodder & Stoughton, pp. 421–426. ISBN 978-1-444-75650-0
