= Marcia Muller =

American novelist

- Born: September 28, 1944 (age 81); Detroit, Michigan, U.S.
- Education: University of Michigan
- Occupation: Writer
- Spouse: Bill Pronzini
- Writing career
- Genre: Thriller/mystery
- Website: www.marciamullerbooks.com

Marcia Muller (born September 28, 1944) is an American author of mystery and thriller novels.

Muller has written many novels featuring her Sharon McCone female private detective character. Vanishing Point won the Shamus Award for Best P.I. Novel. Muller had been nominated for the Shamus Award four times previously.

In 2005, Muller was awarded the Mystery Writers of America's Grand Master award.

She was born in Detroit, Michigan, and grew up in Birmingham, Michigan, and graduated in English from the University of Michigan and worked as a journalist at Sunset magazine. She is married to detective fiction author Bill Pronzini with whom she has collaborated on several novels.

== Awards ==
In 1993, Muller was honored with the Lifetime Achievement Award from the Private Eye Writers of America (PWA). In 2010, Muller's character Sharon McCone won the PWA's Hammer Prize.

Awards for Muller's writing
Year	Title	Award	Result	Ref.
1987	1001 Midnights	Macavity Award for Best Mystery Nonfiction/Critical Book	Winner	
1990	"Deadly Fantasies" in Alfred Hitchcock's Mystery Magazine	Shamus Award for Best Short Story	Finalist	
1990	The Shape of Dread	Shamus Award for Best Novel	Finalist	
1991	"Final Resting Place" in Justice for Hire	Shamus Award for Best Short Story	Finalist	
1992	Where Echoes Live	Shamus Award for Best Novel	Finalist	
1994	Wolf in the Shadows	Anthony Award for Best Novel	Winner	
1994	Wolf in the Shadows	Dilys Award	Finalist	
1994	Wolf in the Shadows	Edgar Allan Poe Award for Best Novel	Finalist	
1994	Wolf in the Shadows	Shamus Award for Best Novel	Finalist	
1996	A Wild and Lonely Place	Macavity Award for Best Novel	Finalist	
2001	Listen to the Silence	Anthony Award for Best Novel	Finalist	
2001	Listen to the Silence	Shamus Award for Best Novel	Finalist	
2007	Vanishing Point	Shamus Award for Best Novel	Finalist	
2010	Locked In	Barry Award for Best Novel	Finalist	
2010	Locked In	Shamus Award for Best Novel	Winner	

== Published works ==
=== Novels ===
- The Rockspur Eleven (1978) – a YA novel
- The Arborgate (1980) – a supernatural suspense novel
- Muller, Marcia & Bill Pronzini (1987). The lighthouse.

Sharon McCone series

1. Edwin of the Iron Shoes (October, 1977)
2. Ask the Cards A Question (May, 1982)
3. The Cheshire Cat's Eye (January, 1983)
4. Games to Keep the Dark Away (1984)
5. Leave A Message for Willie (September, 1984)
6. Double (October, 1984) (co-written with her husband, Bill Pronzini, also a crossover with Pronzini's Nameless Detective series)
7. There's Nothing to Be Afraid of (August, 1985)
8. Eye of the Storm (March, 1988)
9. There's Something in A Sunday (January, 1989)
10. The Shape of Dread (November, 1989)
11. Trophies and Dead Things (September, 1990)
12. Where Echoes Live (July, 1991)
13. Pennies on A Dead Woman's Eyes (July, 1992)
14. Wolf in the Shadows (July, 1993)
15. Till the Butchers Cut Him Down (July, 1994)
16. A Wild and Lonely Place (August, 1995)
17. The Broken Promise Land (June, 1996)
18. Both Ends of the Night (July, 1997)
19. While Other People Sleep (July, 1998)
20. A Walk Through the Fire (May, 1999)
21. Listen to the Silence (July, 2000)
22. Dead Midnight (July, 2002)
23. The Dangerous Hour (July, 2004)
24. Vanishing Point (July, 2006)
25. The Ever-Running Man (July, 2007)
26. Burn Out (October, 2008)
27. Locked In (October, 2009)
28. Coming Back (October, 2010)
29. City of Whispers (October, 2011)
30. Looking For Yesterday (November, 2012)
31. The Night Searchers (July, 2014)
32. Someone Always Knows (July, 2016)
33. The Color of Fear (August, 2017)
34. The Breakers (August, 2018)
35. Ice and Stone (August, 2021)
36. Circle in the Water (April, 2024)

Carpenter and Quincannon Mysteries

1. The Bughouse Affair (2013) (co-written with Bill Pronzini)
2. The Spook Lights Affair (2013) (co-written with Bill Pronzini)
3. The Body Snatchers Affair (2015) (co-written with Bill Pronzini)
4. The Plagues of Thieves Affair (2016) (co-written with Bill Pronzini)
5. Dangerous Ladies Affair (2017) (co-written with Bill Pronzini)
6. The Bags of Tricks Affair (2018) (Pronzini & Muller).
7. Quarry (Pronzini & Muller, 2019)

Elena Oliverez series

1. The Tree of Death (1983)
2. The Legend of the Slain Soldiers (1985)
3. Beyond the Grave (1986) (co-written with Bill Pronzini)

Joanna Stark series

1. The Cavalier in White (1986)
2. There Hangs the Knife (1988)
3. Dark Star (1989)

Soledad County series

1. Point Deception (2001)
2. Cyanide Wells (2003)
3. Cape Perdido (2005)

=== Anthologies and collections ===
- The Web She Weaves (1983) (co-written with Bill Pronzini)
- Witches Brew: Horror and Supernatural Stories by Women (1984) (co-written with Bill Pronzini)
- Child's Ploy: An Anthology of Mystery and Suspense Stories (1984) (co-written with Bill Pronzini)
- She Won the West: An Anthology of Western and Frontier Stories by Women (1985) (co-written with Bill Pronzini)
- Dark Lessons: Crime and Detection on Campus (1985) (co-written with Bill Pronzini)
- Kill or Cure: Suspense Stories About the World of Medicine (1985) (co-written with Bill Pronzini)
- The Deadly Arts: A Collection of Artful Suspense (1985) (co-written with Bill Pronzini)
- Chapter and Hearse: Suspense Stories About the World of Books (1985) (co-written with Bill Pronzini)
- The Wickedest Show on Earth: A Carnival of Circus Suspense (1985) (co-written with Bill Pronzini)
- Partners in Crime (1986, with Bill Pronzini)
- Lady on the Case: 21 Stories and 1 Complete Novel Starring the World's Great Female Sleuths (1988) (co-written with Bill Pronzini and Martin H. Greenberg)
- Women’s Eye, Woman’s Hand (1990, co-editor)
- Deceptions (1991) (short story collection)
- Grand Sleuths (1992, with Bill Pronzini)
- The McCone Files (Crippen & Landru,1994) (short story collection)
- Detective Duos: The Best Adventures of Twenty-Five Crime-Solving Twosomes (1997) (co-written with Bill Pronzini)
- Duo (1998) (short story collection) (co-written with Bill Pronzini)
- McCone and Friends (Crippen & Landru, 1999) (short story collection)
- Time of the Wolves (2003) (Western short story collection)
- Somewhere in the City (2007) (short story collection)
- Crucifixion River (2007) (short story collection) (co-written with Bill Pronzini)

=== Non-fiction ===
- 1001 Midnights: The Aficionado's Guide to Mystery and Detective Fiction (1986) (co-written with Bill Pronzini)
