= Bill Pronzini =

American writer of detective fiction, and anthologist

- Born: April 13, 1943 (age 83); Petaluma, California
- Occupation: Novelist
- Spouse: Marcia Muller
- Writing career
- Pen name: William Hart Davis, Jack Foxx, William Jeffrey & Alex Saxon
- Language: English
- Genres: Mystery, science fiction, horror
- Notable work: Nameless Detective series

Bill Pronzini (born April 13, 1943) is an American writer of detective fiction. He is also an active anthologist, having compiled more than 100 collections, most of which focus on mystery, western, and science fiction short stories. Pronzini is known as the creator of the San Francisco-based Nameless Detective, who starred in over 40 books from the early 1970s into the 2000s.

== Career ==
William John Pronzini was born in Petaluma, California on 13 April 1943.

He published his first novel, The Stalker, in 1971. However, his best known works are the Nameless Detective series, which he began in 1971. As of 2017, there are 46 books in the series, including a number of short stories. While the stories involve the usual range of crimes typical to mysteries, they depict relatively little violence.

Otto Penzler, of The Mysterious Bookshop in New York City, has published a vodcast review of Bill Pronzini's work and career.

=== Short stories ===
Pronzini has written and published more than three hundred short stories. They have been published in a variety of markets, including some of the last issues of both Adventure and Argosy magazines, generally considered the first American pulp magazines. Pronzini's work has also appeared in Charlie Chan Mystery Magazine, Ellery Queen's Mystery Magazine, Man from U.N.C.L.E. Magazine, The Magazine of Fantasy and Science Fiction, Mike Shayne Mystery Magazine, and Alfred Hitchcock's Anthology.

His short story collection Carpenter and Quincannon, Professional Detective Services (1998) is based in the 1890s and centers on Sabina Carpenter, a Pinkerton detective widow who is working in her late husband's profession.

=== Awards ===
Pronzini has received numerous awards and award nominations for achievement in the mystery genre. His debut novel The Stalker was nominated for the 1972 Edgar Award in the "Best First Mystery Novel" category. Pronzini won the inaugural Shamus Award for "Best Private Eye Novel" in 1982 for his novel Hoodwink. The following year, he was nominated for his second Edgar Award, this time in the "Best Critical or Biographical" listings for Gun in Cheek. The next year, 1984, Pronzini won his first award for a short-story, winning the "Best Private Eye Short Story" Shamus Award for "Cat's Paw". His novel Bones was nominated for the "Best Private Eye Novel" Shamus in 1986. In 1987, Pronzini was awarded "The Eye", the Shamus award for "Lifetime Achievement" in the mystery genre, the highest accolade awarded. The same year, Pronzini received his first Macavity Award for his Critical Work 1001 Midnights, along with Marcia Muller. The next year he won in the same category for Son of Gun in Cheek.

1989 brought a nomination at the 1989 Anthony Awards for "Best Novel", for Shackles; and another Shamus nomination for short-story "Incident in a Neighborhood Tavern". That same year, his novel Snowbound was awarded the French Grand Prix de Littérature Policière. Another two short-story nominations at the Shamus Awards followed for "Here Comes Santa Claus" in 1990 and "Home is the Place Where" in 1996. That year his novel Blue Lonesome was nominated for the "Best Novel" 1996 Anthony Award. The next year, Sentinels received a "Best Novel" nomination at the 1997 Shamus Awards; the year after A Wasteland of Strangers won Pronzini's only "Best Novel" Edgar Award. Boobytrap won the Shamus Award in the same category in 1999. "The Big Bite" in 2001 and "Devil's Brew" in 2007 were both Shamus Award "Best Private Eye Short Story" nominees. In 2010 he was nominated for "Best Novel" for his Schemers. In 2006 he was a finalist for the Hammett Prize for The Crimes of Jordan Wise.

== Personal life ==
Pronzini has been married three times. His first marriage was to Laura Patricia Adolphson (1965, divorced 1966); the second was to Brunhilde Schier (July 28, 1972, separated December 1985, divorced a couple of years later).

He married mystery writer Marcia Muller in 1992. They have collaborated on several novels: Double (1984), a Nameless Detective novel, The Lighthouse (1987), Beyond the Grave (1986), several books in the Carpenter and Quincannon mystery series, and numerous anthologies.
