= Edgar Allan Poe Award for Best First Novel =

Annual literary award

The Edgar Allan Poe Award for Best First Novel was established in 1946.

Only debut novels written by authors with United States citizenship are eligible and may be published in hardcover, paperback, or e-book. If an American author has published a novel of any genre or under any name previously, they are ineligible for the award, unless the novel was self-published. Authors ineligible for the Edgar Allan Poe Award for Best First Novel may be eligible for the Edgar Allan Poe Award for Best Novel or the Edgar Allan Poe Award for Best Paperback Original.

Winners for the Edgar Allan Poe Award for Best First Novel are listed below.

== Recipients ==
=== 1940s ===
1940s Best First Novel winners
Year	Author	Title	Result	Ref.
1946	Julius Fast	Watchful at Night	Winner	
1947	Helen Eustis	The Horizontal Man	Winner	
1948	Fredric Brown	The Fabulous Clipjoint	Winner	
1949	Mildred B. Davis	The Room Upstairs	Winner	
1949	Herbert Brean	Wilders Walk Away	Finalist	
1949	Richard Ellington	Shoot the Works	Finalist	

=== 1950s ===
1950s Best First Novel winners
Year	Author	Title	Result	Ref.
1950	Alan Green	What A Body	Winner	
1950	Geoffrey Holiday Hall	The End Is Known	Finalist	
1950	William Krasner	Walk the Dark Streets	Finalist	
1950	G. G. Lobell and N. D. Lobell	The Shadow and the Blot	Finalist	
1950	Evelyn Piper	The Innocent	Finalist	
1950	Bart Spicer	The Dark Light	Finalist	
1951	Thomas Walsh	Nightmare in Manhattan	Winner	
1951	Patricia Highsmith	Strangers on a Train	Finalist	
1951	Thaddeus O'Finn	Happy Holiday!	Finalist	
1951	Thomas Sterling	The House Without a Door	Finalist	
1952	Mary McMullen	Strangle Hold	Winner	
1952	Lee Herrington	Carry My Coffin Slowly	Finalist	
1952	David William Meredith	The Christmas Card Murders	Finalist	
1952	Thurston Scott	Cure It with Honey (I’ll Get Mine)	Finalist	
1952	Robert B. Sinclair	The Eleventh Hour	Finalist	
1953	William Campbell Gault	Don't Cry for Me	Winner	
1953	Peggy Bacon	The Inward Eye	Finalist	
1954	Ira Levin	A Kiss Before Dying	Winner	
1955	Jean Potts	Go, Lovely Rose	Winner	
1956	Lane Kauffman	The Perfectionist	Winner	
1956	Harold R. Daniels	In His Blood	Finalist	
1956	Fred Levon	Much Ado About Murder	Finalist	
1957	Donald McNutt Douglass	Rebecca's Pride	Winner	
1958	William Rawle Weeks	Knock and Wait a While	Winner	
1958	Warren Carrier	Bay of the Damned	Finalist	
1958	James Cross	Root of Evil	Finalist	
1959	Richard Martin Stern	The Bright Road to Fear	Winner	
1959	Edgar Bohle	The Man Who Disappeared	Finalist	
1959	Frances Duncombe	Death of a Spinster	Finalist	
1959	Harry Olesker	Now Will You Try for Murder?	Finalist	

=== 1960s ===
1960s Best First Novel winners
Year	Author	Title	Result	Ref.
1960	Henry Slesar	The Grey Flannel Shroud	Winner	
1960	Mary O. Rank	A Dream of Falling	Finalist	
1961	John Holbrooke Vance	The Man in the Cage	Winner	
1961	William Johnston	The Marriage Cage	Finalist	
1961	David McCarthy	The Killing at Big Tree	Finalist	
1961	Dell Shannon	Case Pending	Finalist	
1961	Donald E. Westlake	The Mercenaries	Finalist	
1962	Suzanne Blanc	The Green Stone	Winner	
1962	Malcolm Braly	Felony Tank	Finalist	
1962	Olivia Dwight	Close His Eyes	Finalist	
1962	Alex Gordon	The Cipher	Finalist	
1962	Brèni James	Night of the Kill	Finalist	
1962	Winfred Van Atta	Shock Treatment	Finalist	
1963	Robert L. Fish	The Fugitive	Winner	
1963	Daniel Broun	Counterweight	Finalist	
1963	Richard Unekis	The Chase	Finalist	
1964	Cornelius Hirschberg	Florentine Finish	Winner	
1964	M. Fagyas	The Fifth Woman	Finalist	
1964	Frances Rickett	The Prowler	Finalist	
1964	James Michael Ullman	The Neon Haystack	Finalist	
1965	Harry Kemelman	Friday the Rabbi Slept Late	Winner	
1965	Amanda Cross	In the Last Analysis	Finalist	
1965	Rubin Weber	The Grave-Maker’s House	Finalist	
1966	John Ball	In the Heat of the Night	Winner	
1966	Jack D. Hunter	The Expendable Spy	Finalist	
1966	Vincent McConnor	The French Doll	Finalist	
1966	Alexandra Roudybush	Before the Ball Was Over	Finalist	
1967	Ross Thomas	The Cold War Swap	Winner	
1967	Babs Deal	Fancy’s Knell	Finalist	
1967	Robert Elegant	A Kind of Treason	Finalist	
1967	George Lanning	The Pedestal	Finalist	
1968	Michael Collins	Act of Fear	Winner	
1968	James Dawson	Hell Gate	Finalist	
1968	P. E. H. Dunston	Mortissimo	Finalist	
1968	Charles Early	The Tigers Are Hungry	Finalist	
1968	John Redgate	The Killing Season	Finalist	
1969	E. Richard Johnson	Tie: Silver Street	Winner	
1969	Dorothy Uhnak	The Bait	Winner	
1969	Lawrence Kamarck	The Dinosaur	Finalist	

=== 1970s ===
1970s Best First Novel winners
Year	Author	Title	Result	Ref.
1970	Joe Gores	A Time of Predators	Winner	
1970	Naomi Hintze	You’ll Like My Mother	Finalist	
1970	Myrick Land	Quicksand	Finalist	
1971	Lawrence Sanders	The Anderson Tapes	Winner	
1971	J. E. Brown	Incident at 125th Street	Finalist	
1971	Stanley Cohen	Taking Gary Feldman	Finalist	
1971	Tony Hillerman	The Blessing Way	Finalist	
1971	Sidney Sheldon	The Naked Face	Finalist	
1972	A. H. Z. Carr	Finding Maubee	Winner	
1972	Hildegarde Dolson	To Spite Her Face	Finalist	
1972	Michael Lewin	Ask the Right Question	Finalist	
1972	Bill Pronzini	The Stalker	Finalist	
1972	Martin Cruz Smith	Gypsy in Amber	Finalist	
1973	R. H. Shimer	Squaw Point	Winner	
1973	Arthur Goldstein	A Person Shouldn’t Die Like That	Finalist	
1973	William H. Hallahan	The Dead of Winter	Finalist	
1973	Frank Leonard	Box 100	Finalist	
1973	Thomas A. Roberts	The Heart of the Dog	Finalist	
1974	Paul Erdman	The Billion Dollar Sure Thing	Winner	
1974	Clarence Jackson	Kicked to Death by a Camel	Finalist	
1974	Charles Larson	Someone’s Death	Finalist	
1974	Justin Scott	Many Happy Returns	Finalist	
1974	Michael Wolfe	Man on a String	Finalist	
1975	Gregory Mcdonald	Fletch	Winner	
1975	Dominic Koski and Virgil Scott	The Kreutzman Formula	Finalist	
1975	Brown Meggs	Saturday Games	Finalist	
1975	Nicholas Meyer	Target Practice	Finalist	
1975	Vern E. Smith	The Jones Man	Finalist	
1976	Rex Burns	The Alvarez Journal	Winner	
1976	Max Crawford	Waltz Across Texas	Finalist	
1976	Thomas Klop	Harmattan	Finalist	
1976	Lynn Meyer	Paperback Thriller	Finalist	
1976	A. J. Russell	The Devalino Caper	Finalist	
1977	James Patterson	The Thomas Berryman Number	Winner	
1977	Alan Furst	Your Day in the Barrel	Finalist	
1977	Steve Knickmeyer	Straight	Finalist	
1977	Janice Law	The Big Payoff	Finalist	
1977	Marie R. Reno	Final Proof	Finalist	
1978	Robert Ross	A French Finish	Winner	
1978	Charles A. Goodrum	Dewey Decimated	Finalist	
1978	Bob Randall	The Fan	Finalist	
1979	William L. DeAndrea	Killed in the Ratings	Winner	
1979	Thomas L. Dunne	The Scourge	Finalist	
1979	William Hjortsberg	Falling Angel	Finalist	
1979	Craig Jones	Blood Secrets	Finalist	
1979	Donald A. Stanwood	The Memory of Eva Ryker	Finalist	

=== 1980s ===
1980s Best First Novel winners
Year	Author	Title	Result	Ref.
1980	Richard North Patterson	The Lasko Tangent	Winner	
1980	Peter Heath Fine	Night Trains	Finalist	
1980	John Logue	Follow the Leader	Finalist	
1981	K. Nolte Smith	The Watcher	Winner	
1981	Betsy Aswad	Winds of the Old Days	Finalist	
1981	Oliver Banks	The Rembrandt Panel	Finalist	
1981	David Carkeet	Double Negative	Finalist	
1981	Susanne Jaffe	The Other Ann Fletcher	Finalist	
1982	Stuart Woods	Chiefs	Winner	
1982	Tom Hyman	Giant Killer	Finalist	
1982	Ernest Larsen	Not a Through Street	Finalist	
1982	Geoffrey Miller	The Black Glove	Finalist	
1982	Anthony Olcott	Murder at the Red October	Finalist	
1983	Thomas Perry	The Butcher's Boy	Winner	
1983	S. F. X. Dean	By Frequent Anguish	Finalist	
1983	Richard Hughes	Unholy Communion	Finalist	
1983	John Katzenbach	In the Heat of the Summer	Finalist	
1983	Ernest Savage	Two If By Sea	Finalist	
1984	Will Harriss	The Bay Psalm Book Murder	Winner	
1984	Herbert Resnicow	The Gold Solution	Finalist	
1984	Mark Schorr	Red Diamond, Private Eye	Finalist	
1984	Andrew Taylor	Caroline Minuscule	Finalist	
1984	Carolyn Wheat	Dead Man’s Thoughts	Finalist	
1985	R. D. Rosen	Strike Three, You're Dead	Winner	
1985	Jack Early	A Creative Kind of Killer	Finalist	
1985	Doug Hornig	Foul Shot	Finalist	
1985	Orania Papazoglou	Sweet, Savage Death	Finalist	
1985	Alison Smith	Someone Else’s Grave	Finalist	
1986	Jonathan Kellerman	When the Bough Breaks	Winner	
1986	Tony Fennelly	The Glory Hole Murders	Finalist	
1986	Dick Lochte	Sleeping Dog	Finalist	
1986	Daniel Stashower	The Adventure of the Ectoplasmic Man	Finalist	
1987	Larry Beinhart	No One Rides for Free	Winner	
1987	Gary Devon	Lost	Finalist	
1987	Richard Hyer	Riceburner	Finalist	
1987	Joseph Koenig	Floater	Finalist	
1987	Mike Lupica	Dead Air	Finalist	
1988	Deidre S. Laiken	Death Among Strangers	Winner	
1988	Parnell Hall	Detective	Finalist	
1988	John Lantigua	Heat Lightning	Finalist	
1988	Dallas Murphy	Lover Man	Finalist	
1988	Domenic Stansberry	The Spoiler	Finalist	
1989	David Stout	Carolina Skeletons	Winner	
1989	Mary Lou Bennett	Murder Once Done	Finalist	
1989	J. Madison Davis	The Murder of Frau Schutz	Finalist	
1989	Elizabeth George	A Great Deliverance	Finalist	
1989	Shelly Reuben	Julian Solo	Finalist	

=== 1990s ===
1990s Best First Novel winners
Year	Author	Title	Result	Ref.
1990	Susan Wolfe	The Last Billable Hour	Winner	
1990	Barry Berg	Hide and Seek	Finalist	
1990	Susan Taylor Chehak	The Story of Annie D.	Finalist	
1990	Melodie Johnson Howe; Melodie Johnson Howe	The Mother Shadow	Finalist	
1990	Bruce Zimmerman	Blood Under the Bridge	Finalist	
1991	Patricia Cornwell	Postmortem	Winner	
1991	Gary Amo	Come Nightfall	Finalist	
1991	W. Edward Blain	Passion Play	Finalist	
1991	Edna Buchanan	Nobody Lives Forever	Finalist	
1991	Walter Mosley	Devil in a Blue Dress	Finalist	
1992	Peter Blauner	Slow Motion Riot	Winner	
1992	Terence Faherty	Deadstick	Finalist	
1992	Marcy Heidish	Deadline	Finalist	
1992	Mary Willis Walker	Zero at the Bone	Finalist	
1992	Don Winslow	A Cool Breeze on the Underground	Finalist	
1993	Michael Connelly	The Black Echo	Winner	
1993	Christine Andreae	Trail of Murder	Finalist	
1993	Jane Stanton Hitchcock	Trick of the Eye	Finalist	
1993	Craig Smith	Ladystinger	Finalist	
1994	Laurie R. King	A Grave Talent	Winner	
1994	Mark Frost	The List of Seven	Finalist	
1994	Darian North	Criminal Seduction	Finalist	
1994	Manuel Ramos	The Ballad of Rocky Ruiz	Finalist	
1994	David Rosenbaum	Zaddik	Finalist	
1995	George Dawes Green	The Caveman's Valentine	Winner	
1995	Janet Evanovich	One for the Money	Finalist	
1995	Carol O'Connell	Mallory’s Oracle	Finalist	
1995	Barbara Parker	Suspicion of Innocence	Finalist	
1995	Doug J. Swanson	Big Town	Finalist	
1996	David Housewright	Penance	Winner	
1996	Kevin Allman	Tight Shot	Finalist	
1996	Martha C. Lawrence	Murder in Scorpio	Finalist	
1996	Allan Pedrazas	The Harry Chronicles	Finalist	
1996	David J. Walker	Fixed in His Folly	Finalist	
1997	John Morgan Wilson	Simple Justice	Winner	
1997	Margaret Moseley	Bonita Faye	Finalist	
1997	Sharon Kay Penman	The Queen’s Man	Finalist	
1997	Charles Todd	A Test of Wills	Finalist	
1997	Michael C. White	A Brother’s Blood	Finalist	
1998	Joseph Kanon	Los Alamos	Winner	
1998	Suzanne Berne	A Crime in the Neighborhood	Finalist	
1998	Philip Reed	Bird Dog	Finalist	
1998	Lisa See	Flower Net	Finalist	
1998	K. J. A. Wishnia	23 Shades of Black	Finalist	
1999	Steve Hamilton	A Cold Day in Paradise	Winner	
1999	Ira Genberg	Reckless Homicide	Finalist	
1999	Christopher Reich	Numbered Account	Finalist	
1999	Jen Sacks	Nice	Finalist	
1999	D. R. Schanker	A Criminal Appeal	Finalist	

=== 2000s ===
2000s Best First Novel winners
Year	Author	Title	Result	Ref.
2000	Eliot Pattison	The Skull Mantra	Winner	
2000	Arthur W. Bahr	Certifiably Insane	Finalist	
2000	Dave Barry	Big Trouble	Finalist	
2000	Boston Teran	God Is a Bullet	Finalist	
2000	Paula L. Woods	Inner City Blues	Finalist	
2001	David Liss	A Conspiracy of Paper	Winner	
2001	Scott Phillips	The Ice Harvest	Finalist	
2001	Qiu Xiaolong	Death of a Red Heroine	Finalist	
2001	Marcia Simpson	Crow in Stolen Colors	Finalist	
2001	Peter Moore Smith	Raveling	Finalist	
2002	David Ellis	Line of Vision	Winner	
2002	C. J. Box	Open Season	Finalist	
2002	Gabriel Cohen	Red Hook	Finalist	
2002	Victor Gischler	Gun Monkeys	Finalist	
2002	Denise Hamilton	The Jasmine Trade	Finalist	
2003	Jonathon King	The Blue Edge of Midnight	Winner	
2003	Stephen J. Clark	Southern Latitudes	Finalist	
2003	Kam Majd	High Wire	Finalist	
2003	Ben Rehder	Buck Fever	Finalist	
2003	David Rosenfelt	Open and Shut	Finalist	
2004	Rebecca Pawel	Death of a Nationalist	Winner	
2004	Martha Conway	12 Bliss Street	Finalist	
2004	Robert Heilbrun	Offer of Proof	Finalist	
2004	James Hime	The Night of the Dance	Finalist	
2004	Olen Steinhauer	The Bridge of Sighs	Finalist	
2005	Don Lee	Country of Origin	Winner	
2005	Richard Aleas	Little Girl Lost	Finalist	
2005	Charles Benoit	Relative Danger	Finalist	
2005	Liam Callanan	The Cloud Atlas	Finalist	
2005	Michael Koryta	Tonight I Said Goodbye	Finalist	
2005	Bob Morris	Bahamarama	Finalist	
2006	Theresa Schwegel	Officer Down	Winner	
2006	Megan Abbott	Die a Little	Finalist	
2006	Brian Freeman	Immoral	Finalist	
2006	Scott Frost	Run the Risk	Finalist	
2006	Alison Gaylin	Hide Your Eyes	Finalist	
2007	Alex Berenson	The Faithful Spy	Winner	
2007	Gillian Flynn	Sharp Objects	Finalist	
2007	John Hart	King of Lies	Finalist	
2007	Steve Hockensmith	Holmes on the Range	Finalist	
2007	Cornelia Read	A Field of Darkness	Finalist	
2008	Tana French	In the Woods	Winner	
2008	Gordon Campbell	Missing Witness	Finalist	
2008	Christopher Goffard	Snitch Jacket	Finalist	
2008	Craig McDonald	Head Games	Finalist	
2008	Derek Nikitas	Pyres	Finalist	
2009	Francie Lin	The Foreigner	Winner	
2009	Tom Epperson	The Kind One	Finalist	
2009	David Fuller	Sweetsmoke	Finalist	
2009	Charlie Newton	Calumet City	Finalist	
2009	Justin Peacock	A Cure for Night	Finalist	

=== 2010s ===
2010s Best First Novel winners and finalists
Year	Author	Title	Result	Ref.
2010	Stefanie Pintoff	In the Shadow of Gotham	Winner	
2010	David Cristofano	The Girl She Used To Be	Shortlist	
2010	Bryan Gruley	Starvation Lake	Shortlist	
2010	Heather Gudenkauf	The Weight of Silence	Shortlist	
2010	Sophie Littlefield	A Bad Day for Sorry	Shortlist	
2010	Attica Locke	Black Water Rising	Shortlist	
2011	Bruce DeSilva	Rogue Island	Winner	
2011	Paul Doiron	The Poacher’s Son	Shortlist	
2011	David Gordon	The Serialist	Shortlist	
2011	Nic Pizzolatto	Galveston	Shortlist	
2011	James Thompson	Snow Angels	Shortlist	
2012	Lori Roy	Bent Road	Winner	
2012	Edward Conlon	Red on Red	Shortlist	
2012	David Duffy	Last to Fold	Shortlist	
2012	Leonard Rosen	All Cry Chaos	Shortlist	
2012	Steve Ulfelder	Purgatory Chasm	Shortlist	
2013	Chris Pavone	The Expats	Winner	
2013	Kim Fay	The Map of Lost Memories	Shortlist	
2013	Daniel Friedman	Don’t Ever Get Old	Shortlist	
2013	Susan Elia MacNeal	Mr. Churchill’s Secretary	Shortlist	
2013	Matthew Quirk	The 500	Shortlist	
2013	Michael Sears	Black Fridays	Shortlist	
2014	Jason Matthews	Red Sparrow	Winner	
2014	Matthew Guinn	The Resurrectionist	Shortlist	
2014	Roger Hobbs	Ghostman	Shortlist	
2014	Becky Masterman	Rage Against the Dying	Shortlist	
2014	Kimberly McCreight	Reconstructing Amelia	Shortlist	
2015	Tom Bouman	Dry Bones in the Valley	Winner	
2015	Julia Dahl	Invisible City	Shortlist	
2015	Allen Eskens	The Life We Bury	Shortlist	
2015	C. B. McKenzie	Bad Country	Shortlist	
2015	Adam Sternbergh	Shovel Ready	Shortlist	
2015	Ashley Weaver	Murder at the Brightwell	Shortlist	
2016	Viet Thanh Nguyen	The Sympathizer	Winner	
2016	Glen Erik Hamilton	Past Crimes	Shortlist	
2016	David Joy	Where All Light Tends to Go	Shortlist	
2016	Jessica Knoll	Luckiest Girl Alive	Shortlist	
2016	Rebecca Scherm	Unbecoming	Shortlist	
2017	Flynn Berry	Under the Harrow	Winner	
2017	Bill Beverly	Dodgers	Shortlist	
2017	Joe Ide	IQ	Shortlist	
2017	Nicholas Petrie	The Drifter	Shortlist	
2017	Lili Wright	Dancing with the Tiger	Shortlist	
2017	Heather Young	The Lost Girls	Shortlist	
2018	Jordan Harper	She Rides Shotgun	Winner	
2018	Deborah E. Kennedy	Tornado Weather	Shortlist	
2018	Winnie M Li	Dark Chapter	Shortlist	
2018	Melissa Scrivner Love	Lola	Shortlist	
2018	Emily Ruskovich	Idaho	Shortlist	
2019	James A. McLaughlin	Bearskin	Winner	
2019	Bradley Harper	A Knife in the Fog	Shortlist	
2019	Debra Jo Immergut	The Captives	Shortlist	
2019	Nova Jacobs	The Last Equation of Isaac Severy	Shortlist	
2019	Delia Owens	Where the Crawdads Sing	Shortlist	

=== 2020s ===
2020s Best First Novel winners and finalists
Year	Author	Title	Result	Ref.
2020	Angie Kim	Miracle Creek	Winner	
2020	Samantha Downing	My Lovely Wife	Shortlist	
2020	John McMahon	The Good Detective	Shortlist	
2020	Lara Prescott	The Secrets We Kept	Shortlist	
2020	John Vercher	Three-Fifths	Shortlist	
2020	Lauren Wilkinson	American Spy	Shortlist	
2021	Caitlin Mullen	Please See Us	Winner	
2021	Nev March	Murder in Old Bombay	Shortlist	
2021	Elisabeth Thomas	Catherine House	Shortlist	
2021	David Heska Wanbli Weiden	Winter Counts	Shortlist	
2021	Stephanie Wrobel	Darling Rose Gold	Shortlist	
2022	Erin Flanigan	Deer Season	Winner	
2022	Vera Kurian	Never Saw Me Coming	Shortlist	
2022	Fabian Nicieza	Suburban Dicks	Shortlist	
2022	JoAnne Tompkins	What Comes After	Shortlist	
2022	Caitlin Wahrer	The Damage	Shortlist	
2023	Eli Cranor	Don’t Know Tough	Winner	
2023	Erin E. Adams	Jackal	Shortlist	
2023	Ramona Emerson	Shutter	Shortlist	
2023	Katie Gutierrez	More Than You’ll Ever Know	Shortlist	
2023	Grace D. Li	Portrait of a Thief	Shortlist	
2024	I.S. Berry	The Peacock and the Sparrow	Winner	
2024	Amy Chua	The Golden Gate	Shortlist	
2024	Ken Jaworowski	Small Town Sins	Shortlist	
2024	Kristen Loesch	The Last Russian Doll	Shortlist	
2024	Ritu Mukerji	Murder by Degrees	Shortlist	
2025	Henry Wise	Holy City	Winner	
2025	Ash Clifton	Twice the Trouble	Shortlist	
2025	Kerri Hakoda	Cold to the Touch	Shortlist	
2025	Audrey Lee	The Mechanics of Memory	Shortlist	
2025	David Lewis	A Jewel in the Crown	Shortlist	
2025	Lawrence Robbins	The President's Lawyer	Shortlist	
2026	Jakob Kerr	Dead Money	Winner	
2026	Hannah Deitch	Killer Potential	Shortlist	
2026	Sarah Harman	All the Other Mothers Hate Me	Shortlist	
2026	Kevin Wade	Johnny Careless	Shortlist	
2026	Zoe B. Wallbrook	History Lessons	Shortlist	
