= Bouchercon XLV =

2014 mystery and detective fiction convention

- "Murder at the Beach"
- Date: November 13, 2014
- Location: Long Beach, CA
- Country: USA
- Hosted by: Ingrid Willis

Bouchercon is an annual convention of creators and devotees of mystery and detective fiction. It is named in honour of writer, reviewer, and editor Anthony Boucher; also the inspiration for the Anthony Awards, which have been issued at the convention since 1986. This page details Bouchercon XLV and the 2014 Anthony Awards ceremony.

== Bouchercon ==
The convention was held at Long Beach, California from 13–16 November 2014. The event was chaired by Ingrid Willis.

=== Special guests ===
- Toastmaster: Simon Wood
- Fan Guest of Honor: Al Abramson
- American Guest of Honor: J. A. Jance
- International Guest of Honor: Edward Marston
- YA Guest of Honor: Eoin Colfer
- Lifetime Achievement: Jeffery Deaver
- The David Thompson Memorial Special Service Award: Judy Bobalik

== Anthony Awards ==
The following list details the awards distributed at the 2014 annual Anthony Awards ceremony.

Award	Author	Work	Result
Best Novel	William Kent Krueger	Ordinary Grace	Won
Best Novel	Robert Crais	Suspect	Shortlist
Best Novel	Sara J. Henry	A Cold and Lonely Place	Shortlist
Best Novel	Hank Phillippi Ryan	The Wrong Girl	Shortlist
Best Novel	Julia Spencer-Fleming	Through the Evil Days	Shortlist
Best First Novel	Matt Coyle	Yesterday’s Echo	Won
Best First Novel	Roger Hobbs	Ghostman	Shortlist
Best First Novel	Becky Masterman	Rage Against the Dying	Shortlist
Best First Novel	Kimberly McCreight	Reconstructing Amelia	Shortlist
Best First Novel	Todd Robinson	The Hard Bounce	Shortlist
Best Paperback Original	Catriona McPherson	As She Left It	Won
Best Paperback Original	Chris F. Holm	The Big Reap	Shortlist
Best Paperback Original	Darrell James	Purgatory Key	Shortlist
Best Paperback Original	Stephen King	Joyland	Shortlist
Best Paperback Original	Alex Marwood	The Wicked Girls	Shortlist
Best Short Story	John Connolly	"The Caxton Private Lending Library & Book Depository"	Won
Best Short Story	Craig Faustus Buck	"Dead End"	Shortlist
Best Short Story	Denise Dietz	"Annie and the Grateful Dead"	Shortlist
Best Short Story	Travis Richardson	"Incident on the 405"	Shortlist
Best Short Story	Art Taylor	"The Care and Feeding of Houseplants"	Shortlist
Best Critical Non-fiction Work	Daniel Stashower	The Hour of Peril	Won
Best Critical Non-fiction Work	Maria Konnikova	Mastermind: How To Think Like Sherlock Holmes	Shortlist
Best Critical Non-fiction Work	Cate Lineberry	The Secret Rescue	Shortlist
Best Critical Non-fiction Work	Josh Stallings	All the Wild Children	Shortlist
Best Critical Non-fiction Work	Sarah Weinman	Troubled Daughters, Twisted Wives	Shortlist
Best Children's or Young Adult Novel	Joelle Charbonneau	The Testing	Won
Best Children's or Young Adult Novel	Margaux Froley	Escape Theory	Shortlist
Best Children's or Young Adult Novel	Chris Grabenstein	Escape from Mr. Lemoncello’s Library	Shortlist
Best Children's or Young Adult Novel	Elizabeth Kiem	Dancer, Daughter, Traitor, Spy	Shortlist
Best Children's or Young Adult Novel	Penny Warner	The Code Busters Club	Shortlist
Best TV Episode Teleplay, First aired in 2013	Jon Bokenkamp	Pilot of The Blacklist – Sept. 2013	Won
Best TV Episode Teleplay, First aired in 2013	Allan Cubitt	“Dark Descent” for The Fall - May 2013	Shortlist
Best TV Episode Teleplay, First aired in 2013	Vince Gilligan	“Felina” in Breaking Bad - Sept. 2013	Shortlist
Best TV Episode Teleplay, First aired in 2013	Kevin Williamson	Pilot of The Following - Jan 2013	Shortlist
Best TV Episode Teleplay, First aired in 2013	Graham Yost	“Hole in the Wall” in Justified - Jan 2013	Shortlist
Best Audio Book	Robert Galbraith (narrator)	The Cuckoo’s Calling	Won
Best Audio Book	Christina Cox (narrator)	Crescendo by Deborah J. Ledford	Shortlist
Best Audio Book	Mauro Hantman (narrator)	Man in the Empty Suit by Sean Ferrell	Shortlist
Best Audio Book	Davina Porter (narrator)	Death and the Lit Chick by G. M. Malliet	Shortlist
Best Audio Book	Tracy Sallows (narrator)	Hour of the Rat by Lisa Brackmann	Shortlist
