= Grand Street Campus =

Public school campus in New York City

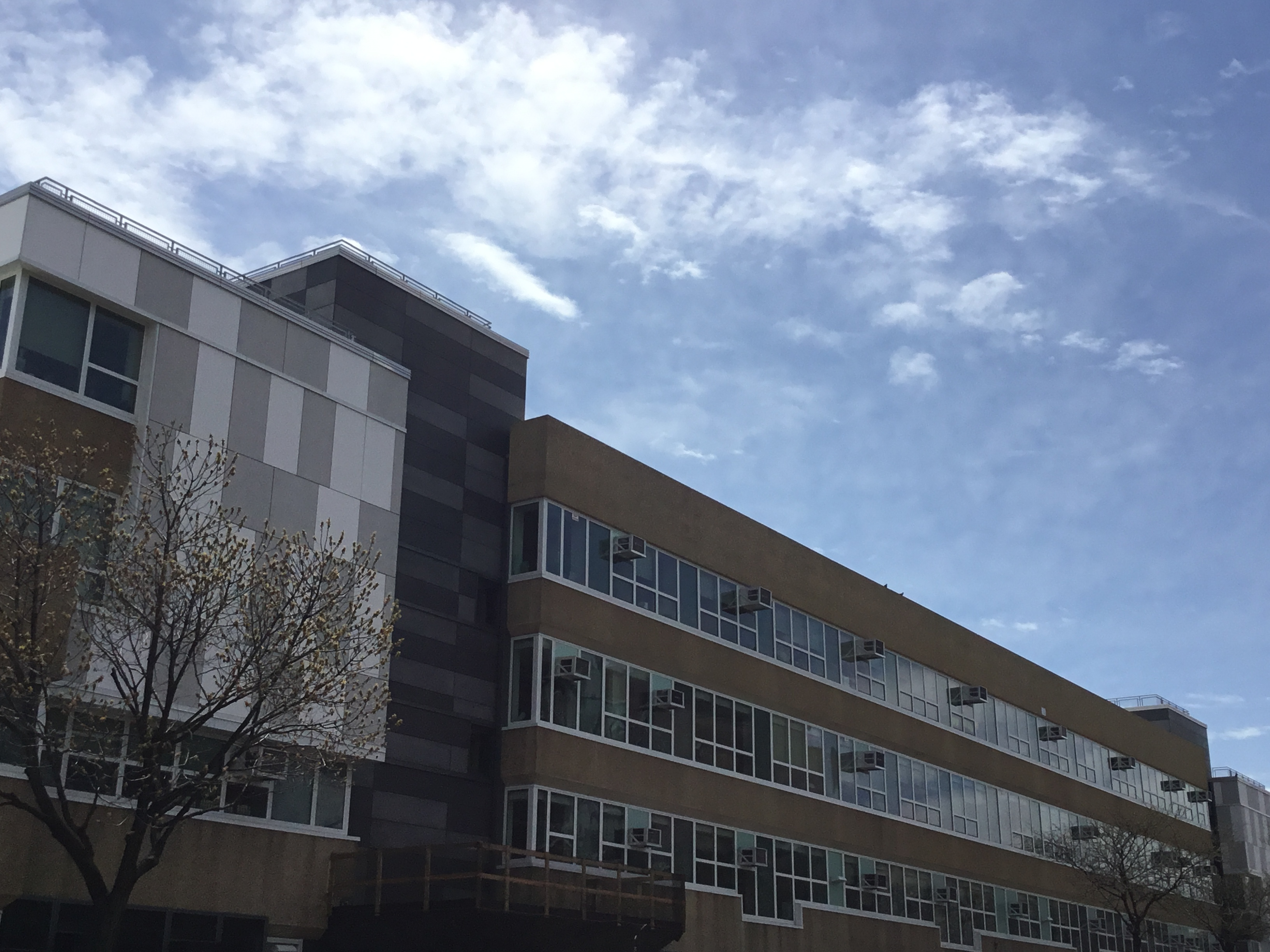
Grand Street Campus in 2022.

The Grand Street Campus is a building used as the home for three high schools in Williamsburg, Brooklyn, New York City. The current building at 850 Grand Street opened in 1981; its identity as the Grand Street Campus dates to 1996. It is currently the home of The High School for Enterprise, Business and Technology, PROGRESS High School for Professional Careers, and the East Williamsburg Scholars Academy.

The history of the Campus dates back to the Eastern District High School, a defunct public high school. Eastern District was founded in 1900 and was originally located at Driggs Avenue and South 3rd Street. It later moved to 227 Marcy Avenue, and finally to 850 Grand Street in 1981. It was a comprehensive high school. Eastern District High School operated from 1900 to mid-1996, when it was closed because of poor academic performance. After Eastern District High School closed, the building was rebranded in late 1996 as the Grand Street Campus, with several smaller new schools operating within the same facilities.

== History ==
=== As Eastern District High School ===
Eastern District High School

Location
- 850 Grand Street; Brooklyn, New York 11211; United States; 40°42′43″N 73°56′21″W

Information
- Type: Public
- Opened: February 5, 1900
- Closed: 1996 (re-opened as Grand Street Campus)
- First principal: William T. Vlymen (1900-1930)
- Last principal: Floyd Green (1990-1996)
- Enrollment: 3,300 (1992); 1,800 (2001) (As Grand Street Campus)
- Team name: Knights (Eastern District); Wolves (Grand Street)

==== Original buildings ====
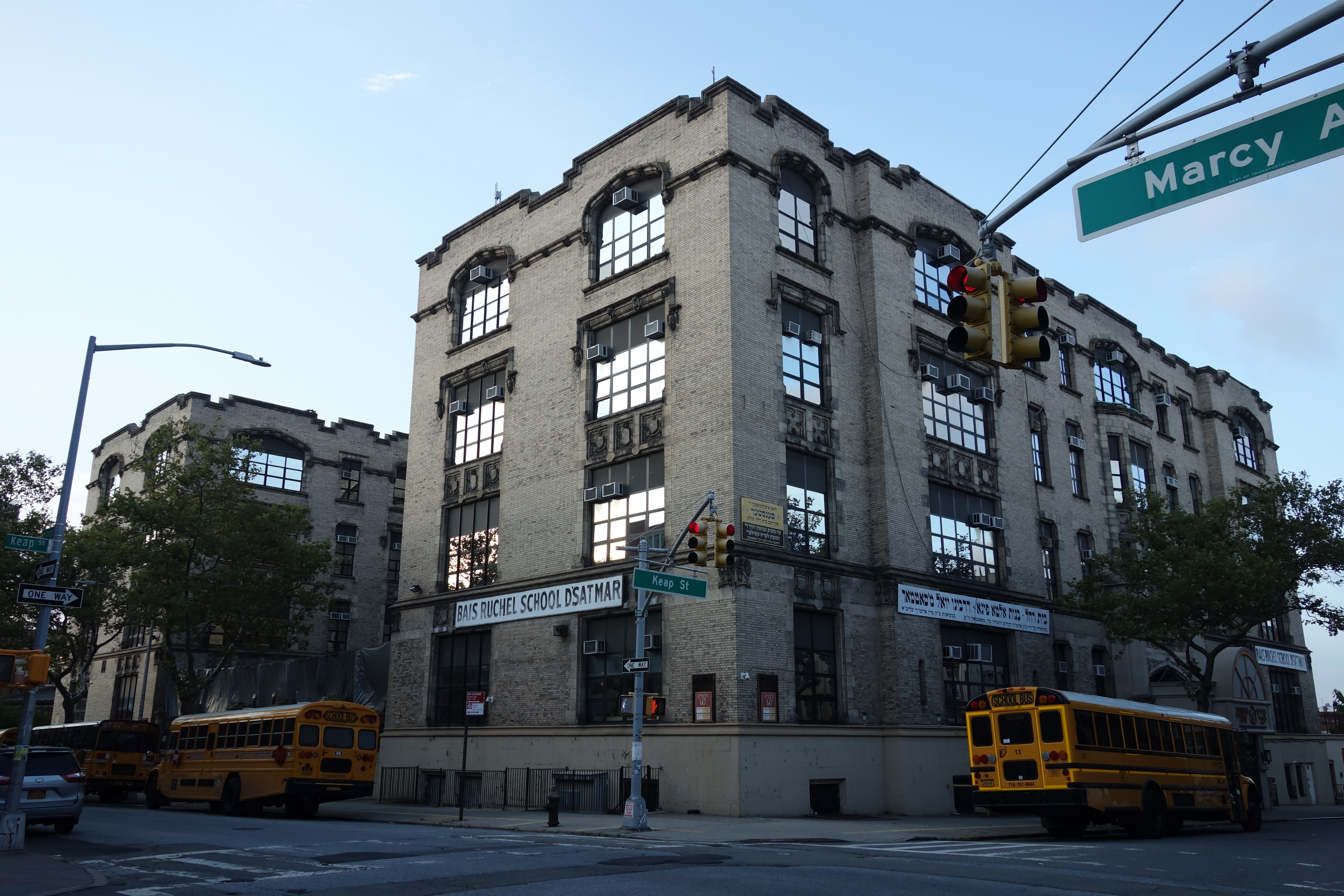
The Marcy Avenue location of the high school, opened in 1907.

Eastern District High School was proposed in 1894, prior to unification of the five boroughs of New York City. The name "Eastern District" originates from the annexation of Williamsburg and Bushwick into the city of Brooklyn as its Eastern District in 1855. The school held its first classes on February 5, 1900, with 188 students. It was originally located at a temporary site on Driggs Avenue and South 3rd Street on the north side of the Williamsburg Bridge, converted from the former Eastern District Library. In 1902, operations were expanded to the nearby Henry McCaddin Memorial Hall at 288 Berry Street between South 2nd and South 3rd Streets. McCaddin Hall still stands adjacent to the Saints Peter and Paul Church, and later served as a school for the Catholic parish, as well as a library and a concert hall. Eastern District graduated its first class in 1904. Later, Public School 143 on North Ninth Street and Havemeyer Street was used as a third annex.

The second location, opened in fall 1907, was situated in western Williamsburg on Marcy Avenue between Keap Street and Rodney Street. It sat across the street from the Williamsburgh branch of the Brooklyn Public Library and near the Marcy Avenue Station of the BMT Jamaica Line (currently served by the J, M, and Z trains). The H-shaped building was constructed with gray brick, limestone, and terracotta in Collegiate and English Gothic style.

Beginning in the 1960s, Eastern District High School was one of several schools plagued by overcrowding, poor academic performance, low attendance, and student unrest. Frequent demonstrations — both non-violent and violent — by students, parents, and community leaders were met with a large NYPD presence. In the spring of 1969, the school was closed several times after a student protest, an incident of vandalism in which glass partitions and windows were shattered, a series of 10 small fires set primarily in the school's cafeteria, and finally a student riot in the cafeteria. The unrest was due to demands to the principal by the school's student leadership not being met, including dismissing a school dean.

Reflective of the large Puerto Rican population of the school at the time, Eastern District employed the first Puerto Rican high school principal in New York City when Marco Hernandez was appointed as acting principal in August 1971.

Built to serve a maximum of 1,800 students, Eastern District had an enrollment of 2,900 students by the time the Marcy Avenue building closed in April 1981. The overcrowding had forced over 500 students to attend classes in either a schoolyard annex or the local YMCA. That same month Eastern District was moved to its current location. The Marcy Avenue building is currently used by a yeshiva school for girls, Bais Ruchel d'Satmar.

==== New building ====
Following the closure of the Marcy Avenue location, Eastern District moved into its final location in eastern Williamsburg. Known as "Northeast Brooklyn High School" during construction, the four-story building and campus was built to alleviate crowding both in EDHS and Bushwick High School. The new building opened on April 1, 1981.

In its final years of operation in the 1980s and early 1990s, Eastern District continued to be known for poor academics and frequent violence and safety issues. The school had high dropout and truancy rates, with graduation consistently below 20%. The violence, including fights between students and attacks on faculty members, was attributed to both overcrowding and conflicts between the Black, Dominican, and Puerto Rican populations of the school. The school was also one of the first to receive weekly metal detector screenings and later permanent metal detectors. The violence and poor performance led principal Sonia Rivera to be removed in 1990 by Schools Chancellor Joseph Fernandez. Rivera was later charged with incompetence by the New York City Board of Education. The school was moved from the state's list of failing schools to the Chancellor's District of perennially failing schools, and a two-day boycott was held by parents and students in 1992 due to the dire state of the school. The school was ranked as the "second most violent school in the city" in the 1994-1995 academic year, with 232 incidents of violence. Eastern District High School was closed following the 1995-1996 academic year, in which the school had a 30% dropout rate and a 62.3% attendance rate.

=== As Grand Street Campus ===
In the fall of 1996, the building was reopened as Grand Street Campus, housing several small high schools under one roof. Grand Street was one of the first former large high schools in New York City to be reopened as an "educational campus." As part of the restructuring, the campus' metal detectors were removed. The new schools were The High School for Enterprise, Business and Technology, Progress High School for Professional Careers, the High School for Legal Studies, and Eastern District Senior Academy. Senior Academy, an alternative assessment school, only operated for two school years, closing in June 1998 and enrolling only junior and senior students from the former high school. Following a special investigation, 61 of the 227 students who graduated from the school had their diplomas revoked due to not satisfying outstanding academic requirements, and over half of the graduates' diplomas were found to be issued under questionable circumstances. The school was found to have awarded credits to students for running errands, working at certain jobs, or for taking classes with little relation to the requirements they satisfied.

The other three schools remain in operation; each initially enrolled approximately 600 students, with current enrollment at about 1000 students per school. The High School for Enterprise, Business, and Technology had a four year graduation rate of 80% in 2012. Progress High School and the School for Legal Studies graduated 55% and 65% of their students that year respectively.

The schools share the athletics program as the Grand Street Wolves, and have won multiple PSAL championships. The baseball team in particular has produced several NCAA Division I and professional players, most notably Dellin Betances. The schools also share a large performing arts department including three concert bands, two jazz ensembles, a choir and a comprehensive dance program. Advanced Placement courses are also shared amongst the three schools.

== Current schools ==
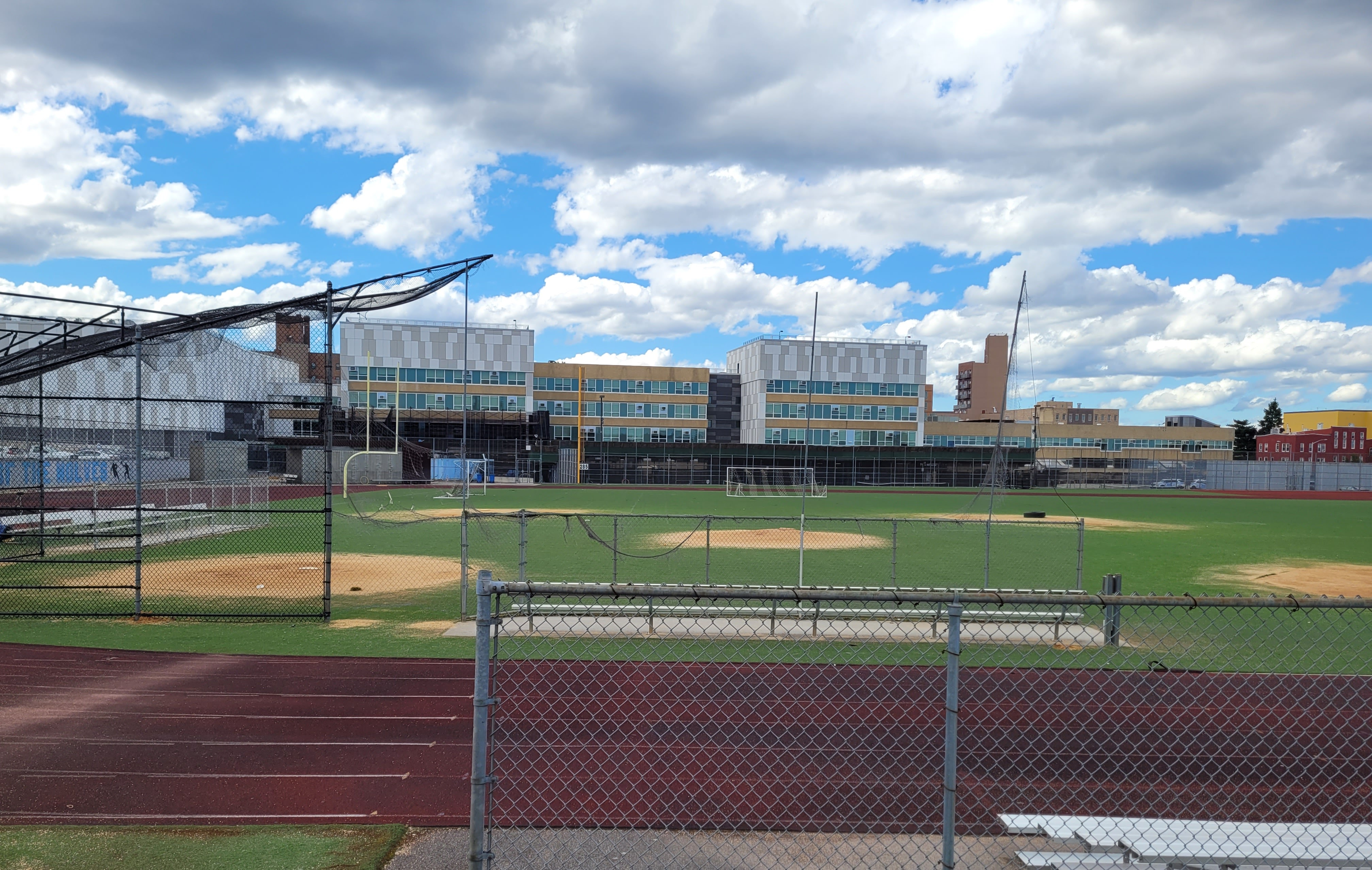
The adjoining athletic field, which is shared by all three schools at the Grand Street Campus

=== High School of Enterprise, Business, & Technology ===
The High School of Enterprise, Business, & Technology, abbreviated as EBT, was founded by longtime Stuyvesant High School teacher Juan S. Mendez, occupying the fourth floor of campus. The school observes a uniformed dress code, and offers four different programs (Computer Science, Business & Finance, Gateway: Math and Science, Music). EBT was the first GSC school to be removed from the list of Schools Under Registration Review (SURR) in 2000, and has had graduation rates both higher than its sister schools and above Brooklyn average.

=== PROGRESS High School for Professional Careers ===
Progress High School was founded in conjunction with the nonprofit organization PROGRESS, Inc. (Puerto Rican Organization for Growth, Research, Education and Self Sufficiency). It features four programs (Medical Professions, Gateway: Math and Science, Instrumental Music, Fine Art) and four Advanced Placement courses. It was the first GSC school to be removed from New York State's list of failing schools.

=== East Williamsburg Scholars Academy ===
East Williamsburg Scholars Academy, formerly High School for Legal Studies, feature two programs (Legal Studies, Computer Forensics) centered on the area of Law and Government, with a third track for performing arts. Like EBT, Scholars Academy observes a dress code. Located on the third floor of the campus, the school has the smallest student body within the campus. It was the last school to come off the SURR review list in 2003.

In February 1997, prominent lawyer Johnnie Cochran served as "principal for a day" at the school.

== Facilities ==
Today's Grand Street Campus, opened in 1981, is located at Grand Street and Bushwick Avenue in East Williamsburg, with direct access to the L train of the BMT Canarsie Line. The suburban-style campus was constructed on former commercial and industrial land, at a cost of $46 million. The four-story school building with a 4,000 student capacity features two cafeterias, six gymnasiums, nine computer labs, and several Industrial arts rooms including auto and woodshop. At the southern end of the three-block long campus is the athletic facility, featuring multiple tennis and handball courts, and a large multi-purpose field circumscribed by a running track, featuring dirt cutouts or sliding pits and a pitching mound for baseball. Initially the field was constructed of AstroTurf, and unusable until repairs were made. The field was renovated in 2003 under the city's Take the Field initiative, replacing the AstroTurf with modern artificial turf, and adding cutouts and a mound for softball as well as a field house.

To update the medical care of Grand Street Campus' students, the Campus has a partnership with nearby Woodhull Hospital for an on-campus clinic.

== In popular culture ==
In Betty Smith's 1943 book A Tree Grows in Brooklyn, one of the principal characters, Cornelius "Neeley" Nolan, attends Eastern District High.

== Notable alumni ==
=== Eastern District High School ===
- Charles Abrams, urbanist and housing expert, founder of the New York City Housing Authority
- Red Auerbach, basketball guard, NBA coach and general manager, Hall of Fame
- Gertrude Blanch, mathematician
- Mark Breland, World Champion Boxer
- Mel Brooks, actor, writer, director
- Henry Foner FLM union activist
- Jack D. Foner, historian
- Moe Foner, 1199 Union activist
- Philip S. Foner, American Marxist labor historian and teacher
- Daniel Fuchs, novelist and Academy Award-winning screenwriter.
- Lena Gurr (1897–1992), artist
- Harry Halpern, East Midwood Jewish Center rabbi
- Petri Hawkins-Byrd, television personality
- Vic Hershkowitz, American handball player, New York City Firefighter
- Homicide, wrestler
- Stan Isaacs, sportswriter
- Williams Jerez, baseball player
- Marvin Kaplan (1927–2016), actor
- Solly Krieger (1909– 1964), middleweight champion boxer
- Edward S. Lentol, lawyer and politician
- Arthur Levitt, Sr., lawyer and politician, father of former SEC chairman Arthur Levitt, Jr.
- Gene Malin, actor
- Barry Manilow, singer, composer
- George Vincent McLaughlin, banker, public official, New York City Police Commissioner
- Memphis Bleek, rapper
- Henry Miller, writer
- Joseph Papp, theater producer and founder of the Public Theater
- Michael E. Reiburn (1893–1982), graduate class of 1911, New York assemblyman and state senator, disbarred lawyer convicted of fraud and theft
- Frank Rodriguez, major league baseball player
- Angela Carlozzi Rossi (1901-1977), social worker
- Nathan D. Shapiro, lawyer and New York State assemblyman
- Mark Warnow, violinist and orchestral composer

=== Grand Street Campus ===
- Dellin Betances (PROGRESS High School), All Star pitcher for the New York Yankees
- José Cuas, pitcher for the Kansas City Royals.
- Olakunle Fatukasi, linebacker for the Rutgers Scarlet Knights
- Williams Jerez, pitcher for the Los Angeles Angels

== Notable faculty ==
=== Eastern District High School ===
- Herb Bernstein, musical composer and record producer, physical education teacher and basketball coach
- Saul Rogovin, former major league pitcher, 1951 AL ERA leader, English teacher for eight years until 1990.
- Eulalie Spence, a Harlem Renaissance playwright, taught English, Drama, and elocution at Eastern District High School from 1927 to 1938; mentor to Joseph Papp.

=== Grand Street Campus ===
- Rebecca Pawel (EBT High School), novelist and winner of the 2004 Edgar Award for "Best First Novel", teaches English and occasionally Spanish.
