= Lantigua =

Lantigua is a surname. Notable people with the surname include:

- Enrique Lantigua (1910–1985), Dominican baseball player
- John Lantigua (born 1947), American journalist and crime novelist
- William Lantigua (born 1955), American politician
