= Foreign =

Foreign may refer to:

== Government ==
- Foreign policy, how a country interacts with other countries
- Ministry of Foreign Affairs, in many countries
  - Foreign Office, a department of the UK government
  - Foreign office and foreign minister
- United States state law, a legal matter in another state

== Science and technology ==
- Foreign accent syndrome, a side effect of severe brain injury
- Foreign key, a constraint in a relational database

== Arts and entertainment ==
- Foreign film or world cinema, films and film industries of non-English-speaking countries
- Foreign music or world music
- Foreign literature or world literature
- Foreign Policy, a magazine

=== Songs ===
- "Foreign" (song), by Trey Songz, 2014
- "Foreign", by Jessica Mauboy from Get 'Em Girls, 2010
- "Foreign", by Lil Pump from Lil Pump, 2017
- "Foreign", by Lil Tecca from Virgo World, 2020
- "Foreign", by Playboi Carti from Die Lit, 2018
- "Foreign", by Young M.A from Herstory in the Making, 2019
- "Foreign", by Lungskull, 2020

== Other uses ==
- Foreign corporation, a corporation that can do business outside its jurisdiction

== See also ==
- Foreigner (disambiguation)
