= Target Practice =

Target Practice may refer to:

- Target practice, a military and shooting exercise
- Target Practice (novel), a 1974 novel by Nicholas Meyer
- Target Practice (video game) or Shooting Arcade, a 1982 Atari fixed shooter game
- Target Practice, a 2014 Cleopatra in Space graphic novel by Mike Maihack
- Target Practice, a 2016 album by Nature

== Songs ==
- "Target Practice" (song), by Belouis Some, 1984
- "Target Practice", by Asian Dub Foundation from Punkara, 2008
- "Target Practice", by Bill Frisell from The High Sign/One Week, 1995
- "Target Practice", by Jedi Mind Tricks from Violence Begets Violence, 2011
- "Target Practice", by Kiss It Goodbye, 1997
- "Target Practice", by Zion I from Break a Dawn, 2006
