= Bent Road =

2011 book by Lori Roy

- Author: Lori Roy
- Genre: Mystery, Thriller
- Published: 2011
- Publisher: Dutton
- Pages: 368
- Awards: Edgar Award for Best First Novel by an American Author (2012)
- ISBN: 978-0-525-95183-4
- Website: Bent Road

Bent Road is a book written by American author Lori Roy, first published by Dutton on March 31, 2011. It was Roy's debut novel. This book later went on to win the Edgar Award for Best First Novel by an American Author in 2012.
