= Shovel Ready (novel) =

2014 novel by Adam Sternbergh

First edition

Shovel Ready is a science fiction novel by journalist Adam Sternbergh. It is Sternbergh's first novel and was released on January 14, 2014, by the Crown Publishing Group.

It shortlisted for the Edgar Allan Poe Award for Best First Novel in .2015.

== Setting ==
The book takes place in a devastated near-future New York City when economic disparity and gentrification spiked in pronounced ways. Its narrator and main character roams around a depopulated New York in order to get and perform contracts. Meanwhile, the middle class have fled the area. The rich can afford to escape reality whenever they want, and the less fortunate must "contend with the charred remains of Manhattan."

== Reception ==
The novel has been reviewed by Publishers Weekly, The Boston Globe, The Guardian, Chicago Tribune.

A running theme was that the novel, while enjoyed by many of the reviewers, is not for all audiences due to its subject matter and tone. Writing for Chicago Tribune, Michael Robbins called the novel "a lean thriller" but admitted that it's "not perfect or anything", a "less ambitious work than those geek scriptures" like William Gibson's Neuromancer (1984) and Neal Stephenson's Snow Crash (1992). "Once you hear the plot description ... either you know it’s not for you or you want to know if it's as awesome as it sounds." Jesse Singal of The Boston Globe summed that the book "strikes out at many targets and mostly connects", but that "certain sci-fi elements are served up merely lukewarm." Kirkus Reviews described it as "tough, sordid and definitely not for every taste." In the Guardian, the reviewer wonders about the appeal of psychopaths as heroes, antiheroes or narrators – "what's with all the lovable murderers? Shovel Ready suggests, in an oblique kind of way, that the issue is one of a broader social disengagement, but I think there's something more designedly amoral going on."

Many outlets praised the prose writing and narrative style, primarily commenting on the cadence of the hitman protagonist, with markedly rhythmic and short sentences, "telegraphic in style". "Sternbergh", Robbins said, "knows his away around the style", and splitting the cuteness that is good writing from the minority of times that it goes overboard, assessed that "most of the novel is likably streamlined." Singal, despite reservtions, "an enjoyable read, mostly because of Spademan’s strong — if occasionally heavyhanded — narration." the Guardian said that the plot drives grippingly, it is Chandleresque, with "tough-guy brevity leavened with hard-edged wit" & "swiftness, structured around a series of expertly timed twists and shocks." Publishers Weekly was less kind, decrying it "low-rent Raymond Chandler noir told in the style of very late James Ellroy."

== Adaption ==
A feature film based on the novel is in development by Warner Bros. Erwin Stoff will produce the film. Denzel Washington is expected to play the central role, a hitman in New York City.
