= Williams Jerez =

Dominican baseball player (born 1992)

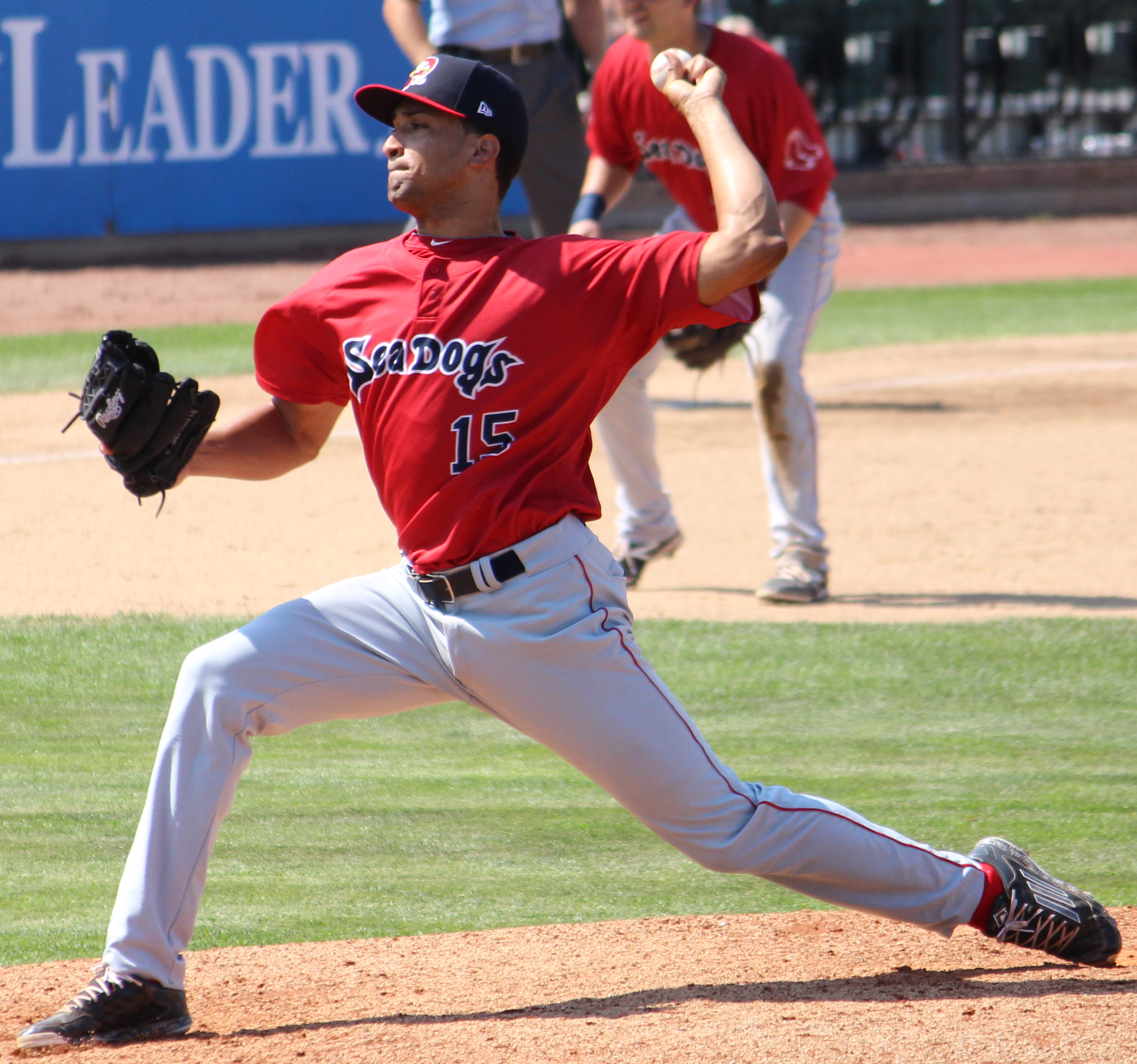
- Jerez with the Portland Sea Dogs in 2015

Free agent
- Pitcher
- Born: May 16, 1992 (age 34); Santiago, Dominican Republic
- Bats: Left Throws: Left

MLB debut
- August 7, 2018, for the Los Angeles Angels

MLB statistics (through 2019 season)
- Win–loss record: 1–0
- Earned run average: 5.33
- Strikeouts: 24
- Stats at Baseball Reference

Teams
- Los Angeles Angels (2018); San Francisco Giants (2019); Pittsburgh Pirates (2019)

Williams Alexander Jerez (Spanish pronunciation: [jeˈɾeθ] born May 16, 1992) is a Dominican professional baseball pitcher who is a free agent. He was a 2nd round selection in the 2011 MLB draft by the Boston Red Sox. He has previously played in Major League Baseball (MLB) for the Los Angeles Angels, San Francisco Giants, and Pittsburgh Pirates.

== Early life ==
Jerez was born in Santiago de los Caballeros in the Dominican Republic. During his childhood, he was primarily a pitcher. In 2009 at the age of 17, Jerez along with his father and sister moved to Bushwick, Brooklyn in New York City. That year, he was discovered in a local park by a former minor league player.

Initially attempting to enroll at Gregorio Luperón High School in Manhattan, Jerez later enrolled at Grand Street Campus in Williamsburg, Brooklyn. Jerez played center field at Grand Street for two seasons. He hit .519 with four home runs and 19 RBIs his first season. During his senior year he hit .692 with five home runs and 26 stolen bases, leading Grand Street to the 2011 Public Schools Athletic League (PSAL) Class A semi-finals. Jerez won the PSAL Wingate Award, given to the top senior in each sport. He also played summer baseball for Hank's Yanks, a team sponsored by Hank Steinbrenner. Jerez, however, drew controversy with some opposing coaches believing him to be older than high-school age.

Coming out of high school, Jerez was considered a five-tool prospect, and was ranked among the top 100 prospects in the nation by both ESPN and Baseball America. His skill set drew comparisons to Carlos Beltrán. He received a baseball scholarship to San Jacinto College in Texas.

== Career ==
=== Boston Red Sox ===
The Boston Red Sox selected Jerez in the second round of the 2011 MLB draft, signing him with a bonus of $443,700. He was the highest draft pick out of New York City since pitcher Jason Marquis in 1996. Jerez started his career as an outfielder, but was converted to a pitcher during extended spring training in 2014.

He made his debut with the Gulf Coast League Red Sox in 2012 and collected hits in 11 of 12 games during one early-season stretch, batting as high as .340, but eventually he tapered off. He finished the year batting .248/.285/.310 with five stolen bases, three triples, and just six walks in 32 games.

In 2012, Jerez started 32 games with the Short-Season A Lowell Spinners before missing the remainder of the season with hand injury. Prior to injury, Jerez batted .241 (20-for-83)/.276/.277 with five RBI and three stolen bases.

Then in 2013, he appeared in 38 games and hit a paltry .176/.203/.235 in 38 games while playing right and center field for Lowell. But Jerez turned his career around after moving from outfield to pitcher in 2014. In that season, he posted a 3–1 record with a 2.22 ERA and one save coming out of bullpen for the GCL Red Sox. He ended the season at Lowell, going 1–1 with a 4.50 ERA.

In 2015 Jerez joined the Low–A Greenville Drive, where he went 3–1 with a 2.06 ERA and three saves, striking out 43 in 39⅓ innings of work. He then gained a promotion to High A Salem Red Sox and was more dominant, posting a 1–0 record with a 0.73 ERA and 12 strikeouts in 12 innings. The Portland Sea Dogs would be the fifth stop in just a year and a half for Jerez, as he collected scoreless outings in 13 of 22 appearances since his Double-A debut on June 24, 2015. Overall, he went 5–3 with a 2.54 ERA and four saves in a career-high 41 games during the three stints.

Jerez was added to the Red Sox 40-man roster on November 20, 2015. He remained with the Sea Dogs through 2016, featuring a 1–6 mark with a 4.71 ERA in 40 games, striking out 65 and walking 30 in 65 innings, while earning a selection to the Eastern League All-Star Game.

He opened 2017 at Portland, where he went 2–0 with four saves and 3.10 ERA in 29 games before joining the Triple-A Pawtucket Red Sox in the month of August. He appeared in nine games with the PawSox, going 0–2 with a 3.75 ERA in 12 innings. He finished the year rated as the Red Sox' No. 21 prospect, according to MLB.com. On November 2, 2017, the Red Sox added Jerez to their 40-man roster. He began the 2018 season with Triple-A Pawtucket.

=== Los Angeles Angels ===
On July 31, 2018, the Red Sox traded Jerez and pitcher Ty Buttrey to the Los Angeles Angels for second baseman Ian Kinsler. On August 7, the Angels called up Jerez and he made his major league debut, pitching two scoreless innings against the Detroit Tigers. For 2018 with the Angels, he was 0–0 with a 6.00 ERA, and 15 strikeouts in 15 innings.

=== San Francisco Giants ===
On March 26, 2019, Jerez was traded to the San Francisco Giants in exchange for Chris Stratton. He made 6 appearances for the Giants, recording a 2.70 ERA with 4 strikeouts across 6 2/3 innings of work. On September 10, Jerez was designated for assignment by San Francisco.

=== Pittsburgh Pirates ===
On September 13, 2019, Jerez was claimed off waivers by the Pittsburgh Pirates. In 6 games for Pittsburgh, he struggled to a 7.36 ERA with 5 strikeouts across 3 2/3 innings pitched. On November 27, Jerez was removed from the 40–man roster and sent outright to the Triple–A Indianapolis Indians.

Jerez did not play in a game in 2020 due to the cancellation of the minor league season because of the COVID-19 pandemic. He elected free agency after the on September 28, 2020.

=== Seattle Mariners ===
On May 21, 2021, Jerez signed a minor league contract with the Seattle Mariners. In 19 appearances for the Triple-A Tacoma Rainiers, Jerez struggled to an 11.32 ERA with 23 strikeouts. On August 5, Jerez was released by the Mariners.

=== Staten Island FerryHawks ===
On April 20, 2022, Jerez signed with the Staten Island FerryHawks of the Atlantic League of Professional Baseball. Jerez made 6 appearances for the FerryHawks, struggling to an 0–2 record and 19.29 ERA with 4 strikeouts in 4 2/3 innings pitched. He became a free agent following the season.

=== Charleston Dirty Birds ===
On April 7, 2023, Jerez signed with the Charleston Dirty Birds of the Atlantic League of Professional Baseball. In 31 games for Charleston, he struggled to a 7.29 ERA with 39 strikeouts in 33 1/3 innings pitched. On July 31, Jerez was released by the Dirty Birds.

=== Toros de Tijuana ===
On January 9, 2024, Jerez signed with the Toros de Tijuana of the Mexican League. In 10 games for the Toros, he struggled to a 10.29 ERA with 9 strikeouts across 7 innings pitched. On May 16, Jerez was released by Tijuana.

=== Guerreros de Oaxaca ===
On June 1, 2024, Jerez signed with the Guerreros de Oaxaca of the Mexican League. In 22 games (1 start) for Oaxaca, he struggled to a 8.10 ERA with 22 strikeouts across 20 innings pitched. Jerez was released by the Guerreros on February 21, 2025.

=== Pericos de Puebla ===
On June 22, 2025, Jerez signed with the Pericos de Puebla of the Mexican League. He made 22 appearances for the Pericos, logging a 3–1 record and 3.80 ERA with 17 strikeouts across 21 1/3 innings of relief. Jerez was released by Puebla on January 4, 2026.

== Player profile ==
Jerez throws a fastball in the low 90s, topping out at 97 miles per hour. He also throws a slider and changeup, both with low 80s velocity.
