= Foreigner =

Foreigner may refer to:

== Music ==
- Foreigner (band), a British-American rock band, originally formed in 1976
  - Foreigner (Foreigner album), the 1977 eponymous debut album of said band
- Foreigner (Cat Stevens album), 1973
- "Foreigner", a 2020 song by Pop Smoke from Meet the Woo 2

== Literature ==
- Foreigner (character), a Marvel Comics villain
- Foreigner series, a science fiction series by C. J. Cherryh, named after the first novel Foreigner
- Foreigner (Sawyer novel), a 1994 novel in the Quintaglio Ascension Trilogy by Robert J. Sawyer
- The Foreigner (novel), a 2008 novel by Francie Lin

== Film and theatre ==
- The Foreigner (1921 film), an American silent film also known as God's Crucible
- Foreigners (film), a 1972 Swedish film
- The Foreigner (2003 film), an action film starring Steven Seagal
- The Foreigner (2017 film), an action-thriller film starring Jackie Chan
- Foreigner (2025 film), a Canadian horror film directed by Ava Maria Safai
- The Foreigner (play), a 1984 play by Larry Shue
- Foreigners, a play by Frederick Lonsdale

== See also ==
- Foreigners' Street, a Chinese amusement park in Chongqing
- Alien (law), a person in a country who has fewer rights than a citizen or national
- Stranger
