= High School of Enterprise, Business, & Technology =

Public school in New York City

Coordinates: 40°42′43″N 73°56′20″W

High School for Enterprise, Business and Technology
- EBT

Location
- 850 Grand Street; New York City, New York 11211; United States

Information
- Type: Public
- Motto: EBT is the Future!
- Established: 1996
- School district: 14
- Principal: Holger Carrillo
- Grades: 9-12
- Campus: Grand Street Campus
- Colors: Burgundy and Gray
- Mascot: Grand Street Campus Wolves
- Website: www.ebtbrooklyn.com

The High School for Enterprise, Business, and Technology is a public high school located on the fourth floor of the Grand Street Educational Campus at 850 Grand Street and Bushwick Avenue in the Williamsburg neighborhood of Brooklyn, New York. The school was opened in the fall of 1996 following the closing of Eastern District High School in the spring of that year. The school observes a student dress code. The principal is Holger Carrillo.

== History ==
When Eastern District closed in 1996 as a result of low graduation rates and violence, four schools opened in the building's place: The High School of Enterprise, Business, and Technology; The School for Legal Studies; Progress High School for Professional Careers; and a fourth school that was closed by the fall of 1998. The schools combined formed "The Grand Street Campus".

EBT, as it is known by the students and faculty, and the other schools were the first schools born into the SURR (Schools Under Registration Review) List. In the spring of 2000, a year after graduating its first senior class, the school was first in the campus to pass off the list. EBT had a four-year graduation rate of 80% in 2012, while its fellow Grand Street schools Progress High School and the School for Legal Studies graduated 55% and 65% of their students that year respectively. EBT's graduation rate was 73% in 2013 and 76% in 2014.

The founder of EBT is Juan S. Mendez. Mendez was the deputy chair of the foreign language, technology coordinator, and ASPIRA founder at Stuyvesant High School before opening EBT with the help of Yvette Wharton and Hipolito Fernandez; the latter two currently function as assistant principals at EBT.

== Criteria for graduation ==
Generally a student will attend EBT for four years or eight semesters (or terms). Some graduates anywhere from three years to four and a half years.

To graduate from the High School of Business of Enterprise, Business and Technology a student needs to receive forty or more credits and a rigorous course study of:

- Eight terms (four years) of English
- Seven terms (3 1/2 years) of Physical Education
- Six terms (Three years) of Math
- One term of Health
- Two terms of American History
- Two terms of Art
- Two terms of foreign language
- Six terms of Science
- Two years (four terms) of Global History
- One year (two terms) of art
- One term of an elective

== Areas of study ==
The school concentrates on its namesake topics. When students apply to EBT, there are four programs to choose from: The Academy of Hospitality and Tourism, Computer Networking (Computer Science & Technology) and Gateway: Mathematics and Science Institute for Pre-College Education.

EBT has a chapter in The Academy of Hospitality and Tourism. Students who "major" in the program concentrate on hospitality management and the tourism industry. The students are taught courses in management, marketing and entrepreneuship. Internship opportunities include working at top hotels and corporations, such as W Hotel, Marriott, Waldorf and American Express.

Computer Networking, or Cisco students, learn the inner workings of computers and the construction and mechanisms behind computers, digital information, systems analysis and the Internet.

Business and Finance is a program with a curriculum based on preparation for careers with the joint effort of corporate partnerships.

Gateway Mathematics and Science Institute (MSI) program focuses on science and math courses. The program is funded by Gateway Institute for Pre-College Education.

Students in the Performing Arts have the opportunity to perform in one of the school's five bands, take AP Music Theory and complete their Advanced Regents Diploma with a music endorsement. EBT is one of only twelve high schools in New York City that offer this full sequence.

=== Electives ===
- Band/Chorus - The band and chorus programs are composed of students from the 3 high schools at the campus and were established in 2002. There are several ensembles of varying skill level in both programs, ranging from beginner level to intermediate-advanced groups. Both groups perform at many festivals at events throughout New York State, such as NYSSMA and the Region 8 Arts Festival. The Bands have received numerous "Gold" and "Gold with Distinction" awards at the NYSSMA festivals.
- Dance - The dance program became very popular during the 2006–2007 year and has received recognition for their performances which consist of ballet, African dance, hip-hop dance, Jazz, and Indian dance.
- Conflict Resolution - Teachers teach students to resolve conflicts with fellow students and students learn to mediate arguments.
- Leadership
- Journalism - Students write articles for the student newspaper "The EBT Eye" and the literary magazine

=== Foreign languages Offered/foreign exchange program ===
Students can take Spanish as a foreign language, and American Sign Language is offered. German was also formerly offered.

=== Advanced Placement and Honor Societies and courses ===
Several Advanced level courses are taken such as AP English Literature and Composition, AP English Language and Composition, Calculus, Physics, American History Honors, AP World History, AP Spanish, AP Music Theory and AP Biology.

The school has a chapter in the National Honor Society, National Technical Honor Society, and The Quill and Scroll Society.

Students who show proficiency in one or several subjects are given the option of taking these courses and other Honors courses.

=== Extra curricular activities and sports ===
In addition to a rigorous curriculum, the student body is encouraged to participate in several clubs such as Drama, DECCA, Future Business Leaders of America and Model United Nations.

The school has several sports teams shared with The School for Legal Studies and Progress High School including:

Boys: Varsity and J/V Football, Handball, Varsity and J/V baseball, Varsity Soccer, Varsity Basketball and Golf.

Girls: Varsity and J/V Basketball, Varsity and J/V Volleyball, Softball, Varsity Volleyball, Varsity Soccer and Varsity basketball.

The school plays host to budding artists, actors and musicians by offering campus wide organizations such as a yearly campus play, 3 campus wind bands, 2 full jazz big bands and EBT uses its 460 Complex as an art gallery to display student's artworks of varying kinds.

== Campus ==
When the Eastern District Campus was erected in 1981, it was considered a modern, suburban-style facility. It was the state-of-the-art facility with a swimming pool, an auto shop (now housing EBT's 199 Art Studio), a home economics room, a typing room, and one of the first computer labs. Many of these facilities offer other services such as business ventures for the school, storage, or converted classrooms.

An after-school program for the students in the neighboring elementary schools provides homework help and games. Students from the campus volunteer and are paid for their time.

Today EBT and the rest of Grand Street Campus continues to grow with more and more students applying every year and with the continuing growth of the schools, and the community.

Students have the option of taking the B43, B53, B57, Q54, Q59 bus or the L train to school; many of the attending all use the routes and a few percent are within walking distance. The neighborhood has a few restaurants, a nearby travel agency, a couple of churches and the Grand Street business improvement district a local shopping district that stretches on Grand Street from Bushwick Avenue to Union Avenue.

To update the medical care of Grand Street Campus' students, the Campus has a partnership with nearby Woodhull Hospital for an on-campus clinic.

== Notable faculty ==
- Rebecca Pawel, novelist and winner of the 2004 Edgar Award for "Best First Novel", teaches English and occasionally Spanish here.
