= Joe Ide =

American novelist

- Born: 1957 or 1958
- Occupation: Crime writer
- Writing career
- Genres: Crime fiction, noir fiction
- Website: joeide.com

Joe Ide (/ˈiːdeɪ/ EE-day, born c. 1958) is an American crime fiction writer of Japanese descent.

== Career ==
Ide grew up in South Central Los Angeles, which he used as the setting for a series of crime novels that feature his recurring young Sherlockian protagonist, Isaiah Quintabe.

Ide's 2016 debut novel IQ received high critical acclaim and was included on numerous Top 10 book lists for both 2016 and 2017. It went on to be nominated for the 2017 Edgar Award for Best First Novel by an American writer, and received many other nominations and awards. IQ's sequel Righteous was also widely praised.

In 2020, it was announced that Snoop Dogg and his Snoopadelic Films would work on a project to produce the IQ novels for television.

== Personal life ==
Ide is a cousin of Francis Fukuyama.

== Bibliography ==
Isaiah "IQ" Quintabe series

- IQ (2016)
- Righteous (2017)
- Wrecked (2018)
- Hi Five (2020)
- Smoke (2021)
- Fixit (2023)

Other novels

- The Goodbye Coast (2022) (A Philip Marlowe Novel)

== Awards and honors ==
- Winner of the Anthony Award for Best First Novel 2017 for IQ
- Winner of the Macavity Award for Best First Mystery 2017 for IQ
- Winner of the Shamus Award for Best First P. I. Novel 2017 for IQ
- Nominated for the Edgar Award for Best First Novel 2017 for IQ
- Nominated for the Barry Award for Best First Novel 2017 for IQ
- Nominated for The Strand Critics Award for Best First Novel 2017 for IQ
- Short-listed for the CWA John Creasey New Blood Dagger 2017/2018 for IQ
- Winner of AudioFile Earphones Award 2016 for IQ (audiobook), narrated by Sullivan Jones
- Winner of AudioFile Earphones Award 2017 for Righteous (audiobook), narrated by Sullivan Jones
- Winner of AudioFile Earphones Award 2018 for Wrecked (audiobook), narrated by Sullivan Jones
- Winner of AudioFile Earphones Award 2020 for Hi-Five (audiobook), narrated by Zeno Robinson
