= Francie Lin =

Taiwanese-American novelist

- Education: Harvard University (BA)
- Occupation: Novelist
- Writing career
- Genres: Mystery; thriller; novel
- Notable work: The Foreigner
- Notable awards: Edgar Award for Best First Novel by an American Author
- Website: francielin.com

Francie Lin is a Taiwanese-American novelist, whose debut novel The Foreigner (2008) won the Edgar Award for Best First Novel by an American Author.

== Background ==
Lin was born to a Taiwanese American immigrant family, and was raised in Salt Lake City, Utah. In 2022, she recalled that her mother was a tiger mom who raised her as a child to play Chopin and Liszt on the piano.

After high school, Lin graduated from Harvard University. After graduation, Lin worked as a teacher and an arts journalist, reviewed books for the San Francisco Chronicle and the Los Angeles Times, and eventually served as the associate editor of The Threepenny Review from 1998 to 2004, where she wrote short pieces, short stories, essays and reviews for. She received a Fulbright Fellowship to Taiwan for the years of 2001–2002, where she gathered material for her first novel, The Foreigner. She currently lives with her husband, historian and writer Stephen Platt, and family in Greenfield, Massachusetts.

== Work ==
Lin wrote and published her first book, a crime novel entitled The Foreigner (2008) - published by Picador - which won the Edgar Award for Best First Novel by an American Author, a prestigious award presented annually by the Mystery Writers of America that honors the most distinguished work in the mystery genre. The Foreigner revolves around a 40-year old Taiwanese American financial analyst named Emerson Chang, who travels from San Francisco to Taipei in order to scatter his mother's ashes and re-establish contact with his shady younger brother, Little P, who has inherited the family hotel and is entangled in the Taiwanese criminal underworld. Chang eventually meets two cousins, Poison and Big One, as well as Little P's scheming friend Atticus (Li An-Qing), who constantly pushes Little P to sell the family hotel to him. Soon Emerson gets himself caught up in the vice of shadowy dealings that Little P runs out of his uncle's karaoke bar, who is concealing a secret about a crime that not only alienated him from the family but also haunts his conscience to this day. As Emerson continues to unravel the mystery of Little P's past and the Taipei hotel property he inherited, he loses his job and is propelled towards saving what is left of his family's legacy.

Publishers Weekly gave the novel a favorable review, stating that the book was a "stunning debut" and that character "[Emerson] Chang's distinctive voice propels a strong and original plot, with horrifying revelations. Taut, smart and often funny, this novel will satisfy readers of thrillers and general fiction alike." The novel also received strong reviews from the Los Angeles Times ("Genre-wise, The Foreigner is best described as a thriller, rife with murders, drugs, secrets and betrayals. But you won't find any of the cardboard characters, clunky writing, or clichéd conventions that too often mar suspense fiction. Lin is equally attentive to description and plot...Lovely, detailed writing makes you care about what happens to these characters...A sequel would prove most welcome"), the San Francisco Chronicle ("Lin demonstrates admirable range and skill in The Foreigner. She's capable of writing both marvelous humor and scenes of utter darkness in her tale of a naive man at a complete loss for dealing with the world."), the Baltimore Sun ("Lin has much to say about the clast of East and West and the sometimes shaky bonds of family, wrapping her sly observations in an entertaining coating of ever-propulsive narrative that turns Emerson from a rich boy into a warier, sleeker, wiser man.") and Kirkus Reviews (which called it "[a] darkly funny debut").

The book was also a June 2008 BookSense pick, and also received positive reviews from the Boston Globe, Colin Harrison, Vroman's Bookstore and Breaking the Fourth Wall.
