= Target Practice (novel) =

1974 crime novel by Nicholas Meyer

- First edition
- Author: Nicholas Meyer
- Language: English
- Genre: Crime fiction Detective fiction
- Publisher: Harcourt Brace Jovanovich
- Publication date: March 20, 1974
- Publication place: United States
- Media type: Print (hardcover, paperback)
- ISBN: 0151879974

Target Practice is a 1974 crime novel by the American author and film director Nicholas Meyer. It was Meyer's second novel but published before the bestselling The Seven-Per-Cent Solution that same year.

== Plot ==
Mark Brill, a private investigator, is hired by the grieving Shelly Rollins after a chance meeting on a plane to investigate charges of treason laid against her brother, a former Army officer who has recently committed suicide.

== Reception ==
Target Practice received moderate praise from critics. Kirkus Reviews criticized the main character as being "rather unconvincing," but described Meyer's writing as possessing "slick efficiency." Publishers Weekly also gave the novel moderate praise, calling it "excellently built-up suspense." Target Practice was subsequently nominated for the 1975 Edgar Award for Best First Novel, but lost to Gregory Mcdonald's Fletch.
