= The Adventure of the Ectoplasmic Man =

1985 book by Daniel Stashower

- First edition
- Author: Daniel Stashower
- Language: English
- Genre: Mystery
- Published: 1985
- Publisher: William Morrow
- Media type: Novel
- Pages: 224
- ISBN: 0688041892 (first edition)

The Adventure of the Ectoplasmic Man is a 1985 mystery pastiche novel written by Daniel Stashower, featuring Sherlock Holmes and Dr. John Watson teaming up with famous magician Harry Houdini.

Titan Books republished the book in 2009, as part of its Further Adventures series, which collects a number of noted Holmesian pastiches, under the abbreviated title of The Ectoplasmic Man.

== Plot ==
Houdini is framed for espionage but Holmes is determined to clear his name, with the real culprits being sinister blackmailers who have targeted the Prince of Wales. Can the duo solve what some believe will become known as 'The Crime of the Century' before it's too late?

== See also ==
- Sherlock Holmes pastiches
