= Eliot Pattison =

American novelist

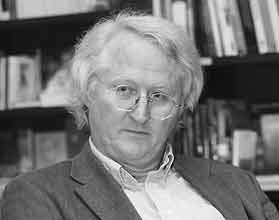
Eliot Pattison (2005)

Eliot Pattison (Joseph Eliot Pattison, b. 20 October 1951) is an American international lawyer, non-fiction author on the subject of international trade, and is best known as an award-winning mystery fiction novelist.

His professional career consists of advising and representing U.S. and foreign companies on international investment and trade issues. He has published five books and more than 30 articles on international topics.

Pattison is best known for his two series of mystery novels set in different time periods and geographic areas.

His Inspector Shan series is set in modern-day Tibet, and features former Beijing Justice Department Investigator Shan Tao Yun. His first novel The Skull Mantra won the Edgar Allan Poe Award in 2000. The Inspector Shan series has been translated into over 20 languages and are sold around the world. The tenth and final book of the series, Bones of the Earth, was released in 2019.

Each novel involves one or more murders which set up a "who-done-it" mystery that protagonist Inspector Shan must resolve. The stories are set against a background of Tibetan history, culture, and religion, reflecting Pattison's extensive research and concern about the impact of Chinese control of modern-day Tibet.

Pattison's Bone Rattler historical mystery series features protagonist Duncan McCallum, a Scottish immigrant to North America in its colonial years. The series begins in territory near modern-day Albany, New York during the French and Indian War. The ongoing series currently consists of six novels.

Pattison's 2011 postapocalyptic crime novel Ashes of the Earth, a departure from his usual subject matter and settings, was critically acclaimed and received starred reviews from both Publishers Weekly and Booklist.

Pattison is married and has three children. He resides with his family on an 18th-century farm in Oley Valley, Pennsylvania.

== Novels ==
Inspector Shan Series

1. The Skull Mantra (1999)
2. Water Touching Stone (2001)
3. Bone Mountain (2002)
4. Beautiful Ghosts (2004)
5. Prayer of the Dragon (2007)
6. The Lord of Death (2009)
7. Mandarin Gate (2012)
8. Soul of the Fire (2014)
9. Skeleton God (2017)
10. Bones of the Earth (2019)

Bone Rattler Series

1. The Bone Rattler (2007)
2. Eye of The Raven (2010)
3. Original Death (2013)
4. Blood of the Oak (2016)
5. Savage Liberty (2018)
6. The King’s Beast (2020)
7. Freedom's Ghost (2023)

Hadrian Boone

1. Ashes of the Earth (2011)

== Non-fiction ==
- Registration of Foreign Agents in the United States: A Practical and Legal Guide (1981) (Edited by Joseph E. Pattison with John L. Taylor)
- Establishing a Transnational Franchise (1988)
- Acquiring the Future: America's Survival and Success in the Global Economy (1990)
- Breaking Boundaries: Public Policy vs. American Business in the World Economy (1996) (Selected by The New York Times as one of the five best management books of the year)
- Antidumping and Countervailing Duty Laws (2003)

== Awards ==
The Skull Mantra won the Edgar Allan Poe Award for Best First Novel in 2000.
