= Lori Roy =

American mystery fiction and Southern Gothic author

Lori Roy (born 1965) is an American mystery fiction and Southern Gothic author. Since 2011, Roy has released five books and two short stories. Of her works, Roy won the 2012 Edgar Award for Best First Novel by an American Author with Bent Road and the 2014 Edgar Award for Best Novel with Until She Comes Home. With her Edgar Award wins, Roy became the first female author to win these two Edgars. Bent Road was also picked by the State Library of Kansas as one of the Kansas Notable Books for 2012. Apart from writing, Roy worked in accounting for Hallmark Cards.

== Early life and education ==
In 1965, Roy was born in Manhattan, Kansas. She began writing while completing her high school education. For her post-secondary education, Roy completed a finance program at the University of Kansas.

== Career ==
Following her studies, Roy was hired by Hallmark Cards and worked in accounting. During the mid-1990s, Roy and her family moved from Kansas City to Tampa Bay, Florida. While in Tampa Bay, Roy ended her accounting career and took care of her children while her husband worked.

In her writing career, The Chattahoochee Review published one of Roy's stories. She attended multiple writers workshops at Eckerd College. Roy wrote two novels and one short story that were never published.

In 2011, Bent Road was the first book by Roy to gain publication. It won an Edgar Award for first novel. Cross Creek Pictures acquired rights and started planning a movie adaption of Bent Road in 2012.

Roy published Until She Comes Home in 2013 and Let Me Die in His Footsteps in 2015. Additionally, Roy published The Disappearing in 2018 and Gone Too Long in 2019. In assembled collections, Roy's short story "Chum in the Water" was part of Tampa Bay Noir in 2020. The following year, Roy was featured in a 2021 Mystery Writers of America publication titled When A Stranger Comes To Town with "Do You Remember".

== Writing process and themes ==
Roy limits the rough draft stage and spends more time on editing. A short story that she did not release was used as the basis for Bent Road. During the two years she took to write Bent Road and get it published, Roy set up social media accounts to advertise the novel. The main characters are a family who move to Kansas during the 1967 Detroit riot. Until She Comes Home takes place in Detroit during 1958. Both books have a plot about a missing person and a previous murder.

For Let Me Die in His Footsteps, Roy set her book in the 1930s and 1950s in Kentucky. Her contemporary works, The Disappearing and Gone Too Long are set in Florida and Georgia, respectively.

During her writing of The Disappearing, Roy focused on individual characters and summarized the completed content before the book was fully written. She based the story on a criminal investigation at the Arthur G. Dozier School for Boys and killings by Ted Bundy. In Gone Too Long, Roy focused on the Ku Klux Klan and included a timeline of the organization. Her books are written in the Southern Gothic and mystery fiction genres.

== Awards ==
In 2012, Bent Road was given the Edgar Award for Best First Novel by an American Author. Bent Road was also named one of the Kansas Notable Books for 2012 by the State Library of Kansas. With Until She Comes Home, Roy was nominated for the 2014 Edgar Award for Best Novel. In 2016, Roy won the Edgar Award for Best Novel with Let Me Die in His Footsteps. She was the first woman author to win these two Edgar Awards.

== Sources ==
- Lori Roy (Ukrainian Wikipedia: Лорі Рой)
