= The Foreigner (novel) =

2008 crime thriller by Francie Lin

The Foreigner is a crime thriller, the first novel by the author Francie Lin. The novel was published on May 27, 2008, and won the 2009 Edgar Award for Best First Novel.
