= Rebecca Scherm =

American author

- Education: University of Michigan (MFA)
- Occupation: Author

Rebecca Scherm is an American author. She published her first novel, Unbecoming, in 2015. She received her MFA from the University of Michigan. She is currently working on a second novel, Beta.
