= Margaret Moseley =

Civil rights activist (1901–1997)

Margaret Moseley (1901–1997) was a civil rights activist. Born in Dedham, she initially planned on being a nurse but was turned away from nursing programs in Boston due to racial discrimination. In the 1940s, she helped found the Cooperative Way, a consumers' cooperative in Boston, as well as being a founding member of the Freedom House in Roxbury. She was also part of the local NAACP branch in Massachusetts. Moseley also assisted with voting rights' and registration campaigns in Selma, Alabama in 1965 and served as Massachusetts legislative chair for the Women's International League for Peace and Freedom (WILPF).

In the 1960s she moved to Cape Cod and worked to start the local chapters of the NAACP and the WILPF in Cape Cod, as well as starting the Community Action Committee of Cape Cod and the Fair Housing Committee of Cape Cod. She was active in the Unitarian Universalist Church. In 1962, when the Arkansas White Citizens Council organized a "Reverse Freedom Ride", sending black families North to Hyannis, the town of the Kennedy summer home, Moseley was tasked with meeting the buses and organizing food, housing, and hospitality for the families, ultimately working to find jobs and stable housing for the families that remained.

The WILPF created the Margaret Moseley Memorial Peace Education fund in 1989. The Margaret Moseley Cooperative, focused on housing for families, was launched in October, 2016 in Roxbury.

In 2023, she was recognized as one of "Boston’s most admired, beloved, and successful Black Women leaders" by the Black Women Lead project.
