= Samantha Downing =

American writer

Samantha Downing is an American author of thriller novels.

== Career ==
Downing was born in California and has spent time in New Orleans. She is currently based in the San Francisco Bay Area.

Downing was a hobbyist writer until a friend sent a copy of Downing's manuscript of My Lovely Wife, a psychological thriller, to a literary editor. Following the book's release and success, Amazon Studios acquired its film rights, in partnership with Nicole Kidman's production company, Blossom Films.

Downing's second book, He Started It, was released in 2020 and quickly became an international bestseller. Her third book, For Your Own Good, published in the U.S. on July 20, 2021, became an instant hit on the USA Today bestseller list.

On July 18, 2023, A Twisted Love Story, was released in the United States. According to The Nerd Daily, it is "a daring and delightful thriller about a young couple that gives a whole new meaning to the dangers of modern dating".
