= The Hour of Peril =

2013 book by Daniel Stashower

The Hour of Peril: The Secret Plot to Murder Lincoln Before the Civil War
- First edition
- Author: Daniel Stashower
- Genre: Crime, Non-fiction, Military History Civil War
- Published: 2013
- Publisher: Minotaur Books
- Pages: 368
- Awards: Agatha Award for Best Nonfiction Book (2013), Macavity Award for Best Nonfiction (2014), Anthony Award for Best Critical or Non-fiction Work (2014), Edgar Award for Best Fact Crime (2014)
- ISBN: 978-0-312-60022-8
- Website: The Hour of Peril

The Hour of Peril: The Secret Plot to Murder Lincoln Before the Civil War is a book by Daniel Stashower published by Minotaur Books on 29 January 2013 & later won 4 literary awards.

== Awards ==
Year	Name	Category
2013	Agatha Award	Best Non-fiction
2014	Macavity Award	Best Non-fiction
2014	Anthony Award	Best Non-fiction
2014	Edgar Award	Best Fact Crime
