= William H. Hallahan =

American novelist

William Henry Hallahan III (December 12, 1925 – August 21, 2018) was an American novelist. He is best known for his work in the mystery, suspense and occult fields, and won an Edgar Award in the mystery genre.

== Personal life ==
Hallahan was born on December 12, 1925, in Brooklyn, New York, to William H. Hallahan Jr., and Berenice E. Lyons, the third child in a family of six boys and one girl. He served in the US Navy in World War II as a radioman second class in Natal, Brazil. He attended Temple University on the GI Bill, and graduated with a B.S. in Journalism and an M.A. in English.

Hallahan had a writing career that spanned seven decades. His first job was with Temple University, as a college English instructor, but he soon left to start his business career as a writer and editor of the Boot and Shoe Recorder at Chilton Publications. In 1957, he entered the advertising world as a copywriter for M. Russell Berger, a small Philadelphia advertising agency. After a brief stint there, he joined the international ad agency N.W. Ayer, then headquartered in Philadelphia, as copy chief, where he worked on accounts such as United Airlines, the Plymouth Division of Chrysler and other similar clients.

In 1968, Hallahan was sent to the Detroit offices of N.W. Ayer as part of a team to try to save the Plymouth account from leaving N.W. Ayer. The account nonetheless left, and Hallahan joined an ad agency that became Garceau, Hallahan and McCollough. At the same time, he also began to conduct a mail-order copy writing course.

Hallahan began to turn his focus on writing a novel. In early 1971 his wife Marion sent his first novel The Dead of Winter to a literary agent; the book was published in 1972.

== Writing career ==
Hallahan published over twelve books in the mystery, occult and non-fiction genres. His first novel, The Dead of Winter, was nominated by the Mystery Writers of America for the Edgar Allan Poe Award for Best First Mystery, and his fourth novel, Catch Me: Kill Me, was nominated and won the Edgar Allan Poe Award for Best Novel in 1978. His third novel, The Search for Joseph Tully, was a New York Times Bestseller and hailed as one of the most frightening books of all time. For the book opening, mock gravestones that read “Here Lies Joseph Tully” were lined up and down Park Avenue in New York.

His series character Charlie Brewer, the fallen but philosophical CIA spy, first appeared in the Edgar award-winning Catch Me: Kill Me, and continued as the protagonist in The Trade, Foxcatcher and Tripletrap.

Hallahan also was a writer of popular works in history, including his acclaimed work Misfire and his two Revolutionary War books: The Day The Revolution Began: 19 April 1775 and The Day The Revolution Ended.

== Selected works ==
=== Mysteries ===
- The Dead of Winter – Nominated for Edgar Allan Poe award for Best First Mystery Novel
- The Ross Forgery

=== Charlie Brewer series ===
- Catch Me: Kill Me – Winner, Edgar Allan Poe Award for Best Mystery Novel. The first in the Charlie Brewer series
- The Trade
- Foxcatcher
- Tripletrap
- The Baltimore Game (unpublished)

=== Occult ===
- The Search for Joseph Tully
- The Monk
- Keeper of the Children

=== Non-fiction ===
- Misfire
- The Day the Revolution Began
- The Day the Revolution Ended

=== Short stories ===
- The New Tenant, Modern Masters of Horror
- Meet Me at the Grave, Solved 1992

=== Essays and articles ===
- I Knew I Couldn't Win, 1981 Edgar Allan Poe Awards Dinner: Mystery Writers Annual – Special Edgar Award Winners Issue, page 14
- The Making of a Suspense Novelist, The Writer Magazine, March 1982
