= Erin E. Adams =

American author

- Born: Johnstown, Pennsylvania
- Education: Brown University
- Occupations: author, playwright, actor
- Notable work: Jackal
- Awards: 2020 New Light New Voices award from the New Light Theater Project

Erin E. Adams is an American author, playwright, and actor. A first-generation Haitian American writer, she is most well known for her debut novel Jackal (2022), a horror thriller set in her hometown of Johnstown, Pennsylvania. Adams is also a dramatist and writer for theater. Her work often explores issues of race, class, and identity through the lens of horror.

== Early life and education ==
Adams grew up in Johnstown, Pennsylvania, where she was one of only a few Black students in her school. Adams received her Bachelor of Arts with honors in Literary Arts from Brown University, and went on to a Master of Fine Arts in Acting from the Old Globe/University of San Diego Shiley Graduate Theatre Program, as well as completing an M.F.A. in Dramatic Writing from New York University’s Tisch School of the Arts. She is a first-generation Haitian American; her parents immigrated from Haiti. She draws from this heritage for some of the cultural elements in her writing.

== Writing career ==
In October 2022, Adams' play Ink'dWell was performed Off-Broadway. It won the 2020 New Light New Voices award from the New Light Theater Project.

Adams's debut novel, Jackal, was published by Bantam Books in October 2022. Jackal is a horror-thriller that combines mystery with supernatural folklore and social issues. The novel’s premise was influenced by Adams' belief that missing Black girls are not treated seriously enough by police. This is based on her observations while growing up in a small town.

Her short fiction has been included in genre anthologies, including Out There Screaming (2023), a horror collection edited by Jordan Peele, and The Black Girl Survives in This One, a young adult horror anthology centered on Black female protagonists.

Adams’s second novel, titled One of You, is slated for publication by Penguin Random House in 2027. Like her debut, One of You is expected to explore themes of cultural identity and hidden darkness, as it follows a Haitian American family confronting sinister forces.

=== Themes and style ===
Adams’s writing falls into the realm of horror, particularly the subgenre often termed "social horror". In interviews, Adams has said she makes a deliberate effort to center Black characters and African diaspora themes in her work. She has said she aims to portray Black women with complexity and humanity, pushing back against common horror tropes that often cast Black characters as either expendable victims or invincible figures.

A recurring focus in Adams’s fiction is the experience of being Black in predominantly white spaces, and the way social structures or histories can themselves be sources of horror. She has noted that the horror genre allows her to "bring the dark to light" and tackle subjects that might otherwise be unspeakable. In Jackal, Adams uses a suspenseful horror narrative to examine the issue of Black girls going missing and the lack of attention such cases tend to receive. Across her works, she incorporates folklore, local legends, and cultural history with contemporary social commentary, creating stories that explore race and power dynamics.

== Jackal (2022) ==
Jackal is Adams’s debut novel, a horror thriller published on October 4, 2022 by Bantam Books. It blends elements of crime mystery, folk horror, and social commentary. The story was largely inspired by Adams’s own upbringing and the real-world disparity in attention to missing persons cases based on race. In tone, the first half of Jackal unfolds like a suspenseful crime investigation as Liz pieces together clues. Gradually, the story shifts into a more overt horror mode as the mythic threat in the woods proves to be real. Jackal appeared on several "best of the year" lists and got nominations for genre awards including the Edgar Award and the Bram Stoker Award for Best First Novel.

=== Plot ===
The novel follows Liz Rocher, a young Black woman who returns reluctantly to her predominantly white hometown of Johnstown, Pennsylvania, to attend her best friend’s wedding. During the outdoor reception, Liz’s best friend’s daughter, Caroline, goes missing in the adjacent woods. Years earlier, when Liz was in high school, her Black classmate Keisha Woodson disappeared in the same woods and was later found dead with her heart removed from her chest. As the community searches for Caroline, Liz learns that similar disappearances have occurred in Johnstown over the years. Black girls have been vanishing in the woods around the town for decades, often on summer nights during local events, explained away as runaways, accidents, or animal attacks. Determined to save Caroline and uncover the truth, Liz researches Johnstown’s history and speaks with families of the missing girls. She discovers an eerie folktale passed among Black residents, that an entity in the forest preys on those who stray too far into it. Liz confronts this evil force - and the complicit human hostility behind it - in order to rescue Caroline and put an end to the cycle of violence.

=== Themes ===
As a horror novel, Jackal doubles as a social commentary on racial injustice and communal guilt. A central theme in the book is the phenomenon of missing Black girls whose cases are downplayed or ignored by authorities and media. The novel explores how Black individuals in such predominantly white, insular communities often feel pressure to assimilate or stay silent in order to survive. The narrative also addresses generational trauma, suggesting that the violence perpetrated against marginalized communities can linger and manifest in new forms. For example, one critic argued that the monster in the forest can be seen as both a literal creature and an embodiment of the town’s collective sins - the "monsters" created by fear, hatred, and complicity.

Johnstown’s entrenched racism and class stratification form the background of the story’s conflict. The story incorporates actual historical events such as the Johnstown Flood of 1889 (which devastated the town’s poor and Black neighborhoods) and a 1923 incident in which Black residents were driven out of the area. Adams also employs folk horror elements, such as ritualistic settings (a summer solstice bonfire in the woods), rhyme and legend, and the specter of a shape-shifting creature, to underscore the novel’s exploration of community evil. A review in AP News compared the novel's blend of suspense, racial commentary, and occult horror to Jordan Peele’s film Get Out.
