= Martha Conway =

American author

Martha Conway (born 1964) is an American author known for historical fiction novels. Her book Thieving Forest won the North American Book Award for Historical Fictions in 2014, The Underground River was awarded an Editors Choice Award by the New York Times Book Review, and 12 Bliss Street was nominated for an Edgar Award.

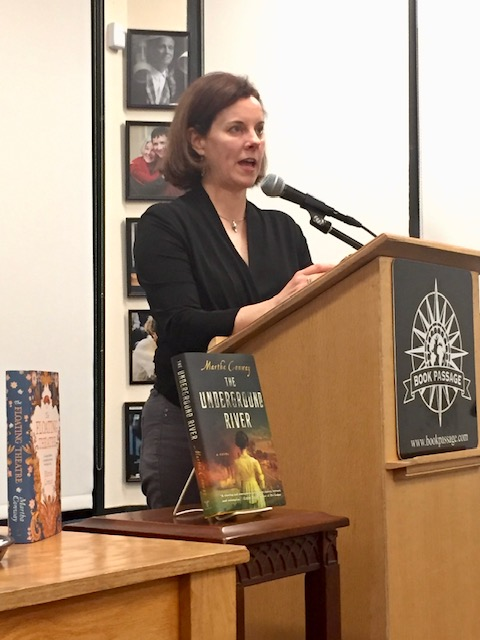
Author Martha Conway speaking at Book Passage bookstore.

== Biography ==
Conway was born in 1964 in Cleveland, Ohio, as the sixth out of seven sisters. She wrote the trilogy The Underground River, Thieving Forest, and The Physician's Daughter. Conway's short fictions has been published in The Quarterly, Massachusetts Review, Carolina Quarterly, Iowa Review, etc. In 2017, she appeared on CBS to discuss her novel, The Underground River. She resides in San Francisco, where she teaches creative writing at Stanford University's Continuing Studies Program.

== Bibliography ==
- 12 Bliss Street (2003)
- Thieving Forest (2014)
- Sugarland (2016)
- The Underground River (2017)
- The Physician's Daughter (2022)
