= Tony Fennelly =

American writer

Tony Fennelly (born November 25, 1945) is an American writer of mystery fiction.

== Life and career ==
A native of Orange, New Jersey, Fennelly graduated from the University of New Orleans after working variously as a bartender, topless dancer, and stripper; she then went to work for the Department of Welfare, which provided material for some of her work. Her novels, which feature gay furniture store owner and former lawyer Matthew "Matty" Sinclair, are set in New Orleans. Her first novel, The Glory Hole Murders, was nominated for an Edgar Award; it has found more popularity in Europe than in the United States, as have her other works. Other novels feature columnist Margo Fortier, formerly a stripper, as their heroine.

== Works ==
=== Matty Sinclair novels ===
- The Glory Hole Murders (1985)
- The Closet Hanging (1987)
- Kiss Yourself Goodbye (1989)

=== Margo Fortier novels ===
- The Hippie in the Wall (1994)
- Cherry (1993)
- 1-900-Dead (1997)
- Don't Blame the Snake (1999)
- Home Dead for Christmas (2000)
