= Rebecca Pawel =

American novelist

- Born: New York City
- Education: Columbia University (BA, MA)
- Occupations: Novelist, teacher
- Writing career
- Genres: historical, mystery, crime
- Notable awards: Edgar Allan Poe Award for Best First Novel (2004)
- Website: www.rebeccapawel.com

Rebecca Pawel (born 1977, New York City) is an American high school teacher and author of mystery novels. She is most notable for her series of historical novels set in Francoist Spain, starring Carlos Tejada Alonso y León, a staunchly anti-Communist officer in the Guardia Civil.

== Biography ==
Pawel began to develop an interest in the Iberian Peninsula while studying flamenco and classical Spanish dance in junior high school. She graduated from Stuyvesant High School in 1995, where she furthered her interest in Spain during a school trip to Madrid. In her undergraduate studies at Columbia University she majored in Spanish-language literature, with a concentration in the literature of the Iberian Peninsula. She received her master's from Teachers College in 2000.

Pawel has asserted she never intended to write mysteries, and came upon the idea almost by accident. In the summer of 2000, while on vacation in Spain, Pawel sent an e-mail to her college professor, Persephone Braham, asking if she could pick her up anything while she was there. Braham requested she bring back some murder mysteries set in Madrid. When Pawel confessed she couldn't think of any such mysteries, but that a mystery set in the Spanish capital after the Nationalist's siege would be a great idea, Braham suggested Pawel go ahead and write it. Eight weeks later, Pawel completed the manuscript for Death of a Nationalist.

At age 24, Pawel was signed by Soho Press, a publisher of mysteries set in exotic locations, on the strength of her first two manuscripts, Death of a Nationalist and Law of Return.

In 2004, Death of a Nationalist won the Edgar Award for "Best First Novel". It was also nominated for the Macavity Award at Bouchercon, and was a finalist for the LA Times Book Prize. Death of a Nationalist was originally conceived as a stand-alone mystery, but became the foundation for an entire series of novels centered around the character of Carlos Tejada Alonso y León.

The first Spanish-language edition of Death of a Nationalist appeared in 2005.

Pawel teaches English at The High School for Enterprise, Business and Technology in Williamsburg, Brooklyn.

She recently finished the first draft of an as-yet untitled novel set in Renaissance Flanders in 1577.

== Influences ==
Pawel is an admirer of the works of Ellis Peters, Dorothy Sayers and Terry Pratchett, the latter of whom she has called "a genius" and her "gold standard for writing".

She has also mentioned several other influences specific to the "Tejada" series, such as Delano Ames' The Man in the Tricorn Hat, and Carmen Martín Gaite's El cuarto de atrás (aka The Back Room).

== Bibliography ==
- Death of a Nationalist (2003)
- Law of Return (2004)
- The Watcher in the Pine (2005)
- The Summer Snow (2006)
