= Kimberly McCreight =

American author

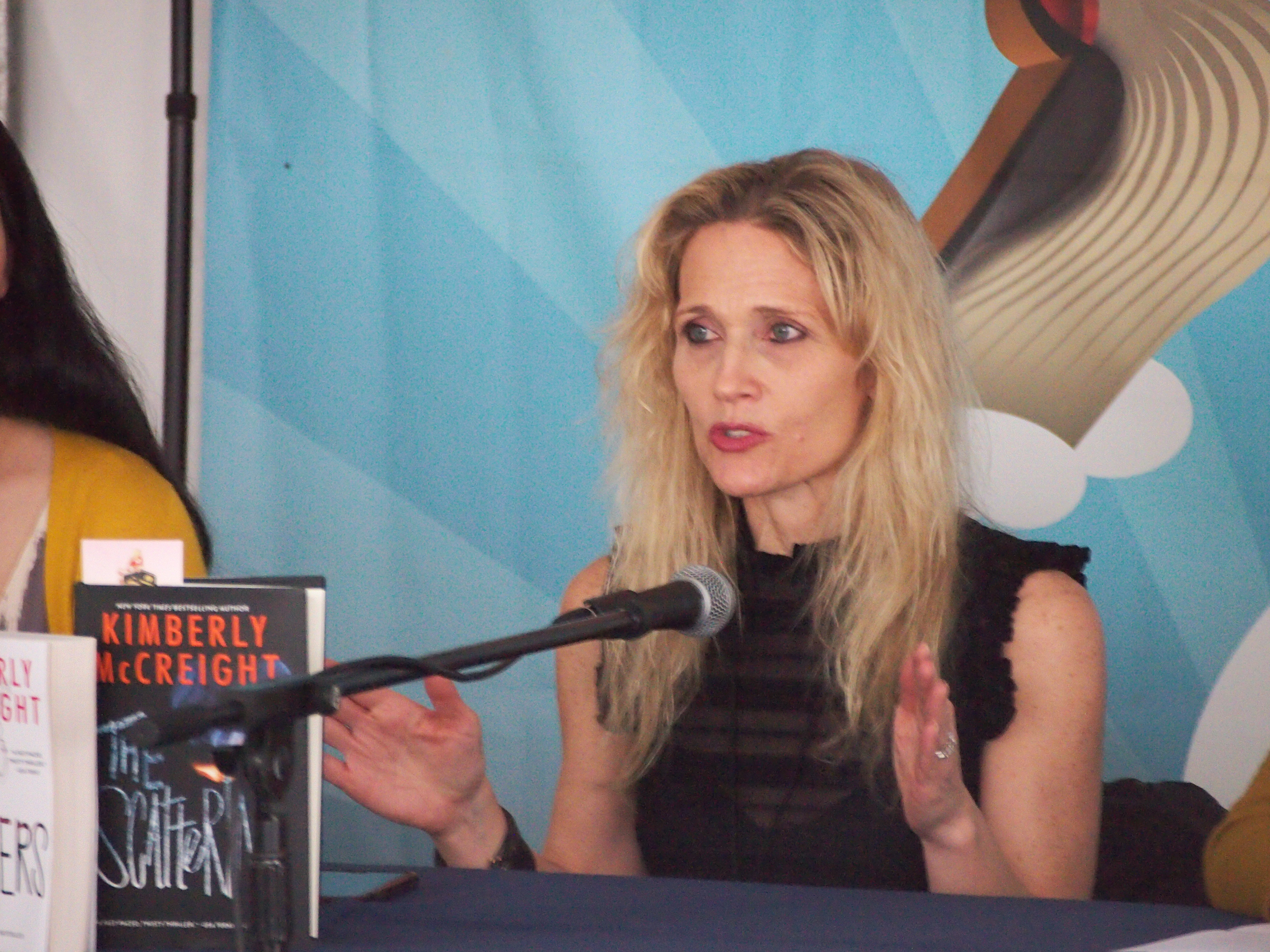
- Education: Vassar College, University of Pennsylvania Law School
- Occupation: Novelist
- Writing career
- Language: English
- Genre: novel
- Notable work: Reconstructing Amelia
- Website: www.kimberlymccreight.com

Kimberly McCreight is an American author. Her debut novel, Reconstructing Amelia, was a New York Times bestseller that was nominated for the Edgar, Anthony, and Alex Awards. It was also named Entertainment Weekly’s Favorite Book of the Year. Reconstructing Amelia has been optioned for TV by HBO and Blossom Films.

McCreight’s second adult novel, Where They Found Her, was a USA Today bestseller and a Kirkus Best Mystery of the Year. Her third novel, A Good Marriage, was named a Best Book of the Summer by the New York Times, People, and Publishers Weekly. It was also an Amazon Best Mystery of the Month. Amazon will adapt A Good Marriage for TV. Friends Like These is McCreight’s fourth adult novel. It was named a Good Morning America Buzz Pick and an Amazon Best Book of the Month. It will be adapted for TV by Amblin Television.

McCreight is also the author of The New York Times bestselling young adult trilogy The Outliers (The Outliers, The Scattering, and The Collide), optioned for film by Lionsgate.

== Biography ==
McCreight attended Vassar College and graduated cum laude from the University of Pennsylvania Law School. Before becoming a writer, she worked as a lawyer for many years, including a stint at Paul, Weiss, Rifkind, Wharton & Garrison. She has two daughters and lives in Brooklyn, New York.

== Bibliography ==
- Reconstructing Amelia (2013, Harper)
- Where They Found Her (2015, Harper)
- A Good Marriage (2020, Harper)
- Friends Like These (2021, Harper)

=== The Outliers Trilogy ===
1. The Outliers (2016, HarperCollins)
2. The Scattering (2017, HarperCollins)
3. The Collide (2018, HarperCollins)

=== Short stories ===
- "Clara's Room, A Flash Fiction Short" (2013, Simon & Schuster UK, Reflections Literary Journal Volume VI)
- "Over the Neva", The Antietam Review
- "Café Idiot", Oxford Magazine, Volume XVII
