= Reconstructing Amelia =

Novel

- First edition hardback cover (US)
- Author: Kimberly McCreight
- Audio read by: Khristine Hvam
- Language: English
- Publisher: Harper, 2
- Publication date: 2013
- Publication place: United States
- Media type: Print (hardback, paperback), e-book, audiobook
- Pages: 400 pages, first edition
- ISBN: 9781483005393 First edition US hardback
- OCLC: 939641350
- Followed by: Where They Found Her

Reconstructing Amelia is the 2013 debut novel of American author Kimberly McCreight. It was first published in hardback in the United States on April 2, 2013, through Harper and received a paperback release on December 3 of the same year. An audiobook edition narrated by Khristine Hvam was released the following year through HarperCollins Audio and Blackstone Audio. McCreight did not write the book with a specific age group in mind and after completing the work commented to a friend that she "might have written an adult-YA crossover." The novel is told through three alternating points of view, that of fifteen year old Amelia Baron, her single mother, Kate, and an anonymous blog called gRaCeFULLY.

Film rights for the novel have been optioned by Nicole Kidman's production company Blossom Films, with Kidman set to star as the character Kate and serve as an executive producer.

== Synopsis ==
The book begins with Kate discovering that her daughter Amelia, a hard working honor student, has been placed on academic probation after she was caught plagiarizing a paper on Virginia Woolf, Amelia's favorite author. She's asked to pick Amelia up and promises to be at the school, Grace Hall, in twenty minutes, but runs late because of the demands of her job as a lawyer and associate partner at a prestigious law firm. Once at Grace Hall Kate is horrified to discover that her daughter has committed suicide by jumping off the roof and spends the following days in a haze. She eventually returns to work to resume her life, but is stunned when she receives a text saying that Amelia didn't commit suicide. This causes Kate to investigate her daughter's death with the help of an officer named Lew and discover that the text is correct - Amelia did not commit suicide. Further investigation shows that Amelia was also innocent of plagiarism and that the true paper was swapped out with another one as an act of bullying.

Through Amelia's narrations and Kate's investigations the reader discovers that Amelia was recruited into the Magpies or "Maggies", a secret society that required her to perform several acts as part of a hazing ritual, which includes taking suggestive photographs in her underwear. She keeps all of this secret from Kate and her best friend Sylvia, especially as Amelia and Sylvia had mutually pledged to not join the Maggies unless both were invited. Prior to this Amelia had told her everything, including her online friendship with Ben, a gay teenager who began texting her earlier that year. As a result Amelia is also initially unable to tell Sylvia about her lesbian relationship with a fellow member named Dylan, the animosity that is directed at her by the Maggie leader Zadie, or evidence of Sylvia's boyfriend Ian cheating on her with another woman. Amelia's relationship with Dylan and her membership with the Maggies ends after Zadie enters Amelia's home and discovers the two together, after which point Zadie begins encouraging the other Maggies to bully Amelia. She's told not to tell anyone or the group will do something to hurt Sylvia. She eventually confides in the school counselor, who successfully encourages her to talk to Sylvia. Sylvia is initially resentful that Amelia lied to her, especially as she is so upset over Ian's cheating, but is supportive of her friend. The two write a letter to Dylan asking for explanation, only for Zadie to send it to the entire school, outing her as a lesbian. She's brought into the office by Grace Hall's headmaster Phillip Woodhouse in an attempt to get her to tell him everything about the Maggies, as he had been trying to get rid of the school's secret societies. Amelia chooses not to say anything because she's afraid of what the group will do to Dylan, because while Woodhouse might be able to protect Sylvia he would be unable to protect Dylan.

It is also revealed that Ben is actually Kate's boss Jeremy, Amelia's biological father. She and Jeremy had previously had a one night stand years earlier while Kate was interning at his company, however Kate had mistakenly thought that the true father was Daniel, a fellow student, but had told no one about who she believed the father was. Jeremy had realized that Amelia was his daughter after she showed signs of Waardenburg syndrome, which runs in his family. Kate is initially led to believe that Amelia was pushed by Zadie and confronts the girl at her home, only to discover that not only was Zadie not responsible for Amelia's fall but that Zadie's mother Adele had made her recruit Amelia and that Zadie was conceived during an affair Adele had with Jeremy. Ultimately Kate discovers the truth behind Amelia's death - she was accidentally pushed off by Sylvia during an argument, as the Maggies had sent her a text that implied that Amelia had been having sex with Ian. The book ends with Kate beginning to come to terms with her grief, Zadie getting sent to a school for troubled girls, and the disbanding of the secret societies forever.

== Reception ==
Since its release Reconstructing Amelia has received positive reviews and drawn comparisons to Gillian Flynn's 2012 novel Gone Girl and the works of Jodi Picoult. The Pittsburgh Post-Gazette and Publishers Weekly both reviewed the work, with the latter stating that "Fans of literary thrillers will enjoy the novel’s dark mood and clever form, even if the mystery doesn’t entirely hold together." Of comparisons to Flynn's work, Entertainment Weekly felt that the book was "this year’s Gone Girl" while the New York Journal of Books felt that it more closely resembled "Megan Abbott's Dare Me or Carol Goodwin’s [sic] Arcadia Falls".
