= Daniel Stashower =

American author and editor of mystery fiction and historical nonfiction

Daniel Stashower is an American author and editor of mystery fiction and historical nonfiction. He lives in Maryland.

== Awards and honors ==
Stashower has received awards and recognition for several of his works.

=== Fiction ===
The mystery novel The Adventure of the Ectoplasmic Man was a 1986 Edgar Award nominee for best first novel.

The short story "A Deliberate Form of Frenzy" was nominated for the 1998 Agatha Award for best short story.

=== Nonfiction ===
Teller of Tales: The Life of Arthur Conan Doyle was the 1999 Agatha Award winner for best nonfiction, the 2000 Edgar Award winner for best critical/biographical work, a 2000 Anthony Award nominee for best critical nonfiction work, and a 2000 Macavity Award nominee for best nonfiction.

The Beautiful Cigar Girl was a 2006 Agatha Award nominee for best nonfiction and a 2007 Edgar Award nominee for best fact crime.

Arthur Conan Doyle: A Life in Letters was the 2007 Agatha Award winner for best nonfiction, the 2008 Edgar Award winner for best critical/biographical work, and the 2008 Anthony Award winner for best critical work.

The Hour of Peril was the 2013 Agatha Award winner for best nonfiction, the 2014 Edgar Award winner for best fact crime, a 2014 Anthony Award nominee for best critical or nonfiction work, was a New York Times best seller and editors' choice, and was on the Washington Post's list of Notable Nonfiction of 2013.

== Books ==
=== Fiction ===
- Stashower, Daniel (1985). The Adventure of the Ectoplasmic Man. William Morrow and Company.
- Stashower, Daniel (1989). Elephants in the Distance. William Morrow.
- Stashower, Daniel (1998). "A Deliberate Form of Frenzy". In Foxwell, Elizabeth (ed.). Malice Domestic 7. Avon Books.
- Stashower, Daniel (1999). The Dime Museum Murders: A Harry Houdini Mystery. Avon Books. ISBN 978-0-380-80056-8.
- Stashower, Daniel (2000). The Floating Lady Murder: A Harry Houdini Mystery. Avon Books. ISBN 978-0-380-80057-5.
- Stashower, Daniel (2001). The Houdini Specter: A Harry Houdini Mystery. Avon Books.
- Greenberg, Martin H.; Lellenberg, Jon; Stashower, Daniel, eds. (2002). Murder in Baker Street: New Tales of Sherlock Holmes. Carroll & Graf. ISBN 978-0-7867-0898-7.
- Greenberg, Martin H.; Lellenberg, Jon; Stashower, Daniel, eds. (2002). Murder, My Dear Watson: New Tales of Sherlock Holmes. Carroll & Graf.
- Greenberg, Martin H.; Lellenberg, Jon; Stashower, Daniel, eds. (2006). Ghosts in Baker Street: New Tales of Sherlock Holmes. Carroll & Graf.
- Greenberg, Martin H.; Lellenberg, Jon; Stashower, Daniel, eds. (2009). Sherlock Holmes in America. Skyhorse Publishing. ISBN 978-1-60239-352-3.
- Doyle, Arthur Conan (2011). Lellenberg, Jon; Stashower, Daniel; Foss, Rachel (eds.). The Narrative of John Smith. British Library.

==== Anthologies ====
- Meanwhile, Far Across the Caspian Sea ... (Aug 2010) in Death's Excellent Vacation

=== Nonfiction ===
- Stashower, Daniel (1999). Teller of Tales: The Life of Arthur Conan Doyle. Henry Holt & Co. ISBN 978-0-8050-5074-5.
- Stashower, Daniel (2002). The Boy Genius and the Mogul: The Untold Story of Television. Broadway Books. ISBN 978-0-7679-0759-0.
- Stashower, Daniel (2006). The Beautiful Cigar Girl: Mary Rogers, Edgar Allan Poe, and the Invention of Murder. Dutton. ISBN 978-0-525-94981-7.
- Lellenberg, Jon; Stashower, Daniel; Foley, Charles, eds. (2007). Arthur Conan Doyle: A Life in Letters. Penguin.
- Doyle, Arthur Conan (2012). Lellenberg, Jon; Stashower, Daniel (eds.). Dangerous Work: Diary of an Arctic Adventure. University of Chicago Press.
- Stashower, Daniel (2013). The Hour of Peril: The Secret Plot to Murder Lincoln Before the Civil War. Minotaur Books.
