= John Lantigua =

American journalist

John Lantigua is an American journalist and crime novelist. His journalism awards include the Pulitzer Prize, 1999, for work on voter fraud while at The Miami Herald; the Robert F. Kennedy Journalism Award, 2004 and 2006, and the National Hispanic Journalists Award for Investigative Reporting, 2004 and 2006, for work on immigration issues while writing for The Palm Beach Post. Lantigua is also the author of seven novels, including the a crime series starring Willie Cuesta, a Cuban American private investigator based in Miami.

== Early life ==
John Lantigua was born in 1947 in the Bronx to Spanish-speaking parents. His mother was from Adjuntas, Puerto Rico, and his father from Matanzas, Cuba. When Lantigua was four years old, his family moved to Ridgewood, New Jersey, where he learned to speak English. He now has one son and two daughters, Edwina, Ana and Douglas Lantigua. John has three grandchildren: Ella Lantigua, Lela Lantigua, and Clyde Cisneros.

== Career ==
Lantigua began his journalism career at The Hartford Courant, the largest newspaper in Connecticut, at age 21. He covered Hartford's large Puerto Rican and Black populations for three years. At age 25, he moved to Oaxaca, Mexico where for two years he worked as a mountain guide in the Sierra Madre, leading camping trips. He later lived two years in the city of Oaxaca where he taught English and theater and was a member of El Grupo Rodolfo Alvarez, the city's municipal theater company.

In 1982, Lantigua returned to journalism, working for United Press International in Honduras, 1982–83, and later Nicaragua, 1983–84, before reporting for The Washington Post and other publications from Nicaragua in 1984–85. Lantigua reported on the Contra War in Nicaragua and also wrote from El Salvador and Costa Rica. From 1993 to 1998, Lantigua worked for The Miami Herald where he was a general assignment reporter. He also formed part of the investigative team that won the Pulitzer Prize for Investigative Reporting for its coverage of corruption in the 1997 Miami mayoral election. From 1999 to 2002, Lantigua freelanced, covering the Elian Gonzalez affair in Miami for Salon; the Bush-Gore election controversy for The Nation; and the 9/11 terrorists' presence in Florida for Newsweek. In 2002, he joined The Palm Beach Post as a Miami-based reporter, specializing in immigration. His account of being smuggled across the Arizona desert and across the country to Florida formed part of a series of articles written by an investigative team that won the Kennedy Award, the National Hispanic Journalists Award and the Harry Chapin World Hunger Year Prize in 2004. That team also produced a series in 2005 about birth defects and other injuries caused by pesticides, largely among immigrant field hands in Florida, which again won the Kennedy and Hispanic Journalists awards in 2006. That reporting led to changes in laws governing the use of pesticides.

Since 2017, Lantigua has been an investigative journalist for the American Civil Liberties (ACLU) Union of Florida.

== Publications ==
Lantigua's novel "The Lady from Buenos Aires," Arte Publico, 2007, about the children of the disappeared in Argentina, won the International Latino Book Award for Mystery, 2008, and his novel "On Hallowed Ground," Arte Publico, 2011, about a kidnapping in the Colombian community in Miami, won the same award in 2012. His first novel, "Heat Lightning," Putnam, 1987, about killings in the Salvadoran community in San Francisco, was a finalist for best first novel at the Edgar Allan Poe Award for Best First Novel. Lantigua's time at the Miami Herald inspired him to start the Willie Cuesta series:

1. Player's Vendetta (1999)
2. The Ultimate Havana (2001)
3. The Lady from Buenos Aires (2007)
4. On Hallowed Ground (2011)

=== Novellas ===
- The Jungle (2017)
- The Lovers of Traber (2017)

=== Stand-alone Novels ===
- Heat Lightning (1987)
- Burn Season (1989)
- Twister (1992)

=== Non-fiction ===
- Smuggled Across the Mexican-U.S. Border (2017)
