= Bouchercon XLII =

2011 mystery and detective fiction convention

- "Spirits of St. Louis"
- Date: September 15, 2011
- Location: Saint Louis, Missouri
- Country: USA
- Hosted by: Jon Jordan, David Thompson
- Website: http://www.bcon2011.com

Bouchercon is an annual convention of creators and devotees of mystery and detective fiction. It is named in honour of writer, reviewer, and editor Anthony Boucher; also the inspiration for the Anthony Awards, which have been issued at the convention since 1986. This page details Bouchercon XLII and the 26th Anthony Awards ceremony.

== Bouchercon ==
The convention was held in the Renaissance St. Louis Grand Hotel of Saint Louis, Missouri, on September 15, 2011, and ran until September 18. The event was chaired by publisher and editors of Crimespree magazine, Jon Jordan. David Thompson, the co-owner of Houston bookstore "Murder by the Book" was also supposed to chair, however died before the event.

=== Special guests ===
- Lifetime Achievement award — Sara Paretsky
- American Guests of Honor — Robert Crais & Charlaine Harris
- International Guests of Honor — Colin Cotterill & Val McDermid
- Fan Guests of Honor — Kate Stine & Brian Skupin
- Toastmaster — Ridley Pearson
- Special Guests (local living legends) — Bob Randisi & John Lutz
- The David Thompson Memorial Special Service award — Ali Karim

== Anthony Awards ==
The following list details the awards distributed at the twenty-sixth annual Anthony Awards ceremony.

=== Novel award ===
Winner:

- Louise Penny, Bury Your Dead

Shortlist:

- Tom Franklin, Crooked Letter, Crooked Letter
- Tana French, Faithful Place
- Steve Hamilton, The Lock Artist
- Laura Lippman, I'd Know You Anywhere

=== First novel award ===
Winner:

- Hilary Davidson, Damage Done

Shortlist:

- Bruce DeSilva, Rogue Island
- Paul Doiron, The Poacher's Son
- Graham Moore, The Sherlockian
- James Thompson, Snow Angels

=== Paperback original award ===
Winner:

- Duane Swierczynski, Expiration Date

Shortlist:

- Robert Goddard, Long Time Coming
- Bryan Gruley, The Hanging Tree
- Hank Phillippi Ryan, Drive Time
- Frank Tallis, Vienna Secrets

=== Short story award ===
Winner:

- Dana Cameron, "Swing Shift", from Crimes By Moonlight: Mysteries from the Dark Side

Shortlist:

- Doug Allyn, "The Scent of Lilacs", from Ellery Queen's Mystery Magazine September / October 2010
- Chris F. Holm, "The Hitter", from Needle: A Magazine of Noir Summer
- Mary Jane Maffini, "So Much in Common", from Ellery Queen's Mystery Magazine September / October 2010
- Patricia L. Morin, "Homeless", from Mystery Montage: A Collection of Short Story Mystery Genres
- Simon Wood, "The Frame Maker", from The Back Alley Webzine

=== Critical and non-fiction award ===
Winner:

- John Curran, Agatha Christie's Secret Notebooks

Shortlist:

- Rafael Alvarez, The Wire: Truth Be Told
- Steven Doyle & David A. Crowder, Sherlock Holmes for Dummies
- Yunte Huang, Charlie Chan: The Untold Story of the Honorable Detective and His Rendezvous with American History
- David Morrell, Thrillers: 100 Must Reads

=== Graphic novel award ===
Winner:

- Jason Starr, The Chill

Shortlist:

- Jason Aaron, Scalped Vol 6: The Gnawing
- Darwyn Cooke, Richard Stark's Parker, Vol 2: The Outfit
- Joshua Hale Fialkov & Noel Tuazon, Tumor
- Denise Mina, Sickness in the Family
- Jill Thompson & Evan Dorkin, Beasts of Burden

=== Website award ===
Winner:

- Stan Ulrich & Lucinda Surber, Stop, You're Killing Me!

Shortlist:

- Jen Forbus, Jen's Book Thoughts
- J. Kingston Pierce, The Rap Sheet
- Chantelle Aimée Osman, Sirens of Suspense
- Sandra Ruttan, Spinetingler
