= Bouchercon XXXVIII =

2007 mystery and detective fiction convention

- "Bearly Alive"
- Date: September 27, 2007
- Location: Anchorage, Alaska
- Country: USA
- Hosted by: Dana Stabenow, Dee Ford, Kimberley Gray

Bouchercon is an annual convention of creators and devotees of mystery and detective fiction. It is named in honour of writer, reviewer, and editor Anthony Boucher; also the inspiration for the Anthony Awards, which have been issued at the convention since 1986. This page details Bouchercon XXXVIII and the 22nd Anthony Awards ceremony.

== Bouchercon ==
The convention was held in Anchorage, Alaska on September 27, 2007; running until the 30th. The event was chaired by authors and members of Alaska Sisters in Crime, Dana Stabenow, Dee Ford and Kimberley Gray.

=== Special Guests ===
- Lifetime Achievement award — James Sallis
- Special Guest of Honor — Diana Gabaldon
- American Guest of Honor — Thomas Perry
- Fan Guest of Honor — Barbara Peters

== Anthony Awards ==
The following list details the awards distributed at the twenty-second annual Anthony Awards ceremony.

=== Novel award ===
Winner:

- Laura Lippman, No Good Deeds

Shortlist:

- Jan Burke, Kidnapped
- Denise Mina, The Dead Hour
- Nancy Pickard, The Virgin of Small Plains
- Julia Spencer-Fleming, All Mortal Flesh

=== First novel award ===
Winner:

- Louise Penny, Still Life

Shortlist:

- John Hart, The King of Lies
- Steve Hockensmith, Holmes on the Range
- Cornelia Read, A Field of Darkness
- Alexandra Sokoloff, The Harrowing

=== Paperback original award ===
Winner:

- Dana Cameron, Ashes And Bones

Shortlist:

- Troy Cook, 47 Rules of Highly Effective Bank Robbers
- Sean Doolittle, The Cleanup
- Robert Fate, Baby Shark
- Victor Gischler, Shotgun Opera
- Naomi Hirahara, Snakeskin Shamisen
- Charlie Huston, A Dangerous Man

=== Short story award ===
Winner:

- Simon Wood, "My Father's Secret", from Working Stiffs

Shortlist:

- Megan Abbott, "Policy", from Damn Near Dead: Old, Bold, Uncontrolled
- Dana Cameron, "The Lords of Misrule", from Sugarplums And Scandal: A feast of passion and suspense for the holidays!
- Bill Crider, "Cranked", from Damn Near Dead: Old, Bold, Uncontrolled
- Toni Kelner, "Sleeping with the Plush", from Alfred Hitchcock's Mystery Magazine May 2006
- Elaine Viets, "After the Fall", from Alfred Hitchcock's Mystery Magazine January / February 2006

=== Critical / Non-fiction award ===
Winner:

- Jim Huang & Austin Lugar, Mystery Muses

Shortlist:

- Gary Warren Niebuhr, Read 'Em Their Writes
- Chris Roerden, Don't Murder your Mystery
- Daniel Stashower, The Beautiful Cigar Girl
- E. J. Wagner, The Science of Sherlock Holmes

=== Special service award ===
Winner:

- Jim Huang, Crum Creek Press and The Mystery Company

Shortlist:

- Charles Ardai, Hard Case Crime
- George Easter, Deadly Pleasures
- Jon Jordan & Ruth Jordan, Crimespree Magazine
- Lynn Kaczmarek & Chris Aldrich, Mystery News
- Ali Karim, Shots Magazine
- Barbara Franchi & Sharon Wheeler, ReviewingTheEvidence.com
- Maddy Van Hertbruggen, 4 Mystery Addicts
