= Bouchercon XLI =

2010 mystery and detective fiction convention

- "Bouchercon by the Bay"
- Date: October 14, 2010
- Location: San Francisco, California
- Country: United States
- Hosted by: Rae Helmsworth
- Website: http://www.bcon2010.com

Bouchercon is an annual convention of creators and devotees of mystery and detective fiction. It is named in honour of writer, reviewer, and editor Anthony Boucher; also the inspiration for the Anthony Awards, which have been issued at the convention since 1986. This page details Bouchercon XLI and the 25th Anthony Awards ceremony.

== Bouchercon ==
The convention was held in the Hyatt Regency San Francisco of San Francisco, California, on October 14, 2010; running until the 17th. The event was chaired by crime fiction reviewer Rae Helmsworth.

=== Special Guests ===
- Distinguished Contribution to the Genre — Lee Child
- International Guest of Honor — Denise Mina
- American Guest of Honor — Laurie R. King
- Toastmaster — Eddie Muller
- Fan Guest of Honor — Maddy Van Hertbruggen

== Anthony Awards ==
The following list details the awards distributed at the twenty-fifth annual Anthony Awards ceremony.

=== Novel award ===
Winner:

- Louise Penny, The Brutal Telling

Shortlist:

- John Hart, The Last Child
- Charlie Huston, The Mystic Arts of Erasing All Signs of Death
- Stieg Larsson, The Girl Who Played with Fire
- S. J. Rozan, The Shanghai Moon

=== First novel award ===
Winner:

- Sophie Littlefield, A Bad Day for Sorry

Shortlist:

- Alan Bradley, The Sweetness at the Bottom of the Pie
- Bryan Gruley, Starvation Lake
- Stuart Neville, The Twelve
- Stefanie Pintoff, In the Shadow of Gotham

=== Paperback original award ===
Winner:

- Bryan Gruley, Starvation Lake

Shortlist:

- Megan Abbott, Bury Me Deep
- Ken Bruen & Reed Farrel Coleman, Tower
- Max Allan Collins, Quarry in the Middle
- G. M. Malliet, Death and the Lit Chick
- Hank Phillippi Ryan, Air Time

=== Short story award ===
Winner:

- Hank Phillippi Ryan, "On the House", from Quarry: Crime Stories by New England Writers

Shortlist:

- Ace Atkins, "Last Fair Deal Gone Down", from Crossroad Blues
- Dana Cameron, "Femme Sole", from Boston Noir
- Dennis Lehane, "Animal Rescue", from Boston Noir
- Luis Alberto Urrea, "Amapola", from Phoenix Noir

=== Critical / Non-fiction award ===
Winner:

- P. D. James, Talking About Detective Fiction

Shortlist:

- Otto Penzler, The Line Up: The World's Greatest Crime Writers Tell the Inside Story of Their Greatest Detectives
- Lisa Rogak, Haunted Heart: The Life and Times of Stephen King
- Elena Santangelo, Dame Agatha's Shorts: An Agatha Christie Short Story Companion
- Joan Schenkar, The Talented Miss Highsmith: The Secret Life and Serious Art of Patricia Highsmith
