= Bouchercon XXXVI =

2005 mystery and detective fiction convention

- "Wicked Times in the windy city..."
- Date: September 1, 2005
- Location: Chicago, Illinois
- Country: USA
- Hosted by: Sonya Rice, Deen Kogan

Bouchercon is an annual convention of creators and devotees of mystery and detective fiction. It is named in honour of writer, reviewer, and editor Anthony Boucher; also the inspiration for the Anthony Awards, which have been issued at the convention since 1986. This page details Bouchercon XXXVI and the 20th Anthony Awards ceremony.

== Bouchercon ==
The convention was held in Chicago, Illinois on September 1, 2005; running until the 4th. The event was chaired by "mystery fans extraordinaire" Sonya Rice, and founder of the Society Hill playhouse, Deen Kogan.

=== Special Guests ===
- Lifetime Achievement awards — Bill Pronzini & Marcia Muller
- International Guest of Honor — Jonathan Gash
- American Guest of Honor — Dennis Lehane
- Fan Guest of Honor — Beth Fedyn
- Toastmaster — Harlan Coben

== Anthony Awards ==
The following list details the awards distributed at the twentieth annual Anthony Awards ceremony.

=== Novel award ===
Winner:

- William Kent Krueger, Blood Hollow

Shortlist:

- Ken Bruen, The Killing of the Tinkers
- John Katzenbach, The Madman's Tale
- Laura Lippman, By a Spider's Thread
- T. Jefferson Parker, California Girl
- Julia Spencer-Fleming, Out of the Deep I Cry

=== First novel award ===
Winner:

- Harley Jane Kozak, Dating Dead Men

Shortlist:

- Sandra Balzo, Uncommon Grounds
- Judy Clemens, Until the Cows Come Home
- Jilliane Hoffman, Retribution
- J. A. Konrath, Whiskey Sour

=== Paperback original award ===
Winner:

- Jason Starr, Twisted City

Shortlist:

- Robin Burcell, Cold Case
- Roberta Isleib, Putt to Death
- Susan McBride, Blue Blood
- M. J. Rose, The Halo Effect

=== Short story award ===
Winner:

- Elaine Viets, "Wedding Knife", from Chesapeake Crimes

Shortlist:

- Rhys Bowen, "Voodoo", from Alfred Hitchcock's Mystery Magazine November 2004
- Terence Faherty, "The Widow of Slane", from Ellery Queen's Mystery Magazine March / April 2004
- Ted Hertel Jr., "It's Crackers to Slip a Rozzer the Dropsy in Snide", from Small Crimes
- Arthur Nersesian, "Hunter/Trapper", from Brooklyn Noir

=== Critical / Non-fiction award ===
Winner:

- Max Allan Collins, Men's Adventure Magazines

Shortlist:

- Frankie Bailey & Steven Chermak, Famous American Crimes & Trials
- Edward Conlon, Blue Blood
- Leslie S. Klinger, The New Annotated Sherlock Holmes
- Julian Rubinstein, The Ballad of the Whiskey Robber

=== Cover art award ===
Winner:

- Sohrab Habibion; for Tim McLoughlin, Brooklyn Noir

Shortlist:

- Gregory Manchess; for Max Phillips, Fade to Blonde
- Sal Barracca; for J. A. Konrath, Whiskey Sour
- Robert Santora; for Ruth Francisco, Good Morning, Darkness
- Michael Kellner; for Gary Phillips, Monkology
