= The Cruelest Month =

Canadian mystery novel

- Paperback cover art for The Cruelest Month
- Author: Louise Penny
- Audio read by: Ralph Cosham
- Original title: The Cruellest Month
- Illustrator: Rob Wood
- Language: English
- Series: Chief Inspector Armand Gamache
- Genre: Mystery, crime novel
- Publisher: Headline (UK); St. Martin's Press (US)
- Publication date: August 1, 2007 (UK); March 4, 2008 (US)
- Publication place: United Kingdom; United States; Canada?
- Media type: Print, ebook, audiobook
- Pages: 320 pp. (first edition, hardcover)
- ISBN: 9780755328956 (hardcover 1st UK ed.)
- Preceded by: A Fatal Grace
- Followed by: A Rule Against Murder

The Cruelest Month, by Louise Penny, is the third novel in the Three Pines Mysteries series, which features Chief Inspector Armand Gamache, published in 2007 and 2008.

In December 2022, the novel was adapted to streaming television at Amazon Prime Video as the two-part second arc of Three Pines, starring Alfred Molina, written by Jamie Crichton and directed by Tracey Deer.

== Plot summary ==
The novel, set in the small Canadian town of Three Pines, takes place around the Easter season. A group of friends visits a haunted house, hoping to rid it of the evil spirits that have haunted it, and the village, for decades. One of them ends up dead, apparently of fright. Chief Inspector Armand Gamache and his team from the Sûreté du Québec investigate the old house and the villagers of Three Pines.

== Awards and recognition ==
The Cruelest Month was the recipient of the Agatha Award for best mystery novel of 2008.

It was also nominated for the Anthony Award, the Macavity Award and the Barry Award for best crime novel of 2008.

== Adaptation ==
In December 2022, the novel was adapted as the two-part episode of the same name, serving as the second arc of the mystery television series Three Pines, starring Alfred Molina as Chief Inspector Armand Gamache, written by Jamie Crichton, directed by Tracey Deer, and released to Amazon Prime Video.

== See also ==
- Chauvet Cave, France

Awards
Preceded by A Fatal Grace, Louise Penny	Agatha Award for Best Novel; 2008	Succeeded by A Brutal Telling, Louise Penny
