= A World of Curiosities =

2022 crime novel by Louise Penny

- First edition cover
- Author: Louise Penny
- Audio read by: Robert Bathurst
- Series: Chief Inspector Armand Gamache
- Genre: Detective fiction
- Set in: Quebec Province
- Publisher: Minotaur Books
- Publication place: Canada
- Pages: 400
- ISBN: 978-1-250-14529-1
- Preceded by: The Madness of Crowds

A World of Curiosities is Louise Penny's 18th novel in a series featuring the fictional character Chief Inspector Armand Gamache.

The 2022 crime mystery book follows the investigation into a series of murders in Quebec, and briefly references the real life 1989 École Polytechnique massacre.

It was well received by critics and an immediate number one best seller in the hardback fiction charts.

== Publication history ==
This is the 18th novel in a series of mystery novels featuring Chief Inspector Armand Gamache. It was published by Minotaur Books.

The novel was published in late 2022 just as Amazon Prime Video started streaming the television show Three Pines, adaptations of Penny's earlier books in the series.

== Plot introduction ==
The novel is set in the fictional Quebec village of Three Pines, and features siblings Sam and Fiona Arsenault, whose mother Clotilde was killed after subjecting them both to sexual abuse in their younger years. The book follows Sûreté du Québec detectives Armand Gamache and his deputy Jean-Guy Beauvoir. The detectives are investigating multiple homicides in the village, with clues about the killer centering around a mysterious painting.

The book provides the reader with insights into the early career of inspector Gamache.

== Critical reception ==
A World of Curiosities was an immediate best seller on the hardcover fiction charts.

Kajori Patra, writing in The Telegraph (India) described the book as dramatic, frightening and thrilling. She notes it deliberately confuses the reader, before the book's unexpectedly abrupt conclusion.

Guardian book reporter Alison Flood, wrote that "unusually for a crime novel, leaves you feeling better about the world once you’ve finished."

Globe and Mail book columnist Margaret Cannon described the book as one of the best in the series of 18, and wrote that Penny was "at the top of her game".

In 2024, the audiobook narrated by Robert Bathurst was a finalist for the Audie Award for Mystery.

== Relation to real events and persons ==
The story briefly incorporates the real life massacre that happened at the Polytechnique Montréal in 1989 and features the real life survivor Nathalie Provost.
