= Trick of the Light =

Trick of the Light may refer to:

- "Trick of the Light" (The Triffids song), 1988
- "Trick of the Light" (The Who song), 1978
- Trick of the Light (album), by Modern Romance

== See also ==
- "Tricks of the Light", 1984 song by Mike Oldfield
- A Trick of Light, 1995 film
- A Trick of the Light (novel), 2011 novel by Louise Penny
- "A Trick of the Night", 1986 single by Bananarama
