= Chief Inspector Armand Gamache =

Main character in mystery novel series by Louise Penny

Armand Gamache
- Alfred Molina as Chief Inspector Armand Gamache in the series Three Pines.
- First appearance: Still Life (2005)
- Created by: Louise Penny
- Portrayed by: Nathaniel Parker; Alfred Molina

In-universe information
- Gender: Male
- Occupation: Police detective
- Spouse: Reine-Marie Gamache
- Nationality: Canadian

Chief Inspector Armand Gamache is the main character in a series of mystery novels written by Canadian author Louise Penny. The series is set around the life of Chief Inspector Armand Gamache of Sûreté du Québec, the provincial police force for Quebec. Books in the series have been nominated for, and have received, numerous awards.

The first book in the series, Still Life, was released in 2006 and won the New Blood Dagger award, Arthur Ellis Award, the Dilys Award, 2007 Anthony Award, and the Barry Award. All subsequent novels in the series have won major crime-writing awards in three countries. Many have also made the New York Times Best-Seller List, debuting as high as #1.

== Summary ==
The Chief Inspector Armand Gamache book series is written by Louise Penny. Prior to writing full time, she worked for 20 years as a radio journalist and host for CBC Radio in Thunder Bay, Ontario and Winnipeg, Manitoba. Penny originally began writing a historical novel; however, she changed to mystery writing after finding trouble finishing. She entered the first book of the series, Still Life, in the "Debut Dagger" competition in the United Kingdom, placing second out of 800 entries.

The series revolves around the character of Chief Inspector Armand Gamache. The stories typically take place in the village of Three Pines, with Gamache investigating the murders of various people in each novel. The native French speaker Gamache speaks English with a British accent. In the first book Still Life, he is said to have learned English while he was an undergraduate at Christ's College, Cambridge, where according to A Great Reckoning he read for a degree in history.

The books have been described as "character-driven" mysteries that explore the relationships between characters with each book in the series. Three Pines is a fictional location set in the province of Quebec, with Penny setting up the characters using the history of old Canada to show their personalities and backgrounds. In the series, a few of the plots are set outside of Three Pines.

The Chief Inspector Armand Gamache book series contains little or no sex or violence and has been referred to as a kinder and gentler alternative to modern crime fiction. Penny herself stated that "The Murder Stone, like all the Gamache novels, is about love and friendship. About belonging and hope. And finding kindness buried. In the wilderness. In the marrow".

In How the Light Gets In, Penny writes that: "Armand Gamache had always held unfashionable beliefs. He believed the light would banish the shadows. That kindness was more powerful than cruelty, and that goodness existed, even in the most desperate places. He believed that evil had its limits". In many of the books from Still Life onwards Gamache tells new detectives joining his team "four sayings that can lead to wisdom": "I was wrong. I'm sorry. I don't know. I need help".

More of Gamache's approach is shared in A Better Man, when he shares with one of his colleagues advice he himself was given at the start of his career: "Before speaking ... you might want to ask yourself three questions ... Is it true? Is it kind? Does it need to be said?".

== Books ==
Cover art for Still Life, the first book in the Chief Inspector Armand Gamache book series.

There are a total of 21 books in the series, all published by Minotaur Books, an imprint of St. Martin's Press. The first book was released in 2005, in the U.S., with the most recent in 2026. There is also a short novella called The Hangman which features Inspector Gamache and is set in Three Pines. This does not form part of the series and was written as a simple story for adults learning to read English. Gamache also appears briefly as a minor character in State of Terror (2021), a political thriller co-written with Hillary Clinton.

No.	Title	Publisher	Year	ISBN
1	Still Life	Minotaur Books	2005	978-1410448972
Still Life is the debut novel in the series and introduces the character Chief Inspector Armand Gamache. The story takes place in the town of Three Pines, where one of the beloved residents, Miss Jane Neal, was shot in the heart with an arrow. Neal is an art enthusiast and retired school teacher and Gamache must investigate to solve the murder. The novel was the winner of several awards, including the New Blood Dagger award, Arthur Ellis Award, the Dilys Award, 2007 Anthony Award, and the Barry Award. This book was adapted as the 2013 television movie "Still Life - A Three Pines Mystery" starring Nathaniel Parker as Gamache and Anthony Lemke as Beauvoir.
2	A Fatal Grace (Dead Cold), Canadian title	Minotaur Books	2007	978-0312352561
Inspector Gamache investigates after CC de Poitiers, a sadistic socialite, is fatally electrocuted at a Christmas curling competition in the small Québécois town of Three Pines. CC, who had a "spiritual guidance" business based on eliminating emotion, was hated by seemingly everyone, including her husband, lover, and daughter. The crime links to a vagrant's recent murder as well as to the pasts of several other villagers. This novel was adapted into Season 1, Episodes 1&2 of Three Pines TV series.
3	The Cruelest Month	Minotaur Books	2008	978-1585366040
The novel, set in the small Canadian town of Three Pines, takes place around the Easter season. A group of friends visits a haunted house, hoping to rid it of the evil spirits that have haunted it, and the village, for decades. One of them ends up dead, apparently of fright. Chief Inspector Armand Gamache and his team from the Sûreté du Québec investigate the old house and the villagers of Three Pines. The novel also gives us more insight into a past case and its aftermath. This novel was loosely adapted into Season 1, Episodes 3&4 of Three Pines TV series.
4	A Rule Against Murder (The Murder Stone), Canadian title	Minotaur Books	2009	978-0312614164
Gamache and his wife are commemorating their wedding anniversary at Manoir Bellechasse, a historic inn near Three Pines. After solving his previous murders in the spring, fall, and winter, this book is set in a hot summer around the time of Canada Day (July 1st). Gamache and his wife are surprised by the arrival of family members for a reunion. Soon after they appear, a murder takes place when a statue falls on a family member. Despite the bloody body, the statue and its foundation have no blemishes, leaving Gamache to investigate it as a homicide. Nominated for an Arthur Ellis Award as Best Novel for 2009. The book was also the first in the series to make the New York Times Bestseller List. This novel was adapted into Season 1, Episodes 5&6 of Three Pines TV series.
5	The Brutal Telling	Minotaur Books	2009	978-1410423047
The Brutal Telling takes place in Three Pines with a body being discovered on the floor of the local bistro. No one in the town claims to know the victim who was bludgeoned to death. Gamache discovers the victim lived deep in the woods and suspects one of the locals as the suspect. The book was the winner of the 2009 Agatha Award and the 2010 Anthony Award, as well as reaching the New York Times Best-Seller List.
6	Bury Your Dead	Minotaur Books	2010	978-1585366040
Gamache is in Quebec City to enjoy the winter carnival. He is on leave after being involved in a shootout with a terrorist gang. While there, the body of an amateur archaeologist found at the Morrin Center draws Gamache into investigating his death. He also revisits the murder he solved in The Brutal Telling, the previous novel in the series. The book won the 2010 Agatha Award, the 2011 Anthony Award, the 2011 Macavity Award, the 2011 Arthur Ellis Award, and the 2011 Nero Award. It was also a bestseller on the New York Times, London Times, and USA Today lists to name a few.
7	A Trick of the Light	Minotaur Books	2011	978-1410441072
Gamache finds himself investigating the murder of Lillian Dyson, an artist who is found dead. Her childhood friend Clara Morrow is the main suspect, an artist herself who spent most of her life in the shadows of her husband. The book was nominated for a Macavity Award, Anthony Award, and the Agatha Award. It also reached #4 on the New York Times Bestseller List.
8	The Beautiful Mystery	Minotaur Books	2012	978-0312655464
The Beautiful Mystery has Gamache investigating the death of a monk. The monk is a member of the Gilbertine Order which was believed to be an extinct order. Gamache and his partner must travel by airplane and boat into the remote forests of northern Quebec to investigate the mystery. The book won the 2013 Macavity Award for Best Mystery and the 2013 Anthony Award. The book also reached #2 on the New York Times Bestseller List.
9	How the Light Gets In	Minotaur Books	2013	978-0312655471
Gamache comes to Three Pines looking for a safe haven. He is isolated by his corrupt supervisor and winds up luring two of his friends to Three Pines after their safety becomes an issue in an undercover operation. The book was nominated for an Edgar Award and an Agatha Award, as well as debuting at #1 on the New York Times Best-Seller List.
10	The Long Way Home	Minotaur Books	2014	978-1250022066
Gamache has retired from the force amid corruption within the department. He is summoned by Clara Morrow, one of the main characters in the book A Trick of the Light, whose husband has gone missing. The investigation takes him to the Gaspe Peninsula. The book reached #1 on the New York Times Bestseller List.
11	The Nature of the Beast	Minotaur Books	2015	978-1250022080
Gamache has retired and settled to live in Three Pines. He is drawn out of retirement by the death of Laurent Lepage, a nine-year-old boy known best in the town for crying wolf. His most recent claim was finding a gun with a winged monster on it in the woods. Gamache is allowed to work on the case, even though he is no longer officially a detective. It also reached #3 on the New York Times Bestseller List.
12	A Great Reckoning	Minotaur Books	2016	978-1250022134
13	Glass Houses	Minotaur Books	2017	978-1250066190
14	Kingdom of the Blind	Minotaur Books	2018	978-1250308122
15	A Better Man	Minotaur Books	2019	978-1250066213
Armand Gamache returns to the Sûreté after being demoted. Agent Lysette Cloutier's goddaughter Vivienne Godin is missing. They learn that Three Pines nearby Sûreté agent Bob Cameron had threatened Vivienne's abusive husband, Carl Tracey a week earlier. They have a confrontational and aggressive interview with Carl Tracey and find little when they search his house. A later search found that Tracey had recently cleaned up the house and burned all of Vivienne's belongings. The Bella Bella River is rising threatening to flood in Three Pines and beyond. Vivienne's duffel bag is found during flood-related digging. Her car is found near a bridge and they find her body down stream. An autopsy finds that she was twenty weeks pregnant. Beauvoir and Gamache begin building a case against Tracey, whom they believe is guilty. Pauline Vachon, Tracey's mistress, eventually confesses to helping plan Vivienne's murder. Sûreté agent Cameron admits to having an affair with Vivienne. Homer Godin, who had abused his daughter Vivienne starting when she was a child, and agent Lysette Cloutier both confessed to killing Vivienne. Jean-Guy recommends Isabelle Lacoste as Armand's second in command. The Beauvoir family, Annie is pregnant, go to Paris. It is revealed that Superintendent Toussaint leaked the real video of Gamache in the factory.
16	All the Devils Are Here	Minotaur Books	2020	978-1250145239
17	The Madness of Crowds	Minotaur Books	2021	978-1250145260
18	A World of Curiosities	Minotaur Books	2022	1250145295
19	The Grey Wolf	Minotaur Books	2024	9781250328137
20	The Black Wolf	St. Martin's Publishing Group	2025	9781250328175
21	Miss Wolcott's Ghost	Minotaur Books	2026	9781250412607

== Awards and recognition ==
In addition to numerous books making it to the New York Times Bestseller List, Penny has won multiple awards for the book series. She has won the Anthony and the Agatha Awards five times each and the Canadian Arthur Ellis Award twice. She was also a finalist for the Edgar Award for How The Light Gets In. The books have also earned her numerous Macavity Awards, and been nominated for numerous others.

== Adaptations ==
Still Life was adapted as a film for CBC Television in 2013, with Gamache being played by British actor Nathaniel Parker.

Alfred Molina plays Gamache in the Amazon Prime series Three Pines, which began filming in September 2021 and aired in December 2022.
