= A Fatal Grace =

Canadian mystery novel

- Cover art for A Fatal Grace.
- Author: Louise Penny
- Illustrator: Rob Wood
- Language: English
- Series: Chief Inspector Armand Gamache
- Genre: Mystery, crime novel
- Published: 2007 (St. Martin's Press)
- Pages: 320 (first edition, hardcover)
- ISBN: 978-0-312-35256-1
- Preceded by: Still Life
- Followed by: The Cruelest Month

A Fatal Grace, by Louise Penny, published in Canada as Dead Cold, is the second novel in the Three Pines Mysteries series, which feature Chief Inspector Armand Gamache, published in 2007.

In December 2022, the novel was adapted to streaming television at Amazon Prime Video as "White Out", the two-part series premiere of Three Pines, starring Alfred Molina, written by Emilia di Girolamo and directed by Sam Donovan.

== Plot summary ==
Inspector Gamache investigates after CC de Poitiers, a sadistic socialite, is fatally electrocuted at a Christmas curling competition in the small Québécois town of Three Pines. CC, who had a "spiritual guidance" business based on eliminating emotion, was hated by seemingly everyone, including her husband, lover, and daughter. The crime links to a vagrant's recent murder as well as to the pasts of several other villagers.

== Awards and recognition ==
A Fatal Grace was the recipient of the Agatha Award for best mystery novel of 2007.

== Adaptation ==
In December 2022, the novel was adapted as the two-part episode "White Out", serving as the series premiere of the mystery television series Three Pines, starring Alfred Molina as Chief Inspector Armand Gamache, written by Emilia di Girolamo, directed by Sam Donovan, and released to Amazon Prime Video.

== See also ==
- Curling
- Battle of the Somme
- 'Lucky Man' song by Emerson
- Abou Ben Adhem (poem)
- Père Noël
- "A Satirical Elegy on the Death of a Late Famous General" by Jonathan Swift (1722):
- The third Day comes a frost, a killing frost.. (Wolsey's Farewe)
- Psalm 46
- Greyfriars Bobby

Awards
Preceded by The Virgin of Small Plains, Nancy Pickard	Agatha Award for Best Novel; 2007	Succeeded by The Cruelest Month, Louise Penny
