= State of Terror =

2021 novel by Hillary Clinton and Louise Penny

- Author: Hillary Rodham Clinton; Louise Penny
- Language: English
- Publisher: Simon & Schuster, St. Martin's Press
- Publication date: October 12, 2021
- Publication place: United States
- Pages: 320
- ISBN: 9781982173678

State of Terror is a political-mystery novel written by former United States Secretary of State Hillary Rodham Clinton and Canadian mystery novelist Louise Penny. A spin-off of Penny's Inspector Gamache series, the titular character appearing in a minor role, the book was released October 12, 2021, jointly published by Simon & Schuster and St. Martin's Press.

== Background and release ==
The book project was announced on February 23, 2021, with the two authors' usual publishers distributing the work on October 21, 2021. The book debuted at number 1 on the October 31 New York Times bestseller lists for combined print and e-book fiction as well as hardcover fiction. It also appeared on Publishers Weekly's October 25 bestseller lists for Top 100 Overall and Hardcover Frontlist Fiction.
