= Jason Starr =

American novelist

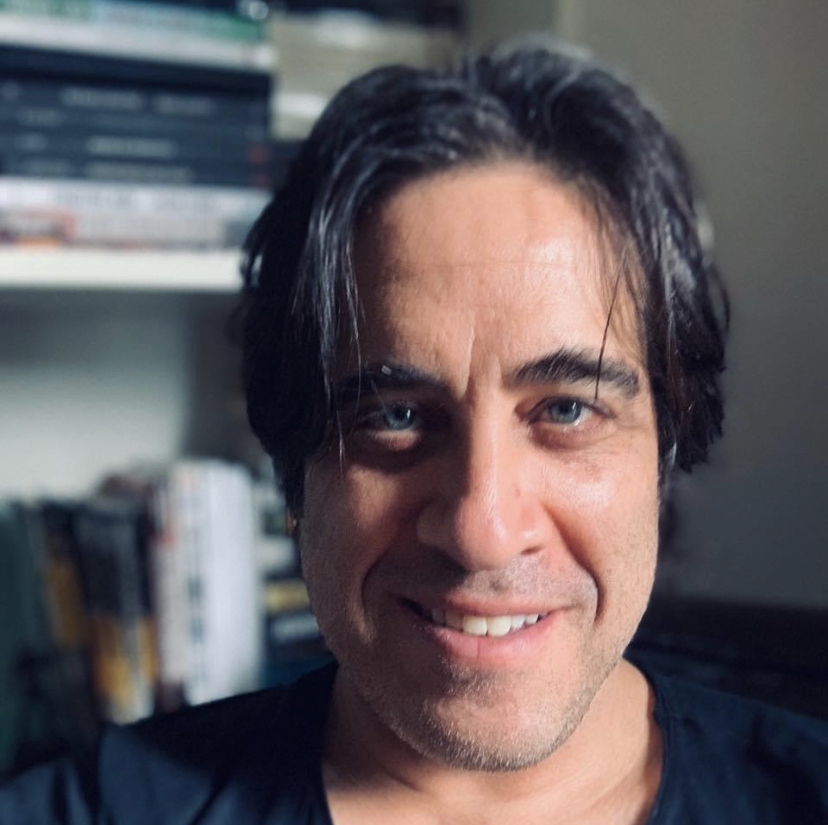
- Starr in 2020
- Born: November 22, 1966 (age 59); Brooklyn, New York
- Occupations: Novelist; screenwriter; comics writer
- Writing career
- Genres: Crime, Thriller, Satire
- Literary movement: Modern crime, Noir
- Website: jasonstarr.com

Jason Starr (born November 22, 1966) is an American author, comic book writer, and screenwriter from New York City. Starr has written numerous crime fiction novels and thrillers.

Starr's Tough Luck, a novel published in 2003, was a Barry Award Winner for Best Paperback Original and was a nominee at the 2004 Anthony Awards for Best Paperback Original. Twisted City won the award for Best Paperback Original at the 2005 Anthony Awards. Furthermore, in 2011, The Chill won the first ever Anthony Award for Best Graphic Novel.

Starr is part of a literary circle that includes Ken Bruen, Daniel Woodrell, Wallace Stroby, Alan Glynn, Ed Brubaker, Lee Child, Bret Easton Ellis, Megan Abbott, Brian Azzarello, and Alison Gaylin.

== Biography ==
Jason Starr was born and raised in Brooklyn, New York. Growing up, he enjoyed sports such as baseball, tennis, and horse racing, but didn't have much interest in literature. He attended Midwood High School in Brooklyn. He began writing plays and fiction in college at Binghamton University. Starr is known for his satirical urban crime novels, set mainly in the New York City area. When asked why (until The Pack) he wrote standalone novels and didn't rely on a series character he said, "New York City is my series character."

In the 1990s, Starr had several plays performed at Off-Off Broadway theater companies in New York. In 1997, Starr's first crime novel, Cold Caller, was published by No Exit Press in the U.K. In 1998, upon its American publication by W.W. Norton, Cold Caller was selected as a Publishers Weekly First Fiction pick and was hailed by Kirkus Reviews as "just the thing for fans who miss the acid noir that Jim Thompson dispensed in The Grifters." The French edition of Cold Caller was selected as the official gift of the prestigious 813 book group. In the critical work Twentieth Century Crime Fiction, (Oxford University Press, 2005), author Lee Horsley selected Cold Caller as one of the basic texts for discussion.

Starr's second novel, Nothing Personal, about a compulsive gambler who hatches a sick kidnapping plot to pay off debts, was hailed as the best novel of the year by Bookends. Starr's third novel, Fake I.D., concerns a bouncer's desperate attempts to join a horse-owning syndicate. His fourth novel, Hard Feelings, about a computer networking salesman, trying to do deal with a horror from his past, was a "Penzler Pick" and the first ever original novel published by the prestigious American publisher, Vintage Crime/Black Lizard.

Tough Luck, Starr's fifth novel, about a young guy in Brooklyn who gets in deep with a mob figure, was an Anthony Award finalist and won the Barry Award for best paperback. Starr's sixth novel, Twisted City, about the devastating consequences a financial journalist faces when he attempts to recover a stolen wallet, was a Barry Award finalist and an Anthony Award winner. In 2006, Starr's novel Lights Out, a tale of jealousy and murder set in Brooklyn, was first published by St. Martin's Press in the U.S. and Orion in the U.K. It was hailed as one of the best crime novels of the year by Barnes and Noble.com and Bookreporter.com. That same year, Vintage Books published a collection of stories and essays on horse racing called Bloodlines: A Horse Racing Anthology, which Starr co-edited with Maggie Estep.

In 2007, Starr's thriller The Follower, called "this generation's Looking for Mr. Goodbar" by the New York Post, was first published by St. Martin's Press and Orion Books. TV/Film rights for The Follower were purchased by Lionsgate with Bret Easton Ells attached as writer. Also in 2007, Hard Case Crime published Slide, a second novel co-authored by Starr and Ken Bruen. In 2008, Hard Case published Starr and Bruen's third novel in the series, The Max. The fourth novel in the series, PIMP, was published in 2016.

Panic Attack, Starr's thriller about the aftermath of a shooting in suburban New York City, was published in 2009 by St. Martin's Press. The German/ Diogenes Verlag edition (Panik) was a major #3 bestseller in Austria. It was optioned by David Fincher's production company Panic Pictures with Ocean's Eleven scribe Ted Griffin adapting.

In 2010, Starr's first graphic novel, The Chill, was published by Vertigo Crime, with art by Mick Bertilorenzi. Starr also wrote many comics for DC Comics (Justice, Inc.). In 2011, The Chill won the Anthony Award for Best Graphic Novel, making Starr one of only nine writers who have won multiple Anthony Awards.

In 2011, Penguin/Ace published Starr's The Pack, the first book in a new modern day werewolf series set mainly in the New York City area. The second book in the series, The Craving, was published by Penguin in June 2012.

In 2016, Starr's psychological thriller, Savage Lane was published by Polis Books. Savage Lane was also published in foreign editions, including the U.K. edition by No Exit Press and the German edition, Phantasien, by Diogenes Verlag.

In 2018, Oceanview Publishing published Starr's thriller, Fugitive Red.

In 2022, Hard Case Crime published Starr's mind-bending crime thriller, The Next Time I Die, which received praise from Ian Rankin and Joe Hill.

Starr has collaborated several times with Irish crime writer, Ken Bruen. In 2006, the heralded American pulp publisher Hard Case Crime, published Bust. (Bust was an IMBA bestseller). In 2007, Hard Case Crime published Slide, a second novel co-authored by Starr and Bruen. In 2008, Hard Case published Starr and Bruen's third novel in the series, The Max. The fourth novel in the series, PIMP, was published in 2016. The series became known as "The Bust Quartet."

Starr has also become a prolific writer of comics and graphic novels, writing original works such as The Chill, as well as working on iconic characters such as Batman, Doc Savage, The Avenger, The Sandman for DC Comics and The Punisher and Wolverine Marvel Comics. The Chill won the 2011 Anthony Award for Best Graphic Novel. In October, 2012 Marvel launched its new ongoing series Wolverine Max, written by Starr with art by Roland Boschi. Starr's original comic The Returning launched from Boom Comics in March 2014, with art by Andrea Mutti (The Executor, Star Wars, Noir). Starr's original horror-thriller series Red Border (art by Will Conrad) was published by AWA in 2020, followed up in 2021 by the erotic thriller, Casual Fling (art by Dalibor Talajic) in 2022. Casual Fling went on to become a digital top 20 bestseller on GlobalComix. In 2024, Magma Comix published Starr's sci-fi crime thriller Silicon Bandits (art by Dalibor Talajic).

For Marvel and DC related properties, Starr has written bestselling tie-in novels. Starr's Ant-Man: Natural Enemy was published in 2015 in conjunction with the hit movie: Ant-Man. Starr's novel Gotham: Dawn of Darkness, a prequel to the hit FOX TV show Gotham was published in January, 2017.

Starr later wrote another tie-in novel for Gotham entitled City of Monsters serving to bridge a gap between season 2 and 3 of the show.

Starr's work has been published in nine languages, including in Germany by Diogenes Verlag. Top Job (the German edition of Cold Caller) was adapted as an hour-long radio drama by Deutschland Radio. In 2006 a hardcover edition of Top Job was published as part of a popular series of crime novels (SZ Krimibibliothek) by Süddeutsche Zeitung.

== Bibliography ==
=== Novels ===
- 1998 – Cold Caller – ISBN 0393317676
- 2000 – Nothing Personal – ISBN 1568581610
- 2000 – Fake I.D. – ISBN 1901982831
- 2002 – Hard Feelings – ISBN 0375727094
- 2003 – Tough Luck – ISBN 0375727116
  (finalist 2004 Anthony Award for Best Paperback Original)
- 2004 – Twisted City – ISBN 1400075068
  (winner 2005 Anthony Award for Best Paperback Original)
- 2006 – Lights Out – ISBN 978-0312359720
- 2007 – The Follower – ISBN 978-0312359744
- 2009 – Panic Attack – ISBN 978-0312387068
- 2011 – The Pack – ISBN 978-0441020089
- 2012 – The Craving – ISBN 978-1937007553
- 2015 – Savage Lane - ISBN 978-1075841996
- 2018 – Fugitive Red (UK title Too Far) - ISBN 978-1608093144
- 2022 – The Next Time I Die - ISBN 978-1789099515

=== Film and TV Tie-In Novels ===
- 2015 – Ant-Man: Natural Enemy – ISBN 978-0785193234
- 2017 – Gotham: Dawn of Darkness
- 2018 - Gotham: City of Monsters

=== Novels (co-written with Ken Bruen) ===
- 2006 – Bust – ISBN 978-0843955910
- 2007 – Slide – ISBN 978-0843957761
  (finalist 2008 Anthony Award for Best Paperback Original)
- 2008 – The Max – ISBN 978-0843959666
- 2016 – Pimp – ISBN 978-1783295692

=== Graphic novels ===
- 2010 – The Chill – ISBN 978-1401212865
  (winner 2011 Anthony Award for Best Graphic Novel)
- 2015 – The Returning – ISBN 978-1-60886-493-5
- 2020 – Red Border – ISBN 1733499369
- 2021 – Casual Fling – ISBN 1953165206, 978-1953165206
- 2024 - Silicon Bandits – ISBN 1963547012, 978-1963547016

=== Comic books ===
- 2009–2010 – Justice, Inc.. (in Doc Savage issues 1–9, DC Comics)
- 2010 – Sand (in JSA 80 Page Giant issue, DC Comics)
- 2011 – First Wave Special #1 (featuring The Avenger, Doc Savage, Batman; DC Comics)
- 2012 – Punisher Max (Special, Marvel Comics)
- 2012–2014 – Wolverine Max (issues 1–15; Marvel Comics)
- 2014 – The Returning (Boom Comics)
- 2018 - The Range in Where We Live (Image Comics)
- 2020 - Red Border (AWA)
- 2021 - Casual Fling (AWA)
- 2024 - Silicon Bandits (Magma Comix)

=== Short-story collections ===
- 2006 – Bloodlines: An Anthology of Horse Racing (co-edited with Maggie Estep) – ISBN 1400096952
- 2020 – Outlawed Ink

=== Film / TV ===
- 2010 – The Bully (short film) based on the short story by Jason Starr
- 2024 - Twisted City, to be directed by John David Coles, Talking Wall Pictures
- 2024 - The Follower (TBA), TV
- 2024 - Casual Fling (TBA, TV
