= Louise Penny =

Canadian author (born 1958)

Louise Penny CM OQ
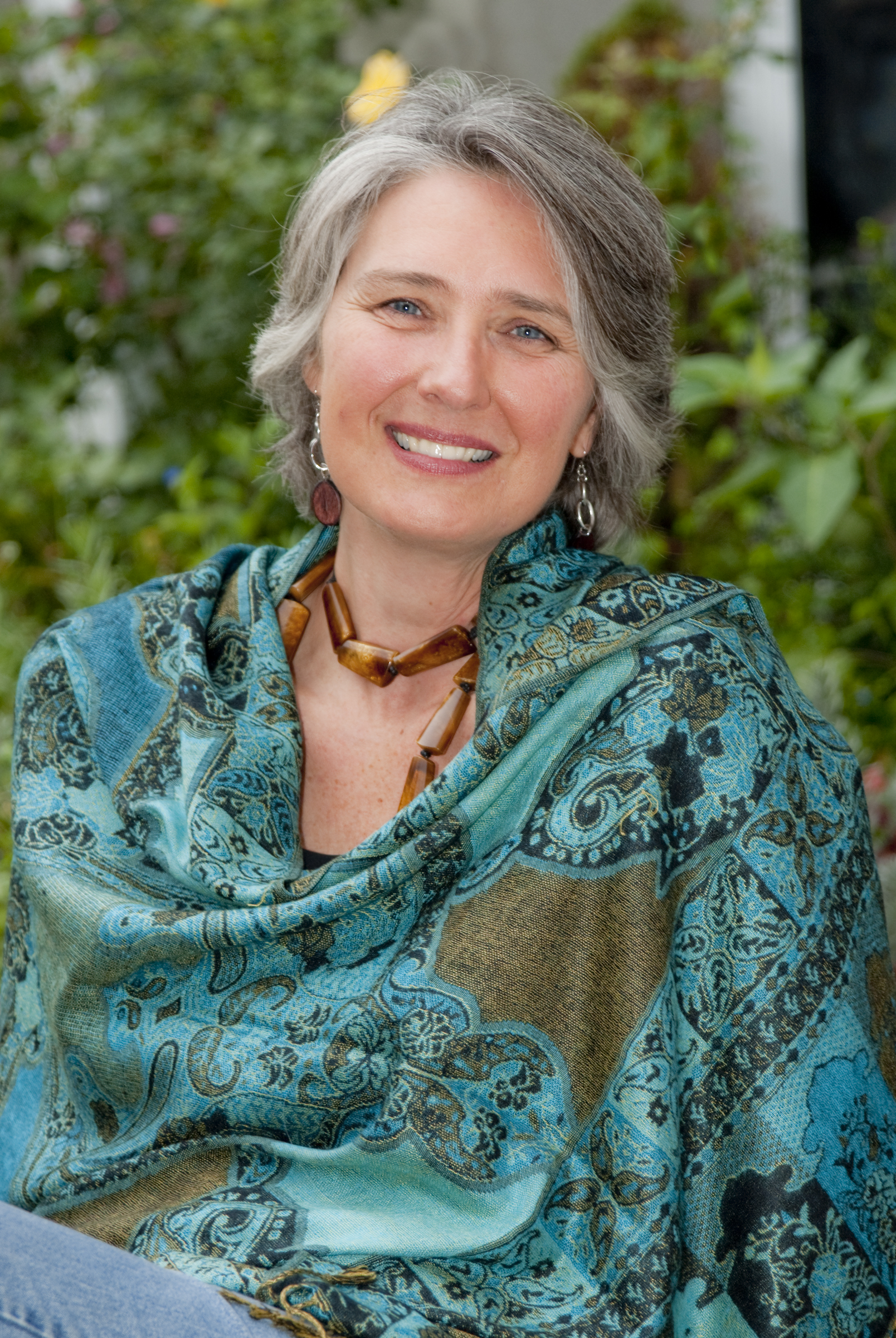
- Penny in 2009
- Born: July 1, 1958 (age 68); Toronto, Ontario, Canada
- Education: Bachelor of Applied Arts
- Alma mater: Ryerson Polytechnical Institute
- Occupation: Novelist
- Writing career
- Language: English
- Period: 2005–present
- Genre: Mystery fiction
- Notable work: Chief Inspector Armand Gamache (Three Pines Mysteries) series
- Website: www.louisepenny.com

Louise Penny CM OQ (1 July 1958), is a Canadian crime-fiction author, best known for her Chief Inspector Armand Gamache series set in Quebec. Her novels have been translated into over 23 languages, sold millions of copies worldwide, and repeatedly reached number 1 on the New York Times Best Seller list. She has also earned prestigious awards including multiple Agatha and Anthony Awards, and was appointed a Member of the Order of Canada and an Officer of the National Order of Quebec in 2017.

== Early life and career with the CBC ==
Penny was born in Toronto, Canada, on July 1, 1958. Her mother was an avid reader of both fiction and non-fiction, with a particular liking for crime fiction, and Louise grew up reading mystery writers such as Agatha Christie, Georges Simenon, Dorothy L. Sayers, and Michael Innes.

Penny earned a Bachelor of Applied Arts (Radio and Television) from Ryerson Polytechnical Institute (now Toronto Metropolitan University) in 1979. After graduation, aged 21, she embarked on an 18-year career as a radio host and journalist with the Canadian Broadcasting Corporation (CBC).

== Literary career ==
Penny left the CBC in 1996 to take up writing. She started a historical novel but had difficulty finishing it and eventually switched to mystery writing. She entered her first novel, Still Life, in the "Debut Dagger" competition in the United Kingdom, placing second out of 800 entries. The novel won other awards, including the "New Blood" Dagger award in the United Kingdom, the Arthur Ellis Award in Canada for best first crime novel, the Dilys Award, the Anthony Award and the Barry Award for Best First Novel in the United States.

Penny continues to write, garnering major crime novel award nominations for almost every one of her novels and subsequently winning several of those awards.

Her work features Chief Inspector Armand Gamache, head of the homicide department of the Sûreté du Québec. The novels are set in the province of Quebec but feature many hallmarks of the British whodunit genre, including murders by unconventional means, bucolic villages, large casts of suspects, red herrings, and a dramatic disclosure of the murderer in the last few pages of the book.

In 2009, Penny helped to launch a new award for aspiring Canadian mystery writers, the Unhanged Arthur for Best Unpublished First Novel.

In 2025, Penny publicly supported the Haskell Free Library and Opera House, which straddles the Canada–United States border, after new American restrictions threatened Canadian access to the building. A frequent visitor and the library’s most-borrowed author, she criticized the measures as an attack on cultural institutions and donated CA$50,000 to help fund a new Canadian entrance. Penny also announced that she would not tour the United States to promote The Black Wolf, the 20th novel in her Chief Inspector Gamache series, citing opposition to Donald Trump’s tariff threats against Canada and his appointment as chair of the Kennedy Center board. Originally scheduled to launch at the Kennedy Center in Washington, D.C., the book’s release was instead moved to the National Arts Centre in Ottawa, where tickets sold out within hours. It marked the first time in two decades that one of her publicity tours did not include stops in the United States.

For a May 2026 book release, Penny collaborated with international field journalist Mellissa Fung on The Last Mandarin, a thriller about a world-prominent first generation Chinese-American human rights activist and the daughter in her shadow, propelled "from the Oval Office to Ohio and then ... Hong Kong, [unlocking] old legends and languages long ago invented by women," to confront an explosive conspiracy of international scope.

== Personal life ==
At the start of her broadcasting career, Penny took postings at locations far from friends and family, and to help deal with feelings of loneliness and isolation, she increasingly turned to alcohol. At the age of 35, she admitted to an alcohol problem and has been sober since. Shortly afterwards, she met her future husband, Michael Whitehead, head of hematology at Montreal Children's Hospital, on a blind date. Whitehead was diagnosed with dementia in 2013 and Penny took on the role as his primary caregiver. He died on September 18, 2016.

== Honours ==
In 2013, she was made a Member of the Order of Canada "for her contributions to Canadian culture as an author shining a spotlight on the Eastern Townships of Quebec". In 2017 she was made a Member of the Order of Quebec. In 2017, she was awarded an honorary Doctor of Literature from Carleton University.

== Adaptations ==
For several years, Penny resisted selling the TV or movie rights to her books, afraid of losing creative control of her characters. However, when approached by PDM Entertainment and Attraction Images and offered a position as executive producer during film production, she changed her mind and agreed to sell them the rights to her first two novels. Still Life went into production in the fall of 2012, with British actor Nathaniel Parker cast as Chief Inspector Gamache. The movie aired on CBC TV in 2013.

In September 2021, production of Three Pines began in Montreal and rural Quebec, starring Alfred Molina. The series was distributed by Prime Video and generally received positive praise from audiences and critics. Despite this, the series was cancelled after the first season due to Left Bank Pictures and Prime Video being unable to reach an agreement on how to move forward for a second season.

== Awards ==
Year	Work	Award	Category	Result	Ref
2005	Still Life	Arthur Ellis Award	First Novel	Won	
2005	Still Life	Dilys Award	—	Won	
2006	Still Life	CWA New Blood Dagger	—	Won	
2007	Still Life	Anthony Award	Novel	Won	
2007	Still Life	Barry Award	—	Won	
2007	A Fatal Grace	Agatha Award	—	Won	
2008	The Cruelest Month	Agatha Award	—	Won	
2008	The Cruelest Month	Arthur Ellis Award	—	Nominated	
2008	The Cruelest Month	Barry Award	—	Nominated	
2009	The Cruelest Month	Anthony Award		Nominated	
2009	The Cruelest Month	Macavity Award	—	Nominated	
2009	The Murder Stone	Arthur Ellis Award	—	Nominated	
2009	The Brutal Telling	Agatha Award	—	Won	
2010	The Brutal Telling	Anthony Award	—	Won	
2010	Bury Your Dead	Agatha Award	—	Won	
2011	Bury Your Dead	Anthony Award	—	Won	
2011	Bury Your Dead	Macavity Award	—	Won	
2011	Bury Your Dead	Arthur Ellis Award	—	Won	
2011	Bury Your Dead	Nero Award	—	Won	
2011	A Trick of the Light	Agatha Award	—	Nominated	
2011	A Trick of the Light	Macavity Award	—	Nominated	
2012	A Trick of the Light	Anthony Award	—	Nominated	
2013	The Beautiful Mystery	Macavity Award	Best Mystery	Won	
2013	How the Light Gets In	Edgar Award	—	Nominated	
2013	How the Light Gets In	Agatha Award	—	Nominated	
2015	The Nature of the Beast	Anthony Award	—	Nominated	
2015	The Nature of the Beast	Agatha Award	—	Nominated	
2015	The Nature of the Beast	Lefty Award	Best World Mystery	Won	
2020	All the Devils Are Here	Agatha Award	Best Contemporary Novel	Won	

== Published works ==
=== Fiction ===
Inspector Gamache series

- Still Life (2005) – Winner of the New Blood Dagger award, the Arthur Ellis Award, the Dilys Award, the 2007 Anthony Award, and the Barry Award
- A Fatal Grace (Alternate title: Dead Cold and White Out as the television episode) (2007) – Winner of the 2007 Agatha Award
- The Cruelest Month (2008) – Winner of the 2008 Agatha Award; nominated for the 2009 Anthony, the 2008 Macavity Award, and the 2008 Barry Award
- The Murder Stone (A Rule Against Murder in U.S.) (2009) – Nominated for an Arthur Ellis Award
- The Brutal Telling (2009) – Winner of the 2009 Agatha Award, and the 2010 Anthony Award
- Bury Your Dead (2010) – Winner of the 2010 Agatha Award, the 2011 Anthony Award, the 2011 Macavity Award, the 2011 Arthur Ellis Award, and the 2011 Nero Award
- A Trick of the Light (2011) – Nominated for a Macavity, an Anthony Award, and an Agatha Award
- The Hangman (2011) – A novella in the Inspector Gamache series, written at a third grade level for emerging adult readers.
- The Beautiful Mystery (2012) – Winner of the 2013 Macavity Award for Best Mystery
- How the Light Gets In (2013) – Nominated for an Edgar Award and an Agatha Award
- The Long Way Home (2014) – Inspector Gamache's friend Clara enlists him to find her missing husband, Peter.
- The Nature of the Beast (2015) – Quebec ballistics scientist and international artillery expert Gerald Bull's assassination and his supergun are central plot elements – Nominated for an Anthony Award, an Agatha Award, and winner of Left Coast Crime's Best World Mystery
- A Great Reckoning (2016) – A map found in the walls of the local Three Pines bistro leads Gamache to shattering secrets on his new job as the superintendent of the Sûreté Academy.
- Glass Houses (2017) – A dark figure appears in Three Pines and leads Gamache, head of the Sûreté, to an old wives' tale and murder.
- Kingdom of the Blind (2018) – Gamache, Myrna and a young builder are named executors of a will for a woman none of them has ever met.
- A Better Man (2019) - The murder of a young woman the same age as Gamache's daughter is the first big case for Gamache after his demotion. At the same time, the entire region faces the danger of much larger-than-usual spring flooding.
- All the Devils Are Here (2020) – International business intrigue within the context of intense family dynamics. Set in Paris – Winner of the 2020 Agatha Award for Best Contemporary Novel
- The Madness of Crowds (2021) - Navigating hot-button political polarization within the familiar backdrop of Three Pines, Gamache and Beauvoir face personal complications in this mystery.
- A World of Curiosities (2022) - Incorporating codes and embedded messages in art, this novel explores the impact of the past on the present with layers of meaning and the power of forgiveness.
- The Grey Wolf (2024) - Mystery and intrigue on a global level, as compassion struggles against rage. Long-standing tensions between Gamache and his son Daniel come to the fore in this intense battle against a terrorism plot.
- The Black Wolf (2025)
- Miss Wolcott's Ghost (2026)

Other works

- State of Terror (2021), co-written with Hillary Clinton
- The Last Mandarin (2026), co-written with Mellissa Fung

== See also ==
- Canadian literature
- Eastern Townships
- List of Quebec writers
- Tariffs in the second Trump administration
