= Jim Huang =

American author and editor of crime fiction

Jim Huang is an American author and editor of crime fiction, as well as the owner and operator of Crum Creek Press and The Mystery Company imprint.

== Personal life ==
Huang has a wife named Jennie. Together, they have lived in Boston, Massachusetts; Kalamazoo, Michigan; Carmel, Indiana; Gambier, Ohio; and Bryn Mawr, Pennsylvania.

== Education ==
Huang received an undergraduate degree in political science from Swarthmore College in 1982. While there, he edited the student newspaper and helped found Swarthmore Warders of Imaginative Literature, a science-fiction/fantasy club.

== Career ==
Huang began editing and publishing The Drood Review of Mystery in 1982, a job he held until 2005. His work with Drood ultimately led to the creation of The Crum Creek Press, a small book-publishing company Huang established in 1989.

He began his bookselling career in 1987 at Spenser's Mystery Bookshop in Boston, where he worked for four years before moving to Kalamazoo, Michigan in 1992. There, he opened the Deadly Passions Bookshop, which specialized in mystery, romance, and science-fiction/fantasy books. The store closed in 2000. Three years later, Huang opened The Mystery Company in Carmel, Indiana. The store closed in 2010. Following this closure, Huang began managing the Kenyon College bookstore in Gambier, Ohio. Five years later, he moved to Bryn Mawr, Pennsylvania, where he now serves as the director of the Bryn Mawr College Bookshop.

During his time working at bookshops, Huang decided an imprint, which he named after his store in Carmel, Indiana: The Mystery Company. The first title was sold in 2003, and the first original text, In a Teapot by Terence Faherty, was sold in 2005.

Huang co-founded the Independent Mystery Booksellers Association. He also served as a board member and president for the Carmel Clay Public Library's Friends, a board member for Sisters in Crime (2006-2011), and program director of Magna Cum Murder (2000-2008). In addition to these service roles, he was a subject matter expert on mystery for Cengage Gale's "What Do I Read Next?" (2007-2009).

== Awards ==
Year	Title	Award	Result
2000	100 Favorite Mysteries of the Century	Agatha Award for Best Nonfiction	Winner
2001	100 Favorite Mysteries of the Century	Macavity Award for Best Nonfiction	Nominee
2001	100 Favorite Mysteries of the Century	Anthony Award for Best Critical Work	Winner
2002	The Died in Vain	Agatha Award for Best Nonfiction	Winner
2003	The Died in Vain	Anthony Award for Best Critical Work	Winner
2003	The Died in Vain	Macavity Award for Best Critical/Biographical Mystery Work	Winner
2006	Mystery Muses, with Austin Lugar	Agatha Award for Best Nonfiction	Shortlist
2007	Mystery Muses, with Austin Lugar	Macavity Award for Best Critical/Biographical Mystery Work	Winner
2007	Mystery Muses, with Austin Lugar	Anthony Award for Best Critical Work	Winner
2007		Anthony Award for Special Service	Winner

== Publications ==
- 100 Favorite Mysteries of the Century (2000)
- They Died in Vain: Overlooked, Underappreciated and Forgotten Mystery Novels (2002)
- Mystery Muses: 100 Classics That Inspire Today's Mystery Writers, with Austin Lugar (2006)
- Organizing Crime: The Mystery Company's Guide to Series, with Austin Lugar (2009)
- What Do I Read Next? Volume 2, with Natalie Danford, Dana Ferguson, Don D'Ammassa, and Marcia Ford (2009)
- Organizing Crime: The Mystery Company's Guide to Series (Second Ed.), with Austin Lugar and Nikki Phipps (2014)
