= Bouchercon XXXIX =

2008 mystery and detective fiction convention

- "Charmed to Death"
- Date: October 9, 2008
- Location: Baltimore, Maryland
- Country: USA
- Hosted by: Ruth Jordan, Judy Bobalik

Bouchercon is an annual convention of creators and devotees of mystery and detective fiction. It is named in honour of writer, reviewer, and editor Anthony Boucher; also the inspiration for the Anthony Awards, which have been issued at the convention since 1986. This page details Bouchercon XXXIX and the 23rd Anthony Awards ceremony.

== Bouchercon ==
The convention was held in Baltimore, Maryland on October 9, 2008; running until the 12th. The event was chaired by Ruth Jordan, publisher and editor of Crimespree magazine, and Judy Bobalik, editor of the Reflections in a Private Eye magazine.

=== Special Guests ===
- Lifetime Achievement awards — Robert Rosenwald & Barbara Peters
- Distinguished Contribution to the Genre award — Lawrence Block
- International Guest of Honor — John Harvey
- American Guest of Honor — Laura Lippman
- Toastmaster — Mark Billingham
- Fan Guest of Honor — Thalia Proctor

== Anthony Awards ==
The following list details the awards distributed at the twenty-third annual Anthony Awards ceremony.

=== Novel award ===
Winner:

- Laura Lippman, What the Dead Know

Shortlist:

- James Lee Burke, The Tin Roof Blowdown
- Lee Child, Bad Luck and Trouble
- Robert Crais, The Watchman
- William Kent Krueger, Thunder Bay

=== First novel award ===
Winner:

- Tana French, In the Woods

Shortlist:

- Sean Chercover, Big City, Bad Blood
- Lisa Lutz, The Spellman Files
- Craig McDonald, Head Games
- Marcus Sakey, The Blade Itself

=== Paperback original award ===
Winner:

- P. J. Parrish, A Thousand Bones

Shortlist:

- Megan Abbott, Queenpin
- Ken Bruen & Jason Starr, Slide
- David Corbett, Blood of Paradise
- Robert Fate, Baby Shark's Beaumont Blues

=== Short story award ===
Winner:

- Laura Lippman, "Hardly Knew Her", from Dead Man's Hand: Crime Fiction at the Poker Table

Shortlist:

- Rhys Bowen, "Please Watch Your Step", from The Strand Magazine February/May 2007
- Steve Hockensmith, "Dear Dr. Watson", from Ellery Queen's Mystery Magazine February 2007
- Toni Kelner, "How Stella Got Her Grave Back", from Many Bloody Returns: Tales of Birthdays with Bite
- Daniel Woodrell, "Uncle", from A Hell of a Woman: An Anthology of Female Noir

=== Critical / Non-fiction award ===
Winner:

- Jon Lellenberg, Daniel Stashower & Charles Foley, Arthur Conan Doyle: A Life in Letters

Shortlist:

- Roger Sobin, The Essential Mystery Lists
- Patrick Anderson, The Triumph of the Thriller: How Cops, Crooks and Cannibals Captured Popular Fiction
- Christiana Gregoriou, Deviance in Contemporary Crime Fiction

=== Website award ===
Winner:

- Stan Ulrich & Lucinda Surber, Stop, You're Killing Me!

Shortlist:

- Sarah Weinman, Confessions of an Idiosyncratic Mind
- J. Kingston Pierce, January Magazine (and The Rap Sheet)
- Tess Gerritsen & J. T. Ellison et al., Murderati
- David Montgomery, Crime Fiction Dossier

=== Special service award ===
Winner:

- Jon Jordan and Ruth Jordan, Crimespree Magazine

Shortlist:

- Ali Karim, Shots magazine
- Maddy Van Hertbruggen, 4 Mystery Addicts
- Sarah Weinman, Confessions of an Idiosyncratic Mind
- Judy Bobalik, for being one of the best friends and supporters of mystery writers
