= Wallace Stroby =

American novelist

Wallace Stroby (born 1960) is an American crime fiction author and journalist. He is the author of eight novels, four of which feature Crissa Stone, a female professional thief.

== Background ==
Stroby was born and raised in Monmouth County, New Jersey. He graduated from Rutgers University with a B.A. in Journalism and Mass Media, and while there wrote for both the Rutgers' Daily Targum and the Livingston (College) Medium. In 1985, while still a student at Rutgers, he was hired by The Asbury Park (N.J.) Press as the paper's overnight police reporter. He later became an editor on the paper's Sunday edition, to which he also contributed book reviews. The Society of Professional Journalists honored him with First Place awards for review writing in 1988, 1990, 1991 and 1992. In 1995 he was hired as a Features editor at the Newark (N.J.) Star-Ledger, the state's largest newspaper. There he won two more First Place SPJ Awards for review writing in 1995 and 1996, as well as three Society of Newspaper Design awards in 2001 and 2002 for editing special sections. He left the paper in 2008.

== Career ==
In the 1980s and 1990s, Stroby contributed to a number of magazines, including Esquire Japan, Reader's Digest, Writer's Digest, Filmfax, Fangoria and Outre. For the 1991 issue of Writer's Digest, he conducted an extensive interview with author Stephen King about his creative process, the first long-form interview King had done on the subject. The interview has been reprinted many times in at least three languages. King elaborated on many of the points he raised in the interview in his 2000 book ON WRITING: A MEMOIR OF THE CRAFT.

Stroby's first novel, THE BARBED-WIRE KISS, published in 2003 by St. Martin's Press, introduced his hero, an ex-N.J. state trooper named Harry Rane, who becomes entangled with a local mobster and his wife. In a starred review, Publishers Weekly termed the novel "a dazzling debut," and the Chicago Tribune called it "our annual dose of proof that fresh, new writers can revitalize the mystery genre." Writing in The New York Times, reviewer Marilyn Stasio said, "Stroby does wonders with his blue-collar characters," and The Washington Post called the book "a scorching first novel ... full of attention to character and memory and, even more, to the neighborhoods of New Jersey." The book was a finalist for the 2004 Barry Award for Best First Novel.

Rane returned in 2005 in Stroby's second novel, THE HEARTBREAK LOUNGE, which found his hero in a violent confrontation with Johnny Harrow, a murderous ex-con who'd returned to his coastal New Jersey home on a mission of vengeance. Kirkus Reviews called it "a brilliant follow-up to Stroby's impressive debut" and said, "Harry Rane walks these mean streets perfectly at home with the icons: Spade, Marlowe and Archer." Reviewing the book for The New York Times, Marilyn Stasio said Stroby writes "with such fierce originality that he rejuvenates genre conventions," and found Harrow "an electrifying character." The South Florida Sun-Sentinel termed the book "a tightly plotted fireball of suspense, " and veteran crime novelist James Crumley called it "the real stuff ... a great pleasure, a crime novel full of fully realized characters - good guys and bad."

In 2005, Stroby's Jersey Shore-set short story "Lovers in the Cold" was published in the anthology MEETING ACROSS THE RIVER: Stories Inspired by the Haunting Bruce Springsteen Song (Bloomsbury). The following year, his short story "Heart" appeared in the horse racing-themed anthology BLOODLINES (Vintage), edited by Jason Starr and Maggie Estep. That story marked the first appearance of Morgan, an aging enforcer for a brutal Newark. N.J. drug gang with his own code of honor.

In 2010, Morgan returned in Stroby's stand-alone novel, GONE 'TIL NOVEMBER, which found him traveling to the rural South to recover $350,000 in missing drug money. He ends up on a collision course with Sara Cross, a single mom and the only female sheriff's deputy in a small Florida town. The Huffington Post wrote that the novel "puts Stroby in the company of noir masters like Dashiell Hammett and Elmore Leonard." In a starred review, Publishers Weekly called it "a powerful thriller" that "explores moral choices that leave his devastatingly real characters torn between doing nothing and risking everything." Novelist and producer George Pelecanos wrote that "Stroby's mastery of character and dialogue is mated to a hellacious narrative engine. Sara Cross is a wonderful creation."

In 2017, Stroby's short story "Night Run," which originally appeared in the 2016 anthology THE HIGHWAY KIND: Tales of Fast Cars, Desperate Drivers, and Dark Roads (Mulholland Books/Little, Brown & Co.), was chosen for inclusion in BEST AMERICAN MYSTERY STORIES 2017, edited by Otto Penzler and guest editor John Sandford. Stroby's story was one of the final 20 picked from a field of more than 2,000 entries.

== Crissa Stone novels ==
In 2011, St. Martin's Press published Stroby's COLD SHOT TO THE HEART, the first in his series about a female professional thief named Crissa Stone. This debut novel found Stone on the run after the robbery of a high-stakes card game goes awry. In a starred review, Kirkus called it "Another fast, taut winner from Stroby ... Crissa Stone many be crime fiction's best bad girl ever." The reviewer for the Chicago Tribune wrote that the novel "moves at a breakneck speed ... Stroby's sturdy plot is augmented by his intriguing look at how money corrupts and how even a crook can have a moral compass. Fans of Elmore Leonard and George V. Higgins' 'THE FRIENDS OF EDDIE COYLE' will find much to like." The Milwaukee Journal-Sentinel wrote "With each novel, Stroby's demonstrating he's got the literary muscle to be shelved with the big guys – Elmore Leonard, Jim Thompson and Richard Stark."

Stroby's follow-up, 2012's KINGS OF MIDNIGHT, found Stone joining up with an ex-mobster to search for long-hidden millions from the real-life Lufthansa heist that took place at New York's Kennedy Airport in 1978. New York magazine called the novel "brilliant," and the Los Angeles Review of Books wrote that "Stroby has risen to the top of his field. Crissa Stone has become one of the most relatable and likable criminals in contemporary crime fiction... a modern-day hero for an America still recovering from the economic collapse." Kirkus Reviews chose it as one of the Best Books of 2012.

Stone made her third appearance in 2013's SHOOT THE WOMAN FIRST, on the run again, this time with a duffle bag of stolen cash earmarked for the family of a slain partner, with a brutal ex-cop in pursuit. Publishers Weekly and Kirkus both gave the novel Starred Reviews, and The Boston Globe praised its "lean, poetic prose," and said, "For fans of noir, this is among the best of the current breed." Partially set in Detroit, the novel was dedicated to veteran crime novelist Elmore Leonard, who died shortly before it was published.

The fourth Crissa Stone novel, THE DEVIL'S SHARE, was published by St. Martin's Press in July 2015. It dealt with the theft of ancient Iraqi artifacts, and a corrupt art dealer who hires Stone to hijack a truckload of artifacts before they're repatriated to their native land. Publishers Weekly called THE DEVIL'S SHARE "a razor-sharp cinematic thriller which wastes no words and packs a huge punch."

== Television and film ==
In 2013, the Showtime network optioned the Crissa Stone novels for development as an original series, with a pilot script by Ted Tally, the Oscar-winning screenwriter of THE SILENCE OF THE LAMBS. Though a final script was written, the project never went to pilot, and the rights eventually reverted to Stroby. The Crissa Stone character returned in the short story "Nightbound," included in the 2019 anthology AT HOME IN THE DARK, edited by veteran crime fiction writer Lawrence Block, and published by Subterranean Press.

Stroby has also written extensively about film noir and American crime films of the 1970s for various publications, and continues to host screenings and film festivals. In 2013, he emceed a "Bruce Noir" film festival at the ShowRoom Theater in Asbury Park, N.J., showcasing five film noirs that had influenced the music of Bruce Springsteen. He is also an occasional co-host at the Bryant Park Summer Film Festival in New York CIty.

== Novels ==
- The Barbed-Wire Kiss (2003) ISBN 0-312-99547-4
- The Heartbreak Lounge (2005) ISBN 0-312-93912-4
- Gone 'Til November (2010) ISBN 978-0-312-67319-2
- Cold Shot to the Heart (2011) ISBN 978-0-312-56025-6
- Kings of Midnight (2012) ISBN 978-1-250-00037-8
- Shoot the Woman First (2013) ISBN 978-1-250-000385
- The Devil's Share (2015) ISBN 978-1-250-065759
- Some Die Nameless (2018) ISBN 978-0316440202
- Heaven's a Lie (2021)
