= Bryan Gruley =

American writer (born 1957)

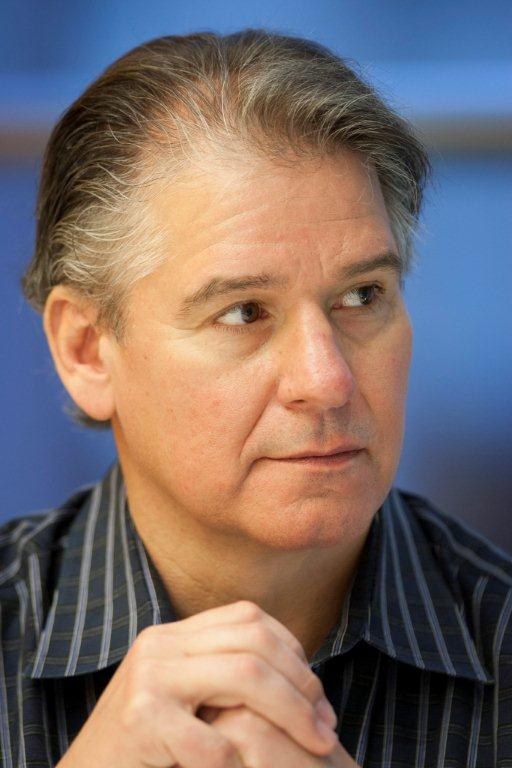
- Gruley in 2012
- Born: November 9, 1957 (age 68); Detroit, Michigan, U.S.
- Education: University of Notre Dame
- Occupations: Writer; reporter; editor
- Writing career
- Genres: Suspense, mystery
- Notable awards: Anthony Award
- Website: www.bryangruley.com

Bryan Gruley (born November 9, 1957) is an American writer. He has shared a Pulitzer Prize for journalism and been nominated for the "first novel" Edgar Award by the Mystery Writers of America.

== Career ==
Gruley studied at the University of Notre Dame where he majored in American Studies and graduated in 1979. Gruley is currently a reporter for Bloomberg News, writing long form features for Bloomberg Businessweek magazine. He worked more than 15 years for The Wall Street Journal including seven years as Chicago bureau chief.

With the Journal, he also helped cover breaking news including the September 11 World Trade Center attack, and shared in the staff's Pulitzer Prize for that work, which cited "its comprehensive and insightful coverage, executed under the most difficult circumstances, of the terrorist attack on New York City, which recounted the day's events and their implications for the future."

Gruley's first novel, Starvation Lake: a mystery, was published in 2009 as a trade paperback original by the Touchstone Books imprint of Simon & Schuster. It is set in the fictional town of Starvation Lake, based on Bellaire, the seat of Antrim County, Michigan. The real Starvation Lake is a lake in the next county, but the fictional town is on the lake, and the novel begins when the snowmobile of a long-missing youth hockey coach "washes up on the icy shores". Two sequels have followed in the so-called Starvation Lake series, The Hanging Tree (2010) and The Skeleton Box (2012). As of May 2013 Gruley is working on a new novel set in a different town with different characters.

Gruley played ice hockey as a boy and continues to play in his fifties, and to root for the Detroit Red Wings. He was schooled in Detroit, at Detroit Catholic Central, but the family vacationed up north and acquired a cottage in 1971 on Big Twin Lake near Bellaire, which the six siblings used until some time after their parents died. His first newspaper job was in the region as a 1978 summer intern at Antrim County News.

Gruley and his wife Pam currently live on the North Side of Chicago. They have three grown children.

== Books ==
- Paper Losses: a modern epic of greed and betrayal at America's two largest newspaper companies (New York: Grove Press, 1993) ISBN 0802114024
- Starvation Lake (Simon & Schuster, 2009). ISBN 978-1416563624
- The Hanging Tree (2010). ISBN 978-1416563648
- The Skeleton Box (2012). ISBN 978-1416563662
- Bleak Harbor: A Novel, Thomas & Mercer, 2018

== Awards ==
- 2002, shared by staff of the Wall Street Journal, Pulitzer Prize for Breaking News Reporting.

Starvation Lake (Touchstone/S&S, 2009)

- 2009 Milwaukee Journal Sentinel, Best Mystery Set Near a Lake
- 2009 The Strand Magazine Critics Award, Best First Novel
- 2010 Anthony Award (Boucheron world mystery convention), Best Paperback Original
- 2010 Anthony Award nomination, Best First Novel
- 2010 Barry Award (editors of Deadly Pleasures), Best Paperback Original
- 2010 Edgar Award (Mystery Writers of America), nomination, Best First Novel by an American author, Starvation Lake.

The Hanging Tree (Touchstone/S&S, 2010)

- 2011 Anthony Award nomination, Best Paperback Original
- 2011 Barry Award nomination, Best Paperback Original
- 2011 Michigan Notable Book Award
