= Starvation Lake (novel) =

2009 novel by Bryan Gruley

- Author: Bryan Gruley
- Genre: Mystery fiction, Crime, Thriller
- Published: 2009
- Publisher: Touchstone Books
- Pages: 370
- Awards: Anthony Award for Best Paperback Original and Nominee for Best First Novel (2010)
- ISBN: 978-1-416-56362-4
- Website: Starvation Lake

Starvation Lake is a mystery novel by American author Bryan Gruley, first published by Touchstone Books on March 3, 2009. It was Gruley's debut novel. It later went on to win the Anthony Award for Best Paperback Original and Nominee for Best First Novel in 2010.
