= The Brutal Telling =

Canadian mystery novel

- First edition.
- Author: Louise Penny
- Genre: Mystery fiction
- Published: 2009
- Publisher: Minotaur Books
- Pages: 372
- Awards: Anthony Award for Best Novel (2010)
- ISBN: 978-0-312-37703-8
- Preceded by: The Murder Stone
- Followed by: Bury Your Dead
- Website: The Brutal Telling

The Brutal Telling is a novel written by Louise Penny, the fifth novel in the Chief Inspector Armand Gamache series set in Quebec. It was published by Minotaur Books, an imprint of St. Martin's Press owned by Macmillan Publishers. The book was published on 22 September 2009. It won to the Anthony Award for Best Novel in 2010.

== Plot summary ==
The body of a man is found in the bistro in Three Pines. Investigations lead to a mysterious cottage in the nearby woods. Greed and revenge play a part. Chief Inspector Gamache Series has a detailed plot (with spoilers of course) at Series re-read. Literature references in this volume of the Gamache series include Charlotte's Web, the poetry of Ralph Hodgson, and works by Henry David Thoreau.

== See also ==
- Dissolution of Czechoslovakia
- Amber Room
- Carlo Bergonzi (luthier)
- Haidi Totem Poles
- Emily Carr
