= Hilary Davidson (writer) =

American novelist

- Education: University of Toronto
- Occupation: Writer
- Known for: Her first novel won an Anthony Award

Hilary Davidson is a Canadian and American novelist and journalist. Her novels include The Damage Done (2010), The Next One to Fall (2012), Evil in All Its Disguises (2013), Blood Always Tells (2014), One Small Sacrifice (2019), Don't Look Down (2020), and Her Last Breath (2021). She is also a prolific author of short stories, for which she has won multiple awards.

== Early life ==
Davidson graduated from the University of Toronto in 1994. After graduation she worked at Harper's Magazine in New York, Canadian Living magazine in Toronto, and went on to become a full-time freelance writer. Between 2000 and 2010, she authored or co-authored 17 books for Frommer's Travel Guides. In 2010 she published The Damage Done. It won the Anthony Award for best first novel of 2010. She has subsequently published several more novels.

Davidson was born in Toronto, Canada. She moved to New York City in October 2001. She is a dual citizen of Canada and the US.

== Novels ==
=== The Lily Moore Series ===
- The Damage Done (2010) ISBN 978-0765326973
- The Next One to Fall (2012) ISBN 978-0765326980
- Evil in All Its Disguises (2013) ISBN 978-0765333520

=== The Shadows of New York Series ===
- One Small Sacrifice (2019) ISBN 978-1542042116
- Don't Look Down (2020) ISBN 978-1542092036

=== Standalone ===
- Blood Always Tells (2014) ISBN 978-0765333544
- Her Last Breath (2021) ISBN 978-1542028691

== Awards ==
=== Awards Won ===
- 2018 Anthony Award for Best Short Story for "My Side of the Matter"
- 2015 Derringer Award for Best Long Story for "A Hopeless Case"
- 2011 Anthony Award for Best First Novel for The Damage Done
- 2010 Spinetingler Award for Best Short Story for "Insatiable"

=== Award Nominations ===
- 2020 Anthony Award for Best Short Story for "Unforgiven"
- 2018 Arthur Ellis Award for Best Short Story for "Jerusalem Syndrome"
- 2017 Derringer Award for Best Long Story for "Swan Song"
- 2016 Anthony Award for Best Short Story for "The Siege"
- 2016 Arthur Ellis Award for Best Short Story for "The Siege"
- 2013 Derringer Award for Best Short Story for "A Special Kind of Hell"
