= Still Life (Penny novel) =

2005 novel by Louise Penny

- First edition
- Author: Louise Penny
- Genre: Mystery fiction
- Published: 2005
- Publisher: St. Martin's Paperbacks
- Pages: 293
- Awards: Anthony Award for Best First Novel (2007)
- ISBN: 978-0-312-94855-9
- Followed by: A Fatal Grace
- Website: Still Life

Still Life is the debut novel written by Louise Penny and published by St. Martin's Paperbacks on 1 July 2005. This novel won the Anthony Award for Best First Novel in 2007. It is the first in a series of mystery novels featuring Chief Inspector Armand Gamache and set in Quebec.

The story was adapted into a television film called Still Life: A Three Pines Mystery in 2013.

== Plot ==
A body is found in the woods near a small town called Three Pines. Inspector Gamache and his homicide team are sent to investigate.

== See also ==
- W. H. Auden
- United Empire Loyalist
- Francophones vs. Anglophones
- Matthew 10:36
- Oscar Wilde
