= Bury Your Dead (novel) =

Canadian mystery novel

- Author: Louise Penny
- Genre: Mystery fiction, Crime
- Published: 2010
- Publisher: Minotaur Books
- Pages: 371
- Awards: Anthony Award for Best Novel (2011)
- ISBN: 978-0-312-37704-5
- Preceded by: The Brutal Telling
- Followed by: A Trick of the Light
- Website: Bury Your Dead

Bury Your Dead is a book written by Louise Penny and published by Minotaur Books (an imprint of St. Martin's Press, owned by Macmillan Publishers) on 28 September 2010. This novel won the Anthony Award for Best Crime Novel and the Agatha Award for Best Mystery Novel in 2011. It is the sixth mystery novel featuring Chief Inspector Armand Gamache and set in Quebec.

== Plot summary ==
Between The Brutal Telling and Bury Your Dead, there was a shooting of one of the agents in the homicide division (which is told in flashbacks). While Gamache is doing research in Quebec City, a body is found in the sub-basement of a library. Gamache becomes a consultant of the investigation. Meanwhile, the murder investigated in The Brutal Telling is investigated further.

== See also ==
- Old Quebec City
- Literary & Historical Society of Quebec
- Samuel de Champlain
- Plains of Abraham
- Louis-Joseph de Montcalm
- James Wolfe
- Captain Cook
- Montcalm's aide-de-camp, Bougainville
- Ice Canoe Challenge
