= They Died in Vain =

2002 book by Jim Huang

They Died in Vain: Overlooked, Underappreciated and Forgotten Mystery Novels
- Author: Jim Huang
- Subject: Crime novels
- Published: 2002
- Publisher: Crum Creek Press
- Pages: 188
- Awards: Anthony Award for Best Critical Work (2003)
- ISBN: 978-0-962-58047-5
- Website: They Died in Vain

They Died in Vain: Overlooked, Underappreciated and Forgotten Mystery Novels is a 2002 book by Jim Huang. Published by Crum Creek Press, it won the Anthony Award for Best Critical Work in 2003.
