= Twisted City (novel) =

Novel by Jason Starr

- Author: Jason Starr
- Genre: Mystery fiction, Crime
- Published: 2004
- Publisher: Vintage Crime/Black Lizard
- Pages: 243
- Awards: Anthony Award for Best Paperback Original (2005)
- ISBN: 978-1-400-07506-5
- Website: Twisted City

Twisted City is a novel written by Jason Starr and published by Vintage Crime/Black Lizard in July 2004, which later went on to win the Anthony Award for Best Paperback Original in 2005.
