= Mystery Muses =

2006 book by Jim Huang and Austin Lugar

- Author: Jim Huang, Austin Lugar
- Published: 2006
- Publisher: Crum Creek Press
- Media type: Print
- Pages: 224
- Awards: Anthony Award for Best Critical Nonfiction (2007)
- ISBN: 978-0-962-58049-9
- Website: Mystery Muses

Mystery Muses: 100 Classics That Inspire Today's Mystery Writers is a book co-authored and edited by Jim Huang & Austin Lugar, published by Crum Creek Press on 1 August 2006.

The book won the Anthony Award for Best Critical Nonfiction in 2007.
