= A Trick of the Light =

2011 novel by Louise Penny

- First edition
- Author: Louise Penny
- Genre: Mystery fiction
- Published: 2011
- Publisher: Minotaur Books
- Pages: 352
- Awards: Anthony Award for Best Novel (2012)
- ISBN: 978-0-312-65545-7
- Preceded by: Bury Your Dead
- Followed by: The Beautiful Mystery
- Website: A Trick of the Light

A Trick of the Light is a book written by Louise Penny and published by Minotaur Books on 30 August 2011. It is the seventh mystery novel featuring Chief Inspector Armand Gamache and set in Quebec.

This novel won the Anthony Award for Best Novel in 2012.

== Plot summary ==
Artist Clara Morrow has a solo show, her first, at the modern art museum in Montréal. There is a vernissage at the museum the night before the public opening followed by a party organized by her husband Peter at their home in Three Pines. The next morning Peter and neighbor Olivier, carrying the newspapers with reviews of her solo show, see a woman dressed for a party lying dead in the back garden. They call the police. The murder is investigated by Chief Inspector Armand Gamache and his crew of investigators.

As each party had a long guest list, there are many possible suspects. No one saw the woman at either party, and the Morrows do not recognize her. The police find her car nearby and learn her name. She is Lillian Dyson, whom Clara knew over twenty years earlier in art college, a best friend who ended their friendship. She does not look the same.

Police learn that Lillian Dyson had been in New York City for years and had recently returned to Montréal. She had joined Alcoholics Anonymous (AA) and had a sponsor. Both Lillian and her sponsor Suzanne were artists who do not enjoy the success Clara now has. Lillian had been an art critic for a local newspaper soon after art college; she wrote highly critical reviews of the work of at least two women back then, Clara and Suzanne, making enemies in the art world of Quebec. Suzanne had been destroyed by the reviews, worked as a waitress, and after her most painful time, joined AA. With so many years in AA, Suzanne had developed the strength to forgive Lillian and did so.

Lillian was painting again, keeping her works in her small apartment. When Gamache sees the paintings, he thinks they are good work, though quite different from Clara’s paintings in style. Gamache shows photos of Lillian’s paintings to Thérèse Brunel for her assessment of their quality. The two then talk of the possibility of the violent event of six months earlier as possibly being an in-house set up.

Suzanne comes to Three Pines after Gamache finds her at an AA meeting, and she fills in Lillian’s story. At that AA meeting, Gamache sees an important judge in attendance. He became alcoholic after his young granddaughter was killed by a drunk driver. The judge joined AA when that guilty driver left prison and came for forgiveness to the judge’s home.

A side plot has Inspector Jean Guy Beauvoir getting hooked on pain killers and steadily denying it, as he relives the past violent scene by watching a video made from police body cameras. He was shot in that earlier case and is not dealing with the physical or emotional effects of such violence well. Gamache orders him to continue supportive treatment at the end of the novel.

Sifting the evidence collected by Agent Lacoste, it becomes clear to Gamache that one of the three art dealers, each seeking to represent Clara, is the murderer. Denis Fortin feels wronged by Clara and by Lillian. Each might have been the hot new artist to save his faltering business. He has only himself to blame.

Fortin sees a chance to get back at both by giving Lillian directions to Clara’s home for the night of the party. Lillian jumps ahead in the 12-step program, to the ninth step of asking forgiveness, long before she has the strength for the task, finding those she wronged, including Fortin. She had written a mean review of Fortin’s art works, turning him from artist to art dealer in her time as art critic. She eagerly accepts his invitation to meet Clara at her party, as Clara is on Lillian’s list of people she wants to ask forgiveness.

Lillian approaches the home from the back; her supposed friend meets her and kills her in the garden. Fortin’s notion is that this murder happening at her home will ruin Clara’s reputation. Fortin is charged with murder.

Clara and Peter are married over 20 years. Peter has trouble accepting his wife’s sudden success. They talk. At the end of the story they agree to part for one year, to meet in Three Pines for dinner to see what comes next.

== Characters ==
- Clara Morrow, artist
- Peter Morrow, her husband and also an artist whose paintings sell
- Chief Inspector Armand Gamache
- Reine-Marie Gamache, wife of Armand
- Inspector Jean Guy Beauvoir, second in command
- Agent Isabelle Lacoste
- Dr. Sharon Harris, coroner
- Thérèse Brunel, head of Property Crime at the Sureté, art historian
- Jerome Brunel, her husband, retired doctor and expert in decrypting codes
- Chief Superintendent Sylvain Francoeur, above Gamache and his apparent active enemy
- Suzanne, sponsor of Lillian Dyson in AA, once a painter
- Lillian Dyson, long estranged childhood and art school friend of Clara, the murder victim.
- François Marois, art dealer
- André Castonguay, art gallery owner
- Denis Fortin, owner of Galerie Fortin
- Myrna Landers, book seller in Three Pines and close friend of Clara
- Gabri Dubeau, owner and operator of the B&B and Bistro in Three Pines, and friend of Clara and Peter
- Olivier Brulé, partner of Gabri, wrongly found guilty of murder in an earlier novel, now released, found innocent of that crime; also a friend of the Morrows
- Ruth Zardo, 80 year old poet, sharp-tongued drunk who lives in Three Pines. She posed for one of Clara’s masterpiece paintings.
- Judge Thierry Pineault, Chief Judge of Quebec Supreme Court, also in AA
- Brian, young tattoed man in AA who is sponsor of Thierry; he had been in prison for killing Thierry’s granddaughter while driving, and is on a new path

== See Also ==
- Not Waving but Drowning - poem by Stevie Smith
- Chiaroscuro
- Twelve-step program
- Not with a Club - poem by Emily Dickinson
- Maigret
