= Edward Conlon =

American author and former New York Police Department officer

Edward W. Conlon
- Born: 1965 (age 60–61)
- Education: Harvard
- Police career
- Department: NYPD
- Service years: 1995 - 2011
- Status: Retired
- Rank: Detective
- Other work: author
- Website: http://www.edwardconlon.com

Edward W. Conlon (born 1965) is an American author and former New York Police Department (NYPD) officer.

== Biography ==
Born in the Bronx, Conlon spent most of his childhood in nearby Yonkers, and attended Regis High School. He graduated from Harvard in 1987, then traveled abroad in the former Yugoslavia and worked as a liaison for an alternative sentencing organization in Brooklyn.

In 1995 Conlon joined the New York Police Department. Conlon's police experience focused on patrolling city-owned public housing developments, as well as arresting street-level drug dealers after observing their sales from surveillance posts. In 2002, he was promoted to the rank of detective and was assigned to the Bronx's 44th Precinct. He retired as a Detective Second Grade in 2011 after 16 years with the department.

Conlon rejoined the NYPD in 2018 in the newly created role of director of executive communications in the NYPD Commissioner's office. After finishing The Policewomen's Bureau he again wanted to be a policeman, Conlon said. While he writes some official public releases, Conlon also authors long-form journalism articles for the department, and hosts a true crime podcast interviewing NYPD officers about past cases. As of 2022, Conlon narrates a podcast titled “Talk to Me” about the history of hostage negotiation.

== Works ==
After college Conlon wrote a novel which remains unsubmitted and unpublished. His first published article for The New Yorker was "To the Potter's Field" (1993), a bleak piece about Hart Island, New York. After joining the NYPD, Conlon wrote the Cop's Diary column for The New Yorker from 1997 to 2000 under the pen name Marcus Laffey. In the Sept 12. 2011 issue of The New Yorker, Conlon wrote a piece in the Talk of the Town section titled "Paying Attention" about 9/11 and his final days with the NYPD detective unit. He plans to continue writing.

=== Blue Blood ===
The column resulted in a nearly $1 million advance for Blue Blood (2004), which covers Conlon's years in the NYPD, his work conducting street-level narcotics enforcement in the Housing Bureau, his family's law enforcement background, and various anecdotes about the history of policing. The book received a favorable review on the cover of The New York Times Book Review, debuted at #9 on the Times Best Seller list, and remained on the list for two weeks.

=== Red on Red ===
Conlon turned to fiction with this novel of police life that strays from actual NYPD investigative practice. Nick Meehan, a New York City detective slipping into mid-career burnout, is assigned a special case for Internal Affairs to investigate a suspected dirty cop. Meehan and his new detective partner, Esposito, look into a variety of other cases, including the apparent suicide of a recently arrived Mexican immigrant woman, gangland slayings by rival drug dealers (called "red on red" or criminal on criminal killings), and a serial rapist. In between writing about crime, Conlon's book examines the personal lives of his two main characters, the alliances and loyalties, the emotional tolls, the temptations, the shades of gray inherent to police work. The pace may be slower than the average thriller, but this novel was targeted to appeal to readers of literary crime writers such as George Pelecanos, Dennis Lehane, and Richard Price.

== Bibliography ==
- Blue Blood (New York: Riverhead, 2004) ISBN 1-59448-073-7
- Red on Red (New York: Spiegel & Grau, 2011) ISBN 978-0-385-51917-5
- How to Be an NYPD Drugs Cop: Lives Less Ordinary (United Kingdom: Ebury Publishing, 2011) ISBN 978-1-446-49036-5
- The Policewomen's Bureau: A Novel (United States: Skyhorse Publishing, 2019) ISBN 978-1-948-92408-5
