= Ken Bruen =

Irish crime fiction writer (1951–2025)

- Born: 3 January 1951; Galway, Ireland
- Died: 29 March 2025 (aged 74); Galway, Ireland
- Occupation: Novelist
- Writing career
- Genres: Crime fiction, thrillers
- Movements: Modern crime fiction, Noir

Ken Bruen (3 January 1951 – 29 March 2025) was an Irish writer of hardboiled and noir crime fiction.

== Life and career ==
=== Education and teaching career ===
Born in Galway on 3 January 1951, he was educated at Gormanston College, County Meath and later at Trinity College Dublin, where he earned a PhD in metaphysics.

Bruen spent twenty-five years as an English teacher in Africa, Japan, S.E. Asia and South America. His travels were hazardous at times, including a stint in a Brazilian jail.

=== Writing career ===
Bruen was part of a literary circle that also included Jason Starr, Reed Farrel Coleman, and Allan Guthrie.

His works included the well-received White Trilogy and The Guards. In 2006, Hard Case Crime released Bust, a collaboration between Bruen and New York crime author Jason Starr. Bruen's short story "Words Are Cheap" (2006) appears in the first issue of Murdaland. He also edited an anthology of stories set in Dublin, Dublin Noir. Jack Taylor's informant, named China, was a nod of the head by Ken Bruen to author Alan Hunter's original informant character named China, in the George Gently series of novels, first published in 1955. Bruen was also the recipient of the first David Loeb Goodis Award (2008) for his dedication to his art.

Other works of note include The Killing of the Tinkers, The Magdalen Martyrs, The Dramatist and Priest, all part of his Jack Taylor series, which began with The Guards. Set in Galway, the series relates the adventures and misadventures of a disgraced former police officer working as a haphazard private investigator whose life has been marred by alcoholism and drug abuse. It chronicled the social change in Ireland in Bruen's own lifetime, paying particular attention to the decline of the Catholic Church as a social and political power. Themes also explored included Ireland's economic prosperity from the mid-1990s onwards, although it is often portrayed as a force which has left Ireland as a materialistic and spiritually drained society which still harbours deep social inequality. Immigration is also a theme to be found in these works.

=== Death ===
Bruen died in Galway on 29 March 2025, at the age of 74.

== Literary awards ==
Bruen was the recipient of many awards: the Shamus Award in 2007 (The Dramatist) and 2004 (The Guards), both for Best P.I. Hardcover; Macavity Award in 2005 (The Killing of the Tinkers) and 2010 (Tower, cowritten by Reed Farrel Coleman), both for Best Mystery Novel; Barry Award in 2007 (Priest) for Best British Crime Novel; the Grand Prix de Literature Policiere in 2007 (Priest) for Best International Crime Novel. He was also a finalist for the Edgar Award in 2004 (The Guards) and 2008 (Priest), both for Best Novel.

== Adaptations ==
Beginning in 2010, nine of the Jack Taylor novels were made into a TV series starring Iain Glen in the title role.

His Brants and Roberts novel Blitz was adapted into a 2011 film of the same name, starring Jason Statham, Paddy Considine and Aidan Gillen.

Bruen's 2014 novel Merrick was adapted for TV as the series 100 Code, starring Dominic Monaghan and Michael Nyqvist.

His 2001 novel, London Boulevard, was adapted for the big screen in 2010 and starred Keira Knightley, Colin Farrell, David Thewlis and Ray Winstone.

== Published works ==
=== Non-series (including collections of stories) ===
- Funeral: Tales of Irish Morbidities (1991)
- Shades of Grace (1993)
- Martyrs (1994)
- Sherry and Other Stories (1994)
- All the Old Songs and Nothing to Love (1994)
- The Time of Serena-May & Upon the Third Cross (1994)
- Rilke on Black (1996)
- The Hackman Blues (1997)
- Her Last Call to Louis MacNeice (1998)
- London Boulevard (2001)
- Dispatching Baudelaire (2004)
- American Skin (2006)
- A Fifth of Bruen: Early Fiction of Ken Bruen (2006) (collection including Funeral: Tales of Irish Morbidities (1991); Shades of Grace (1993); Martyrs (1994); Sherry and Other Stories (1994); All the Old Songs and Nothing to Love (1994); and The Time of Serena-May & Upon the Third Cross (1994)
- Once Were Cops (2008)
- Killer Year (2008)
- Merrick (2014)
- Callous (2021)

=== Jack Taylor ===
- The Guards (2001) – 2004 Shamus Award for Best Novel; Finalist 2004 Edgar Award for Best Mystery Novel; Finalist 2004 Macavity Award for Best Novel
- The Killing of the Tinkers (2002) – 2005 Macavity Award for Best Novel; Finalist 2005 Anthony Award for Best Novel
- The Magdalen Martyrs (2003)
- The Dramatist (2004) – 2007 Shamus Award for Best Novel
- Priest (2006) – 2007 Barry Award for Best British Novel; Finalist 2008 Edgar Award for Best Mystery Novel
- Cross (2007)
- Sanctuary (2008)
- The Devil (2010)
- Headstone (2011)
- Purgatory (Aug 2013)
- Green Hell (July 2015)
- The Emerald Lie (September 2016)
- The Ghosts of Galway (November 2017)
- In the Galway Silence (November 2018)
- Galway Girl (November 2019)
- A Galway Epiphany (November 2020)
- Galway Confidential (March 2024)
- Galway's Edge (March 2025)

=== Detective Sergeant Tom Brant and Chief Inspector James Roberts ===
- A White Arrest (1998)
- Taming the Alien (1999)
- The McDead (2000)
- Blitz (2002), adapted for the 2011 British crime thriller film Blitz starring Jason Statham
- Vixen (2003)
- Calibre (2006)
- Ammunition (2007)

=== Max Fisher and Angela Petrakos ===
- Bust (2006) – Finalist 2007 Barry Award for Best Paperback
- Slide (2007) – Finalist 2008 Anthony Award for Best Paperback Original
- The Max (2008)
- Pimp (2016)
