= Robert Fate =

American author

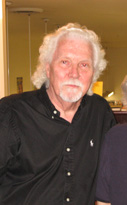
- Born: Robert Fate Bealmear; 1935 (age 90–91); Oklahoma City, Oklahoma, U.S.
- Occupation: Writer
- Spouse: Fern Mador Bealmear
- Children: Jennifer Marie Bealmear
- Writing career
- Genre: Mystery
- Notable work: "Baby Shark"
- Notable awards: Technical Achievement Oscar 1984
- Website: www.robertfate.com

Robert Fate (born Robert Fate Bealmear, 1935) is an American author, best known for the Baby Shark series of mystery novels.

Born in 1935 in Oklahoma City, Oklahoma, Fate joined the US Marine Corps after High School. He used his GI Bill to go to schools in the US as well as the Sorbonne in Paris.

Before becoming a writer he worked in various fields and won an Oscar for his work in motion picture special effects

== Awards ==
For the Baby Shark series

- 2008 Anthony award Finalist
- Book of the Year Finalist, Foreword Magazine
- Editor's Choice Award Finalist, Allbooks Review
- Optioned by Brad Wyman

== Bibliography ==
- Baby Shark (2006) ISBN 0-9776276-9-1
- Baby Shark’s Beaumont Blues (2007) ISBN 0-9776276-2-4
- Baby Shark’s High Plains Redemption (2008) ISBN 0-9799960-2-3
- Baby Shark's Jugglers at the Border (2009) ISBN 978-0-9799960-5-4
- 'Kill the Gigolo' ' (2010)
- Baby Shark's Showdown at Chigger Flats (2011)
