= Damage Done (novel) =

2010 novel by Hilary Davidson

The Damage Done
- First edition
- Author: Hilary Davidson
- Genre: Mystery fiction, Crime
- Published: 2010
- Publisher: Forge Books
- Pages: 352
- Awards: Anthony Award for Best First Novel (2011)
- ISBN: 978-0-765-32697-3
- Website: The Damage Done

The Damage Done is a book written by Hilary Davidson. and published by Forge Books on 28 September 2010, which later went on to win the Anthony Award for Best First Novel in 2011.
