= Sûreté du Québec =

Provincial Police Force of Quebec

- Badge of the SQ

- Coat of arms of the SQ

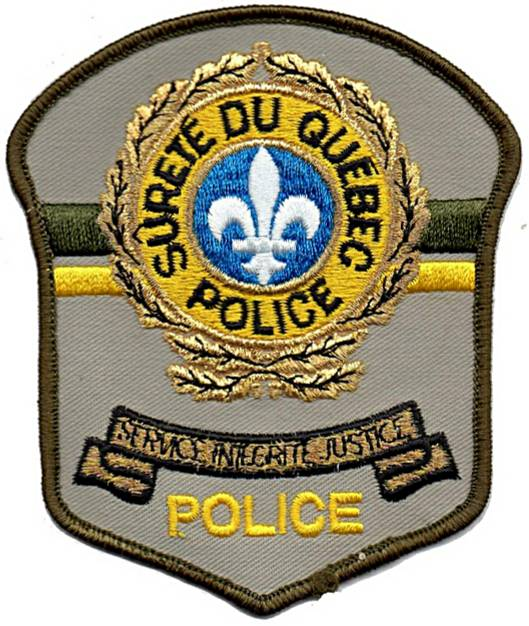
- Patch of the SQ
- Abbreviation: SQ
- Motto: Service, Intégrité, Justice; Service, Integrity, Justice

Agency overview
- Formed: May 1, 1870

Jurisdictional structure
- Operations jurisdiction: Quebec, Canada
- Area: 1,542,056 km^{2}
- Population: 8,484,965

Operational structure
- Overseen by: Ministry of Public Security of Quebec
- Headquarters: 1701, rue Parthenais; Montreal, Quebec; H2K 3S7 45.52858750783238°N 73.55259783454248°W
- Officers: 5,700
- Minister responsible: Guy Lapointe Jr., Minister of Public Security
- Agency executive: Johanne Beausoleil, Director-general
- Districts: 10

Website
- www.sq.gouv.qc.ca

The Sûreté du Québec (SQ; French: [syʁte dy kebɛk], lit. 'Safety of Quebec') is the provincial police service for the Canadian province of Quebec. There is no official English name, though the agency's name is sometimes translated as Quebec Provincial Police (QPP) and Quebec Police Force (QPF) in English-language sources. The headquarters of the Sûreté du Québec are located on Parthenais Street in Montreal's Sainte-Marie neighbourhood, and the service employs over 5,700 officers. The SQ is one of three provincial police services in Canada, alongside the larger Ontario Provincial Police and smaller Royal Newfoundland Constabulary, and the third-largest police service in Canada (behind the Royal Canadian Mounted Police and the Ontario Provincial Police).

== Function ==
The primary function of the Sûreté du Québec (SQ) is to enforce provincial laws, some municipal bylaws, the federal Criminal Code and many other laws throughout Quebec, and to assist municipal police services when needed.

At the local level, the SQ is responsible for providing local police services to municipalities that chose not to have their own police department (mostly localities with populations under 50,000), in exchange for payment relative to their size. In other cities, the Sûreté du Québec can also take over criminal investigations from municipal police services when required by the Police Act of the province, according to the severity of the crime and the size of the population (e.g., the SQ will take in charge any homicide with no imminent arrests in a city of less than 250,000, even if it has its own police department). The SQ is usually present in smaller, rural or suburban communities, and it is not usually visible on the streets of large urban centres like Montreal and Quebec City, whose own police departments must provide a wide range of services and operations by law. In those cities, however, the SQ still has large offices where various investigations are conducted.

At the provincial level, the SQ is responsible for actions such as patrolling the highways of Quebec, preserving the integrity of governmental institutions, coordinating large-scale investigations (such as during the biker war in the 1990s), and maintaining and sharing the criminal intelligence database of Quebec with other services. In addition, the SQ can provide technical assistance to Quebec's independent investigation unit (BEI) in any incident involving possible wrongdoing by another police department, such as deaths and serious injuries. Should the SQ be involved in such an incident, assistance (if needed) will be provided either by the police service of Montreal or of Quebec City.

== History ==
On February 1, 1870, the Quebec provincial government created the Police provinciale du Québec under the direction of its first commissioner, Judge Pierre-Antoine Doucet. This new service took over the headquarters of the Quebec City municipal police, which were then disbanded, although the city relaunched a municipal service in 1877.

In 1900, two distinct provincial police services were created: the Office of Provincial Detectives of Montreal, in response to a crime wave in that city, and the Revenue Police, whose mission was to collect taxes. In 1902, the government decided that the provincial police should no longer be directed by a judge but by an officer of the police themselves. Augustin McCarthy was chosen as the first chief drawn from the ranks of the police.

In 1922, two headquarters were established, one in Quebec City, headed by McCarthy, and one in Montreal, headed by Dieudonné Daniel Lorrain. The Office of Provincial Detectives of Montreal became part of the general provincial police in that year. The Quebec division included 35 police officers and two detectives. In 1925, police officers started patrolling on motorcycles. In 1929 and 1930, the structure of the service was reformed and the agency adopted a new name as Sûreté provinciale du Québec which was later shortened to its present name.

=== Oka Crisis ===
A significant local, provincial, national and First Nations crisis erupted in 1990 after SQ officers attempted to enforce a court order on the Mohawks of Oka, Quebec. SQ Corporal Marcel Lemay was killed by gunfire in the initial raid (likely by friendly fire), and a 77-day standoff ensued.

=== Montebello incident ===
The Sûreté du Québec admitted in August 2007 that they had used undercover police posing as protestors at the 2007 Montebello Security and Prosperity Partnership of North America meetings. This admission was made after a video captured by protestors was widely circulated in the Canadian media and made available on YouTube. The video appeared to show one of the officers carrying a rock, suggesting that the police may have been acting as inciting agents by inciting violence.

== Chiefs and directors-general ==
- Pierre-Antoine Doucet (1870–1877)
- Jean-Baptiste Amyot (1877–1878)
- Alexandre Chauveau (1880–1899)
- Augustin McCarthy (1902–1932)
- Dieudonné Daniel Lorrain (1922–1928)
- Maurice-Charles Lalonde (1929–1936)
- Philippe Aubé (1936–1937)
- Philippe-Auguste Piuze (1937–1940)
- Marcel Gaboury (1940–1944)
- Joseph-Paul Lamarche (1944–1950)
- Hilaire Beauregard (1954–1960)
- Josaphat Brunet (1960–1965)
- J. Adrien Robert (1965–1968)
- Maurice St-Pierre (1969–1973)
- Paul-A. Benoît (1973–1974)
- Jacques Beaudoin (1974–1988)
- Robert Lavigne (1988–1995)
- Serge Barbeau (1995–1996)
- Guy Coulombe (1996–1998)
- Florent Gagné (1998–2003)
- Normand Proulx (2004–2008)
- Richard Deschesnes (2008–2012)
- Mario Laprise (2012–2014)
- Luc Fillion (interim, 2014)
- Martin Prud'Homme (2014–2018)
- Yves Morency (interim, 2017–2018)
- Martin Prud’Homme (2018–2019)
- Mario Bouchard (interim, 2019)
- Johanne Beausoleil (interim, 2019–2022)
- Johanne Beausoleil (2022–present)

== Districts ==
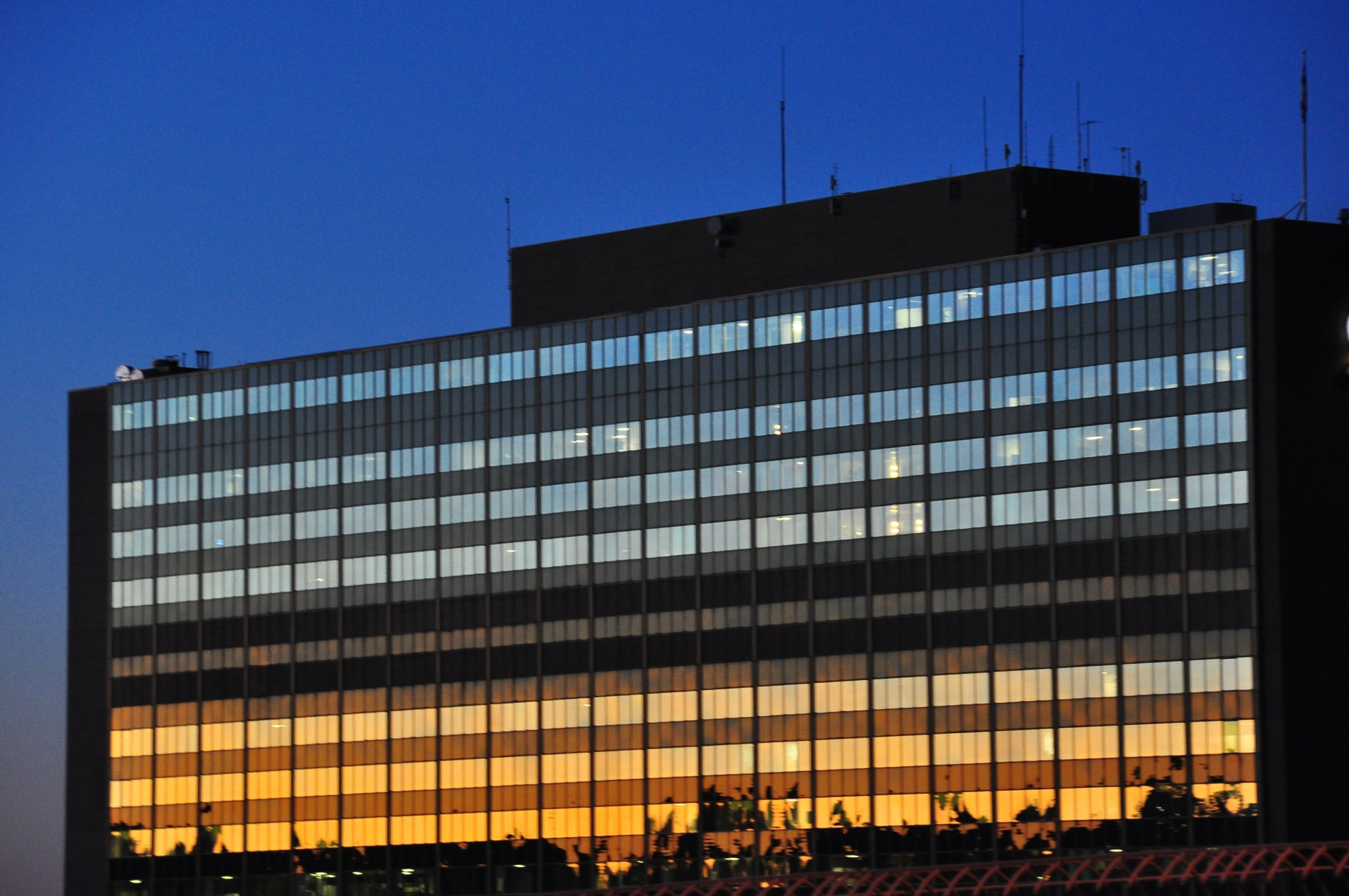
Upper floors of the SQ headquarters in Montreal.

1. Bas-Saint-Laurent-Gaspésie-Îles-de-la-Madeleine
2. Saguenay-Lac-Saint-Jean
3. Capitale-Nationale-Chaudière-Appalaches
4. Mauricie-Centre-du-Québec
5. Estrie
6. Montréal-Laval-Laurentides-Lanaudière
7. Outaouais
8. Abitibi-Témiscamingue-Nord-du-Québec
9. Côte-Nord
10. Montérégie

== Rank badges ==
Rank insignia of the Sûreté du Québec are contained on slip-on sleeves, worn on the epaulettes of uniform jacket or shirt shoulders.

Constables (Agent) do not have any insignia on their uniform. The SQ formerly had the rank of Corporal above Constable rank. Team leaders have an epaulette with the words Chef d'équipe.

Ranks of Sûreté du Québec
General staff officers		Officers				Sub-Officers	Agents	
Directeur general	Directeur adjoint	Inspecteur chef	Inspecteur	Capitaine	Lieutenant	Sergent	Chef d'equipe	Constable
Director general of the SQ	Associate director	Chief Inspector	Inspector	Captain	Lieutenant	Sergeant	Team Leader	Constable
								No insignia

== Uniforms ==
Early uniforms were British in origin, including the use of the custodian helmet, with the kepi later added as well. The service adopted a uniform with a more distinct green tone, as well as a peaked cap, in the 1960s.

The emblem of the service changed in the 1970s, when the old provincial coat of arms gave way to the fleur-de-lis.

In late 2016, Martin Prud'Homme, Director General of the SQ, announced the uniforms would be changed. Shirts and coats will be of a darker shade of olive green; patches, caps, and bulletproof vests will become black, and pants blue-black. One of the justifications for the changes was that the old green uniform was too similar to that of a soldier's.

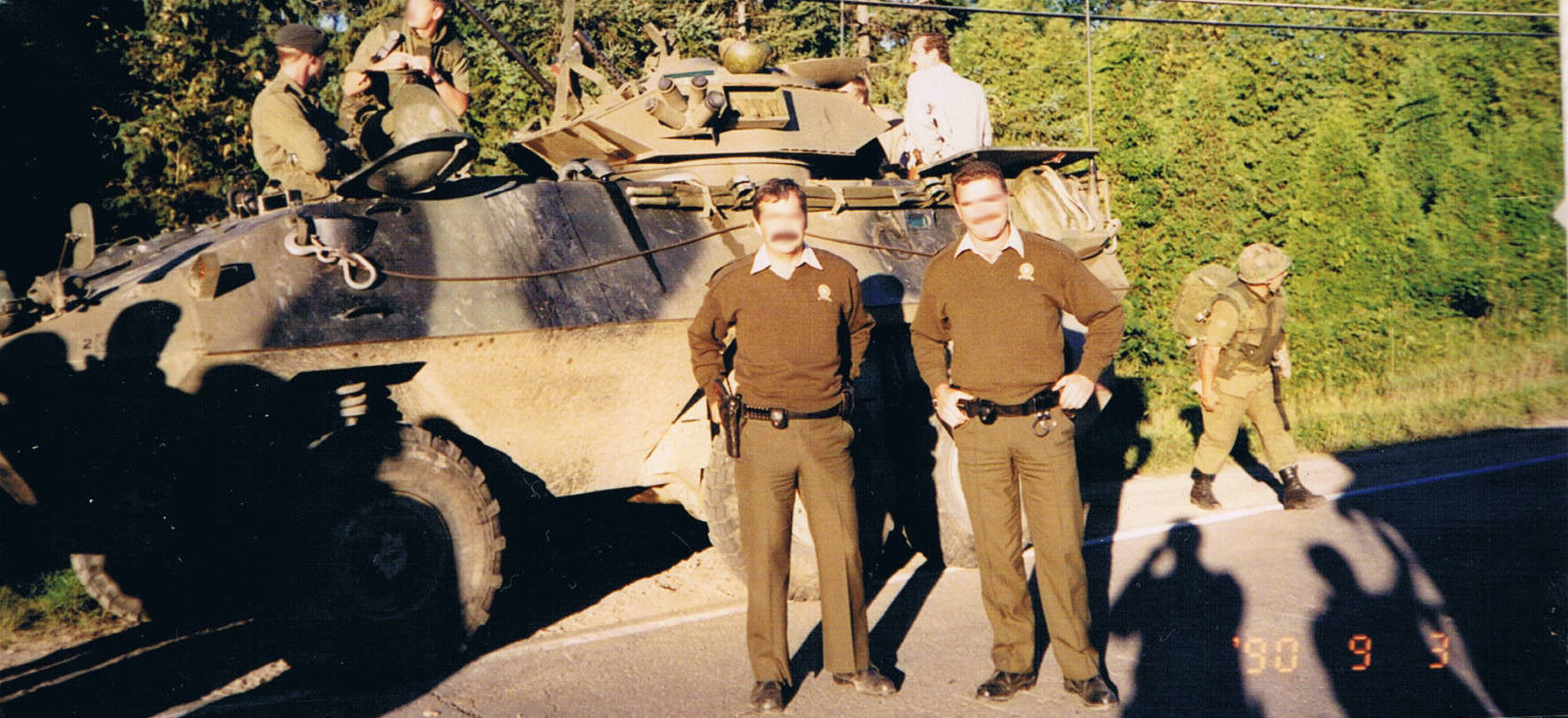
Uniform of early 1990s, during the Oka Crisis

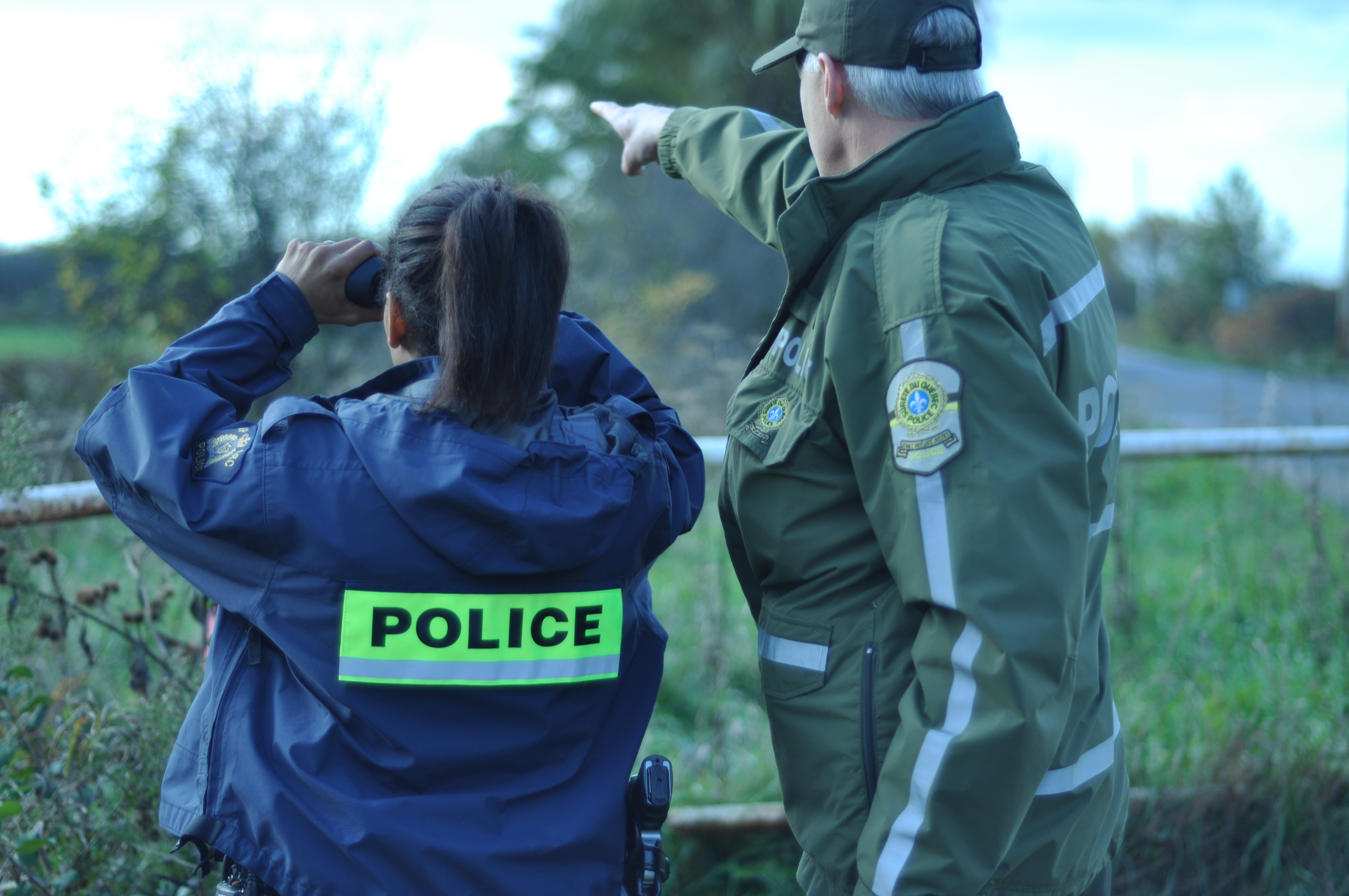
An SQ agent with a pre-2016 uniform observing the border with an RCMP officer

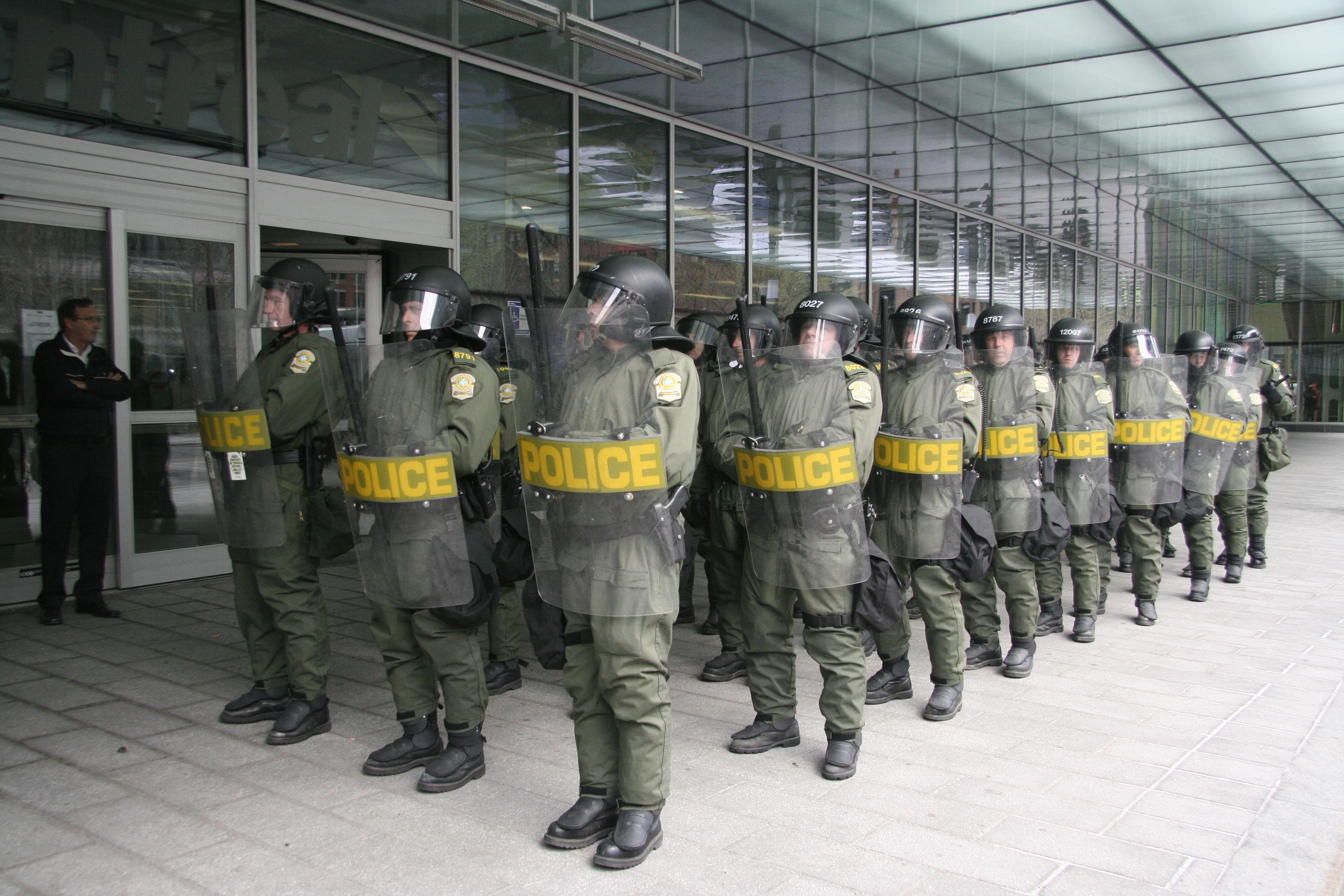
Riot gear (2012 student protests, Montreal)

== Fleet ==
Beginning progressively in 2017, marked patrol cars are set to become black with white doors, on which the word "POLICE" will be more evident.

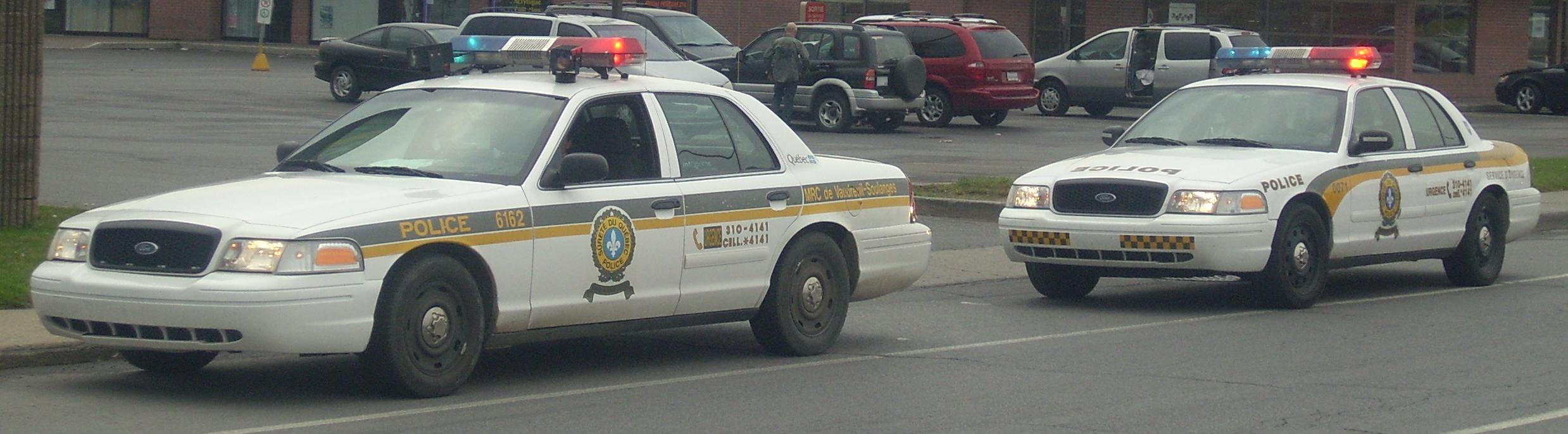
A pair of SQ Ford Crown Victoria Police Interceptors in 2008; the one on the left is in the pre-2005 livery design and the one on the right is in the post-2005 design used until 2017.

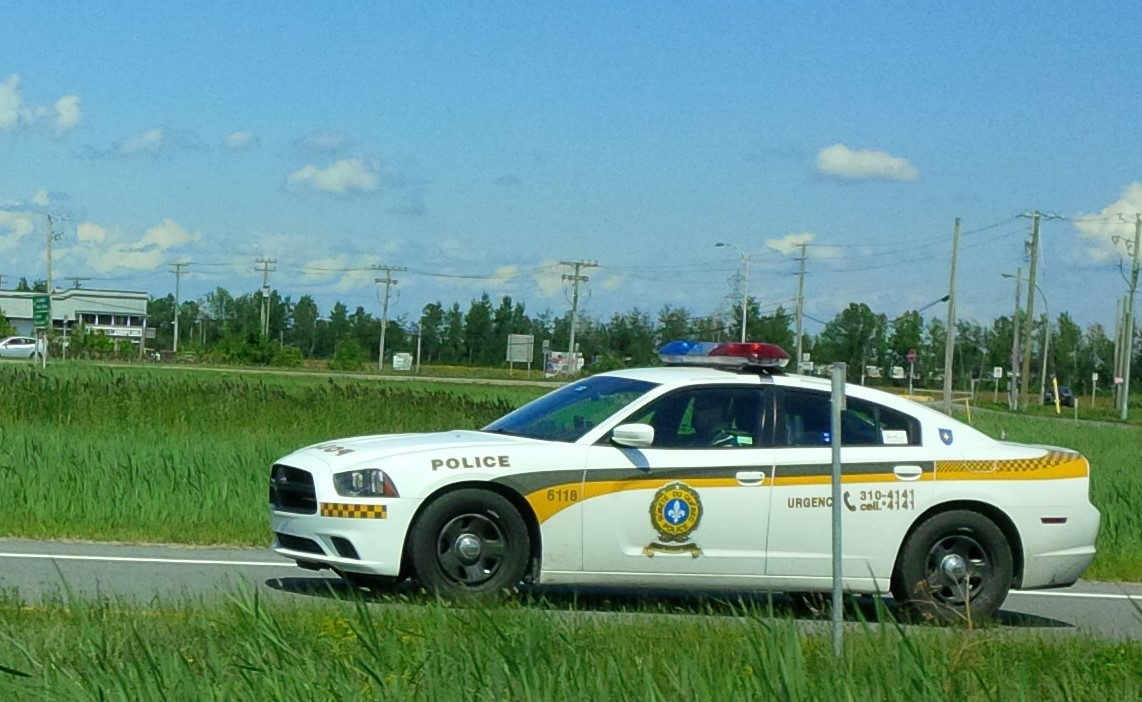
An SQ Dodge Charger in 2015, using the SQ's pre-2017 styling.

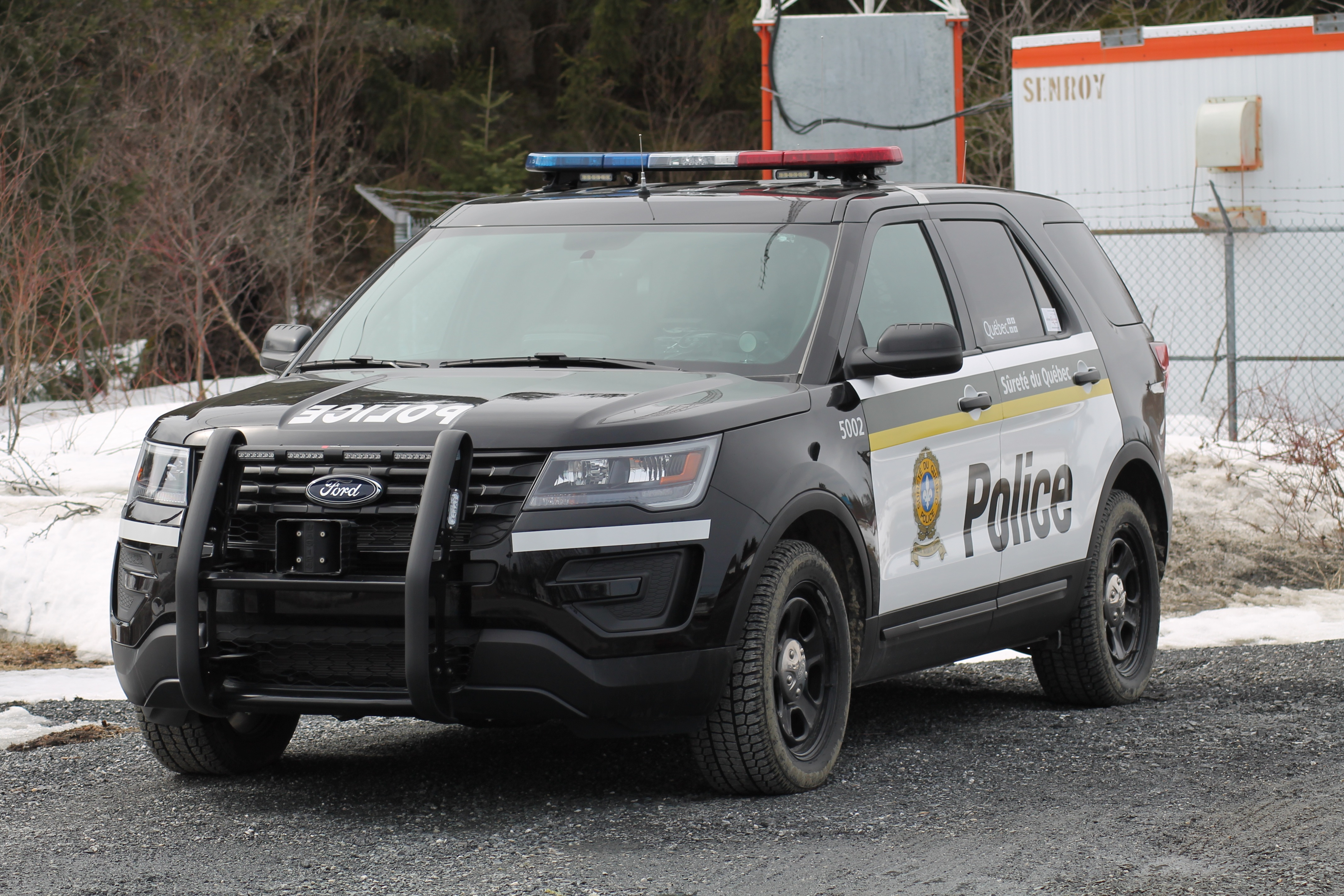
SQ Ford Police Interceptor Utility with post-2017 styling.

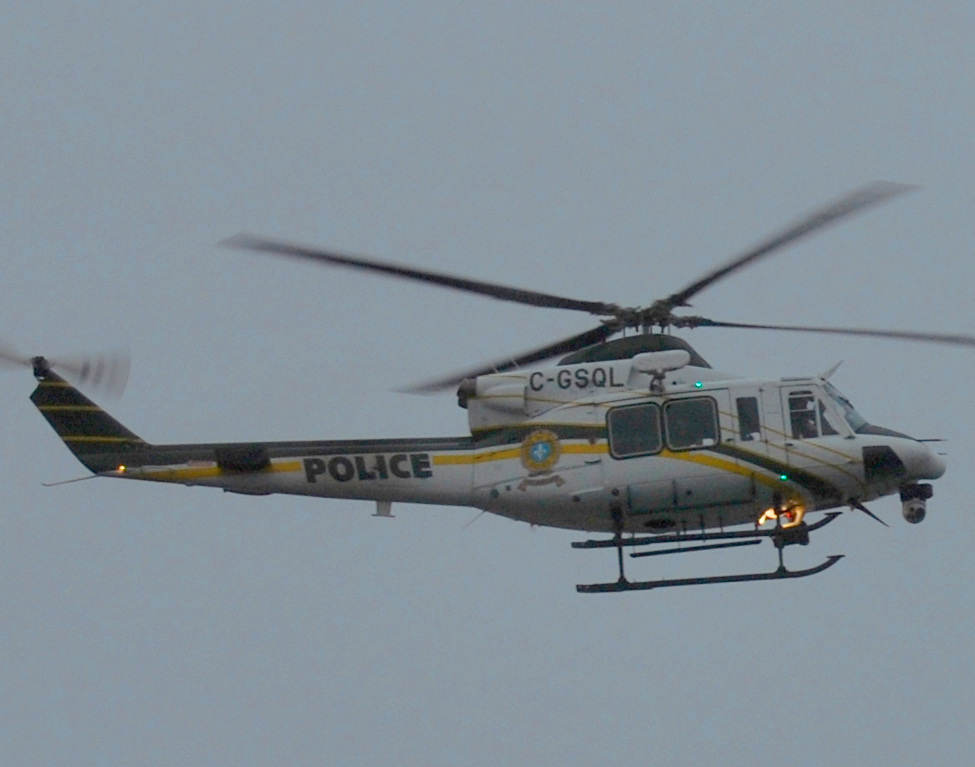
An SQ helicopter during the 2012 student protests

Cars:

- Chevrolet Impala
- Chevrolet Tahoe
- Dodge Charger
- Ford Police Interceptor Utility
- Ford Taurus

Trucks:

- Dodge Dakota
- Ford E-250
- Ford F-350
- Ford F-450
- Ram 2500 pickup

Motorcycles:

- BMW police motorcycle
- Mikado bicycles

Special Vehicles:

- Prevost Car Command Post
- Hummer H1 armoured truck
- International 7500 support vehicle
- APC
- Cambli International Thunder 1 ARV (with International 7500 chassis)

Air:

- Bell 206
- Bell 206 LT
- Bell 412

Sea:

- Doral patrol boat
- Bombardier Sea-doo

Wild:

- Bombardier Ski-doo snowmobile
- Grizzly ATV

== Equipment ==
The standard-issue weapon of the SQ are the Glock series of pistols, specifically the ones chambered in 9×19mm Parabellum. Various models have been adopted, such as the usual Glock 17 Gen 3, the compact Glock 19, and sub-compact Glock 26. Tactical officers have used the C8CQB rifle, a variant of the Colt Canada C8 rifle.

Prior to introduction of Glock pistols, officers carried .357 Magnum revolvers. These were replaced with the Glock 17 in 2001.

=== Licence Plate Recognition System ===
The SQ has been using the LPRS systems since 2009. The objective of the LPRS is to make the streets and highways safer by removing vehicles not authorized to be on the road. The hotlist plate database can consist of the following types:

- unregistered plate (not paid at DMV/SAAQ)
- stolen vehicles
- Amber alert
- wanted vehicles

The LPRS are installed on 10 Sûreté du Québec vehicles. The LPRS integrator is Gtechna. Gtechna is primarily a citations issuance and management software developer which integrates mission critical technologies such as Licence Plate Recognition (LPR) to streamline the enforcement of moving and parking violations.

== In popular culture ==
The Sûreté du Québec has become well known internationally through the fictional Chief Inspector Armand Gamache and his colleagues, created by Canadian author Louise Penny, who lives in Quebec. Penny's works have been recognized in Quebec by her being made a Member of the Order of Quebec.

In the 2014 film Tusk, Johnny Depp plays the role of Guy LaPointe, a twenty-year veteran former Sûreté du Québec inspector now hunting serial killer Howard Howe.

The Three Pines series on Amazon Prime Video, inspired by the books, also includes characters who are police officers with the Sûreté du Québec, including Gamache.

Author Kathy Reichs also created a fictional character named Lieutenant-Detective Andrew Ryan who is an homicide investigator with the Surete du Quebec. He is the romantic interest of Professor Temperance Brennan in the book series on which the television series "Bones" was based.

== See also ==
- Service de police de la Ville de Montréal
