= Three Pines =

2022 mystery television series

- Genre: Mystery; Detective; Crime drama
- Created by: Emilia di Girolamo
- Based on: Inspector Gamache by Louise Penny
- Starring: Alfred Molina; Rossif Sutherland; Elle-Máijá Tailfeathers; Tantoo Cardinal; Clare Coulter; Sarah Booth; Anna Tierney
- Composer: Toydrum
- Countries of origin: Canada; United Kingdom
- Original languages: French; English
- No. of seasons: 1
- No. of episodes: 8

Production
- Executive producers: Andy Harries; Sharon Hughff; John Phillips; Sam Donovan; Emilia di Girolamo; Alfred Molina
- Producer: John Griffin
- Production location: Quebec
- Running time: 60 minutes
- Production companies: Left Bank Pictures; Amazon Studios; Sony Pictures Television

Original release
- Network: Amazon Prime Video
- Release: 2 December – 23 December 2022

Three Pines is a mystery television series starring Alfred Molina based on the novel series by Louise Penny, centered on Chief Inspector Armand Gamache. It premiered on Amazon Prime Video on 2 December 2022 with four murder mysteries, each spanning two episodes. In March 2023, Three Pines was cancelled after one season.

== Premise ==
As reported by Peter White for Deadline Hollywood, Chief Inspector Armand

Gamache of the Sûreté du Québec [police force]... sees things that others do not: the light between the cracks, the mythic in the mundane, and the evil in the seemingly ordinary. As he investigates a spate of murders in Three Pines, a seemingly idyllic village [in the Eastern Townships of Quebec, Canada], he discovers long-buried secrets and faces a few of his own ghosts.

In contrast to the books, the series includes a secondary storyline throughout the season, with Gamache investigating the disappearance of a young woman.

== Cast ==
=== Main ===
- Alfred Molina as Chief Inspector Armand Gamache of the Sûreté du Québec
- Rossif Sutherland as Jean-Guy Beauvoir
- Elle-Máijá Tailfeathers as Sergeant Isabelle Lacoste
- Tantoo Cardinal as Bea Mayer
- Clare Coulter as Ruth Zardo
- Sarah Booth as Yvette Nichol
- Anna Tierney as Clara Morrow
- Roberta Battaglia as Crie

=== Recurring ===
- Julian Bailey as Peter Morrow
- Frédéric-Antoine Guimond as Olivier Brule
- Pierre Simpson as Gabri Dubeau
- Tamara Brown as Myrna Landers
- Patricia Summersett as Angela Blake
- Marie-France Lambert as Gamache's wife Reine-Marie
- Frank Schorpion as Pierre Arnot
- Marcel Jeannin as General Director Francoeur
- Georgina Lightning as Arisawe Two-Rivers
- Crystle Lightning as Missy Two-Rivers
- Isabel Deroy-Olson as Kara Two-Rivers
- Anna Lambe as Blue Two-Rivers
- Marie-Josée Bélanger as Gamache's mother (flashbacks)
- Mylène Dinh-Robic as Sandra Morrow
- Laurence Leboeuf as Julia Morrow

== Episodes ==
No.	Title	Directed by	Written by	Original release date
1	"White Out - Part 1"	Sam Donovan	Emilia di Girolamo	2 December 2022
Chief Inspector Armand Gamache witnesses and subsequently stops police brutality against a family of women at a political demonstration for Missing and Murdered Indigenous Women. This earns him the displeasure of General Director Francoeur (Gamache's superior) and as punishment, he is dispatched to the remote village of Three Pines to solve the 'elaborate and public' murder of CC de Poitiers, a wealthy socialite. He soon discovers that everything is not as it seems and he has no shortage of suspects. In addition to this case, Gamache also begins to investigate the cold case of the disappearance of Blue Two-Rivers, an indigenous woman who now haunts his dreams.
2	"White Out - Part 2"	Sam Donovan	Emilia di Girolamo	2 December 2022
Gamache continues to investigate CC's murder, eventually solving it after uncovering her enigmatic and painful past and family history. Meanwhile, Gamache's relief at a breakthrough in the Blue Two-River's case is short-lived when her family rejects his version of events, leading Missy Two-Rivers (Blue's mother) to a desperate act.
3	"The Cruelest Month - Part 1"	Tracey Deer	Jamie Crichton	9 December 2022
Gamache returns to Three Pines to investigate the missing persons case of Marc Fortier, a resident of the village. A search of CC's now abandoned and vandalised home, a former Canadian Indian residential school named St. Anthony's, brings to light Marc's murder. Following a lead, Gamache finds a new suspect at Marc's secret cabin. Meanwhile, Gamache decides to continue to pursue Blue Two-River's closed case with the help of Sergeant Lacoste, despite Francoeur's disapproval and existing evidence to the contrary. Later, Lacoste discovers that a key piece of evidence in the Two-River's case was faked and visits Tommy's residence (Blue's childhood friend, who is also missing and was last seen with Blue in the faked photograph).
4	"The Cruelest Month - Part 2"	Tracey Deer	Jamie Crichton	9 December 2022
Gamache uncovers more of Three Pines's secrets and the villager's lies while investigating Marc's murder. The villagers hold a memorial after Gamache's discovery of the hidden and unmarked graves in St. Anthony's, following which Bea reveals details about an argument Marc was involved in earlier on the day of his murder. Gamache solves the murder after realising that Marc's killer had a very personal motive. Lacoste revisits Tommy's and his brother Kevin Kis's residence and discovers new evidence after an exhausting search, which eventually reopens the Blue Two-River case.
5	"The Murder Stone - Part 1"	Daniel Grou	Catherine Tregenna	16 December 2022
Gamache's wedding anniversary celebrations are interrupted by the discovery of Julia Morrow's body, the brand new heiress to the locally famous Manoir Belleforet hotel (formerly the home of the dysfunctional Morrow family). He and his team investigate the case with intense focus on the Morrow family. Gamache and Lacoste also continue to maintain interest in the Blue Two-River case and their new suspect Kevin. Kevin contacts Lacoste and asks for a private meeting.
6	"The Murder Stone - Part 2"	Daniel Grou	Catherine Tregenna	16 December 2022
Gamache and his team dig further into the history and secrets of the Morrow family members while dealing with their own personal demons. Gamache finally solves the puzzle of Charles Morrow's statue (Julia's recently deceased father); giving him the final clue to unlock the mystery of Julia's murder. Kevin and Lacoste have a tense encounter as Kevin tries to tell his side of the story, saying that he was framed for Blue Two-River's murder by the police. Kevin reveals that he heard three gunshots while escaping from a traffic stop where he, Blue and Tommy were pulled over. Gamache and Lacoste secretly investigate his claims. Kevin finally agrees to meet Gamache, but is arrested and later dies in custody.
7	"The Hangman - Part 1"	Sam Donovan	Emilia di Girolamo	23 December 2022
A man is discovered in the woods near Three Pines, seemingly the victim of a group lynching, and Gamache finds himself wondering whether all the villagers are capable of murder.
8	"The Hangman - Part 2"	Sam Donovan	Emilia di Girolamo	23 December 2022
Gamache and his team unearth a tragic story that provides the key to the victim's desire for vengeance, which leads the team to his murderers.

== Production ==
On 21 May 2020, it was announced that Left Bank Pictures had optioned the 18-book novel series by Louise Penny, which is about Chief Inspector Armand Gamache, with Amazon Prime Video in final negotiations to order the project to series. Emilia di Girolamo was attached as head writer, and Sam Donovan was announced as the lead director, directing four episodes. Indigenous Mohawk director Tracey Deer is a series consultant and directed two episodes. On 2 September 2021, it was announced that Alfred Molina was cast in the lead role of Gamache. Rossif Sutherland, Elle-Máijá Tailfeathers, Tantoo Cardinal, Clare Coulter, Sarah Booth, and Anna Tierney were also cast in main roles.

Principal photography was completed between August and December 2021. Filming took place over five five-week periods in Montreal and rural Quebec, specifically in the Eastern Townships, the region of Quebec where the novels take place and original author Penny resides. Specifically, outdoor scenes in the village are filmed in Saint-Armand.

The soundtrack includes music from Elisapie, The Bearhead Sisters, Chloé Stafler, and Riit.

== Release ==
On 1 November 2022, Amazon Studios announced the premiere date and official trailer of Three Pines. With eight one-hour episodes in total, the first two episodes premiered on 2 December 2022, with two new episodes released each week until the finale on 23 December. Initially, the series was set to air only in certain countries: the US, Canada, UK, Ireland, Australia, New Zealand, Sweden, Denmark, Finland, and Greenland.

== Reception ==
On Rotten Tomatoes the show has an approval rating of 72% based on reviews from 18 critics.

Chase Hutchinson of Collider praised Alfred Molina's performance as Inspector Gamache, rating the series a B and wrote, "It is in its more melancholic and macabre moments that Three Pines stumbles upon something more sinister that elevates it a bit beyond a standard mystery tale." Brian Tallerico of RogerEbert.com called it "a collection of intelligent two-hour mysteries that fans of Agatha Christie or even Columbo should watch." Amber Dowling of Variety gave it a positive review and concluded "For now, this short-but-sweet adaptation offers a sweeping cinematic taste of cultures and stories that are deserving of the global platform Prime Video offers, all while doing justice to the best-selling novels on which they're based."

== Awards and nominations ==
The series has been nominated for several awards since its 2022 release.

Year	Organisation	Award	Receiver of Award	Result
2023	Directors Guild of Canada	Outstanding Directorial Achievement in a Dramatic Series	Tracey Deer for the episode: "The Cruellest Month: Part One"	Nominated
2023	Directors Guild of Canada	Outstanding Achievement for Production Design in a Dramatic Series	Martine Kazemurchuck for the episode: "The Hangman: Part Two"	Nominated
2023	ReFrame	Reframe TV Stamp	Whole Cast & Crew	Win
2024	ACTRA Award	Outstanding Performance in TV	Sarah Booth	Nominated

== Cancellation ==
On 13 March 2023, it was announced that the series was canceled after one season. The partners behind the show including Left Bank and Prime wanted the show to return but were unable to reach an agreement.
