= Beware the Woman =

2023 novel by Megan Abbott

- Author: Megan Abbott
- Language: English
- Genre: Psychological thriller Gothic fiction
- Publisher: Putnam
- Publication date: May 30, 2023
- Publication place: United States
- Media type: Print (hardcover), e-book, audiobook
- Pages: 320
- ISBN: 978-0-593-08493-9

Beware the Woman is a 2023 novel by American author Megan Abbott. The story follows Jacy as she visits her new husband's family in the Upper Peninsula of Michigan for the first time. Published by Putnam on May 30, 2023, the novel was inspired by Gothic literature and themes of female bodily autonomy being violated. The novel received positive reviews, including starred reviews from Publishers Weekly and Booklist, and was listed as one of the best novels of 2023 by newspapers such as NPR, PBS NewsHour, The Guardian, The Irish Times, the Tampa Bay Times, the Sun Sentinel, and Literary Hub.

== Plot ==
Jacy and her new husband Jed travel to the Upper Peninsula of Michigan to visit Jed's father, Dr. Ash. Jacy, who is pregnant with her first child, is immediately charmed by his father and unnerved by Dr. Ash's housekeeper, Mrs. Brandt. As she begins to experience complications with her pregnancy, she is examined by one of her father-in-law's friends, a local doctor, and diagnosed with a displaced placenta. Stuck on bedrest, Jacy learns that Jed's mother died in childbirth and that everyone around her appears to be keeping secrets.

== Background and publication ==
The author Megan Abbott was inspired to write the novel by a conversation that she had with a man she was dating who told her that her reproductive history could affect his opinion of her. She wrote the novel in 2021, prior to the Supreme Court's 2022 ruling in Dobbs v. Jackson Women's Health Organization which overturned Roe v. Wade, but it was inspired by concerns that she and other women had about bodily autonomy and gender bias in healthcare. The claustrophobic setting and short timeframe were influenced her need to be grounded, as it was primarily written in lockdown during the COVID-19 pandemic. She researched online to understand pregnancy and was particularly influenced by the way that doctors would speak about their female patients. The title came from male and female anxiety about being controlled by the opposite sex. Abbott was inspired by Gavin de Becker, who was famous for his book The Gift of Fear, which told women to trust their instincts.

The novel was published by Putnam on May 30, 2023, and by Virago in the United Kingdom. The audiobook was narrated by Brittany Pressley and released by Penguin Audio and Books on Tape. Abbott is adapting the novel into a feature film.

== Themes ==
The novel was inspired by Gothic literature, drawing particular comparisons to Daphne du Maurier's Rebecca, Bram Stoker's Dracula and Emily Brontë's Wuthering Heights. Themes of female bodily autonomy being violated by dark forces have often appeared in these Gothic novels. Abbott has often written about female bodies, focusing on teenage athletes in Dare Me and You Will Know Me and medical conditions in The Fever and Give Me Your Hand. The difference in Beware the Woman is that Jacy is not in control of her body, as Jed and his family become increasingly concerned about her pregnancy. Abbott consciously used the Gothic trope of an overbearing mother-in-law, subverting it with the character of Dr. Ash, who hides his darkness behind charm. The novel has also been compared to Rosemary's Baby.

The novel draws inspiration from the cabin in the woods horror film trope, seen in films such as Cabin Fever and The Cabin in the Woods. The novel's setting in Michigan's Upper Peninsula was chosen because Abbott, who grew up in Grosse Pointe, Michigan, perceived it as an exotic place and stated that "You feel like you're in this sort of liminal space between civilization and everything else." Familial relationships are an important theme, with Jed's father and Jacy's mother impacting their relationship and reviewers have described the novel as "a Get Out-style horror story". As Jacy's mother prophetically proclaimed to her on her wedding day, "Honey... we all marry strangers". Abbott described Jacy as her most conventional character, as she is young, married and pregnant. A review in The New York Times characterized her as "almost perversely compliant", as she believes herself to be caught in a romantic drama rather than a horror story.

== Reception ==
Beware the Woman was generally well-received, with starred reviews from Publishers Weekly and Booklist, although some reviewers criticized the pacing, particularly the middle section which is much slower than the middle or end. The audiobook was similarly praised, receiving the Earphones Award from AudioFile. It was listed as one of the best novels of 2023 by NPR, PBS NewsHour, The Guardian, The Irish Times, the Tampa Bay Times, the Sun Sentinel, and Literary Hub.

The novel received a mixed review from the Star Tribune, which commented that it was not Abbott's best novel but fit in well with her previous work. Kirkus Reviews commented that Jed did not feel like a fully-fleshed character but wondered whether this was a deliberate choice, to contrast him against Jacy's full personality. Doug Johnstone praised the character's motivations as being realistic, particularly with the context of the #MeToo movement and the recent atmosphere.

The novel was praised by the Tampa Bay Times for its prose and "many sharply honed twists and whiplash surprises". The pacing received mixed reviews, being praised by Publishers Weekly and The Seattle Times. The Irish Times described it as "a slow-burning novel of almost unbearable tension, with a compelling, poetic narrative voice, an unsettling, delirious atmosphere, an abundance of darkly funny one-liners and a plot that dramatises incisively issues around patriarchy and female bodily autonomy; the violent, shocking, pulpy climax is splendidly lurid". Lawrence De Maria for the Washington Independent Review of Books similarly praised the prose, although he criticized the pacing and described the ending as "implausible". He was frustrated by the character of Jacy and the red herrings and MacGuffins used to disguise how much danger she was in.
