= Dare Me =

Dare Me may refer to:

- Dare Me (novel), by Megan Abbott, 2012
- Dare Me (TV series), an American drama series based on Abbott's novel
- "Dare Me" (song), by The Pointer Sisters, 1985
