= Murder of Annie Le =

2009 murder in New Haven, United States

- Images from missing person flyer released by New Haven police. Right: September 8, 2009, surveillance image taken upon Le's entrance of the research facility where she worked. Left: Undated and uncredited closeup of Le also on flyer.
- Location: 10 Amistad Street; New Haven, Connecticut, U.S.
- Date: September 8, 2009; 17 years ago
- Attack type: Murder by strangulation, attempted sexual assault
- Victim: Annie Marie Le
- Perpetrator: Raymond John Clark III
- Verdict: Pleaded guilty
- Convictions: Murder, attempted sexual assault
- Sentence: 44 years imprisonment

On September 8, 2009, 24-year-old Annie Marie Thu Le was murdered on the New Haven, Connecticut, campus of Yale University. Le was a doctoral student at the Yale School of Medicine's Department of Pharmacology. She was last seen working in a research building on the New Haven campus. On September 13, the day that she was to be married, she was found dead inside the building.

On September 17, police arrested the perpetrator, Raymond J. Clark III, a Yale laboratory technician who worked in the building. Clark pleaded guilty to the murder on March 17, 2011. Clark was sentenced to 44 years imprisonment on June 3.

== Disappearance and death ==
On the morning of September 8, Le left her apartment and took Yale Transit to the Sterling Hall of Medicine on the Yale campus. At about 10 a.m., she walked from Sterling Hall to another campus building at 10 Amistad Street, where her research laboratory was located. Le had left her purse, cell phone, credit cards, and cash in her office at Sterling Hall. She entered the Amistad Street building just after 10 a.m., as documented on footage from the building's security cameras. Le was never seen leaving the building. At approximately 9 p.m. that night, when Le had still not returned home, one of her five housemates called police to report her missing.

Because the security footage did not show Le exiting the building at Amistad Street, police closed the whole building for investigation. Police also searched through refuse at the Hartford dump, where Yale's garbage is incinerated, looking for clues as to Le's whereabouts. The FBI, the New Haven Police Department and the Connecticut State Police were all involved in the search.

On Sunday, September 13, her planned wedding date, authorities discovered Le's body in a cable chase inside the wall of a basement laboratory in the Amistad Street building. Bloody clothes had previously been found above a ceiling tile in the same building, which is monitored by about 75 security cameras. The entrance and the rooms inside the building require Yale identification cards to be opened and accessed. The basement where Le's body was found houses animals that are used for experiments and research. Due to the high security measures in the building, authorities and Yale officials maintained that it would be extremely difficult for someone without a Yale ID card to enter the basement lab, leading them to focus their investigation on Yale employees and students.

The Connecticut medical examiner's autopsy found that Le's death was a result of "traumatic asphyxia due to neck compression". On September 17 police arrested Raymond Clark, a 24-year-old laboratory technician who had been working in the same building. The previous day he was taken into custody after police obtained a warrant to collect his DNA; he was released after providing a sample.

Memorials were held in California and Huntington, New York, and the funeral was broadcast live on the Internet. The Yale community also publicly mourned Le's death. The Yale Daily News reported that professor and Cold War historian John Lewis Gaddis called September 14 the "saddest day to open class" since the day after the 9/11 attacks.

== Personal life ==
Le was born on July 3, 1985, in San Jose, California, to a Vietnamese-American family. She spent her childhood in Placerville, California, with her aunt and uncle. She was valedictorian of her graduating class at Union Mine High School in El Dorado, California, and voted "most likely to be the next Einstein". After earning approximately $160,000 in scholarship money, she attended and graduated from the University of Rochester in New York, where she was mentored by Rocky Tuan. Her major was cell developmental biology with a minor in medical anthropology.

In September 2007, Le was accepted into a graduate program at Yale that would have led to her earning a doctorate in pharmacology. Her research had applications in the treatment of diabetes and certain forms of cancer. Since July 2008, Le was engaged to Jonathan Widawsky, a graduate student in applied physics and mathematics at Columbia University and was due to be married on September 13, 2009, in Syosset, New York.

She had previously written an article for Yale Medical School's B Magazine titled "Crime and Safety in New Haven", published in February 2009.

== Media coverage ==
The case of Annie Le generated frenetic media coverage, with a news producer trampled in a rush to a briefing. Some commentators suggested that the attention given by the media was inappropriately disproportionate to that given to other murder victims. Slate contributor Jack Shafer opined that "Journalists almost everywhere observe this rough rule of thumb: Three murders at a Midwestern college equal one murder at Harvard or Yale." Connecticut Post columnist MariAn Gail Brown argued that there is a "pecking order in many things", including the investigation of crimes, and that Le's murder attracted media attention because she was an Ivy Leaguer and "[s]omeone who might earn beaucoup bucks, [s]omeone who possesses sky's-the-limit potential, [v]ivacious and attractive, too."

== Prosecution ==
After his arrest, Clark was held on $3 million bail at the MacDougall-Walker Correctional Institution, a maximum-security prison in Suffield, Connecticut. He appeared in Connecticut Superior Court on October 6, 2009, but did not then enter a plea to the charges. His hearing was delayed until January 26, 2010, since not all of the materials in the case had been made available to the lawyers. Clark initially pleaded not guilty on January 26. His pretrial hearing was scheduled for March 3, 2010, in New Haven with pretrial evidence processing scheduled for July 26.

In October 2010, Clark's case was continued and another hearing was scheduled for February 9, 2011. In March 2011, Clark entered a guilty plea in Le's murder in exchange for a 44-year prison term. On an additional charge of an attempted sexual assault of Le, he entered an Alford plea, a guilty plea that does not admit the facts but concedes the sufficiency of the evidence against him. Clark officially entered the pleas on March 17 and he was formally sentenced to 44 years' imprisonment on June 3. At his sentencing, Clark took responsibility for his actions and expressed remorse for the murder.

Clark is serving his sentence at the Cheshire Correctional Institution, and is scheduled for release on September 16, 2053. Under a 2023 law expanding parole eligibility for youthful offenders, however, he will become eligible for parole after serving 60% sentence, or 26.4 years.

== See also ==
- List of solved missing person cases (post-2000)
- Bonnie Garland murder case, Yale undergraduate murdered by her boyfriend, a Yale alumnus, during summer break 1977
- Murder of Christian Prince, involving the death of a Yale senior on campus in 1991
- Murder of Suzanne Jovin, involving the death of a Yale senior off campus in 1998
- Murder of Kevin Jiang, involving the death of a Yale graduate student off campus in 2021
- Give Me Your Hand, a novel by Megan Abbott partly inspired by the murder of Annie Le
