= Marie Robards =

American murderer (born 1976)

- Born: Dorothy Marie Robards; July 10, 1976 (age 50)
- Parents: Steven Robards (father); Beth Burroughs (mother)
- Conviction: Murder
- Penalty: 27 years (paroled after 8)

Details
- Victims: 1
- Date: February 17, 1993

Dorothy Marie Robards Strauch (born July 10, 1976) is an American woman, known for the poisoning murder of her father, Steven Robards, in 1993, when she was aged 16, in Fort Worth, Texas.

== Crime ==
Marie stole barium acetate from her high school chemistry class and laced her father's tacos with a lethal dose. The trial received media attention since she was a promising student, and patricide is a rare crime more commonly committed by men.

== Discovery and conviction ==
Steven Robards's death was ruled a heart attack initially. Over a year after his death, Marie confessed to a close friend, Stacey High. Her friend then disclosed her information to law enforcement. The medical examiner's office used a gas chromatography–mass spectrometry machine to examine his tissue samples and detected the highly soluble metallic compound. She confessed, telling police she wished to live with her mother. She pleaded not guilty, explaining her intent was to make her father ill. However, this argument did not hold up in court, as prosecutors pointed out that she would not have used such a massive dose of poison if she was merely trying to make her father ill. Prosecutors also argued that the intent was clearly murder as she would only be able to live with her mother upon her father's death.

Marie Robards was convicted of murder in a 1995 trial and sentenced to 27 years in prison. She was released on parole in 2003. She is believed to now be living under a new identity.

== In popular culture ==
The crime was an inspiration for Megan Abbott's 2018 novel Give Me Your Hand, and was covered in episodes of Forensic Files (Season 6, episode 5 (2001)), Redrum (Season 2, episode 17 (2014)), and Deadly Women (Season 6, episode 2 (2012)). It was also the subject of Morbid: A True Crime Podcast, episode 552 in March 2024. Additionally there is Hombres Asesinos Season 5 Episode 3 "Emmanuel".
