= Electrovite =

Electrovite is manufactured by Dominion Veterinary Laboratories (DVL) Inc., based in Winnipeg, Manitoba. The company is Western Canada's largest manufacturer and distributor of veterinary pharmaceuticals, and describes itself as a family business. DVL has export ties to Trinidad, the Middle East and South Korea and was a 1999 Canada Export Award recipient.

Electrovite is a powder designed to alleviate physiological stress in cattle. It contains 8 vitamins: A, D3, E, B6, B12, folic acid (B9), ascorbic acid (vitamin C), along with a vitamin K derivative, menadione sodium bisulfite DVL adds these vitamins to an electrolyte premix that has 7 mineral salts: magnesium acetate, sodium acetate, calcium acetate, potassium chloride, calcium chloride, sodium chloride and sodium diacetate. DVL packages the product in 300 gram packs, sold for $5.31.

Besides labor costs, the only cost consideration in the manufacture of the vitamins and salts is the prices of the raw chemicals. These raw materials include lemongrass oil, m-Cresol and ethyl acetylacetate.

== Electrolyte Balance in Cattle ==
Electrolytes for cattle are part of a nutritional component known as the dietary electrolyte balance. Most causes of stress manifest as an imbalance of some kind in cattle's fluid stability. Electrolyte supplementation, as done with Electrovite, assists in maintaining electrolyte balance, and reduces the need for energy expenditure on the part of the animal to restore/self-regulate this balance. Besides the potential of electrolyte and vitamin solutions to alleviate stress, these additives may directly boost production. Even under stress conditions, supplementing diets with salts can stimulate feed intake. Hence, Electrovite would alleviate physiological stress and provide a boost to milk production.
