= Die a Little =

2005 novel by Megan Abbott

- Author: Megan Abbott
- Language: English
- Publication date: 2005
- Publication place: United States

Die a Little is a 2005 novel by American author Megan Abbott.

== Plot ==
Lora King is a schoolteacher who has always lived with her brother Bill, an investigator with the district attorney's office. When Bill meets and marries Alice Steele, a wardrobe designer in Hollywood, Lora begins to investigate the truth about Alice's past.

== Background and publication ==
The author Megan Abbott was an avid fan of film noir as a child, as she had grown up watching films such as The Public Enemy, Sunset Boulevard and Dinner at Eight. She completed a PhD in literature at New York University and her thesis – later published as The Street Was Mine – focused on hard-boiled noir. Her graduate studies inspired Abbott to begin to write the novel that would become Die a Little, as reading Raymond Chandler, Chester Himes, and James M. Cain encouraged her to enter "the world of these books from a different angle — not from an analytical perspective, but an imaginative one". Abbott was inspired to write the novel by a black and white magazine photograph of a woman talking to her date at a restaurant.

Die a Little was published on February 1, 2005, by Simon & Schuster. It was published in the United Kingdom on August 4, 2008. The novel was optioned for film by the actress Jessica Biel in 2007.

== Themes ==
Despite being set within the conventions of the noir genre, the novel avoids simply typecasting Alice as a cruel seductress and Lora as an out-of-touch civilian. It was described as a woman's noir, "in which the lowest of the low are the women who sacrifice other women to men, and the hard-boiled heroes are the tough broads who shelter the men they love." In Die a Little, Abbott intended there to be a pseudo-romantic relationship between siblings Lora and Bill – this overly close familial bond would appear again in her work in the 2011 novel The End of Everything.

== Reception ==
Die a Little received generally positive reviews, including a starred review from Kirkus Reviews, although some critics critiqued it for falling short of similar novels by big names in the genre. A review in Booklist praised the tone, describing it as "a tale that smolders like the night’s last, forgotten cigarette", but argued that it was not as ambitious or skillful as James Ellroy's L.A. Confidential. The novel received a B rating from Jennifer Reese of Entertainment Weekly, who commented that "this arty noir exercise has some wonderfully depraved twists, but Abbott never achieves the momentum and black poetry of the genre's masters, like the peerless James M. Cain".

A review in The Village Voice praised Abbott for capturing the style and prose of the genre while turning her focus on women, a rare subject even amongst female pulp fiction writers. The voice to tell the story from a woman's perspective was similarly praised by The Guardian, and Laura Wilson mentioned specifically the accurate period setting and dialogue.
