= Give Me Your Hand (disambiguation) =

"Give Me Your Hand" is an early 17th-century Irish tune by Rory Dall O'Cahan.

Give Me Your Hand may also refer to:

- Give Me Your Hand (film), a 2008 French film directed by Pascal-Alex Vincent
- "Give Me Your Hand" (Best Song Ever), a 2012 single by The Ready Set
- Give Me Your Hand (novel), a 2018 American novel written by Megan Abbott
- "Gimme A Hand", a 2019 episode of the animated series Ollie & Scoops

== See also ==
- "Saathi Haath Badhana" (lit. 'Friend Give Me Your Hand'), a song by O. P. Nayyar, Mohammed Rafi and Asha Bhosle from the 1957 Indian film Naya Daur
