= Strontium acetate =

Names
- IUPAC name Strontium acetate
- Other names: Strontium(II) acetate

Identifiers
CAS Number	543-94-2
3D model (JSmol)	Interactive image
ChemSpider	10522
ECHA InfoCard	100.008.050
EC Number	208-854-8
PubChem CID	10987
RTECS number	AJ4725000
UNII	4SL32YMY7B
CompTox Dashboard (EPA)	DTXSID40890503
- InChI: InChI=1S/2C2H4O2.Sr/c2*1-2(3)4;/h2*1H3,(H,3,4);/q;;+2/p-2 Key: RXSHXLOMRZJCLB-UHFFFAOYSA-L
- SMILES: CC(=O)[O-].CC(=O)[O-].[Sr+2]

Properties
Chemical formula	Sr(C_{2}H_{4}O_{2})_{2}
Molar mass	205.932 g/mol
Appearance	White crystals
Density	2.099 g/cm^{3}
Melting point	150 °C (302 °F; 423 K)
Solubility in water	Soluble
log P	−1.122

Hazards
NFPA 704 (fire diamond)	1 0 1
Flash point	Not flammable

Related compounds
Other cations	Magnesium acetate; Calcium acetate; Barium acetate
- Except where otherwise noted, data are given for materials in their standard state (at 25 °C [77 °F], 100 kPa). Infobox references

Strontium acetate is a compound with formula (CH_{3}COO)_{2}Sr. It is a strontium salt of acetic acid. It is a white crystalline solid and is soluble in water like other acetates. It is used as a pathway for other chemicals such as barium acetate. Additionally, it is used in some strontium-containing toothpastes.

SrOAc

== Preparation ==
Strontium acetate is formed by reacting strontium metal, strontium oxide, strontium hydroxide or strontium carbonate with acetic acid.

Sr + 2 CH_{3}COOH → (CH_{3}COO)_{2}Sr + H_{2}
SrO + 2 CH_{3}COOH → (CH_{3}COO)_{2}Sr + H_{2}O
Sr(OH)_{2} + 2 CH_{3}COOH → (CH_{3}COO)_{2}Sr + 2 H_{2}O
SrCO_{3} + 2 CH_{3}COOH → (CH_{3}COO)_{2}Sr + H_{2}O + CO_{2}
