= Magnesium acetate =

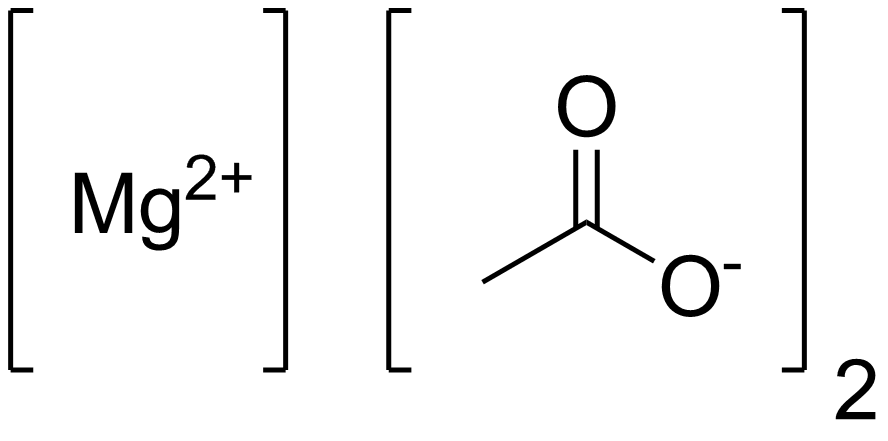

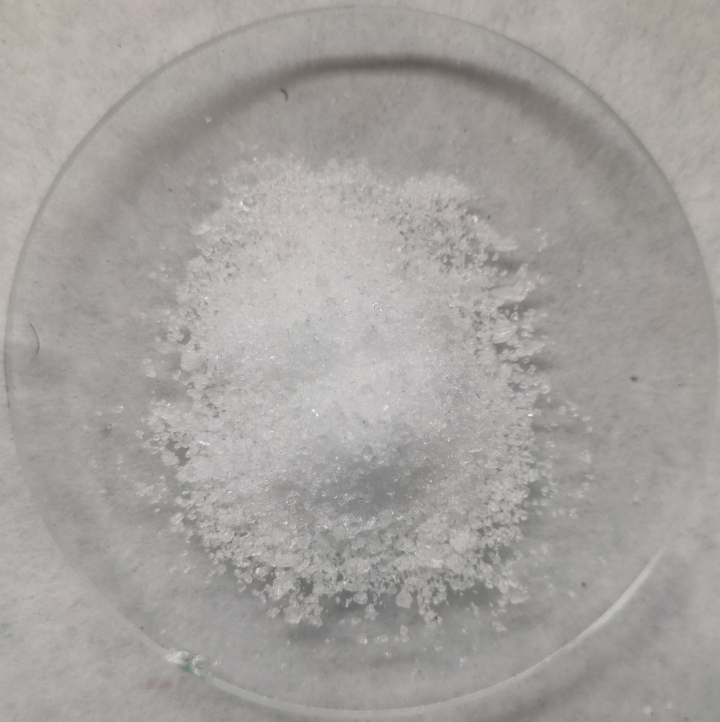

Names
- IUPAC name Magnesium acetate

Identifiers
CAS Number	142-72-3 (Anhydrous); 16674-78-5 (Tetrahydrate)
3D model (JSmol)	Interactive image; Interactive image
ChEBI	CHEBI:62964
ChEMBL	ChEMBL1200691
ChemSpider	8556
ECHA InfoCard	100.005.050
PubChem CID	8896
UNII	0E95JZY48K
CompTox Dashboard (EPA)	DTXSID7027097
- InChI: InChI=1S/2C2H4O2.Mg/c2*1-2(3)4;/h2*1H3,(H,3,4);/q;;+2/p-2 Key: UEGPKNKPLBYCNK-UHFFFAOYSA-L; InChI=1/2C2H4O2.Mg/c2*1-2(3)4;/h2*1H3,(H,3,4);/q;;+2/p-2 Key: UEGPKNKPLBYCNK-NUQVWONBAP
- SMILES: CC(=O)O[Mg]OC(=O)C; [Mg+2].[O-]C(=O)C.[O-]C(=O)C

Properties
Chemical formula	Mg(CH_{3}COO)_{2}
Molar mass	142.394 g/mol (anhydrous); 214.455 g/mol (tetrahydrate)
Appearance	White hygroscopic crystals
Density	1.45 g/cm^{3} (tetrahydrate)
Melting point	80 °C (176 °F; 353 K) (tetrahydrate)
Solubility in water	Soluble
Magnetic susceptibility (χ)	−116.0·10^{−6} cm^{3}/mol (+4 H_{2}O

Related compounds
Other cations	Basic beryllium acetate; Calcium acetate; Strontium acetate; Barium acetate
- Except where otherwise noted, data are given for materials in their standard state (at 25 °C [77 °F], 100 kPa). verify (what is ?) Infobox references

Anhydrous magnesium acetate has the chemical formula Mg(CH_{3}COO)_{2} and in its hydrated form, magnesium acetate tetrahydrate, it has the chemical formula Mg(CH_{3}COO)_{2}·4H_{2}O. In this compound magnesium has an oxidation state of +2. Magnesium acetate is the magnesium salt of acetic acid. It is deliquescent and upon heating, it decomposes to form magnesium oxide. Magnesium acetate is commonly used as a source of magnesium in biological reactions.

== Physical properties ==
Magnesium acetate appears as white hygroscopic crystals. It smells like acetic acid and is soluble in water. When it is in an aqueous solution its pH will be on the alkaline side of neutral.

== Storage ==
Due to the fact that it is very hygroscopic, it must be stored away from water. It is also incompatible with strong oxidizers and should not be mixed with them.

== Synthesis ==
Synthesis of magnesium acetate from the reaction of magnesium hydroxide with acetic acid.

2 CH_{3}COOH + Mg(OH)_{2} → Mg(CH_{3}COO)_{2} + 2 H_{2}O

Magnesium carbonate suspended in distilled water with 20% acetic acid solution.

2 CH_{3}COOH + MgCO_{3} → Mg(CH_{3}COO)_{2} + CO_{2} + H_{2}O

Reacting metallic magnesium with acetic acid dissolved in dry benzene causes magnesium acetate to form along with the release of hydrogen gas.

Mg + 2 CH_{3}COOH → Mg(CH_{3}COO)_{2} + H_{2}

== Uses and applications ==
In 1881 Charles Clamond invented the Clamond basket, one of the first effective gas mantles. The reagents used in this invention included magnesium acetate, magnesium hydroxide, and water.

Magnesium acetate is commonly used as a source of magnesium or for the acetate ion in chemistry experiments. One example of this is when magnesium acetate and magnesium nitrate were both used to perform molecular dynamics simulations and surface tension measurements. In the experiment the authors found that the acetate had a stronger affinity for the surface compared to the nitrate ion and that the Mg^{2+} strongly repelled away from the air/liquid interference. They also found that the Mg^{2+} had a stronger tendency to bind with the acetate ion compared to the nitrate.

One of the more prevalent uses of magnesium acetate is in the mixture called calcium magnesium acetate (CMA). It is a mixture of calcium acetate and magnesium acetate. CMA is thought of as an environmentally friendly alternative deicer to NaCl and CaCl_{2}. CMA also acts as a powerful SO_{2}, NO_{x}, and toxic particulate emission control agent in coal combustion processes to reduce acid rain, and as an effective catalyst for the facilitation of coal combustion.

Magnesium acetate has been found to cause a conformational change in Escherichia coli enzyme Primase. In this experiment Mg(OAc)_{2}, MnCl_{2}, CaCl_{2}, NaOAc, LiCl, MgSO_{4} and MgCl_{2} were all compared to see what effect they had on the Escherichia coli enzyme Primase. The experimenters found that Mg(OAc)_{2} caused the best conformational change. MgSO_{4} and MgCl_{2} induced the effect slightly while the rest did not.

When magnesium acetate is mixed with hydrogen peroxide, it acts as a bactericidal.

Magnesium acetate has been shown to be effective at ashing organic compounds in preparation for a fluorine analysis when high or low concentrations of fluorine are present.

== Safety ==
Magnesium acetate is a relatively safe compound to handle and has been given a health hazard rating of zero. However, it should always be handled with gloves and safety goggles. If it gets in the eyes, the skin, ingested, or inhaled it will cause irritation in the respective areas: eyes, skin, gastrointestinal system, and lungs.
