= Calcium acetate =

Chemical compound

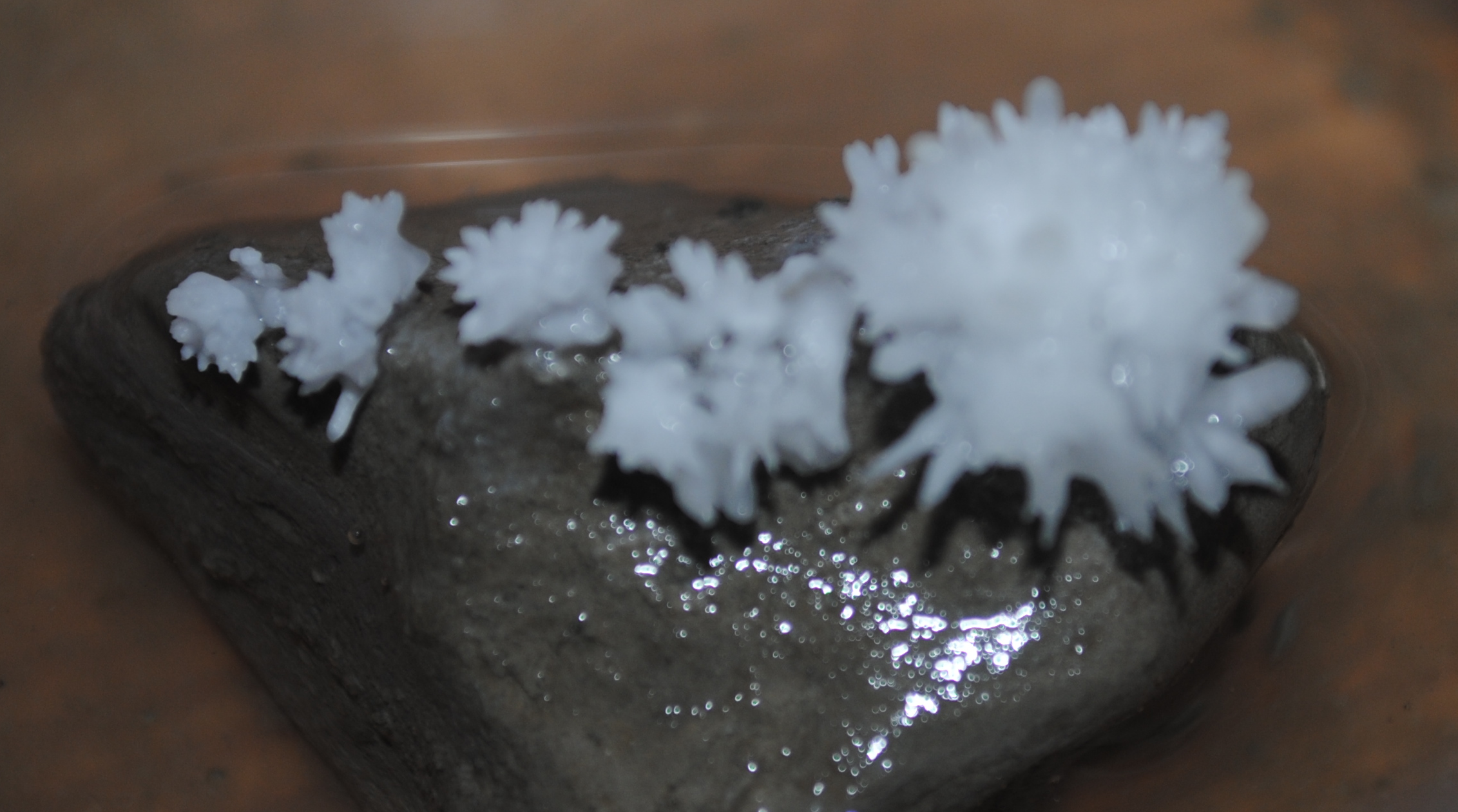
- Calcium acetate crystals

Names
- Preferred IUPAC name Calcium diacetate
- Other names Acetate of lime Calcium ethanoate

Identifiers
CAS Number	62-54-4; 5743-26-0 (monohydrate)
3D model (JSmol)	Interactive image; Interactive image
Abbreviations	Ca(OAc)_{2}
Beilstein Reference	3692527
ChEBI	CHEBI:3310
ChEMBL	ChEMBL1200800
ChemSpider	5890
DrugBank	DB00258
ECHA InfoCard	100.000.492
EC Number	269-613-0
E number	E263 (preservatives)
Gmelin Reference	22320
KEGG	D00931
PubChem CID	6116
RTECS number	AF7525000
UNII	Y882YXF34X; 7ZA48GIM5H (monohydrate)
CompTox Dashboard (EPA)	DTXSID0020234
- InChI: InChI=1S/2C2H4O2.Ca/c2*1-2(3)4;/h2*1H3,(H,3,4);/q;;+2/p-2 Key: VSGNNIFQASZAOI-UHFFFAOYSA-L; InChI=1/2C2H4O2.Ca/c2*1-2(3)4;/h2*1H3,(H,3,4);/q;;+2/p-2 Key: VSGNNIFQASZAOI-NUQVWONBAW
- SMILES: CC(=O)O[Ca]OC(=O)C; [Ca+2].[O-]C(=O)C.[O-]C(=O)C

Properties
Chemical formula	Ca(CH_{3}COO)_{2}
Molar mass	158.166 g/mol (anhydrous); 176.181 g/mol (monohydrate)
Appearance	White solid hygroscopic
Odor	slight acetic acid odor
Density	1.509 g/cm^{3}
Melting point	160 °C (320 °F; 433 K) decomposition to CaCO_{3} + acetone
Solubility in water	37.4 g/100 mL (0 °C); 34.7 g/100 mL (20 °C); 29.7 g/100 mL (100 °C)
Solubility	slightly soluble in methanol, hydrazine insoluble in acetone, ethanol and benzene
Acidity (pK_{a})	ca. 0.7
Magnetic susceptibility (χ)	−70.7·10^{−6} cm^{3}/mol
Refractive index (n_{D})	1.55

Pharmacology
ATC code	V03AE07 (WHO)

Hazards
NFPA 704 (fire diamond)	1 1 0
Autoignition temperature	680 to 730 °C (1,256 to 1,346 °F; 953 to 1,003 K)
- Lethal dose or concentration (LD, LC)
LD_{50} (median dose)	4280 mg/kg (oral, rat)

Related compounds
Other cations	Magnesium acetate; Strontium acetate; Barium acetate
- Except where otherwise noted, data are given for materials in their standard state (at 25 °C [77 °F], 100 kPa). verify (what is ?) Infobox references

Calcium acetate is a chemical compound which is a calcium salt of acetic acid. It has the formula Ca(CH_{3}COO)_{2}. Its standard name is calcium acetate, while calcium ethanoate is the systematic name. An older name is acetate of lime. The anhydrous form is very hygroscopic; therefore the monohydrate (Ca(CH_{3}COO)_{2}·H_{2}O) is the common form.

== Production ==
Calcium acetate can be prepared by soaking calcium carbonate (found in eggshells, or in common carbonate rocks such as limestone or marble) or hydrated lime in vinegar:

CaCO_{3}(s) + 2 CH_{3}COOH(aq) → Ca(CH_{3}COO)_{2}(aq) + H_{2}O(l) + CO_{2}(g)
Ca(OH)_{2}(s) + 2 CH_{3}COOH(aq) → Ca(CH_{3}COO)_{2}(aq) + 2 H_{2}O(l)

Since both reagents would have been available pre-historically, the chemical would have been observable as crystals then.

== Uses ==
- In kidney disease, blood levels of phosphate may rise (called hyperphosphatemia) leading to bone problems. Calcium acetate binds phosphate in the diet to lower blood phosphate levels.
- Calcium acetate is used as a food additive, as a stabilizer, buffer and sequestrant, mainly in candy products under the number E263.
- Tofu is traditionally obtained by coagulating soy milk with calcium sulfate. Calcium acetate has been found to be a better alternative; being soluble, it requires less skill and a smaller amount.
- Because it is inexpensive, calcium acetate was once a common starting material for the synthesis of acetone before the development of the cumene process:

Ca(CH_{3}COO)_{2} → CaCO_{3}(s) + (CH_{3})_{2}CO

- A saturated solution of calcium acetate in alcohol forms a semisolid, flammable gel that is much like "canned heat" products such as Sterno. Chemistry teachers often prepare "California Snowballs", a mixture of calcium acetate solution and ethanol. The resulting gel is whitish in color, resembling a snowball and can be lit on fire; it will burn for around 20 minutes.

== Natural occurrence ==
Pure calcium acetate is yet unknown among minerals. Calclacite—calcium acetate chloride pentahydrate—is listed as a known mineral, but its genesis is anthropogenic (human-generated, as opposed to naturally occurring).
