= Herizen F. Guardiola =

American actress and singer

- Born: Herizen Fawn Guardiola; July 24, 1996 (age 30); Miami, Florida, U.S.
- Parents: Johnny Dread (father); Venice Pink (mother)
- Musical career
- Genres: Disco; Gospel
- Occupations: Singer; songwriter; actress
- Instrument: Vocals
- Years active: 2015–present
- Label

Herizen F. Guardiola (born July 24, 1996) is an American singer, songwriter, and actress. She is known for her breakout role as Mylene Cruz on the Netflix original series, The Get Down. Inspired by her reggae musician father, Johnny Dread, Herizen has also been featured on numerous musical projects, including Absofacto's "ThousandPeaces" EP, the soundtrack for The Get Down, and the official soundtrack for the Major Lazer documentary "Give Me Future." By October 2018, she released her first EP, Come Over To My House. Three months later, she was featured on What So Not's single, "We Can Be Friends." Most recently in April 2019, she released her latest single, "Focus."

== Early life ==
Guardiola is a native of Miami, Florida. Her father, Juan Carlos Guardiola, stage named (Johnny Dread), is a reggae musician of Cuban descent, and her mother, Venice Pink, of Jamaican descent, is a nutritionist and yoga instructor. Guardiola has two younger sisters.

== Career ==
Guardiola made her acting debut in The Get Down, a Netflix original series from Baz Luhrmann. About her discovery, Luhrmann said, "It's always thrilling to find a fresh unknown talent, particularly one who is not only a terrific actor but a magnificent vocalist." She also appeared in the show Dare Me, in which she played Addy Hanlon, one of the main roles of the show. In 2021, she played singer Tara Riley on season 23, episode 3 of Law & Order: Special Victims Unit.

== Soundtrack appearances ==
Year	Album	Track(s)
2016	The Get Down	"Be That As It May" "Grace of God" "I'll Be There" "Set Me Free" "Up the Ladder" "I'll Keep a Light in My Window" "Toy Box" "I'm My #1" "The Other Side"

== Filmography ==
Year	Title	Role	Note
2015	Runaway Island	Freya Nordholm	Film
2016–2017	The Get Down	Mylene Cruz	Main role
2019–2020	Dare Me	Addy Hanlon	Main role
2020	Lost Husband	Sunshine	
2021	American Gods	Oshun	TV series
2021	Law & Order: Special Victims Unit	Tara Riley	TV series

== See also ==
- List of Afro-Latinos
