= Dare Me (TV series) =

American teen drama television series

- Genre: Teen drama; Thriller; Mystery
- Based on: Dare Me by Megan Abbott
- Developed by: Megan Abbott & Gina Fattore
- Starring: Willa Fitzgerald; Herizen Guardiola; Marlo Kelly; Rob Heaps; Zach Roerig; Paul Fitzgerald; Alison Thornton
- Narrated by: Herizen Guardiola
- Composer: Jonathan Sanford
- Country of origin: United States
- Original language: English
- No. of seasons: 1
- No. of episodes: 10

Production
- Executive producers: Steph Green (pilot); Karen Rosenfelt; Sarah Condon; Peter Berg; Michael Lombardo; Megan Abbott; Gina Fattore
- Producers: Dan Kaplow; Ariel Schrag; Jamie Rosengard
- Running time: 42–52 minutes
- Production companies: Megan Abbott; Drowning Girl Productions; Fair Harbor Productions; Film 44; Universal Content Productions

Original release
- Network: USA Network
- Release: December 29, 2019 – March 8, 2020

Dare Me is an American teen drama mystery thriller television series based on the 2012 novel of the same name by Megan Abbott, co-developed with Gina Fattore. The series was picked up in late January 2019 and premiered on USA Network on December 29, 2019. In April 2020, USA Network canceled the series after one season.

== Premise ==
Dare Me follows the lives of competitive high school cheerleaders in a small Midwestern town. The cheerleaders become entangled in a series of dark secrets after their new coach Colette French takes over the squad.

== Cast and characters ==
=== Main ===
- Willa Fitzgerald as Coach Colette French, Sutton Grove High School's new cheerleading coach
- Herizen Guardiola as Addy Hanlon, a cheerleader at Sutton Grove High School
- Marlo Kelly as Beth Cassidy, Addy's best friend and the captain of the cheer squad until Coach French eliminates the position
- Rob Heaps as Matt French, Colette's husband and a project manager at Eagle Investments who is working on Sutton Grove High School's new stadium
- Zach Roerig as Sergeant Will Mosley, a local recruiter for the U.S. Marine Corps who is having an affair with Colette
- Paul Fitzgerald as Bert Cassidy, Beth's estranged father and the president of a real estate company named Eagle Investments
- Alison Thornton as Tacy Cassidy, Beth's half-sister, and a freshman cheerleader on Sutton Grove High School's squad

=== Recurring ===
- Antonio J. Bell as Michael Slocum, Addy's friend
- Amanda Brugel as Faith Hanlon, Addy's single mother who is a police officer
- Tammy Blanchard as Lana Cassidy, Beth's mother
- Tamberla Perry as J.J. Curtis, one of the local cheerleader boosters, and RiRi's mother
- Adrian Walters as Jimmy Tibbs a subordinate Marine recruiter of Will
- Chris Zylka as Corporal Kurtz, a subordinate Marine recruiter of Will
- Taveeta Szymanowicz as RiRi Curtis, a fellow member of the cheerleading team, and Addy and Beth's friend, and J.J.'s daughter
- Brittany Raymond as Cori Ross, a fellow member of the cheerleading team
- Erika Prevost as Brianna Bradley, a fellow member of the cheerleading team

== Episodes ==
No.	Title	Directed by	Written by	Original release date	U.S viewers (millions)
1	"Coup d'État"	Steph Green	Megan Abbott & Gina Fattore	December 29, 2019 (Note: The episode was first released online on December 19, 2019.)	0.600
2	"Mutually Assured Destruction"	Jamie Travis	Megan Abbott & Gina Fattore	January 5, 2020	0.349
3	"Surrender at Discretion"	Lauren Wolkstein	Ariel Schrag	January 12, 2020	0.395
4	"Rapprochement"	Marisol Adler	Jamie Rosengard	January 19, 2020	0.397
5	"Parallel Trenches"	Olivia Newman	Lisa Lutz	January 26, 2020	0.376
6	"Code Red"	Josephine Decker	Danielle Henderson	February 9, 2020	0.390
7	"Scorched Earth"	Bronwen Hughes	Joe Johnson	February 16, 2020	0.394
8	"Containment"	Justin Tipping	Cathryn Humphris	February 23, 2020	0.315
9	"Fog of War"	Megan Griffiths	Lisa Lutz	March 1, 2020	0.374
10	"Shock & Awe"	Jamie Travis	Megan Abbott & Gina Fattore	March 8, 2020	0.432

== Production ==
=== Development ===
On January 28, 2019, the production had been given a series order. The writer of the novel, Megan Abbott, is expected to executive produce alongside Gina Fattore, Peter Berg, Michael Lombardo, Sarah Condon, and Karen Rosenfelt. Production companies involved with the series were slated to include Universal Cable Productions and Film 44. On November 8, 2019, it was announced that the series would premiere on December 29, 2019. On April 30, 2020, the series was canceled after one season. However, Megan Abbott and Gina Fatore plan to shop the series to other networks.

=== Casting ===
On July 25, 2018, Willa Fitzgerald, Herizen Guardiola, and Marlo Kelly were cast in starring roles in the pilot. On August 14, 2018, Rob Heaps, Zach Roerig, and Paul Fitzgerald joined the main cast, while Joyful Drake, Tammy Blanchard, Antonio J. Bell, Alison Thornton, and Tamberla Perry were set to recur. On May 29, 2019, Chris Zylka and Taveeta Syzmanowicz were cast in recurring roles. On August 7, 2019, Adrian Walters and Amanda Brugel joined the cast in recurring capacities. Alison Thornton was promoted to series regular in the second episode of the first season.

=== Filming ===
Principal photography for the first season began on April 22, 2019 and concluded on August 6, 2019 in Toronto, Ontario, Canada.

== Reception ==
=== Critical response ===
Dare Me received generally favorable reviews. On Rotten Tomatoes, the series holds an approval rating of 85% with an average rating of 7.3/10, based on 27 reviews from critics. The website's critical consensus reads, "Visceral, if at times vapid, Dare Me's slow-burning thriller pairs nicely with its moody atmospherics to create a deft exploration of the interiority of teen life." On Metacritic, it has a weighted average score of 73 out of 100, based on 12 critics, indicating "generally favorable reviews".

=== Ratings ===
Viewership and ratings per episode of Dare Me
No.	Title	Air date	Rating (18–49)	Viewers (millions)	DVR (18–49)	DVR viewers (millions)	Total (18–49)	Total viewers (millions)
1	"Coup d'État"	December 29, 2019	0.2	0.600	0.1	0.257	0.3	0.857
2	"Mutually Assured Destruction"	January 5, 2020	0.1	0.349	0.1	0.206	0.2	0.555
3	"Surrender at Discretion"	January 12, 2020	0.1	0.395	0.1	0.274	0.2	0.669
4	"Rapprochement"	January 19, 2020	0.1	0.397	0.1	0.262	0.2	0.659
5	"Parallel Trenches"	January 26, 2020	0.1	0.376	0.1	0.254	0.2	0.630
6	"Code Red"	February 9, 2020	0.1	0.390	0.1	0.218	0.2	0.608
7	"Scorched Earth"	February 16, 2020	0.1	0.394	0.1	0.218	0.2	0.612
8	"Containment"	February 23, 2020	0.1	0.315	0.1	0.283	0.2	0.598
9	"Fog of War"	March 1, 2020	0.1	0.374	0.1	0.265	0.2	0.639
10	"Shock & Awe"	March 8, 2020	0.1	0.432	TBD	TBD	TBD	TBD
