= James Randall (murderer) =

American murderer

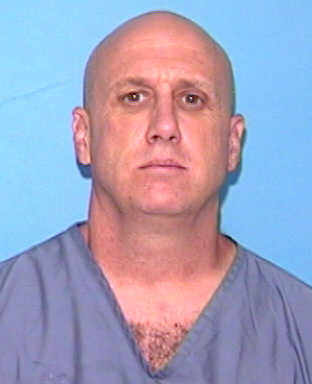
- Police photograph of Randall
- Born: James Michael Randall; August 28, 1954 (age 72); United States
- Spouse: Linda Randall (June 9, 1979; 1998?)
- Convictions: Massachusetts; Sexual battery (2 counts); Kidnapping; Florida; Second degree murder (2 counts) (reduced from first degree murder on appeal)
- Penalty: Massachusetts; 5 to 7 years Florida; Death; commuted to life imprisonment

Details
- Victims: 2 convicted, 4+ suspected
- Span of crimes: 1995–1996
- Country: United States
- States: Florida, Massachusetts
- Date apprehended: July 1, 1996

James Michael Randall (born August 28, 1954) is an American criminal whose convictions included multiple rapes, a kidnapping, and the murder of two women in the Tampa Bay Area in Florida in the 1990s. Randall is an inmate in the Jefferson Correctional Institute serving out two life sentences.

== 1980s prosecutions ==
Randall was a chief suspect in the 1984 death of Boston resident Holly Jean Cote, whose death by strangulation was never solved. Cote was a friend of Randall's then-wife, Linda Randall. Cote was last seen alive in the area of Gardner, Massachusetts on March 4, 1984. Her body was found in early May in a marsh near Birch Hill Dam in Royalston, Massachusetts. His suspected involvement in Cote's death is based on statements Randall made to his then-wife and to mental health workers during interactions he had with psychiatric services in late 1984, and on the fact that Cote's body was recovered in a fishing area Randall was known to frequent. Randall was never charged with an offense relating to Cote's death but evidence relating to the investigation was raised in the subsequent Evans/Pugh murder trial.

In the late 1980s a Massachusetts court convicted James Randall of an incident of sexual battery of Linda Randall, which occurred on July 18, 1986. Later the same year James was convicted of two counts of sexual battery and one count of kidnapping, also relating to Linda Randall. He was sentenced to five to seven years imprisonment for these offenses and spent time in a Massachusetts prison until his release in 1992. After his release Randall moved to Florida and got a job as a window installer.

== Murders of Wendy Evans and Cynthia Pugh ==
On October 20, 1995, Wendy Evans, a suspected Florida sex worker, was killed by strangulation; her naked body was found on Myrtle Lane in Oldsmar by a pizza delivery driver later the same day. On January 18, 1996, Cynthia Pugh, another Florida prostitute, was also killed by strangulation, her body being discovered on January 19, 1996.

Police identified James Randall as a person of interest in relation to both deaths after finding tire marks that matched Randall's Dodge D-50 pick-up truck. Police went to speak to Randall on June 27, 1996, at his residence. Following that conversation police observed Randall leaving his premises in his truck and attempted to stop him to ask further questions, but Randall instead accelerated away from police and a high-speed chase between Randall and police followed. Following the conclusion of the chase Randall continued to flee on foot and escaped, although he was eventually found and detained four days later (July 1, 1996).

Police investigations revealed that Randall had a history of engaging in consensual erotic asphyxiation with his sexual partners, along with allegations of non-consensual violent attacks on his then-girlfriend Terry-Jo Howard involving in part attempts to choke her.

In April 1997 Randall was convicted by a Florida jury of first-degree murder in the strangulation deaths of both women. Sentencing judge Susan Schaeffer found three aggravating factors in the offence, being (1) that Randall had a previous conviction for a felony, (2) that the previous conviction was for a violent felony, and (3) that the murders were especially heinous, callous or cruel. Taking these factors into account, the court sentenced Randall to two death sentences in relation to the murders. He was also sentenced to a concurrent sentence of five years on a charge of evading police.

Randall appealed the murder convictions; his appeal was heard by the Supreme Court of Florida in 2000. The court upheld the appeals and found that Randall had most likely choked Evans and Pugh for pleasure, not to kill them. Accordingly, the conviction for first-degree murder was replaced with a conviction for second-degree murder in relation to both deaths, and his death sentences were changed to sentences of life imprisonment. Randall was held in Taylor C. I. Annex, Perry, Florida.

The murders of Evans and Pugh have been featured on true crime television shows including Forensic Files (season 6, "Treads and Threads"); The New Detectives (season 6, "Left at the Scene"); and Evil Lives Here (season 4, "In the Lion's Cage").

== Other deaths ==
Randall was alleged to have been involved in other deaths in Massachusetts and Florida, including that of LaDonna Roberts Steller. Steller's nude body was found about 11 a.m. on July 30, 1994, in weeds on a vacant lot in the 600 block of Drew Street in Clearwater. The initial investigations that linked Randall to the deaths of Evans and Pugh involved inquiry into a series of deaths involving female victims, many of them prostitutes, who were killed by strangulation and whose bodies were found naked. Randall was also considered a suspect in the murder of Peggy Darnell, who was killed on November 18, 1995.

The St Petersburg Times reported that when the imprisoned Randall was informed by detectives he would be charged with the murders of Cynthia Pugh and Wendy Evans, he replied, "Is that all?"

Although investigations are continuing, no charges were laid against Randall relating to other deaths.
