= Caleb Fairley =

American murderer (born 1973)

- Born: October 21, 1973 (age 52); Gulph Mills, Pennsylvania
- Status: Incarcerated
- Convictions: First degree murder (2 counts); Abuse of a corpse (2 counts); Theft
- Penalty: Life imprisonment

Details
- Date apprehended: September 12, 1995

Caleb Fairley (born October 21, 1973) is an American murderer from Gulph Mills, Pennsylvania. On September 10, 1995, Fairley murdered Lisa Marie Manderach, aged 29, and her 18-month-old daughter Devon, when the two visited Fairley's mother's Collegeville, Pennsylvania, children's clothing store in which he worked.

== Crime ==
On September 10, 1995, Fairley was working alone at Your Kidz & Mine, the Collegeville children's clothing store owned by his parents. Just before closing time, Lisa Marie Manderach (born September 30, 1965) and her daughter Devon (born February 4, 1994) entered the store. When Fairley realized that they were the only customers present, he locked the doors to the store. He then attempted to sexually assault Lisa Manderach. When she resisted him, he became enraged and strangled her to death. He also strangled her infant daughter. After the murder, he sexually abused Manderach's corpse, then went to an Electric Hellfire Club concert that he had been planning to attend that night.

== Arrest and trial ==
Lisa Manderach had told her husband where she was going. When she did not return home, he contacted local police, who found her car parked outside the store. A search of Your Kidz & Mine revealed stacks of pornography stained with what appeared to be blood and long black hairs consistent with Manderach's. Similar hairs were found in the store's vacuum cleaner. Also present was a large damp spot on the carpet that was later determined to be saliva. The police also noted that peepholes had been drilled into the dressing rooms. Fairley was charged on September 12, 1995, with the murders of the mother and daughter.

When police questioned Fairley, he was wearing a thick coat of makeup on his face. When detectives told him to wipe it off, his face was covered with scratch marks. When they were pointed out to Fairley by authorities, he said he received them in a mosh pit while attending an Electric Hellfire Club concert, at a local club called the Asylum.

When hikers discovered Devon Manderach's strangled body dumped on a hill at Valley Forge National Park, Fairley was charged with two counts of murder and one count of abusing a corpse. According to the HLN television show Forensic Files he led authorities to the body to save himself from the death penalty. Fairley entered a plea bargain in which prosecutors would not seek the death penalty if he would show them the location of Lisa Manderach's body. Fairley upheld his end of the bargain.

Fairley was tried in April 1996 and convicted on two counts of first-degree murder.

On July 24, 1996, Montgomery County Court judge William Carpenter handed down the maximum sentence, two consecutive life terms without chance of parole. Fairley is currently incarcerated at State Correctional Institution – Fayette in La Belle, Pennsylvania.

== Victims' legacy ==
Residents of Limerick, Pennsylvania, raised more than $250,000 over a two-year period to create the Manderach Memorial Playground in honor of Lisa and Devon Manderach; it was dedicated on September 12, 1998.

== Media ==
The Court TV crime documentary series Forensic Files reported on the evidence directly linking Fairley to the murders in the season 6, episode 30 "Shopping Spree", which aired December 10, 2001.

The ID channel series Homicide City focused on this case in an episode aired on April 10, 2019.
