= Forensic Files season 6 =

Forensic Files
- Season 6
- No. of episodes: 30

Release
- Original network: Court TV
- Original release: May 21 – December 10, 2001

Season chronology
- ← Previous; Season 5 Next → Season 7

Forensic Files is an American documentary-style series which reveals how forensic science is used to solve violent crimes, mysterious accidents, and even outbreaks of illness. The series was broadcast on Court TV, narrated by Peter Thomas, and produced by Medstar Television, in association with Court TV Original Productions. It has broadcast 406 episodes since its debut on TLC in 1996 as Medical Detectives.

== Episodes ==
No. overall	No. in season	Title	Original release date
72	1	"Missing in Time"	May 21, 2001
On November 12, 1995, Carolyn Killaby was reported missing after a fight with her husband. She was presumed to be dead, and her husband was the prime suspect. Police were suspicious of a secondary suspect, Dennis Keith Smith, when they found evidence of a suspicious fire in his car. Two tiny drops of blood were found in the burned interior. Traditional DNA testing was difficult, because there was no body for DNA comparison and the man who raised Carolyn was revealed to not be her biological father. But a tiny clue inside the suspect's watchband and a popular television show helped solve the case and catch the killer.
73	2	"Missing Pearl"	May 28, 2001
In 1991, South Portland, Maine resident Pearl A. Bruns is missing after an argument with her husband William "Bill" Bruns. Despite pleas from her children, police insist on treating it as a routine missing person's case. But when an investigation turns up a blood trail that leads to the couple's basement, police are sure that they'll find the victim's body. Initially, they find nothing and the case stalls, until new forensic technology helps investigators find the body. The investigators first use luminol over the cleaned carpet to reveal the blood spatter on the floor and a path down to the basement. Then, they use ground penetrating radar to scan the basement for radiation; they found three feet down, excavated rusted sand everywhere except in a certain area. The body had absorbed the rust and was found there.
74	3	"Man's Best Friend?"	June 4, 2001
On January 4, 1989, 4-year-old April Renee Tucker was found bleeding profusely from a severe leg wound in the backyard of her Emory, Texas home. She was hospitalized and pronounced dead shortly after arrival. Her mother Debbie Loveless and step-father John Harvey Miller told police that she was attacked by neighborhood dogs. Investigators did not agree and believed that April's wounds were not dog bites, but slashing injuries, consistent with knife wounds. John and Debbie were found guilty of murder and sentenced to life in prison. Five years later, a forensic scientist saw something in the crime scene photographs that had been missed the first time around.
75	4	"Hand Delivered"	June 11, 2001
In 1995, police in San Diego, California are baffled by a pair of hands found in a dumpster. Through further investigation, they determine that the hands are those of missing person Don Hardin. With this knowledge, the police focus on local homeless man Dale Whitmer, who had lived with Hardin around the time of his disappearance. However, they can find no forensic evidence on Whitmer, and the case goes cold. About one year later, investigators receive an anonymous letter with information about the crime that had been withheld from the press—information only the killer (or someone close to the killer) would know. Laser technology helps to identify the address from where the anonymous letter was mailed, which leads them to Mormon Bishop Mark Davis. Davis cites the privilege between clergy and church member as a reason to not disclose the source of the information, but a judge rules that since Davis sent the letter, he must identify the source. The source was Dale Whitmer's daughter Andrea, who ultimately chooses to testify against her father. Whitmer was sentenced to 15 to life for second-degree murder.
76	5	"Death Play"	June 18, 2001
In 1993, 16-year-old Marie Robards suffered the devastating loss of her father Steve Robards. The death was ruled the result of cardiac arrest. One year later, she won a part in her high school production of Shakespeare's Hamlet. The lines that she was required to recite onstage were more than the thoughts and feelings of her character; they struck a chord, and hinted at her own inner turmoil from the secret that she had been hiding: barium acetate obtained in her high school chemistry class.
77	6	"Fire Dot Com"	June 25, 2001
On October 19, 1996, 17-month-old Josh Hinson died in a fire in his Tabor City, North Carolina home. A federal agency ruled that the fire was intentionally set, and Josh's mother Terri Strickland was charged with murder. But are government scientists, with all of their resources, always right? Using the then-emerging resources of the internet, Terri Strickland undertook her own investigation. An independent fire investigator was able to poke enough holes in the government's scientific conclusions to raise serious questions about whether the fire was arson or an accident.
78	7	"Mistaken for Dead"	July 2, 2001
In 1988, when a patient identified as Gene Hanson dies unexpectedly in the office of neurologist Dr. Richard Boggs, police in Glendale, California begin what they think will be a routine investigation. What they find throws doubt on the time of death and the identity of Hanson and raises questions about the doctor's role in his death. Soon they uncover a bizarre story of corpse stealing, fake identities, and sexual perversion—all part of an elaborate insurance case that would center on what actually caused the victim's death: a sex act gone wrong or premeditated murder?
79	8	"Frozen Evidence"	July 9, 2001
In 1992, two masked gunmen enter the home of Ward and Diana Maracle in Tyendinaga Mohawk Territory, Ontario to rob them, but Ward was shot in the head. This is the story of one investigator, whose quick thinking and knowledge of science enabled him to capture a shoe impression made in snow before the evidence melted away. Knowledge of the shoe led investigators to Peter Benedict and Frank Lanoue, who were convicted of aggravated assault and robbery.
80	9	"Soft Touch"	July 16, 2001
In March 1990, 22-year-old Dawn Bruce was raped, sodomized, and murdered in her Henrico County, Virginia apartment. The killer left very little evidence, but investigators did notice a blood smear on a pillow case that appeared to have been made by one of the killer's fingers. New technology enabled investigators to identify a fingerprint from the cloth surface of the pillow case. This gave police the means to apprehend Robert Douglas Knight. Upon seeing all the evidence against him, Knight pled guilty to Dawn’s murder and was sentenced to four life terms.
81	10	"Church Disappearance"	July 23, 2001
On November 10, 1981, six-year-old Cassie Hansen disappeared from her St. Paul, Minnesota church during an evening service. After a tip from a witness that an older man was seen carrying a small body, Cassie's body was found in a dumpster the next day. The FBI created a psychological profile of the perpetrator but were still unable to find the killer. Dorothy Noga contacted police to let them know that Stuart Knowlton was a massage client that liked to discuss his fantasies during his weekly massages and that one fantasy he spoke of closely resembled the church abduction, which caught her attention. Knowlton had also asked Noga to be his alibi on the night of the murder. Even though she was later attacked by Knowlton and stabbed 32 times, Noga testified against Knowlton in the trial. Knowlton was sentenced to life and died in prison in 2006.
82	11	"Photo Finish"	July 30, 2001
In 1995 in Los Angeles, California, model Linda Sobek goes missing. A park employee discovers photographs and some vital pieces of information in a dumpster, which eventually led investigators to professional photographer Charles Rathbun. Rathbun claims Sobek died during a consensual sexual encounter gone wrong, but Sobek's corpse and some high tech digital imagery tell a more sinister story. Rathbun was obsessed with Linda, and upon seeing an opportunity during the photo shoot, he raped and killed her before dumping the body. Rathbun was sentenced to life in prison.
83	12	"Whodunit"	August 6, 2001
In 1998, an evening out at an Easton, Maryland murder mystery theatre performance turns into a real life whodunit when the badly burned body of Stephen Hricko is discovered in his hotel room after a fire. Upon initial investigation, it appeared to be an accidental fire, but lies, greed, and medical trickery cannot match the skills of forensic scientists, who bring the curtain down on Stephen's killer, his cheating wife Kimberly Hricko, who is convicted of his murder.
84	13	"Horse Play"	August 13, 2001
In 1980, Hillsdale County, Michigan resident Shannon Mohr died in what was reported to be a horseback riding accident by her new husband David Davis. After her death, Shannon's family reported to police their suspicions that Davis seemed far from grief-stricken. Upon further investigation, it was discovered that Davis had poisoned Shannon with succinylcholine, an anaesthetic drug used to induce paralysis. After several years evading justice, Davis was finally arrested in American Samoa in 1989, having found work as a pilot. He was extradited to Michigan, where he was found guilty of first-degree murder and sentenced to life without parole.
85	14	"Treads and Threads"	August 20, 2001
In 1995, a serial killer was strangling prostitutes in the Tampa, Florida area, then taunting police by leaving the bodies in plain sight. The only clues were a tire impression and some threads. By the time scientists identify the source of these treads and the threads, police discover that the killer James Randall was right under their noses the entire time.
86	15	"Killer's "Cattle" Log"	August 27, 2001
In 1989, when police in Mooresville, Missouri are called to retrieve a dead body, they do a background check on the victim. The trail leads them into a bizarre web of homeless drifters, cattle auctions and bad checks—all fronted by elderly couple Ray and Faye Copeland with a penchant for money and murder.
87	16	"Skin of Her Teeth"	September 3, 2001
In 1996, a human skull retrieved from a Hamilton, Ohio pond reveals a ghastly crime. Markings on the skull indicate that the victim had been stabbed multiple times and that the teeth had been removed with needle-nose pliers, in an attempt to keep the victim's identity a secret. A mitochondrial DNA match between the skull and the victim's 18-month-old son was used to positively identify the remains as 21-year-old Tina Elaine Mott, who was reported missing two months earlier. Investigators focus on Tina's live-in boyfriend Timothy Bradford, and faced with the forensic evidence against him, Bradford confessed to killing Mott by accident and dismembering her out of fear, and was sentenced to 18 to 25 years in prison.
88	17	"Line of Fire"	September 10, 2001
In 1996, when a fundamentalist group starts attacking and robbing banks in the Spokane, Washington area, authorities know immediately that they are dealing with experienced criminals. A tip leads them to Sandpoint, Idaho residents Verne Jay Merrell, Robert S. Berry, and Charles Barbee, and the evidence found at their homes is extensive and incriminating. In court, two juries are presented with a combination of old fashioned forensic science and the latest in crime technology in order to render a verdict.
89	18	"Bad Blood"	September 17, 2001
In 1992, in Kipling, Saskatchewan, Dr. John Schneeberger is accused of sedating and sexually assaulting one of his female patients and his step-daughter. DNA tests demonstrate that the doctor is innocent, but the female patient still insists that he sedated and raped her. On three occasions, blood was taken from the doctor's arm for DNA testing, and each time, the results exonerated Schneeberger. Seven years later, a private investigator takes lip balm from Schneeberger's car and has it DNA-tested, and the results were a match to the perpetrator. A more thorough DNA analysis conducted later, this time including blood from his finger and a hair sample, revealed a match. In court, Schneeberger revealed how he had beaten the DNA test: he had inserted a plastic tube filled with the blood of another patient into his left arm. The blood tested in his earlier DNA test was taken from that tube. He was found guilty of sexual assault and obstructing justice and sentenced to 6 years in prison. Schneeberger had his medical license revoked and was subsequently deported to his native South Africa.
90	19	"Pure Evil"	September 24, 2001
Creating a profile of a serial killer, is part science and part intuition. The science involves studying criminals who have committed similar crimes, to see what characteristics they all have in common. One common trait among serial killers, is a past history of abusing animals. In the 1993 search for the killer of two teenagers, Brian King and Christina Benjamin, in Telico, Texas, a behavioral profile led to suspect Jason Massey—and hard science proved the profile was correct. Massey was executed by lethal injection on April 3, 2001.
91	20	"Root of all Evil"	October 1, 2001
In 1981, Charlotte Grabbe, wife of prominent Marshall, Illinois farmer Fred Grabbe, disappeared from her farm without a trace. For three years, investigators searched in vain for any trace of Charlotte. Eventually, Fred Grabbe's former lover came forward with a fantastic tale of rage, murder, mutilation and cremation, but there seemed to be no way to test the validity of her story. That is, until a plant pathologist and a dendrochronologist conducted some tests on the plant life where the cremation supposedly occurred, which led to a surprising revelation.
92	21	"Where the Blood Drops"	October 8, 2001
When someone dies under mysterious circumstances, the spouse almost always is a suspect—especially if they are in bed, sleeping beside the individual at the time of their death. In 1987, Susie Mowbray was charged for her husband Bill Mowbray's death in Brownsville, Texas, which had the appearance of suicide. Her son was so convinced of her innocence that he enrolled in law school, studied all of the evidence and, eventually, discovered the truth of what really happened that fateful night between his mother and father. Eventually, he proved that Bill had committed suicide to avoid prison time for financial crimes, and Susie was released.
93	22	"Punch Line"	October 15, 2001
In 1994, Rhoda Nathan was found beaten to death in a Blue Ash, Ohio hotel room which she was sharing with her best friend and the friend’s boyfriend. Later, when 42-year-old hotel employee Elwood Jones went to a hospital emergency room for an infected hand, which he said was cut on a dumpster at work, the doctor treating him recognized the injury as something else; a wound sustained from punching someone in the mouth. Police investigation proved that Jones had attempted to rob the room and killed Rhoda when she interrupted him, injuring his hand in the process. Elwood Jones was sentenced to the death penalty for aggravated murder, aggravated burglary, and aggravated robbery.
94	23	"Sibling Rivalry"	October 22, 2001
In 1991, San Francisco, California pornographer Artie Mitchell was murdered in his home. His brother and business partner Jim Mitchell is found near the scene carrying a rifle and, later, confesses to shooting Artie. The question for investigators is whether the shooting was pre-meditated. A 911 call in which the fatal shots can be heard, and a computer reconstruction of the crime scene, provide the answer.
95	24	"Pastoral Care"	October 29, 2001
In 1981, correctional officer Donna Payant disappeared from Green Haven Correctional Facility in Beekman, New York and was later found in a landfill. The medical examiner not only identified the cause of death but also found an important clue. It was a signature element of a murder committed by Lemuel Smith 10 years earlier, which was also investigated by the medical examiner. Upon further investigation, it was discovered that Smith was an inmate at the same prison and could have committed the crime. But, did he? Prosecutors soon proved he did, out of anger over Donna rejecting his advances, and Smith was moved to solitary confinement upon conviction.
96	25	"Bagging a Killer"	November 5, 2001
In 1999, nine-year-old Valiree Jackson vanished on her way to school near Spokane, Washington. Her father Brad Jackson reported the disappearance and the entire community started searching for her abductor. As police began the investigation, they wondered if her long-lost mother Rosanne Pleasant might be connected to the disappearance. Police used GPS tracking to follow the perpetrator's movements, which not only led them to Valiree's body but also showed the twisted motive in the perpetrator's mind. The Secret Service finds a hidden fingerprint to help detectives seal the case; Brad had killed his daughter because he felt his girlfriend didn’t like her, and he was sentenced to 56 years in prison.
97	26	"Double Trouble"	November 12, 2001
In 1995, when off-duty Maine State Trooper Vicki Gardner is raped and sodomized by Steven Fortin during a routine stop, it triggers a chain of events which jumpstarts a stalled murder case in New Jersey. The Maine attack appears strikingly similar to the brutal sexual assault and murder of Melissa Padilla in Woodbridge, New Jersey in 1994. There is very little forensic evidence in the New Jersey crime, but the signature the killer left behind—the ritualistic bite mark similarities in both of these crimes—identified him just as convincingly as a DNA match. Fortin was sentenced to death for the murder of Melissa Padilla.
98	27	"Cats, Flies & Snapshots"	November 19, 2001
In 1989, 19-year-old Lori Ann Auker left her Northumberland County, Pennsylvania home for work but never arrived. Police investigators viewed this case as a missing persons or possible homicide and focus on her estranged husband Robert Auker. It takes space-age technology, cat hairs, and insects to pinpoint the image of the woman's abductor before the real story can be told. Investigators soon proved that Robert had killed Lori to obtain custody of their child, and he was sentenced to die. However, Robert’s subsequent appeal was successful, and his sentence was commuted to life without parole.
99	28	"Naked Justice"	November 26, 2001
In 1999, expectant mother Leann Fletcher is reported dead in her Hazel Park, Michigan home of an accidental gunshot wound to the head. Was the wound self-inflicted, and if it was, why would this young mother with so much to live for kill herself? Forensic computer analysis, blood spatter analysis, and a painstaking investigation led police to the truth that her lawyer husband Michael "Mick" Fletcher had motive to kill Leann because he was having a sexual affair with local judge Susan Chrzanowski. Forensic evidence eventually proved Mick had killed Leanne and he was sentenced to life for second-degree murder.
100	29	"Treading Not So Lightly"	December 3, 2001
In 1980, 4-year-old Vicky Lyons is found unconscious in a Big Spring, Texas parking lot with severe head trauma. Police concluded it was a hit-and-run vehicle accident and left it at that. But Vicky's mother Crystal suspected there was more to the story and was determined to find out exactly what had happened. Being a fan of murder mysteries and forensic science shows, Crystal used much of what she had learned to determine who was responsible for the accident, which permanently injured her daughter.
101	30	"Shopping Spree"	December 10, 2001
In 1995, Lisa Manderach and her daughter Devon left their Limerick, Pennsylvania home to go shopping in Collegeville, Pennsylvania but did not return home at the expected time. Lisa's husband Jimmy called police to report their disappearance, and he directed them to a nearby shopping center. Later that day, Devon's body was found dumped off of a roadside, but there was no sign of Lisa. Looking further into the store that Lisa had said that she was going to, police shift their focus to store employee Caleb Fairley. Clothing fibers and Devon’s saliva in the carpet of the store unveiled the truth; Fairley was not only a pervert, but was also obsessed with an image of a female vampire that physically resembled Lisa. Upon seeing the mother and daughter were alone in the store, Fairley locked them in and tried to rape Lisa, but ended up strangling her, doing the same to Devon to keep her quiet. Fairley was convicted of both murders and was sentenced to two life terms, as prosecutors had previously agreed not to pursue the death penalty after he led them to Lisa’s body.
