= Give Me Your Hand (novel) =

2018 novel by Megan Abbott

- Author: Megan Abbott
- Language: English
- Genre: Thriller
- Publisher: Little, Brown and Company
- Publication date: July 17, 2018
- Publication place: United States
- Pages: 352
- ISBN: 978-1509855681

Give Me Your Hand is a 2018 thriller novel by American author Megan Abbott. The book follows Kit Owens and Diane Fleming, two postdoctoral research scientists studying premenstrual dysphoric disorder, as each grapples with the consequences of a secret the other has revealed to them. The story alternates between their experiences and relationship in high school and in college.

Published by Little, Brown and Company on July 17, 2018, the novel parallels Gothic fiction, with references to Shakespeare's Hamlet and Macbeth, physicist Marie Curie, poet Sylvia Plath, and Lizzie Borden. It was inspired by the story of Marie Robards and the 2009 murder of graduate student Annie Le, as well as the competitiveness of research labs. The novel was generally well-received, receiving starred reviews from Booklist and Publishers Weekly and appearing on various lists of the best books of 2018. It was praised by reviewers for subverting the themes of the hysterical woman and the femme fatale, instead analyzing gender, class, and the complex relationships between women.

== Plot ==
Kit Owens is a postdoctoral research scientist in the lab of Dr. Lena Severin, who is preparing to begin a groundbreaking study on premenstrual dysphoric disorder (PMDD), an extreme form of PMS. The five postdocs – Zell, Juwon, Maxim, Alex, and Kit – are competing for three spots on the study, when Severin announces a new hire, Diane Fleming. Switching between the present day and Kit's high school years, it is revealed that the summer before sophomore year, she met Diane at a cross-country camp. During an overnight trip, Kit shares a secret with Diane that she had a sexual encounter with an adult, nicknamed Stevie Shoes. In their senior year, Diane transfers to Kit's high school following the death of her father and her mother's move to Florida with her new boyfriend, and the two became lab partners in AP Chemistry. Diane encourages Kit to apply for Severin's STEM scholarship for women.

While studying together, Diane tells Kit she killed her father, with the hope that she would be able to move back in with her mother. Following the confession, Kit refuses to be friends with Diane but, following her mother's advice, does not report it to the police. She instead tells the school guidance counselor, Ms. Castro, who writes the Severin scholarship indicating Diane could have been responsible for her father's death. Kit is awarded the scholarship and attends the state university where Severin works.

In the present day, Kit and Alex go to a bar, where she gets drunk on Long Island iced teas and confesses Diane's secret to him before the two have sex. The next day, Severin announces that one of the PMDD slots is going to Serge, the head lab tech. Diane tells Kit she has been chosen for the other slot but, following her confession to Alex, he messages Kit that he is going to tell Severin about Diane's secret. She goes to the lab the next morning to convince him not to tell Severin and following an argument, he puts too much pressure on a flash column and the test tube explodes, killing him. Unbeknownst to her, Diane is in the lab and, believing that Kit killed Alex, tells her to leave the body to be discovered but removes any evidence that Kit was there.

When they return to the lab, the body is gone and no one knows Alex is dead. The only one who seems concerned is Eleanor, who explains that she is Alex's fiancée. The police are brought in to investigate his disappearance and when they question Kit, they seem to know about her romantic involvement with Alex. She has two realizations: that Zell saw them at the bar and told the police, and that Diane was rejected as a participant in a previous study on PMDD. She goes to confront Diane but discovers Eleanor in the vivarium. Eleanor accuses Kit of killing Alex and after a struggle, a fan is unplugged and Kit hears noises from the ceiling. When Eleanor leaves, the ceiling breaks, dropping Alex's body onto Kit and Diane. Serge admits to hiding the body on behalf of Severin, as they both believed Diane had killed Alex. Diane puts cyanide in Serge's tea, killing him. Severin walks in and proposes that they blame Serge for Alex's death but when the police arrive, Diane confesses to killing Alex, Serge, and her father. Severin reveals that Diane believed she suffered from PMDD and had undergone a hysterectomy. As Diane is leaving with the police, she kills herself with a specimen knife.

Ten years later, Kit is still working for Severin when she receives a letter from Diane's mother, Mrs. Fleming. The letter reveals that Diane had confessed to killing her father but Mrs. Fleming had not believed her. She also sends a photo and Kit realizes Mrs. Fleming's boyfriend at the time was Stevie Shoes and Diane had been kicked out of her mother's house for telling her about his affair with Kit.

== Background and publication ==
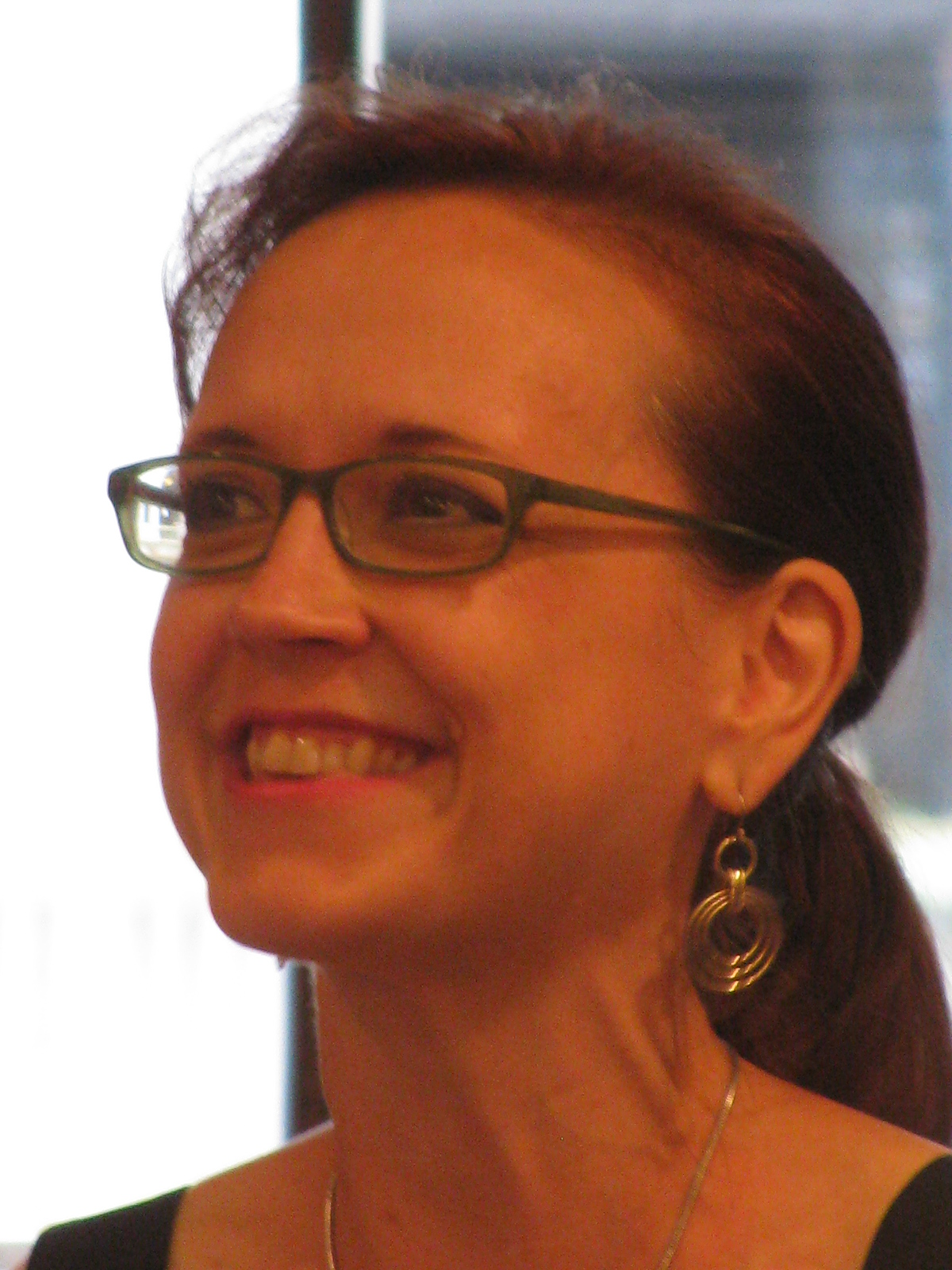
Megan Abbott in 2014

The focus on sharing secrets was one of the first things that author Megan Abbott planned when writing Give Me Your Hand. The novel was originally intended to focus on teenagers but Abbott shied away from writing another story about sports and instead focused on a quote by physicist Marie Curie which is repeated throughout the book: "My head is so full of plans that it seems aflame". Abbott interviewed female scientists in order to describe the lab dynamics and read memoirs and biographies of scientists. She was intrigued by the competitiveness of labs, particularly stories of scientists sabotaging each other. The character of Severin was inspired by professors at New York University, where Abbott studied for her PhD.

Abbott was first inspired to write about PMDD when she learned it had previously been used as a criminal defense. She drew inspiration from a 1996 Texas Monthly article about Marie Robards, who was a high school student who poisoned her father in February 1993. Robards used barium acetate and her father's death was ruled a heart attack until she confessed her crime to her best friend, Stacey High, nearly a year later while the two were studying Claudius's soliloquy in Hamlet. Unlike in Give Me Your Hand, High reported the crime to the police and Robards was arrested in October 1994. The novel also took inspiration from the 2009 murder of graduate student Annie Le at a lab at Yale University, where the deceased victim was hidden in a wall.

Give Me Your Hand was published on July 17, 2018, by Little, Brown and Company in the United States and by Picador in the United Kingdom. The title comes from a quote by Lady Macbeth immediately before her sleepwalking scene. It is Abbott's ninth novel. The audiobook was read by Chloe Cannon and released by Hachette Audio in July 2018. The novel was optioned by AMC for a potential television series before its publication date.

== Themes ==
Give Me Your Hand is noted for its parallels to Gothic and noir fiction although it subverts the typical role of women – in one scene while they are in high school, Kit chooses Hamlet as a role model rather than Ophelia. It makes several references, literary and otherwise, including to the novels Wuthering Heights (1847) and Carrie (1974), the films Casablanca (1942) and Hands on a Hard Body (1977), the singer Juice Newton, and the murder suspect Lizzie Borden. While writing, Abbott listened to recordings of Sylvia Plath's poetry, which appears throughout the novel. Give Me Your Hand and Abbott's 2016 novel You Will Know Me were both influenced by Alfred Hitchcock.

Severin – unflappable and calm – is used as a foil to the women with PMDD that she studies. The focus on the diagnosis is a metaphor for women's loss of control and a theme throughout the novel of women trying to distance themselves from the stereotypes of their gender. Abbott wrote the book during the 2016 United States presidential election, when she took remarks Donald Trump made about Megyn Kelly having "blood coming out of her wherever" (Note: Critics took Trump's comment to be a reference to menstruation. Trump said he was referring to Kelly's nose.) and Hillary Clinton using the restroom as a "metaphor for demonizing women". Ruth Franklin in Vulture commented that Abbott "plays with cultural constructions of female 'blood rage,' often in a self-consciously ironic way". In one scene, Severin is described as wearing lipstick that is "placenta red". The trope of women succumbing to their hormones is similarly subverted, with Diane's behavior unaffected even after she undergoes a hysterectomy, as well as the classic trope of the femme fatale, which Abbott describes in an interview as "a projection of male anxiety". Severin draws reference in one scene to Lady Macbeth's command to "unsex me", a plea that femininity makes her less capable of murder.

Abbott acknowledged that she focuses on insular communities. A review in The Washington Post praised the claustrophobic feeling that comes from these settings and the portrayal of the ambition and stress of the postdoctoral characters. The characters' internal lives and the lab itself dominate the story, in lieu of the unnamed American town which serves as the outside world. Rather than being a whodunit, a Slate review describes the novel as a "slower-paced Match Point–esque anxiety fest". Although the setting enhances the tension, critics commented that it could be replaced with any similarly demanding workplace. Kit is described as an unreliable narrator, as her unceasing focus on success distracts her from the true nature of the lab, which Alex describes as "a nest of vipers". The insular nature of the lab also affects the morality of those who work inside it.

The novel also emphasizes class. The differences between Diane and Kit are typified by their class differences – Diane is wealthy and conveys an image of perfection while Kit, who has had to temper her expectations due to family circumstances, is hard-working. Whereas Kit's mother brings home the smell of the animal clinic where she works, Diane's mother picks up her daughter from cross-country summer camp in a luxury car. The novel's focus on class affects how Kit views Diane, believing that she has had an easier life because she was raised with money; although Kit juggles her academics with a restaurant job, she sees Diane as wiser. There is a similar class tension in her relationships with her co-workers at the lab, especially with the affluent Alex. In one scene where she gets drunk on Long Island iced teas, he assumes that she has had the drink – a social signifier, described by Abbott as "kind of a trashy drink" – before. This scene undercuts the unspoken class divide that runs between them.

== Reception ==
Give Me Your Hand was generally well-received, including starred reviews from Booklist and Publishers Weekly. It was listed as one of the best books of 2018 by Cosmopolitan, Financial Times, Marie Claire, The Observer, and Refinery29. The novel was described by Entertainment Weekly as "one of [Abbott's] biggest and best-reviewed titles to date". The audiobook received similar praise, particularly for Cannon's performance portraying the varying characters and emotions. The novel was nominated for the 2018 Los Angeles Times Book Prize for Mystery/Thriller and was a finalist for the 2019 Anthony Award for Best Novel and the CWA Ian Fleming Steel Dagger.

The book was commended for its detailed focus, suspenseful pace, and convincing villain. A review in the Financial Times described the prose as having the "vividness of cinema". Karen Brissette in the Los Angeles Review of Books praised the novel's haunting nature and the nuance of the relationships between the female characters, which were described as "intimate and feral" by Publishers Weekly. The New York Times's Ruth Ware compared the focus on female friendship and competition to Abbott's Dare Me and You Will Know Me, despite Give Me Your Hand's departure from teenage athletics. A review in Newsday praised the high school chapters and the balance between the characters' teenage and adult years.

The initial twist – the reveal of Diane's secret – has been described as predictable, although reviewers commented that the later twists were unexpected. The A.V. Club commended the novel's portrayal of women's darker identities but argued that the first third of the novel proceeds at too slow of a pace. Ware described Kit and Diane's motives as sometimes appearing "opaque" and criticized some of the confusing actions that characters take during the scenes set in the present day, although she stated that this could have been a conscious choice by Abbott.
