= Gina Fattore =

American film producer (born 1968)

- Born: Gina Lynn Fattore; June 18, 1968 (age 58); Kankakee, Illinois, USA
- Education: Columbia University (BA)
- Occupation: Television Writer
- Years active: 2000 – present
- Known for: co-creating Dare Me with Megan Abbott

Gina Lynn Fattore (born June 18, 1968, in Kankakee, Illinois, USA) is an American producer known for her creation of USA Network series Dare Me. She was also a producer and writer for popular TV shows such as Dawson's Creek, Gilmore Girls, and Parenthood.

== Biography ==
Fattore grew up in Valparaiso, Indiana. She graduated from Columbia University in 1990 as an English major. Her classmates included television writers Jeff Rake and Academy Award-winning film producer Dede Gardner. After college, she worked at the New York Public Library's fundraising office under Judy Daniels, whose son Greg Daniels would later become creator of The Office. She was encouraged by her then boss to work for her son as an assistant. Fattore accepted the job and relocated to Los Angeles and began her career in the entertainment industry.

Her first assignment was Daniels' King of the Hill, where she got her first writing credit as staff writer. She then joined the crew of Dawson's Creek and rose from a writer to the show's co-executive producer for Season 5 and 6. She wrote the episode titled "True Love," in which a scene showing a crying Dawson Leery became the subject of a longstanding internet meme.

She went on to work on other hit series and became a co-producer and writer of such hit TV shows as Gilmore Girls, Parenthood, and Californication.

In 2012, she signed an overall deal with Universal TV to produce content for the channel and sold a multi-cultural family drama titled Holiday to the network.

In April 2020, she published a novel titled The Spinster Diaries, which follows the life of a fictional Los Angeles television writer as she navigates work, love life, and the diagnosis of a benign tumor that drew parts of the plot from her own life.

In August 2020, Fattore signed an overall deal with Universal Content Productions to create and develop scripted fare for all platforms for the studio.

== Filmography ==
Year	Title	Notes
2000-2003	Dawson's Creek	Co-executive producer, co-producer, writer
2003-2004	Skin	Co-executive producer, writer
2005-2006	Reunion	Co-executive producer, writer
2006-2007	Gilmore Girls	Co-executive producer, writer
2007-2009	Californication	Co-executive producer, writer
2013-2014	Parenthood	Co-executive producer, writer
2015	Red Band Society	Writer, 1 episode
2015	Masters of Sex	Writer, 1 episode
2016	Better Things	Writer, 1 episode
2016	Unreal	Consulting producer
2019-2020	Dare Me	Co-creator, executive producer
2026	Off Campus	Show runner, executive producer

== Awards and nominations ==
Fattore was nominated for a 2010 Producers Guild Award for her work on Californication and a 2016 Writers Guild of America Award for Television: New Series for writing Better Things.
