= The End of Everything (Abbott novel) =

2011 novel by Megan Abbott

- Author: Megan Abbott
- Language: English
- Genre: Psychological thriller
- Publisher: Reagan Arthur
- Publication date: July 7, 2011
- Publication place: United States
- Pages: 256 pp
- ISBN: 9780316097796
- OCLC: 652446291
- Dewey Decimal: 813/.6

The End of Everything is a 2011 novel by American author Megan Abbott. It follows Lizzie Hood, a thirteen-year-old girl, after the alleged kidnapping of her best friend, Evie Verver. Lizzie finds herself growing closer to Evie's family, particularly her father Mr. Verver, as she tries to uncover what happened to her friend. The novel, which has drawn comparisons to the novel Lolita and to the Oakland County Child Killer case, is Abbott's first novel not to fall within the period noir genre.

Published by Reagan Arthur on July 7, 2011, the novel was generally well-received, particularly for its portrayal of the female characters and the complex relationships between teenagers and adults. It was named one of the best books of 2011 by The Boston Globe and Washington Examiner, and was a finalist for the 2012 Anthony Award for Best Mystery. The novel was described by Publishers Weekly as Abbott's break-out novel.

== Plot ==
Lizzie Hood and Evie Verver are next-door neighbors, thirteen years old and inseparable. Lizzie is fascinated by Evie's family: her reclusive mother, her glamorous older sister Dusty, and her father, whose attention Lizzie craves. One day, Evie vanishes after school and Lizzie is questioned about the disappearance, although she cannot remember anything. She later remembers Evie showing her some cigarette butts in their backyard and telling her that a man would look through her window at night. She tells Mr. Verver about the cigarettes but not the man and later remembers that on the day of the disappearance, she saw a maroon Buick Skylark belonging to their neighbor, Mr. Shaw.

Lizzie remembers being in the lake with Evie as children and nearly drowning, before Mr. Verver saved her. The police search Mr. Shaw's house but cannot find anything. Lizzie starts to believe she imagined it was Mr. Shaw's car, but Dusty insists it was. When a rumor goes around school that Evie drowned herself, Lizzie remembers seeing Mr. Shaw smoking and finds cigarettes hidden behind his office. That night, she searches his backyard, finding cigarettes and a photo of her and Evie in his milk chute. She hides what she finds in her milk chute and directs Mr. Verver to find it.

Lizzie gets closer to Mr. Verver, taking Dusty's spot for long nightly chats. When the police tell Mr. Verver that they found a body, even though it was not Evie, Lizzie suddenly realizes Evie could be dead. She breaks into Mr. Shaw's house and is caught by his son, Pete, who tells her that he sent money to his father at a motel. Lizzie protects him and tells Mr. Verver that Evie called her from the motel. When the police arrive, the motel manager says Mr. Shaw had been staying there under a fake name, with a girl he said was his daughter, but they are no longer there. Pete admits to Lizzie that he told his mother what he did and she called Mr. Shaw to warn him.

After Lizzie spends another evening talking with Mr. Verver, Dusty confronts her and claims Evie knew Mr. Shaw was watching her and that she wanted him to take her away. That night, Evie returns home. Dusty refuses to speak to her sister, but Lizzie stays with Evie constantly, waiting to hear what happened. Mr. Shaw dies by suicide in the Ververs' backyard and is discovered by Evie and Lizzie. Shortly after, Evie tells Lizzie that she asked Mr. Shaw to take her away and she knew he had been watching her. In the car, he told her that he had loved her since he rescued her from the lake as a child. She tells Lizzie that because he saved her, she consented to sex with him.

Lizzie's mother's boyfriend, Dr. Aiken, tells Lizzie that after Evie disappeared, he examined Dusty and she had scratches that she claimed were from field hockey. Lizzie confronts Dusty, who admits that she saw Mr. Shaw in their backyard and she confronted Evie the day she disappeared. The two of them fought: Dusty saying Evie was disgusting for wanting Mr. Shaw's attention and Evie asking how it was different than Dusty's relationship with Mr. Verver. Mr. Shaw intervened and Evie left with him. Neither sister will tell the truth because they do not want to hurt their father. At the end of the book, Lizzie's mother tells her Mr. Shaw had rescued her from drowning as a child, even though Lizzie thought it was Mr. Verver and Mr. Shaw thought he had rescued Evie.

== Background and publication ==
The End of Everything was the first novel that Megan Abbott tried to write in 1994, while she was in graduate school in her early 20s. Inspired by a PBS documentary about a girl who had either been abducted by, or run away with, an older man and by the novel Lolita, she started writing a novel about the relationship between a young girl and an older man. At the time, she struggled with the plot and ultimately set it aside for the next decade while she published her first four novels, all of which were noir fiction. When she decided to take a break from the genre following the publication of Bury Me Deep in 2009, she returned to her earlier draft, intending to cover similar themes in a new setting. The End of Everything was Abbott's first novel with a contemporary setting and a teenage protagonist.

The setting – a Midwestern suburb in the 1980s – was inspired by Abbott's childhood growing up in Grosse Pointe, Michigan, where Jeffrey Eugenides's 1993 novel The Virgin Suicides is set. The Ververs were influenced by the family of her childhood best friend Meg, who were similarly idealized by Abbott until her friend's brother was killed in a boating accident at a time when she and Meg were beginning to become more distant. The character of Mr. Verver was similarly inspired by a friend's father on whom she had a childhood crush. She modeled the character of Lizzie as "a Grimm's fairy tale version of a Nancy Drew". In a 2020 article for The New York Times, Abbott wrote that she was repeatedly asked whether the novel was inspired by the Oakland County Child Killer, who kidnapped four children in 1976 and 1977 from a Detroit suburb. Although she was living 15 miles (24 km) away at the time, she had forgotten the events but remembered the sense of danger, feelings that often appear in her writing. She often listened to the song "You Don't Have to Say You Love Me" by Dusty Springfield while writing and has cited the television series Twin Peaks as a big influence.

The novel was published on July 7, 2011, by Reagan Arthur (which became part of Little, Brown) in the United States and on August 5, 2011, by Picador in the United Kingdom. The audiobook was read by Emily Bauer and released by Blackstone Audio. Both Time and Entertainment Weekly described it as one of the biggest novels of 2011 and Publishers Weekly described it as Abbott's break-out novel. In 2011, she was listed as one of the '23 Writers We Adore' by Time, on a list with Salman Rushdie and Jonathan Franzen.

== Themes ==
The novel explores the themes of growing up and losing innocence. Abbott chose to make Lizzie thirteen in the novel because it was the age that she was first conscious of developing desire for boys and becoming uncomfortable around other girls. It was an age she described in an interview as "that noisy hinge between childhood and adolescent tumult", an age of hyperbole in which "every day something happens that seems like it's 'the end of everything'". Throughout the novel, the adult world is viewed "through screen doors, crawling through neighbours' lawns at night" and Lizzie and Evie are curious about it without truly appreciating the potential consequence. Lizzie struggles throughout the novel with being caught between childhood and adulthood.

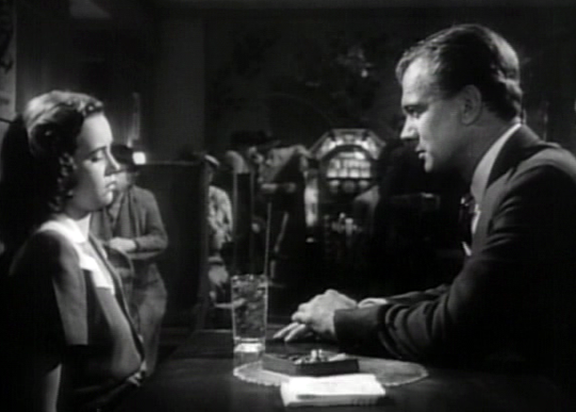
The relationship between Charlie and her uncle from Shadow of a Doubt influenced the relationships in The End of Everything.

The novel was praised by The Boston Globe for subverting the trope of the adolescent girl as a victim and instead discussing the complex relationships these girls can have with older men. The End of Everything explores these power dynamics and the uneasiness men have with their daughters as they age, similar to a passage in Abbott’s earlier novel Queenpin where the narrator recalls her father stopped sitting on her bed to wish her good night as she grew older. Adults become uncomfortable with their children as they age and explore their natural sexuality. Abbott spoke in an interview with The Sewanee Review about the assertion that her novels contain pseudo-incestuous relationships, arguing that our adulthood and view of relationships are shaped by our families. She compared the romantic relationship in The End of Everything to the relationship between Charlie and her uncle in Alfred Hitchcock's 1943 film Shadow of a Doubt. The childhood crush that Lizzie has on Mr. Verver was described by her as "completely appropriate and utterly romantic", one shared by many other women. Despite criticism from readers about his portrayal, Abbott considers Mr. Verver to be careless but not purposely malicious, unaware of the impact that his actions have on the young girls around him.

== Reception ==
The End of Everything was generally well-received, including a starred review from Publishers Weekly. It was listed as one of the best books of 2011 by Publishers Weekly, The Boston Globe, and the Washington Examiner. The novel was a finalist for the 2012 Anthony Award for Best Mystery. Several reviews noted its similarity to Abbott's previous novels, describing it as "pre-noir" and "noir at its finest". Reviewers have also compared the novel to those by Tana French, Kate Atkinson, and Judy Blume, as well as to Alice Sebold's novel The Lovely Bones. Despite these comparisons, it received praise from the Los Angeles Times and Library Journal for its original take on the coming-of-age story.

The Huffington Post praised the novel for its erotic prose and its sinister portrayal of Mr. Verver, describing Abbott as "a scalpel to the origins of incest". The review went on to commend the way Abbott writes about sex "in a circuitous fashion" and "in the margins of her pages", as something that clearly impacts her characters but is not described graphically. The portrayal of the "near-creepiness" of the relationship between Dusty and Mr. Verver was also noted in a review by Susannah Meadows for The New York Times. Nick Hornby, in an article for The Believer, similarly commented that "sex hangs over the suburb like some sort of tropical mist", in a novel of "transgressive and occasionally sinister sexual chaos". He commended Abbott for the way she handled the plot, balancing her primarily female characters between the roles of victim and instigator, in a difficult topic area of young women pursuing older men. The young women in the novel are "so complicit, so responsible for this fog of repressed sexual yearning" but "[Abbott] knows what she’s doing, even if her characters don't". The mysteries of the novel remain unsolved at its end, asking questions about motivation, sex, and whether Lizzie can be believed.

The novel received a critical review from Leah Greenblatt in Entertainment Weekly, who gave the book a B− rating and argued that its interesting story was hidden behind overwrought prose. Booklist praised the novel's "dreamy, first-person narrative", which moves easily between the present and past, and the characterization of Lizzie, who "just does things, without good reason, on instincts that, though twisted, are true". The ending chapters were criticized for being too expository. The novel received criticism from one Elle reviewer for its plot twist, which was described as possibly "leav[ing] some feeling frustrated, aghast, and slighted by an author unwilling to unveil the truth and entrust us with it".

A review of The End of Everything in The Times praised in particular the scenes focusing on Lizzie's obsessive fascination with the Verver family, although it noted that Abbott is occasionally "a tad heavy-handed with the hormones and horror (all that sweat and insomnia and stirrings in the belly) and, in striving so hard to keep the atmosphere erotically charged, her mechanics sometimes begin to show". The novel was described as "accomplished psychological thriller", with a familiar structure subverted by clever twists. Cullen Gallagher for the Los Angeles Review of Books described the novel as "disturbingly, even brutally honest", as Lizzie grapples with her fear and her desire to be at the center of what is happening. He notes in particular a scene where Lizzie tries to understand Evie's kidnapper and feels empathy for how he could fall in love with Evie. Abbott said in an interview that she receives the most critical letters from readers about The End of Everything.
