= The Turnout =

2021 mystery novel by Megan Abbott

- Author: Megan Abbott
- Language: English
- Genre: Mystery
- Publisher: G. P. Putnam's Sons
- Publication date: 2021
- Awards: Los Angeles Times Book Prize for Mystery/Thriller
- ISBN: 9780593084908

The Turnout is a mystery novel by Megan Abbott published August 3, 2021 by G. P. Putnam's Sons. That year, it won the Los Angeles Times Book Prize for Mystery/Thriller.

== Plot ==
The Turnout follows twin sisters Dara and Marie Durant, who grew up in a Victorian home with their father, an electrician, and their mother, a former ballet dancer. Their mother opens The Durant School of Dance and teaches her daughters ballet at home, making ballet central to the girls' identities.

One year, Charlie, one of Mrs. Durant's students, comes to live with them, and Mrs. Durant begins forcing the children into sexual games while she and her husband drink and argue. On their twentieth wedding anniversary, Mr. and Mrs. Durant are involved in a fatal car crash, leaving Dara and Marie to inherit the dance school.

A decade later, Dara, Marie, and Charlie run the dance school and live together in their childhood home. Dara and Charlie have married. Marie moves out of the home, then accidentally sets a fire to one of the dance studios. To fix the studio, the family hires a contractor, Derek, whose presence at the school quickly becomes uncomfortable, especially once Dara learns that he and Marie are having an affair.

Derek becomes overly interested in the Durant home and eventually makes it clear he wants to take it from the Durants. Dara and Charlie confront Derek, which ultimately leads Charlie to push Derek down the stairs to his death, which the Durants report as an accident.

All returns to normal until Dara learns Charlie has been having an affair with Derek's widow. After Dara kicks him out of the house, Charlie hangs himself in the studio attic.

Although the sisters attempt to heal from their shared traumas, Marie ultimately lights the Durant family home on fire before they pursue their own futures.

== Reception ==
The Turnout was generally well-received, including starred reviews from Booklist, Library Journal, and Publishers Weekly. Both Booklist and Library Journal highlighted the "psychosexual" elements of the novel, which "reveal the dark undercurrents of women’s relationships and sexuality." Library Journal added that Abbott's "taut, unsettling writing creates tension through the slightest actions and phrases, and keeps the pages turning." Publishers Weekly noted that Abbott's "look at the darker side of the dance world demonstrates why [she] has few peers at crafting moving stories of secrets and broken lives."

Other reviewers discussed The Turnout's psychosexual themes, as well. The Washington Post said it's "apparent that The Turnout is as much about female rage, jealousy and sexual desire as it is a suspense novel set in a dance studio." Kirkus Reviews writes, "Abbott is a master of thinly veiled secrets often kept by women who rage underneath their delicate exteriors." The New York Times Book Review said the book is "dark and juicy and tinged with horror," indicating that although Abbott "works with mystery and suspense and draws on noir and Gothic tropes, her goal seems less to construct intricate, double-crossing plot problems than to explore the dark side of femininity."

Book Reporter provided a mixed review, at once calling the book "atmospheric, suspenseful and full of marvelously juicy behind-the-scenes details" while also being "bothered by the slightly lurid portrait it presents [of ballet]."

Crime Fiction Lover also provided a mixed review, writing, "Abbott’s take on the world of ballet is anything but sugar coated," and "A sense of brooding menace and cloying claustrophobia exudes from the pages." However, they did not connect with the characters.

Awards for The Turnout
Year	Award	Result	Ref.
2021	Booklist Editors' Choice: Adult Books for Young Adults	Selection	
2021	Los Angeles Times Book Prize for Mystery/Thriller	Winner	
2022	Booklist's Best Mysteries & Thrillers	Top 10	
2022	ITW Thriller Award for Hardcover Novel	Finalist	
