= Murder of Kevin Jiang =

2021 murder in New Haven, Connecticut, United States

- Location: New Haven, Connecticut, U.S.
- Date: February 6, 2021; 5 years ago 8:31 p.m. (UTC-5)
- Attack type: Shooting
- Weapon: .45 calibre handgun
- Deaths: 1
- Victim: Kevin Jiang
- Perpetrator: Qinxuan Pan
- Convictions: Murder

On February 6, 2021, 26-year-old Kevin Jiang, an American graduate student at Yale University, was murdered in New Haven, Connecticut, by 29-year-old Qinxuan Pan. Pan was arrested while in hiding after four months and in April 2024, he was sentenced to 35 years imprisonment at Cheshire Correctional Institution.

The case generated substantial coverage due to the manhunt for Pan and was subject of an episode of 48 Hours in January 2025.

== Killing ==
On the evening of February 6, 2021, Jiang left the apartment of his fiancée in the East Rock neighborhood of New Haven. At around 8:30 p.m., Jiang's Toyota Prius was struck from behind by a black SUV, driven by Pan. The collision was not significant and after the SUV backed up, Jiang exited his vehicle to check on the other motorist. When he reached the driver's side, Jiang was shot twice by Pan, who then stepped out and fired six more shots at Jiang, who had collapsed to the ground. Jiang died of multiple gunshots to the face and torso. Emergency responders were unable to revive him. Police first investigated the shooting as a random crime, potentially due to road rage, but later suspected a possible personal motive.

Approximately 30 minutes after the murder, Pan drove into a scrap yard with his car and after being pursued by the facility's security guard, he became stuck on nearby railroad tracks due to a flat tire. Accidental trespassing by motorists was not uncommon since the open property was near the highway and as local officers were unaware of the murder, they did not detain him and arranged for towing assistance. Pan was driven to a Best Western hotel in North Haven, Connecticut, by police, after which he dumped a handgun and ten boxes of ammo in plastic bags outside of an adjacent Arby's restaurant. The items were reported the following day and quickly linked to Pan, but a search of the hotel found that Pan had left without using the room he paid for. Pan was named as a suspect on February 10 and a warrant was issued for his arrest on February 26. New Haven Police considered Pan to be "armed and dangerous." A reward of $5,000 for information that would contribute to Pan's arrest was issued by the U.S. Marshals Service, later increased to $10,000 on March 1.

=== Investigation ===
Pan was further tied to Jiang's murder by DNA on the ammo boxes and gun case, blood on clothes found inside the SUV and the vehicle's interior, as well as a partial imprint of a license plate, later found to have been stolen from another car, where Pan's car had bumped Jiang's vehicle. Forensic analysis showed that the pistol found along with the ammunition, a Ruger SR1911, was not the murder weapon, which remains lost. No relationship was established between Jiang and Pan. Jiang's fiancée told investigators that she had befriended Pan at the Massachusetts Institute of Technology and suspected that Pan may have been "interested" in her, but that they never had a romantic relationship.

=== Manhunt ===
A few days after the murder, Pan phoned his parents and asked them to meet him in Connecticut, instructing them to bring money in cash. On February 11, Pan subsequently drove their car to Atlanta, where he abruptly stopped near a highway and walked off. Both parents were questioned and denied knowing about Pan's involvement in a murder, but Pan's mother stated that she believed that her son had killed himself after leaving them. However, federal authorities monitored their bank accounts and took note of numerous withdrawals in the following months, totalling to over $10,000. On April 8, 2021, Interpol issued a Red Notice requesting Pan's arrest and detention in reference to murder and larceny charges. Pan's parents were monitored and recorded traveling to Connecticut and Georgia during spring 2021, with surveillance video at an electronics store in Marietta, Georgia, capturing footage of them along with an individual resembling Pan.

On May 14, 2021, Pan was apprehended in Montgomery, Alabama, where he was living at a boarding house under the false name "Henry Choi". He was in possession of $19,000 cash, his father's passport, and seven cell phones. His bail was set at $20 million, as he was seen as a flight risk for his ties to China. His defense unsuccessfully argued for a lower bond, stating that the passport in Pan's possession was marked as void, that he had no relatives in Shanghai, and that neither he or his parents had contact with anyone in China since the mid-2010s. Pan's parents were again investigated, but not charged.

== Victim ==
Kevin Jiang
- Traditional Chinese: 蔣凱文
- Simplified Chinese: 蒋凯文
Transcriptions
Standard Mandarin
- Hanyu Pinyin: Jiǎng Kǎiwén

Kevin Jiang (Chinese: 蒋凯文) was born in Iowa City, Iowa, on February 14, 1994, to Zhen "Linda" Liu and Mingchen Jiang, both originally from China. The family is Baptist and were part of the Chinese bible churches in Oak Park, Illinois. After his parents divorced, Jiang was raised by his mother in Chicago and became involved in church work after being bullied at school. He attended North Seattle College and the University of Washington, where he graduated magna cum laude in 2016. Jiang served in the US Army National Guard as an environmental scientist, tank operator, and engineering officer, attaining the rank of Second Lieutenant. Since 2019, he was pursuing a master's degree in environmental science at Yale, where he volunteered at a homeless shelter and the Trinity Baptist Church. Jiang was due to graduate in mid-2021. On January 30, 2021, he became engaged to Zion Perry, a fellow Yale graduate student.

== Perpetrator ==
Qinxuan Pan
- Traditional Chinese: 潘勤軒
- Simplified Chinese: 潘勤轩
Transcriptions
Standard Mandarin
- Hanyu Pinyin: Pān Qínxuān

Qinxuan Pan (Chinese: 潘勤轩) was born in Shanghai on April 16, 1991, to Hong Huang and Hao Pan. He immigrated to the United States as a child, and was raised in Malden, Massachusetts. He holds U.S. citizenship. He attended Thomas S. Wootton High School and in 2009, he represented the USA in the International Mathematical Olympiad in Bremen, Germany, where he won a silver medal. Pan graduated from Massachusetts Institute of Technology in 2013 with a bachelor's degree in computer science. He was a PhD candidate in computer science at MIT, advised by Nevanlinna Prize winner Constantinos Daskalakis. At the time of the murder, Pan was employed at MIT Computer Science and Artificial Intelligence Laboratory. He was described as "genius", but socially withdrawn.

Pan was later connected to a series of drive-by shootings in the same area between December 11, 2020 and February 6, 2021. Four homes were shot at, but no one was injured. At every scene, one to five .45 calibre casings were recovered. The final shooting had occurred an hour before Jiang's murder. In both the non-fatal shootings and Jiang's murder, Pan had used a 2013 GMC Terrain from a car dealership in Mansfield, Massachusetts, having taken it out for test drives each time and not returned it after the killing. Investigators stated that the drive-bys were meant to mislead police into believing that Jiang's murder was a random act of violence.

== Trial and sentencing ==
The U.S. Marshals Service charged him with unlawful flight to avoid prosecution and interstate theft of a vehicle. The trial was delayed to April 2022 due to the COVID-19 pandemic.

On December 9, 2022, Pan pled not guilty after Judge Jon Alander determined there was probable cause for the charges filed against him.

On February 27, 2024, Pan pled guilty to the charges, and, as a part of his plea deal, faced up to 35 years in prison without the possibility of probation or parole. The prosecution did not disclose Pan's motive. On April 23, 2024, Judge Gerald Harmon sentenced Pan to 35 years in prison.
