= Bury Me Deep =

2009 mystery novel by Megan Abbott

- Author: Megan Abbott
- Language: English
- Genre: Crime fiction
- Publisher: Simon & Schuster
- Publication date: July 7, 2009
- Media type: Print (paperback and hardback)
- Pages: 240
- ISBN: 9781416599098

Bury Me Deep is a 2009 mystery novel written by Megan Abbott and published by Simon & Schuster.

The book is "a cunningly fictionalized" version of a 1931 crime story in which Winnie Ruth Judd was convicted of the murder of two women in Los Angeles. The Denver Post notes, "Much of the narrative sticks closely to the facts of the case, but the author imagines a vastly different ending, just as plausible but certainly more satisfying than the actual one."

== Reception ==
Bury Me Deep was generally well-received by critics, including a starred review from Kirkus Reviews, who noted, "Abbott takes readers on a wild thrill ride with an utterly believable and strangely sympathetic heroine."

Publishers Weekly called the novel "well-crafted" but warned, "Readers should be prepared for a lot of backstory before the pace picks up and hurtles to a shocking ending."

Awards for Bury Me Deep
Year	Award	Result	Ref.
2009	Hammett Prize	Finalist	
2010	Anthony Award for Best Paperback	Finalist	
2010	Barry Award for Best Paperback Original	Finalist	
2010	Edgar Award for Best Paperback Original	Finalist	
2010	Macavity Award for Best Novel	Finalist	
