= The Fever (novel) =

2014 novel by Megan Abbott

- 1st edition
- Author: Megan Abbott
- Language: English
- Genre: Crime fiction; bildungsromans
- Publisher: Little, Brown and Company
- Publication date: June 17, 2014
- Publication place: United States
- Media type: Print (paperback and hardback)
- Pages: 307
- ISBN: 9780316231053; 1st ed hardcover
- OCLC: 860757048
- Dewey Decimal: 813/.6
- LC Class: PS3601.B37 F48 2014

The Fever is a novel by American writer Megan Abbott first published in 2014 by Little, Brown and Company. It is Abbott's seventh novel.

== Plot ==
Deenie Nash is a diligent student with a close-knit family: her brother, Eli, is a hockey star and her father is a popular teacher. But when Deenie's best friend is struck by a terrifying, unexplained seizure in the middle of class, the Nash family's seeming stability dissolves into chaos.

Soon more local girls start to experience bizarre symptoms, leaving health officials puzzled and parents in an uproar. As hysteria and contagion swell, a series of tightly held secrets emerges, threatening to unravel friendships, families, and the town's fragile idea of security.

== Background and publication ==
The author Megan Abbott was inspired by the news reporting on the 2012 mass hysteria case in Le Roy, New York. It was published by Little, Brown.

== Reception ==
The Fever was generally well received by critics, including starred reviews from Booklist, Kirkus Reviews, and Library Journal. It was listed as one of the best books of 2014 by the Los Angeles Review of Books, Grantland, The Boston Globe, The Globe and Mail, the Sun Sentinel, Parade, School Library Journal, and NPR.

Booklist called the book "a powerful portrait of community, with interesting echoes of The Crucible." Kirkus wrote, "Nothing should be taken at face value in this jealousy- and hormone-soaked world except that Abbott is certainly our very best guide." Library Journal said The Fever was Abbott's best novel to date.

The New York Times described Abbott as "a skilled storyteller," and The Fever as "a gripping and unsettling novel."

Publishers Weekly wrote, "Abbott’s adolescents are close to pitch-perfect with their sudden switches between childlike vulnerability and calculating maturity," though mentioned "the narrative lacks in depth." Ultimately, they called the novel "a gripping story fueled by the razor-sharp treachery, jealousy, hormones, and insecurities of teenage girls."

Entertainment Weekly gave the book a B+ grade.

=== Awards ===
	Year	Award	Result	Ref.
2014	Strand Critics Award for Best Novel	Won		
2015	ITW Thriller Award for Best Hard Cover Novel	Won		
2015	Folio Prize	Nominated		

== External ==
- The Fever on Goodreads
- The Fever at the Library of Congress
