= You Will Know Me =

Novel by Megan Abbott

- Author: Megan Abbott
- Language: English
- Genre: Mystery fiction
- Publisher: Little, Brown and Company
- Publication date: July 26, 2016
- Publication place: USA
- Pages: 352
- ISBN: 9780316231077

You Will Know Me is a 2016 murder mystery by author Megan Abbott, published by Little, Brown and Company. The book follows the Knox family after a family friend is killed in a hit-and-run car crash before the daughter's gymnastics competition.

== Plot ==
At the beginning of You Will Know Me, a young man who is a family friend to the protagonist is killed in a hit-and-run car crash shortly before a gymnastics competition. The narrative follows Devon Knox, a hopeful Olympian gymnast, and her parents, Katie and Eric Knox, who have imposed excessive burdens on themselves, emotionally and financially, to support their 15-year-old daughter. The story is told according to Katie's point of view and showcases the family unraveling as Eric is suspected to be tied to the young man's death.

== Background and publication ==
Abbott was inspired to write You Will Know Me because she was curious how having a prodigy child would affect a family and its dynamics. While researching for the novel, she read Andrew Solomon's book Far From the Tree: Parents, Children and the Search for Identity, about families whose children are disabled, transgender or prodigies and the complex effect this can have on the whole family. The decision to focus on the family of a young gymnast came from viewing viral footage of the American gymnast Aly Raisman's parents watching her during the Olympic qualifiers and how invested they were in her performance, as well as Teri Shields, the mother of the actress Brooke Shields, who was considered "the stage mom". The inspiration for Devon's injury as a child came from the American ice skater Elaine Zayak and her parents' decision to encourage her to become a skater after her disability as a child.

Abbott researched by reading memoirs by gymnasts and their parents and speaking to former gymnasts. To capture the feeling of a teenage girl, she used social media platforms such as Instagram and Tumblr, and listened to music including Hull, Sleater-Kinney and the Savages. The story was compared to the assault of Nancy Kerrigan and the film The Omen.

The novel was published on July 26, 2016, by Little, Brown and Company. It was promoted with a six-city tour and promotion at the annual American Library Association conference. The audiobook was narrated by Lauren Fortgang and released by Hachette Audio and Blackstone Audio.

== Themes ==
There is an element of Greek tragedy in the narrative, exemplified by Drew developing scarlet fever and Katie's worry that she is living in a "sick house". The tension within the family is amplified by the other gymnasts, coaches and parents at BelStars, who become more ominous as the story unfolds. Desire appears as a theme throughout You Will Know Me and Abbott's other novels.

Abbott often writes about teenage girls, as it is an age that she describes as "the most thrilling and most awful period in one's life". In an interview with the Los Angeles Review of Books, she explained that she found it to be an age when girls spent a lot of time thinking about themselves. There is a focus throughout the novel on the female body and the way that young gymnasts bodies are controlled and analyzed, a dynamic that Abbott described as "In some ways [...] every nightmare of adolescence and in some ways it strips adolescence from the equation". This is a theme that has often appeared in Abbott's novels as puberty symbolizes teenagers' distance from their parents.

== Reception ==
You Will Know Me was well-received by critics, including starred reviews from Booklist, Kirkus Reviews, and Library Journal. Booklist called the novel a "dazzling tale" that "explor[es] the agony and urgency of their desire, the unknowability of others, and the burden of expectations laid on the gymnasts. It’s vivid, troubling, and powerful—and Abbott totally sticks the landing." Library Journal highlighted Abbott's strength for creating unpredictable plotlines, noting that "the plot consistently confounds expectations with its clever twists and turns." Kirkus Reviews wrote, "Abbott proves herself a master of fingernails-digging-into-your-palms suspense."

Pittsburgh Post-Gazette echoed Kirkus's review, writing, "Rather than curve balls in the plot, it’s the chilling emotional twists that make the story so intriguing." The New York Times continued Abbot's praise for plot and suspense, saying she"is in top form in this novel. She resumes her customary role of black cat, opaque and unblinking, filling her readers with queasy suspicion at every turn."

Multiple reviews also highlighted a common theme in Abbott's novels: psychosocial relations. NPR's Maureen Corrigan called the book "a masterful thriller that also offers an eerily precise portrait of the way teenage and parental cliques operate." Shelf Awareness continued, "Abbott is working at the top of her craft, and You Will Know Me is a crime novel where the crime is only a catalyst for an accomplished exploration of ordinary people's unraveling when they become obsessed with the extraordinary among them."

Publishers Weekly focused their review primarily on the book's characters: "Eric usually sounds uptight and anxious, and when he and Katie are alone, a little furtive. Devon is brimming with entitlement, impatience, and intolerance. Her fellow gymnasts are humorless, snarky, soft-spoken or arrogant. All are almost as driven as their parents, for whom Olympic excellence is all that matters in their lives."

In reviews, Abbott's writing skill in You Will Know Me was likened to literary giants Richard Yates, John Cheever, and Stephen King.

=== Awards ===
	Year	Award		Result	Ref.
2016	Booklist's Best Sports Fiction	—	Top 10		
2017	Anthony Award	Novel	Shortlisted		
2017	ITW Thriller Award	Novel	Shortlisted		
2017	Macavity Awards	Mystery Novel	Shortlisted		
2017	Steel Dagger	—	Shortlisted		
