= Megan Abbott =

American writer (born 1971)

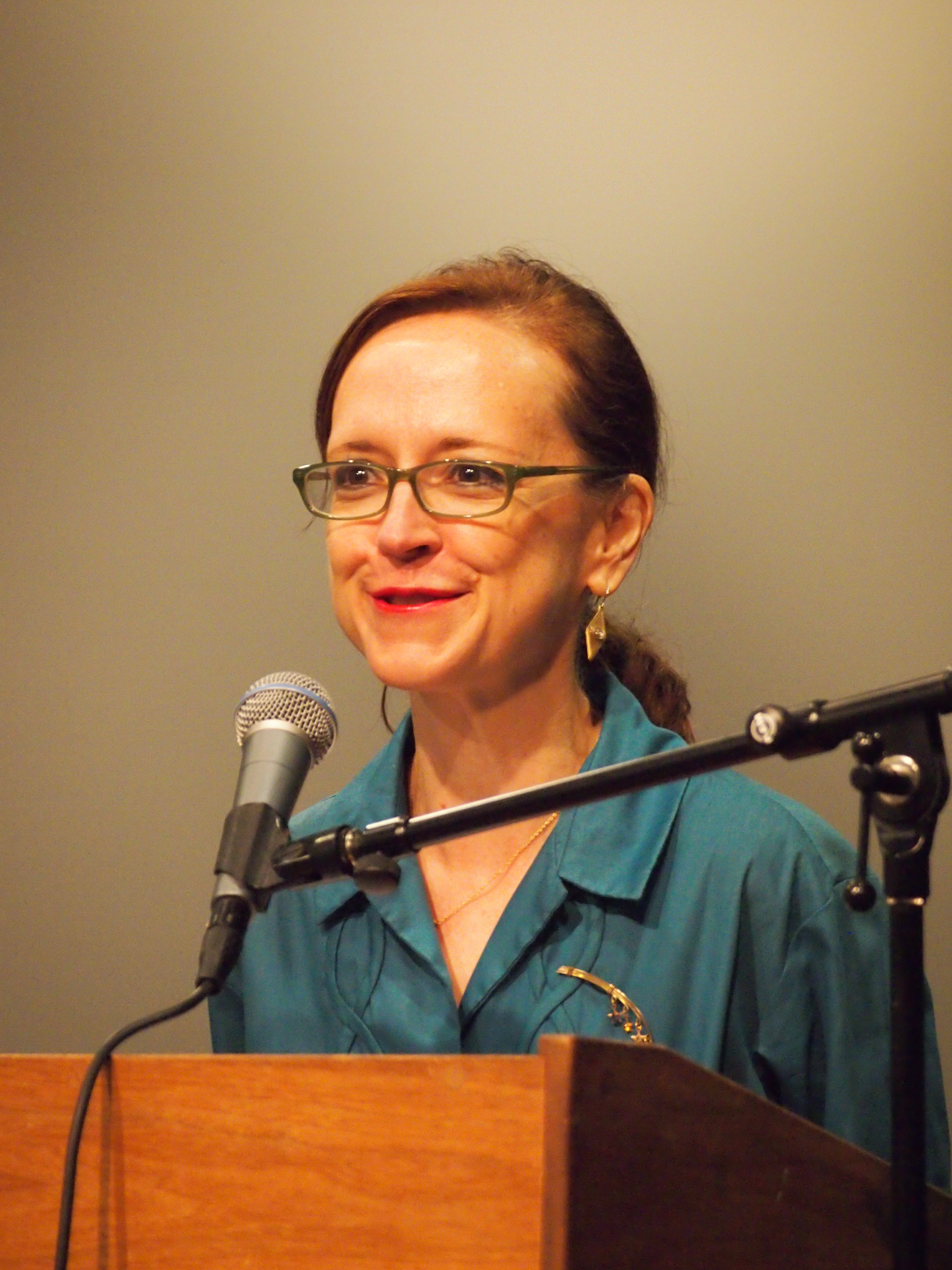
- Abbott in 2015
- Born: August 21, 1971 (age 55); Detroit, Michigan, U.S.
- Education: University of Michigan (BA); New York University (PhD)
- Occupations: Author, screenwriter, journalist
- Relatives: Philip Abbott (father)
- Writing career
- Language: English
- Genre: Crime fiction
- Notable awards: Edgar Award (2008); Barry Award (2008); Los Angeles Times Book Prize (2021 & 2025)
- Website: www.meganabbott.com

Megan Abbott (born August 21, 1971) is an American screenwriter and author of crime fiction and non-fiction analyses of hardboiled crime fiction. Her novels and short stories have drawn from and reworked classic subgenres of crime writing from a female perspective.

== Early life and education ==
Abbott grew up in the Detroit suburb of Grosse Pointe. She graduated with her bachelor's degree from the University of Michigan. She received her Ph.D. in English and American literature from New York University.

== Career ==
Abbott has taught at NYU, the State University of New York and New School University. In 2013 and 2014, she served as the John Grisham Writer in Residence at the University of Mississippi.

In 2002, Abbott published her first book, The Street Was Mine: White Masculinity in Hardboiled Fiction and Film Noir. In it, Abbott challenges the archetypes of the "tough guy" and "femme fatale" common to noir literature.

Three years later, Abbott published Die a Little, the first of several novels presenting woman-centered takes on traditional noir tropes. Set in midcentury Los Angeles, the story centered on Lora King, a schoolteacher whose brother Bill falls in love with Alice Steele, a former costumer for the film industry. Suspicious of Alice's motives and jealous of her hold over Bill, Lora sets out to investigate Alice's background, only to find herself pulled into the dark side of Hollywood.

In addition to literature, Abbott has written for major journals and newspapers, including the Los Angeles Times. She also writes a blog with novelist Sara Gran.

== Television work ==
Abbott was a screenwriter for The Deuce, an HBO show that premiered in 2017 and deals with pornography and the Mafia in New York in the 1970s and beyond. In 2019, she adapted her bestselling novel Dare Me into a TV series on USA Network. She served as co-showrunner on the series, along with Gina Fattore.

== Influences ==
Abbott was influenced by film noir, classic noir fiction, and Jeffrey Eugenides's novel The Virgin Suicides. Two of her novels refer to notorious crimes. The Song Is You (2007) is based around the disappearance of Jean Spangler in 1949, and Bury Me Deep (2009) on the 1931 case of Winnie Ruth Judd, dubbed "the Trunk Murderess".

== Reception and awards ==
Abbott has won the Mystery Writers of America's Edgar Award for outstanding fiction. Time named her one of the "23 Authors That We Admire" in 2011. Publishers Weekly gave her 2011 novel The End of Everything a starred review.

=== Awards ===
| Year | Title | Award | Result | Ref. |
|---|---|---|---|---|
| 2006 | Die a Little | Anthony Award for Best Novel | Finalist | |
| 2006 | Die a Little | Barry Award for Best First Novel | Finalist | |
| 2006 | Die a Little | Edgar Award for Best First Novel | Finalist | |
| 2008 | Queenpin | Anthony Award for Best Paperback | Finalist | |
| 2008 | Queenpin | Barry Award for Best Paperback Original | Won | |
| 2008 | Queenpin | Edgar Award for Best Paperback Original | Won | |
| 2009 | Bury Me Deep | Hammett Prize | Finalist | |
| 2010 | Bury Me Deep | Anthony Award for Best Paperback | Finalist | |
| 2010 | Bury Me Deep | Barry Award for Best Paperback Original | Finalist | |
| 2010 | Bury Me Deep | Edgar Award for Best Paperback Original | Finalist | |
| 2010 | Bury Me Deep | Macavity Award for Best Novel | Finalist | |
| 2012 | The End of Everything | Anthony Award for Best Mystery | Finalist | |
| 2012 | Dare Me | Steel Dagger Award | Finalist | |
| 2013 | Dare Me | Anthony Award for Best Mystery | Finalist | |
| 2014 | The Fever | Strand Critics Award for Best Novel | Won | |
| 2015 | The Fever | ITW Thriller Award for Novel | Won | |
| 2016 | "Little Men" | Anthony Award for Best Short Story | Won | |
| 2017 | You Will Know Me | Anthony Award for Best Mystery | Finalist | |
| 2017 | You Will Know Me | ITW Thriller Award for Best Novel | Finalist | |
| 2017 | You Will Know Me | Macavity Awards | Finalist | |
| 2017 | You Will Know Me | Steel Dagger Award | Finalist | |
| 2018 | Give Me Your Hand | Los Angeles Times Book Prize for Mystery/Thriller | Nominated | |
| 2019 | Give Me Your Hand | Anthony Award for Best Novel | Finalist | |
| 2019 | Give Me Your Hand | Steel Dagger Award | Finalist | |
| 2021 | The Turnout | Booklist Editors' Choice: Adult Books for Young Adults | Selection | |
| 2021 | The Turnout | Los Angeles Times Book Prize for Mystery/Thriller | Won | |
| 2022 | The Turnout | ITW Thriller Award for Hardcover Novel | Finalist | |
| 2022 | The Turnout | Booklist's Best Mysteries & Thrillers | Top 10 | |
| 2025 | El Dorado Drive | Los Angeles Times Book Prize for Mystery/Thriller | Won | |
| 2025 | El Dorado Drive | Hammett Prize | Finalist | |

== Publications ==
=== As editor ===
- —— (2007). A Hell of a Woman: An Anthology of Female Noir. ISBN 9780979270994.

=== Non-fiction ===
- —— (2002). The Street Was Mine: White Masculinity in Hardboiled Fiction and Film Noir. ISBN 0312294816.

=== Novels ===
- —— (2005). Die a Little. Simon & Schuster. ISBN 9780743261708.
- —— (2007). The Song Is You. Simon & Schuster. ISBN 9780743291712.
- —— (2007). Queenpin. Simon & Schuster. ISBN 9781416534280.
- —— (2009). Bury Me Deep. Simon & Schuster. ISBN 9781416599098.
- —— (2011). The End of Everything. Little, Brown and Company. ISBN 9780316097796.
- —— (2012). Dare Me. Little, Brown and Company. ISBN 9780316097772.
- —— (2014). The Fever. Little, Brown and Company. ISBN 9780316231053.
- —— (2016). You Will Know Me. Little, Brown and Company. ISBN 9780316231077.
- —— (2018). Give Me Your Hand. Pan Macmillan. ISBN 9781509855681.
- —— (2021). The Turnout. G. P. Putnam's Sons. ISBN 9780593084908.
- —— (2023). Beware the Woman. G. P. Putnam's Sons. ISBN 9780593084939.
- —— (2025). El Dorado Drive. G. P. Putnam's Sons. ISBN 9780593084977.

=== Short stories ===
- "Oxford Girl" (2016). Appeared in Mississippi Noir.
- "Girlie Show" (2016). Appeared in In Sunlight or in Shadow: Stories Inspired by the Paintings of Edward Hopper.
- "Little Men" (2015). Appeared in The Best American Mystery Stories 2016.
- "My Heart Is Either Broken" (2013). Appeared in Dangerous Women.

== Filmography ==
=== Television ===
| Year | Title | Writer | Producer | Notes |
|---|---|---|---|---|
| 2017-18 | The Deuce | Yes | No | also story editor |
| 2019 | Dare Me | Yes | Yes | also executive producer |
| TBA | The Turnout | No | Yes | |
