= Dare Me (novel) =

2012 mystery novel written by Megan Abbott

- First edition (US)
- Author: Megan Abbot
- Language: English
- Genre: Mystery
- Published: 2012
- Publisher: Reagan Arthur Books
- ISBN: 0316250546

Dare Me is a 2012 mystery novel written by Megan Abbott. The novel centers on American cheerleading. The book explores themes of friendship, obsession and power.

== Plot ==
The story is based on the world of American cheerleading. The main characters are Addy, the 16-year-old narrator, her friend Beth and the cheerleading coach.

The friendship between Addy and Beth goes back to their childhood. Beth is manipulative and often cruel; she has always been the leader with Addy her faithful lieutenant. A new coach arrives, things change very quickly and very soon she and Beth engage in a battle of wills. Addy adores Coach and is always willing to do her bidding, which in turn fuels Beth's jealousy; when the other team members gather at Coach's house for drinking sessions, Beth does not go there, but always watches, waiting for her moment. The girls are pushed to physical and psychological extremes as they vie for the best position on the team. Injury is just one wobble away. Then one dark night Addy is drawn into a nightmare.

== Reception ==
Dare Me received starred reviews from Booklist and Kirkus Reviews. Kirkus called the novel "[c]ompelling, claustrophobic and slightly creepy in a can’t-put-it-down way."

The Independent called the book a "mesmerising piece of prose combining deep characterisation and insight with a truly nerve-shredding crime plot." Publishers Weekly said the it is "deliciously slick and dark, matching her characters’ threatening circumstances, and the plot is tight and intense."

Entertainment Weekly gave the book an A− rating and highlighted that "...it makes a traditionally masculine genre feel distinctly female. It feels groundbreaking when Abbott takes noir conventions — loss of innocence, paranoia, the manipulative sexuality of newly independent women — and suggests that they’re rooted in high school, deep in the hearts of all-American girls."

=== Awards ===
	Year	Author	Result
2012	Steel Dagger	Finalist	
2013	Anthony Award for Best Mystery	Finalist	

== Adaptation ==
In late January 2019, a series based on the novel was ordered by USA Network and Netflix.
