= Barium acetate =

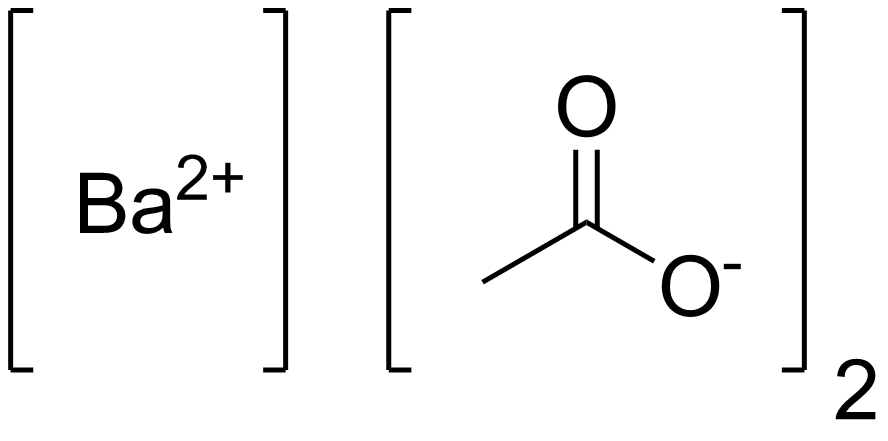

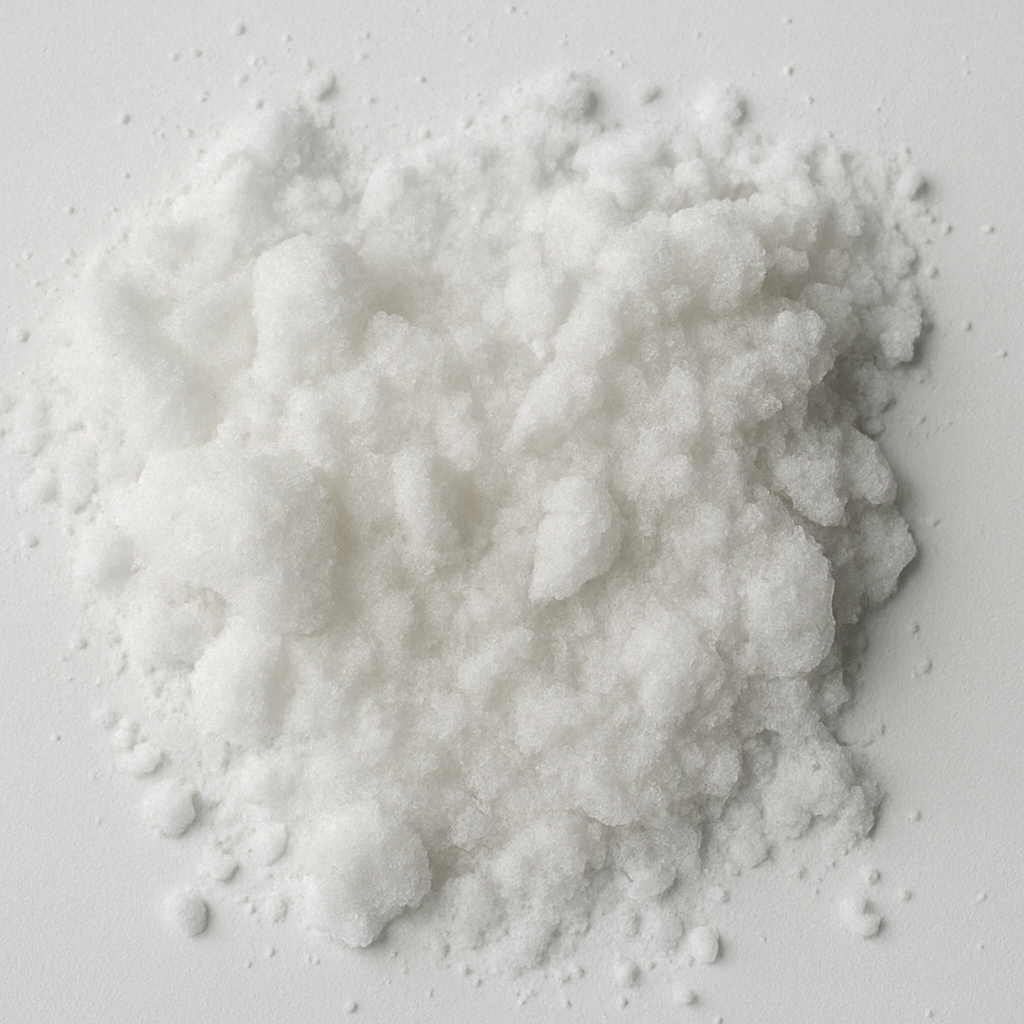
- Powdered Anhydrous Barium Acetate

Names
- IUPAC name Barium acetate
- Other names Barium diacetate

Identifiers
CAS Number	543-80-6
3D model (JSmol)	Interactive image
Abbreviations	Ba(OAc)_{2}
ChEBI	CHEBI:190441
ChemSpider	10515
ECHA InfoCard	100.008.045
EC Number	208-849-0
PubChem CID	10980
RTECS number	AF4550000
UNII	FBA31YJ60R
CompTox Dashboard (EPA)	DTXSID7020130
- InChI: InChI=1S/2C2H4O2.Ba/c21-2(3)4;/h21H3,(H,3,4);/q;;+2/p-2 Key: ITHZDDVSAWDQPZ-UHFFFAOYSA-L; InChI=1/2C2H4O2.Ba/c21-2(3)4;/h21H3,(H,3,4);/q;;+2/p-2 Key: ITHZDDVSAWDQPZ-NUQVWONBAA
- SMILES: [Ba+2].[O-]C(=O)C.[O-]C(=O)C

Properties
Chemical formula	C_{4}H_{6}BaO_{4}
Molar mass	255.415 g·mol^{−1}
Appearance	White solid
Odor	odorless
Density	2.468 g/cm^{3} (anhydrous); 2.19 g/cm^{3} (monohydrate)
Melting point	450 °C (842 °F; 723 K) decomposes
Solubility in water	55.8 g/100 mL (0 °C); 72 g/100mL (20 °C)
Solubility	slightly soluble in ethanol, methanol
Magnetic susceptibility (χ)	−100.1·10^{−6} cm^{3}/mol (·2H_{2}O)

Structure
Crystal structure	tetragonal

Hazards
- Occupational safety and health (OHS/OSH)
Main hazards	Toxic, hazardous on ingestion
NFPA 704 (fire diamond)	3 0 0
- Lethal dose or concentration (LD, LC)
LD_{50} (median dose)	921 mg/kg (oral, rat).
- Except where otherwise noted, data are given for materials in their standard state (at 25 °C [77 °F], 100 kPa). verify (what is ?) Infobox references

Barium acetate is the barium salt of acetic acid, with the chemical formula (CH_{3}COO)_{2}Ba. It is used in chemistry and manufacturing as a soluble source of barium and is toxic to humans.

== Preparation ==
Barium acetate is generally produced by the reaction of acetic acid with barium carbonate:

BaCO_{3} + 2 CH_{3}COOH → (CH_{3}COO)_{2}Ba + CO_{2} + H_{2}O

The reaction is performed in solution and the barium acetate crystalizes out at temperatures above 41 °C. Between 25 and 40 °C, the monohydrate version crystalizes. Alternatively, barium sulfide can be used:

BaS + 2 CH_{3}COOH → (CH_{3}COO)_{2}Ba + H_{2}S

Again, the solvent is evaporated off and the barium acetate crystallized.

== Properties ==
Barium acetate is a white powder, which is highly soluble: at 0 °C, 55.8 g of barium acetate can be dissolved in 100 g of water.

== Reactions ==
Barium acetate can be used in metathesis reactions.

When heated in air, barium acetate decomposes to barium carbonate.

== Uses ==
Barium acetate is used as a mordant for printing textile fabrics, for drying paints and varnishes, and in lubricating oil. In chemistry, it is used in the preparation of other acetates, and as a catalyst in organic synthesis.

== In popular culture ==
Barium acetate was featured in a 2001 episode of the television series Forensic Files as well as a 2014 episode of the crime documentary series Redrum and an episode of Deadly Women.

All of which recount the 1993 murder of a man by his teenaged daughter (Marie Robards). Episodes about the Robards do not name the chemical.
