= Abortion in New York =

2024 New York Proposal 1 results map by county

Abortion in New York is legal via state statute and Article I, Section 11 of the state constitution. Abortions after the 24th week of pregnancy require the approval of a licensed physician. The Reproductive Health Act, passed in 2019 in New York, further allows abortions past the 24th week of pregnancy if a pregnant woman's life or physical or mental health is at risk, or if the fetus is not viable. However, since these exceptions are not defined by the law, and the law carries no criminal penalties for the pregnant individual, abortion is effectively legal throughout pregnancy.

The number of abortion clinics in New York (for which more than half of all patient visits are for abortion) declined from 302 in 1982 to 95 in 2014, but increased to 113 in 2017, according to Guttmacher Institute. The abortion rate decreased from an estimated 39 abortions per 1000 women aged 15–44 in 1992 to 22 per 1000 in 2016, according to the US Centers for Disease Control and Prevention (CDC).

== History ==
Madame Restell opened a business that performed abortions in the 1830s in New York City. Her business remained open for around 35 years, and openly advertised its services in newspapers. She had branches in several other cities, including Boston and Philadelphia, and employed traveling agents working for the company that sold her "Female Monthly Pills". New York state saw many women dying during the 1860s and 1870s due to using unskilled abortion providers. Some of these deaths were highly publicized, which turned the public's attitude against abortions. In 1918, Margaret Sanger was charged under the New York law against disseminating contraceptive information. On appeal, her conviction was reversed because contraceptive devices could legally be promoted to cure and prevent disease.

A group of science, health, and medical experts met in 1955 in New York; their purpose was to discuss abortion in the United States. Their belief was that between 200,000 and 1.2 million illegal abortions took place annually. Planned Parenthood Federation of America had a conference at Arden House in New York in 1955. The conference's purpose was to review the knowledge framework in the United States as it related to abortion. One of the accomplishments of the conference was that it published the "first objective and quantitative estimates of illegal abortions". The conference also provided participants with a first-hand perspective on the state of abortion in the country, from a presentation by a physician who had performed over 5,000 abortions.

In 1955, Sloane Hospital in New York created a hospital review board to approve all abortion requests. Consequently, the number of abortions performed at the hospital in the next five-year period for therapeutic reasons was half what it was prior to 1955. According to Dr. Alan F. Guttmacher of Mount Sinai Hospital in New York, hospital review committees taught doctors to only refer cases they thought would be approved, saying: "Many physicians are discouraged by telephone conversations or corridor consultation with a single Committee member."

At Harlem Hospital, before the legalization of abortion in New York in 1970, there was a positive correlation between neonatal and perinatal mortality and the number of clandestine and non-medical community abortions. In the 1940s and 1950s, abortions would be given to some women on mental health waivers at Mount Sinai if they indicated they had attempted to commit suicide as a result of the pregnancy. At one New York City hospital, in the pre-Roe v. Wade period, a teenage girl asked for an abortion, citing suicide attempts as the reason; the hospital committee initially turned her down and hospitalized her, and the girl continued to try to kill herself. The waiver was finally granted, in order to stop the disruption the girl caused at the hospital.

Because of the nature of their abortion laws, New York City and the District of Columbia became destination centers for women in 1971 who were seeking legal abortions.

Abortion was legalized up to the 24th week of pregnancy in New York in 1970, three years before it was legalized for the entire United States with the Supreme Court's decision in Roe v. Wade in 1973. Roe v. Wade was later overturned in 2022 by the Supreme Court in Dobbs v. Jackson Women's Health Organization.

=== Legislative history ===
The first statute to criminalize abortion in New York State was enacted in 1827. This law made post-quickening abortions a felony, and made pre-quickening abortions a misdemeanor. New York later allowed abortions up to the 24th week of pregnancy. New York was the first state to create a therapeutic exemption that allowed women to have abortions if their life was at risk by continuing the pregnancy. In 1845, New York passed a statute that said women who had abortions could be given a prison sentence of three months to a year. They were one of the few states at the time to have laws punishing women for getting abortions. Susannah Lattin's death led to an investigation that resulted in regulating maternity clinics and adoptions in New York City in 1868. In 1872, New York state made it a penalty to perform an abortion, with a criminal sentence of between 4 and 20 years in prison.

The New York State legislature amended their abortion-related statute in 1965 to allow for more therapeutic exceptions.

On April 10, 1970, the New York Senate passed a law legalizing abortion until the 24th week of pregnancy. Republican Governor Nelson A. Rockefeller signed the bill into law the next day. At the time, New York State was a Republican "trifecta", meaning both chambers of the legislature and the governorship were Republican-controlled. The 1970 law did several things. First, it added a consent provision requiring a physician to obtain the woman's consent before performing an abortion. Second, it permitted physician-provided elective abortion services within the first 24 weeks of pregnancy, or to preserve the woman's life. Third, it permitted a woman, when acting upon the advice of a duly licensed physician, to perform an "abortional act" on herself within the first 24 weeks of pregnancy, or to preserve her life. New York was the second state, after Hawaii, to enact landmark abortion law legislation. Unlike Hawaii, however, New York's abortion law did not have a 90-day residency requirement.

Between 1970 and 1973, the New York General Assembly attempted to repeal their law that made abortion legal. Governor Rockefeller successfully vetoed the repeal attempt.

Cities like Baltimore, Austin, and New York passed legislation to require Crisis Pregnancy Centers (CPCs) to disclose that they did not offer abortion services, but organizations representing the CPCs have been successful in courts challenging these laws, principally on the argument that forcing the CPCs to post such language violated their First Amendment rights, and constituted compelled speech. Whereas the previous attempts at regulating CPCs in Baltimore and other cities were based on having signage that informed the patient that the CPC did not offer abortion-related services, the FACT Act instead makes the patient aware of state-sponsored services that are available, rather than what the CPCs did or did not offer. The law went into effect January 1, 2016. The state legislature was one of five states nationwide that tried, and failed, to pass a "fetal heartbeat" bill in 2014. The terminology of these bills is largely contested, and considered to be inaccurate by medical professionals. This is because at the proposed time (as early as 6 weeks), the conceptus is not yet considered a fetus, and is actually an embryo. Additionally, there is no heart present in the embryo; it would more accurately be called a cluster of cells with electrical activity.

As of May 14, 2019, the state prohibited abortions after the fetus was viable, generally some point between week 24 and 28. This period uses a standard defined by the US Supreme Court in 1973, with the Roe v. Wade ruling. In 2019, New York passed the Reproductive Health Act (RHA), which repealed a pre-Roe provision that banned third-trimester abortions, except in cases where the continuation of the pregnancy endangered a pregnant woman's life. The law said: "The legislature finds that comprehensive reproductive health care, including contraception and abortion, is a fundamental component of a woman's health, privacy, and equality." The bill also allowed qualified health practitioners to perform abortions, not just licensed medical doctors.

In November 2024, New York voters passed a referendum to amend the state constitution to protect the right to abortion. and will take effect on January 1, 2025.

=== Judicial history ===
The US Supreme Court's decision in 1973's Roe v. Wade ruling meant the state could no longer regulate abortion in the first trimester. However, the Supreme Court overturned Roe v. Wade in Dobbs v. Jackson Women's Health Organization, No. 19-1392, 597 U.S. ___ (2022) later in 2022. Schenck v. Pro-Choice Network of Western New York was before the US Supreme Court in 1997. Two abortion clinics in western New York had obtained injunctions to prevent anti-abortion rights protesters from blockading their facilities, or engaging in other types of disruptive protests. The Court ruled in a 6–3 decision that "floating buffer zones" preventing protesters approaching people entering or leaving abortion clinics were unconstitutional, though "fixed buffer zones" around the clinics themselves remained constitutional. The Court's upholding the fixed buffer was the most important aspect of the ruling, because it was a common feature of injunctions nationwide.

=== Clinic history ===
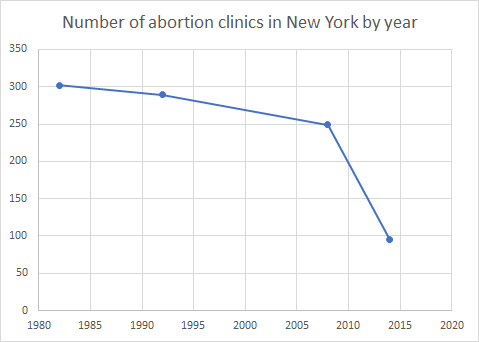
Number of abortion clinics in New York by year

In the 1940s, police would raid suspected illegal abortion clinics. Between 1982 and 1992, the number of abortion clinics in the state decreased by thirteen, going from 302 in 1982 to 289 in 1992. The number of abortion providers in New York was 266 in 1996. In the period between 1992 and 1996, the state ranked third in the loss of number of abortion clinics, losing 23 to have a total of 266 in 1996. In 2008, the states with the most providers were California with 522 and New York with 249. In 2014, there were 95 abortion clinics in New York, and 44% of the counties in the state did not have an abortion clinic. That year, 10% of women in the state aged 15–44 lived in a county without an abortion clinic. In 2017, there were 58 Planned Parenthood clinics, of which 49 offered abortion services, in a state with a population of 4,718,933 women aged 15–49.

A study was done involving 300 women approached by anti-abortion protesters at an abortion clinic in Buffalo, New York. It found that while some women were upset by the protesters, none of the 300 women changed their minds as a result of protester's actions in relation to their decision to get an abortion.

== Statistics ==
In 1972, an estimated 100,000 women traveled to New York to have legal abortions. Over half of them traveled more than 500 miles to get a legal abortion in the state. In 1990, 2,443,000 women in the state had a reported unintended pregnancy. The highest number of legal induced abortions by the state in 2000 occurred in New York (94,466), while Florida was second (88,563), and Texas was third (76,121). In 2001, New York had the highest number of induced abortions (91,792), while Idaho had the lowest induced abortion to live birth ratio, at 36 per 1,000 live births. In 2010, the state of New York had 45,722 publicly funded abortions, of which none were federally funded and all were state-funded.

State abortion estimates differ depending on the data source (US Centers for Disease Control and Prevention (CDC) versus the Guttmacher Institute). According to Guttmacher Institute, there were 105,380 abortions in 2017, 110,840 in 2016, and 119,940 in 2014. According to the CDC, there were 87,325 abortions in NY in 2016, 93.096 in 2015, and 96,711 in 2014.

In 2012, New York City reported abortions (31,328) outnumbered live births (24,758) for black children. Black and Hispanic abortions combined (54,245) account for 73% of the total abortions in the city in 2012, according to a report by the New York City Department of Health and Mental Hygiene, Office of Vital Statistics. In 2013, among white women aged 15–19, there were 2,660 abortions, 5,860 abortions for black women aged 15–19, 4,670 abortions for Hispanic women aged 15–19, and 760 abortions for women of all other races.

Number of reported abortions, abortion rate, and percentage change in rate by geographic region and state in 1992, 1995, and 1996
Census division and state	Number			Rate			% change 1992–1996
Census division and state	1992	1995	1996	1992	1995	1996	% change 1992–1996
Middle Atlantic	300,450	278,310	270,220	34.6	32.7	32	–8
New Jersey	55,320	61,130	63,100	31	34.5	35.8	16
New York	195,390	176,420	167,600	46.2	42.8	41.1	–11
Pennsylvania	49,740	40,760	39,520	18.6	15.5	15.2	–18

Number, rate, and ratio of reported abortions, by reporting area of residence and occurrence and by percentage of abortions obtained by out-of-state residents, US CDC estimates
Location	Year	Residence			Occurrence			% obtained by out-of-state residents	Ref
Location	Year	No.	Rate^	Ratio^^	No.	Rate^	Ratio^^	% obtained by out-of-state residents	Ref
New York	1992	--	--	--	164,274	39	582	3.2	
New York City	1992	--	--	--	114,700	--	909	2.8	
New York State	1992	--	--	--	49,574	--	318	4.1	
New York	1995	--	--	--	139,686	34	525	--	
New York CIty	1995	--	--	--	95,205	--	785	4.8	
New York State	1995	--	--	--	44,481	--	307	5.1	
New York	1996	--	--	--	152,991	37	580	--	
New York City	1996	--	--	--	109,331	--	889	6.1	
New York State	1996	--	--	--	43,660	--	310	4.9	
New York	2014	93,984	23.2	264	96,711	23.9	271	3.3	
New York City	2014	--	--	--	67,620	34.8	575	7.9	
New York State	2014	--	--	--	29,091	13.8	122	5.2	
New York	2015	88,762	22	374	93,096	23.1	392	5.1	
New York City	2015	--	--	--	63,646	32.8	544	--	
New York State	2015	--	--	--	29,450	14.1	245	--	
New York	2016	82,841	20.7	354	87,325	21.8	373	5.6	
New York City	2016	--	--	--	59,854	31.1	519	--	
New York State	2016	--	--	--	27,471	13.2	213	--	
^number of abortions per 1,000 women aged 15–44; ^^number of abortions per 1,000 live births

== Abortion financing ==
Seventeen states, including New York, use their own funds to cover all or most "medically necessary" abortions sought by low-income women under Medicaid, thirteen of which are required by state court orders to do so.

== Women's abortion experiences ==
In the 1920s, women in the New York City metro area would sometimes try to induce abortions using botulism. In some cases, doctors would refuse to treat women who were suspected of attempting abortions. Mary Parker of Brooklyn died after her illegal abortion in 1929, and left behind three children. Her cause of death was listed as gangrene, not botulism poisoning.

Around 1947, a young nurse and her boyfriend with some medical training borrowed an apartment in New York City from friends. While the friends were gone, the boyfriend performed an illegal abortion on his girlfriend, leaving blood on the floor and kitchen table.

During the 1940s and 1950s, nurses attended to women in Bellevue Hospital who were admitted after botched abortions. These dying women often gave evidence to the police about the procedures in order to prosecute people performing illegal abortions. A few women withheld the names of the abortion providers.

In the 1960s, a woman named Mason attending Ohio State visited a Planned Parenthood clinic to seek information on getting an abortion. At the time, the Ohio-based clinic was providing information on birth control and offering reproductive health care. They referred her to a clinic in New York City, who told her that the procedure would cost around US$150. With help from her boyfriend and her best friend, she worked covertly to raise the money for the procedure; she stole glass bottles from a neighbor, so she could turn them in for US$0.05 a piece to fund her abortion. Her friend also collected glass bottles from her own mother to raise money for the abortion. Mason and her boyfriend then drove through the night to Manhattan. She attributes her ability to obtain an abortion to geography.

Then 18-year-old Connecticut resident Vikki Wachtel traveled to New York City to obtain an abortion at Bellevue Hospital in October 1970, where she had post-abortion complications. Her abortion took place 5 months after New York State legalized the procedure. She said that bans would make abortions more dangerous.

Christine Marinoni had an abortion in 2010. She made the decision with her wife, Cynthia Nixon, after doctors told the couple that the fetus Marinoni was carrying was not viable.

== Illegal abortion injuries and deaths ==
In 1962, around 1,200 women were admitted to hospitals in New York City's Harlem Hospital as a result of incomplete attempted abortions. In the period between 1972 and 1974, Texas and New York State had the largest number of illegal abortion deaths. Texas recorded 14 in this period, while New York had 11 in a period where 63 deaths from illegal abortions were reported nationwide. In 1972, New York had 10 illegal abortion deaths. In 1973, it had 1. In 1974, the state recorded no illegal abortion deaths. The deaths in the District of Columbia and New York in this period demonstrated that even where abortion is legal, women face circumstances that drive them to have irregular, non-physician-assisted abortions. There are a variety of factors for this, including lack of education, poverty, and distrust of the medical establishment.

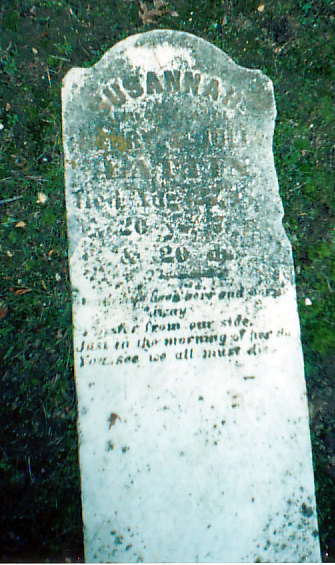
Fallen gravestone of Susannah Lattin (1848–1868) in Powell Cemetery in 2002. Farmingdale, New York.

Susannah Lattin was an American woman who died of a postpartum infection at an illegal maternity clinic at 6 Amity Place in New York City, operated by Henry Dyer Grindle. Lattin became pregnant by George C. Houghton, a clerk at Whitehouse's boot and shoe store on Fulton Street, Brooklyn. Houghton paid $50 to Dr J.C. Harrison to perform an abortion, but Lattin did not go through with it. She was still hoping that Houghton would marry her. Houghton then quit his job and moved to Philadelphia to escape the situation. Lattin next went to her cousin, George H. Powell, who worked as a butcher at the Washington Market. Powell pretended to be her husband and arranged for her, as "Mrs Smith", to see Dr Henry D. Grindle, who ran an unauthorized "lying-in" hospital that allowed the pregnant woman to have their children and have them illegally adopted. The doctor wanted her to pay $150, but she could only pay $100 and he accepted it. Lattin checked into the lying-in hospital on August 5, 1868; then, a few weeks later, she delivered a healthy baby boy who was adopted anonymously, without any record kept of the adoptive parents. Around August 18, 1868, she developed a postpartum infection. The medical student who attended to her realized Lattin was in serious condition and was not likely to survive, and he persuaded her to tell him her real name, so he could notify her family. The message got to her parents after she had died. Coroner Aaron B. Rollins investigated the death.

== Intersections with religion and religious figures ==
In 1990, John O'Connor, archbishop of New York, suggested that, by supporting abortion rights, Catholic politicians risked excommunication. Congresswoman Nancy Pelosi said that, "There is no desire to fight with the cardinals or archbishops. But it has to be clear that we are elected officials, and we uphold the law, and we support public positions separate, and apart, from our Catholic faith."

== Abortion rights activities ==
=== Activities ===
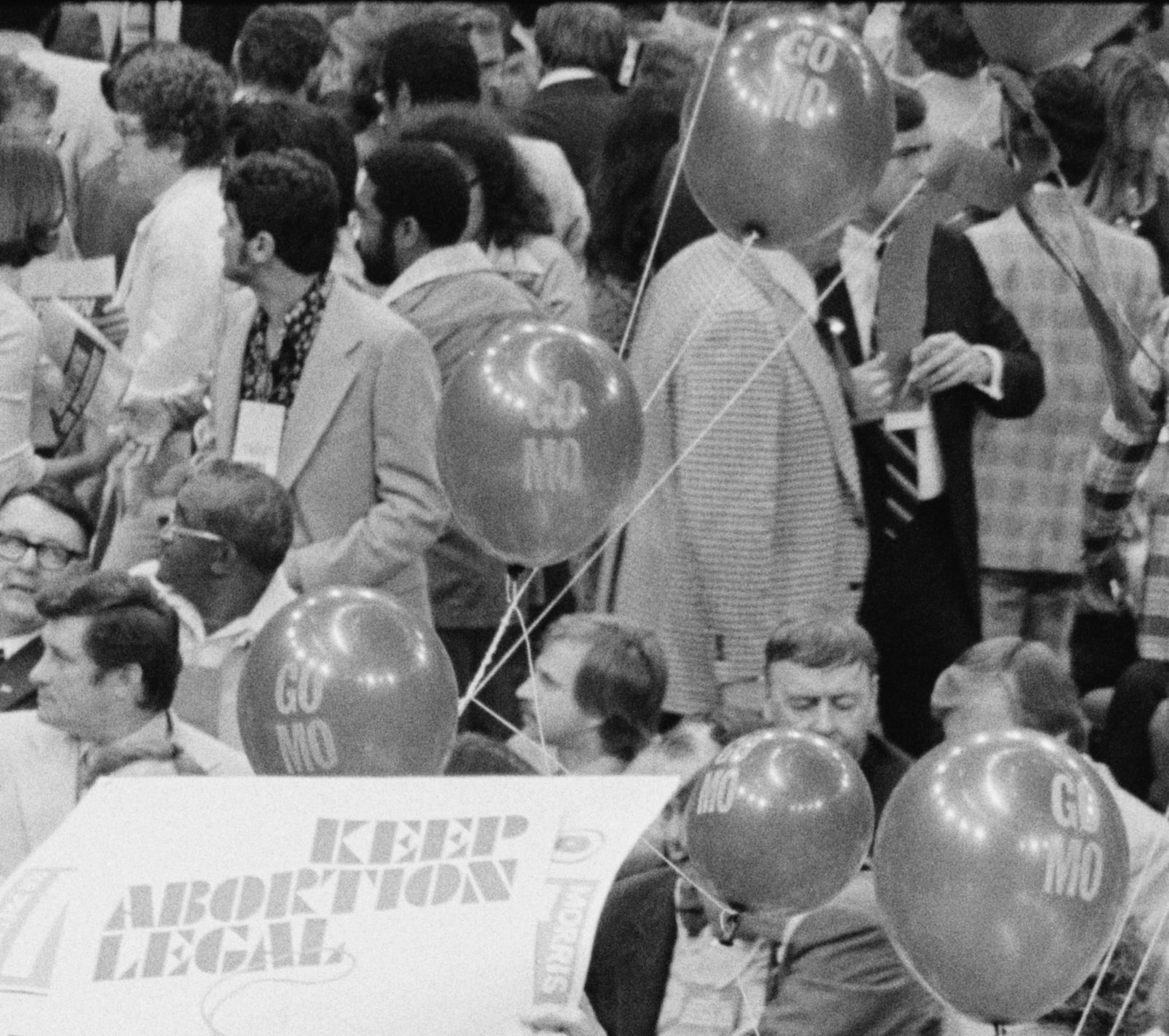
"Go Mo" (Morris Udall) balloons and a Keep Abortion Legal sign (with a Morris Udall sign behind it) at the 1976 Democratic National Convention

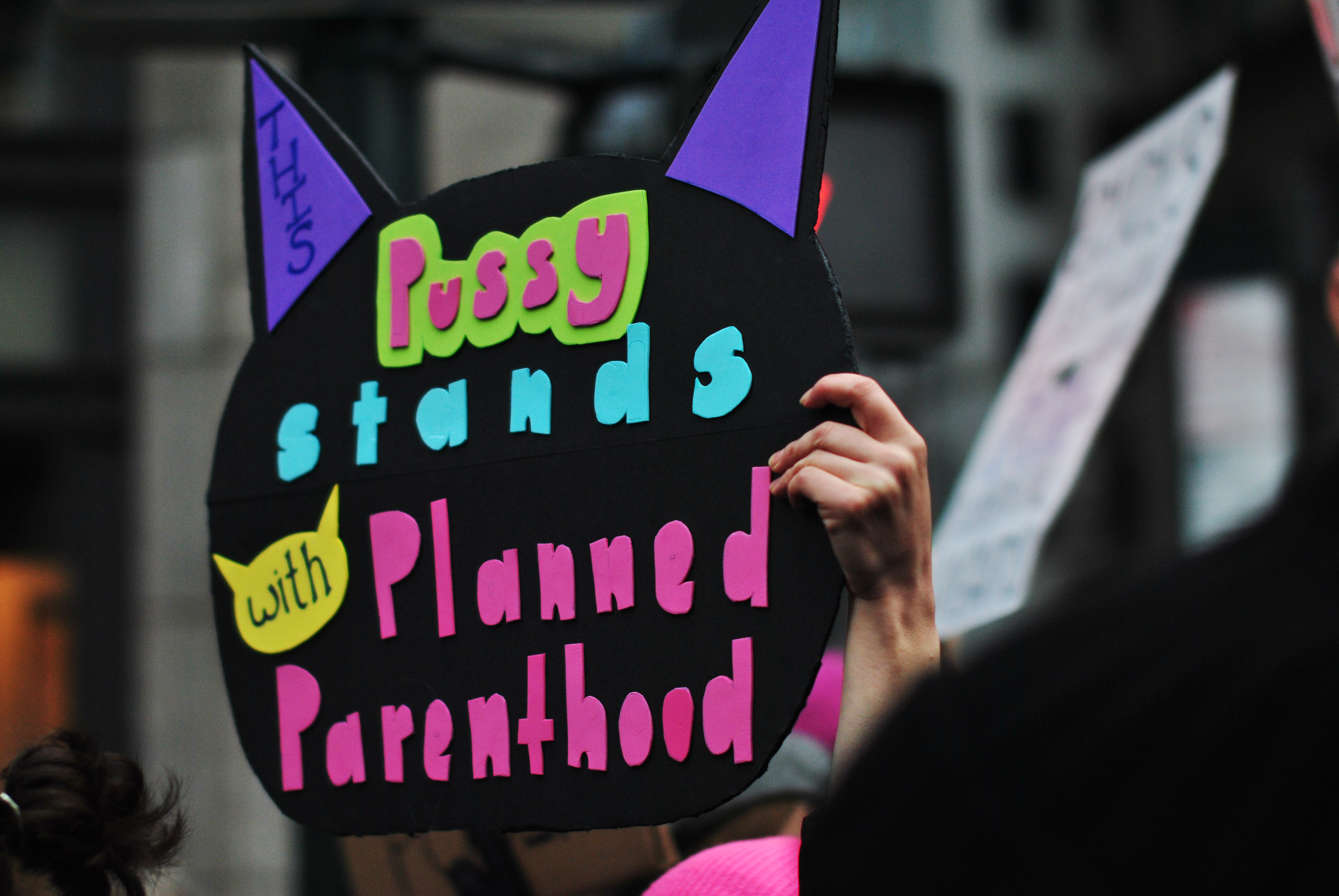
Calls to Save Planned Parenthood at 2017 New York City Women's March

Café Altro Paradiso in New York City held a fund-raiser for Planned Parenthood on May 19, 2019, to support the organization's abortion services.

=== Protests ===
Since 2018, NYC For Abortion Rights has held a counter-protest to an anti-abortion protest in Manhattan on the first Saturday of every month.

#StopTheBans was created in response to six states passing legislation in early 2019 that would almost completely outlaw abortion. Women wanted to protest this activity, as other state legislatures started to consider similar bans as part of a move to try to overturn Roe v. Wade. One protest as part of #StopTheBans took place at Foley Square in New York City on May 21.

Following the overturn of Roe v. Wade on June 24, 2022, AM New York Metro estimated that 17,000 protesters gathered in Washington Square Park, in New York City, to demonstrate against the ruling, with thousands more in Union Square. Others were spread throughout Grand Central Station, Bryant Park, and city streets. On July 7, an anti-abortion protester was charged with disorderly conduct for allegedly preventing access to a clinic in Hempstead, and an abortion rights rally in support of the clinic was held on July 21 in Mineola. On December 3, seven people were arrested when anti-abortion protesters clashed with abortion rights protesters outside of a clinic in Manhattan.

On February 4, 2023, anti-abortion protesters clashed with abortion rights protesters outside of a clinic in Manhattan. On May 6, 2023, four people were arrested after anti-abortion protesters clashed with abortion rights protesters outside of St. Patrick's Old Cathedral in Manhattan.

On March 23, 2024, 7 people were arrested during an abortion rights counter-protest of an anti-abortion march in Manhattan.

On September 28, 2024, a rally and vigil for Amber Thurman and Candi Miller was held in Washington Square Park in Manhattan.

On November 9, 2024, an anti-Trump rally was held in Manhattan.

== Anti-abortion views and activities ==
=== Activism ===
In 1873, Anthony Comstock created the New York Society for the Suppression of Vice, an institution dedicated to supervising the morality of the public. Later that year, Comstock successfully influenced the United States Congress to pass the Comstock Law, which made it illegal to deliver, through the U.S. mail, any "obscene, lewd, or lascivious" material. It also prohibited producing or publishing information pertaining to the procurement of abortion, or the prevention of conception or venereal disease, even to medical students.

=== Activities ===
In April 1992, anti-abortion activists organized the "Spring of Life" protests in Buffalo. This was one of three large anti-abortion protests that received extensive media coverage.

=== Violence ===
There was an arson attack at an abortion clinic in New York in 1979 that caused around US$250,000 in damage. An incident of anti-abortion violence occurred at an abortion clinic in New York City on December 10, 1985. Another occurred at an abortion clinic in Syracuse, New York, on May 23, 1990. Another act of violence happened at an abortion clinic in Buffalo, New York, on April 18, 1992. Dr. David Gandell of Rochester, New York, sustained serious injuries on October 28, 1997, after being targeted by a sniper firing through a window in his home.

Between 1993 and 2015, 11 people were killed at American abortion clinics. Dr. Barnett Slepian was shot to death with a high-powered rifle at his home in Amherst, New York, on October 23, 1998. His was the last in a series of similar shootings against providers in Canada and northern New York state which were all likely committed by James Kopp. Kopp was convicted of Slepian's murder after being apprehended in France in 2001.

== See also ==
- Abortion in the United States
