= CWA Ian Fleming Steel Dagger =

Annual award for the year's best thriller

The CWA Ian Fleming Steel Dagger is an annual award given by the British Crime Writers' Association for best thriller of the year. The award is sponsored by the estate of Ian Fleming.

It is given to a title that fits the broadest definition of the thriller novel; these can be set in any period and include, but are not limited to, spy fiction and/or action/adventure stories. Ian Fleming said there was one essential criterion for a good thriller – that “one simply has to turn the pages”; this is one of the main characteristics that the judges will be looking for.

== Winners ==
=== 2000s ===
Ian Fleming Steel Dagger winners and finalists, 2002-2009
Year	Author	Title	Result	Ref.
2002	John Creed	The Sirius Crossing	Winner	
2002	Tom Bradby	The Master of Rain	Finalist	
2002	Lee Child	Without Fail	Finalist	
2002	Robert Crais	Hostage	Finalist	
2002	Leif Davidsen	Lime's Photograph	Finalist	
2002	CC Humphreys	The French Executioner	Finalist	
2002	Stephen Leather	Tango One	Finalist	
2003	Dan Fesperman	The Small Boat of Great Sorrows	Winner	
2003	Lee Child	Persuader	Finalist	
2003	R. J. Ellory	Candlemoth	Finalist	
2003	Lucretia Grindle	The Nightspinners	Finalist	
2003	Robert Littell	The Company	Finalist	
2003	Henry Porter	Empire State	Finalist	
2003	Gerald Seymour	Traitor's Kiss	Finalist	
2004	Jeffery Deaver	Garden of Beasts	Winner	
2004	Dan Fesperman	The Warlord's Son	Finalist	
2004	Joseph Finder	Paranoia	Finalist	
2004	Mo Hayder	Tokyo	Finalist	
2004	Stephen Leather	Hard Landing	Finalist	
2004	Adrian McKinty	Dead I Well May Be	Finalist	
2004	Daniel Silva	The Confessor	Finalist	
2005	Henry Porter	Brandenburg	Winner	
2005	G. M. Ford	A Blind Eye	Finalist	
2005	Simon Kernick	A Good Day to Die	Finalist	
2005	Adrian Matthews	The Apothecary's House	Finalist	
2005	Kate Mosse	Labyrinth	Finalist	
2005	Joel Ross	Double Cross Blind	Finalist	
2005	Daniel Silva	A Death in Vienna	Finalist	
2006	Nick Stone	Mr Clarinet	Winner	
2006	Michael Connelly	The Lincoln Lawyer	Finalist	
2006	Jo-Ann Goodwin	Sweet Gum	Finalist	
2006	Mo Hayder	Pig Island	Finalist	
2006	Daniel Silva	The English Assassin	Finalist	
2006	Martyn Waites	The Mercy Seat	Finalist	
2006	David Wolstencroft	Contact Zero	Finalist	
2007	Gillian Flynn	Sharp Objects	Winner	
2007	Alex Berenson	The Faithful Spy	Finalist	
2007	Harlan Coben	The Woods	Finalist	
2007	R. J. Ellory	City of Lies	Finalist	
2007	Michael Marshall	The Intruders	Finalist	
2007	Michael Robotham	The Night Ferry	Finalist	
2007	Karin Slaughter	Triptych	Finalist	
2008	Tom Rob Smith	Child 44	Winner	
2008	Mo Hayder	Ritual	Finalist	
2008	Gregg Hurwitz	I See You	Finalist	
2008	Michael Robotham	Shatter	Finalist	
2008	David Stone	The Echelon Vendetta	Finalist	
2009	John Hart	The Last Child	Winner	
2009	Michael Connelly	The Brass Verdict	Finalist	
2009	Gillian Flynn	Dark Places	Finalist	
2009	Charlie Newton	Calumet City	Finalist	
2009	Daniel Silva	Moscow Rules	Finalist	
2009	Olen Steinhauer	The Tourist	Finalist	
2009	Andrew Williams	The Interrogator	Finalist	

=== 2010s ===
Ian Fleming Steel Dagger winners and finalists, 2010-2019
Year	Author	Title	Result	Ref.
2010	Simon Conway	A Loyal Spy	Winner	
2010	Lee Child	61 Hours	Finalist	
2010	Mo Hayder	Gone	Finalist	
2010	Mick Herron	Slow Horses	Finalist	
2010	Henry Porter	The Dying Light	Finalist	
2010	Scott Turow	Innocent	Finalist	
2010	Don Winslow	The Gentlemen’s Hour	Finalist	
2011	Steve Hamilton	The Lock Artist	Winner	
2011	Michael Gruber	The Good Son	Finalist	
2011	Craig Smith	Cold Rain	Finalist	
2011	S.J. Watson	Before I Go to Sleep	Finalist	
2012	Charles Cumming	A Foreign Country	Winner	
2012	Megan Abbott	Dare Me	Finalist	
2012	Robert Harris	The Fear Index	Finalist	
2012	Neal Stephenson	Reamde	Finalist	
2013	Roger Hobbs	Ghostman	Winner	
2013	Stuart Neville	Ratlines	Finalist	
2013	Mark Oldfield	The Sentinel	Finalist	
2013	Robert Wilson	Capital Punishment	Finalist	
2014	Robert Harris	An Officer and a Spy	Winner	
2014	Louise Doughty	Apple Tree Yard	Finalist	
2014	Terry Hayes	I Am Pilgrim	Finalist	
2014	Greg Iles	Natchez Burning	Finalist	
2015	Karin Slaughter	Cop Town	Winner	
2015	Sam Hawken	Missing	Finalist	
2015	Paula Hawkins	The Girl on the Train	Finalist	
2015	Mick Herron	Nobody Walks	Finalist	
2015	Patrick Hoffman	The White Van	Finalist	
2015	Malcolm Mackay	The Night the Rich Men Burned	Finalist	
2015	Peter Swanson	The Kind Worth Killing	Finalist	
2016	Don Winslow	The Cartel	Winner	
2016	Lee Child	Make Me	Finalist	
2016	Mick Herron	Real Tigers	Finalist	
2016	Adrian McKinty	Rain Dogs	Finalist	
2016	Daniel Silva	The English Spy	Finalist	
2017	Mick Herron	Spook Street	Winner	
2017	Megan Abbott	You Will Know Me	Finalist	
2017	J S Carol	The Killing Game	Finalist	
2017	Jules Grant	We Go Around in the Night and Are Consumed by Fire	Finalist	
2017	John Hart	Redemption Road	Finalist	
2017	William Ryan	The Constant Soldier	Finalist	
2018	Attica Locke	Bluebird, Bluebird	Winner	
2018	Mick Herron	London Rules	Finalist	
2018	Emily Koch	If I Die Before I Wake	Finalist	
2018	Colette McBeth	An Act of Silence	Finalist	
2018	C.J. Tudor	The Chalk Man	Finalist	
2018	Don Winslow	The Force	Finalist	
2019	Holly Watt	To The Lions	Winner	
2019	Megan Abbott	Give Me Your Hand	Finalist	
2019	Dan Fesperman	Safe Houses	Finalist	
2019	Luke Jennings	Killing Eve, No Tomorrow	Finalist	
2019	Stephen Mack Jones	Lives Laid Away	Finalist	
2019	Tim Willocks	Memo From Turner	Finalist	

=== 2020s ===
Ian Fleming Steel Dagger winners and finalists, 2020-present
Year	Author	Title	Result	Ref.
2020	Lou Berney	November Road	Winner	
2020	Tom Chatfield	This is Gomorrah	Finalist	
2020	A. A. Dhand	One Way Out	Finalist	
2020	Eva Dolan	Between Two Evils	Finalist	
2020	David Koepp	Cold Storage	Finalist	
2020	Alex North	The Whisper Man	Finalist	
2021	Michael Robotham	When She Was Good	Winner	
2021	Robert Galbraith	Troubled Blood	Finalist	
2021	Catherine Ryan Howard	The Nothing Man	Finalist	
2021	Stuart Turton	The Devil and the Dark Water	Finalist	
2021	Ruth Ware	One by One	Finalist	
2021	Chris Whitaker	We Begin at the End	Finalist	
2022	M. W. Craven	Dead Ground	Winner	
2022	Linwood Barclay	Find You First	Finalist	
2022	Sharon Bolton	The Pact	Finalist	
2022	Steve Cavanagh	The Devil's Advocate	Finalist	
2022	S. A. Cosby	Razorblade Tears	Finalist	
2022	Laura Lippman	Dream Girl	Finalist	
2023	John Brownlow	Agent Seventeen	Winner	
2023	Linwood Barclay	Take Your Breath Away	Finalist	
2023	M. W. Craven	The Botanist	Finalist	
2023	Robert Galbraith	The Ink Black Heart	Finalist	
2023	Ava Glass	The Chase	Finalist	
2023	Alan Parks	May God Forgive	Finalist	
2024	Jordan Harper	Everybody Knows	Winner	
2024	S. A. Cosby	All the Sinners Bleed	Finalist	
2024	Eli Cranor	Ozark Dogs	Finalist	
2024	Kōtarō Isaka	The Mantis	Finalist	
2024	Femi Kayode	Gas Light	Finalist	
2024	T. J. Newman	Drowning	Finalist	
