= Grindle =

Grindle is a surname. Notable people with the surname include:

- Alfred Grindle, English born architect
- Henry Dyer Grindle, American physician
- Lucretia Grindle, American author
- Nicole Paradis Grindle, American film producer
- Teal Grindle, British artistic gymnast

== See also ==
- Grindle Rock, rock near the South Sandwich Islands
