= Brockwell Park =

Park in south London, England

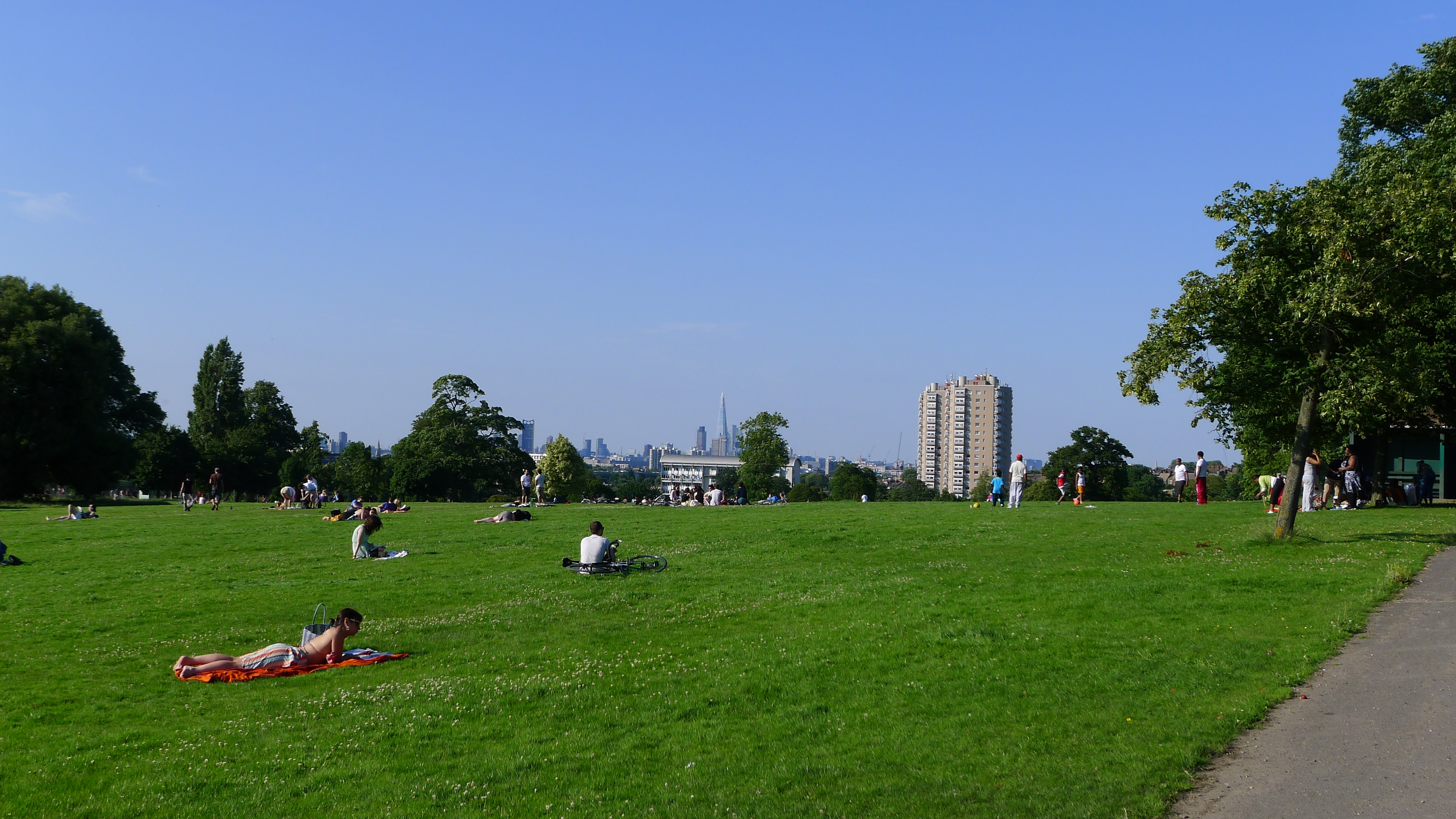
- The skyline from the highest point in Brockwell Park
- Interactive map of Brockwell Park
- Location: London, SE24; United Kingdom
- Coordinates: 51°27′03″N 0°06′27″W
- Area: 50.8 hectares (126 acres)
- Open: All year
- Public transit: Herne Hill

Brockwell Park is a 50.8-hectare (126-acre) park located south of Brixton, in Herne Hill and Tulse Hill in south London. It is bordered by the roads Brixton Water Lane, Norwood Road, Tulse Hill and Dulwich Road.

The park commands views of the skyline of the city and Central London, and hosts almost 4 million annual visits. At the top of the hill within the park stands Brockwell Hall.

Whilst competing against multiple demands from a broad range of other interests, the entirety of Brockwell Park is a Site of Importance for Nature Conservation (SINC) of Borough Importance (Grade I), with mature trees including ancient oaks, substantial lawn areas set to meadow, and a series of lakes. As well as adding to the landscape value, these support a variety of birds, and bats including Pipistrelles, with frequent visits from rarer species like Daubentons, Noctule, Leisler's and Serotine bat.

The park is listed for its heritage value on The National Heritage List for England, Parks & Gardens, Grade II. Noted for its nineteenth-century layout as a gracious public park, the clocktower, water garden, J. J. Sexby-designed walled garden and other monuments, the park provides a pleasant exploration with links to its eighteenth-century agricultural past in the hedge lines, and mature oak trees. The model village houses outside the walled garden were originally donated to London County Council by Edgar Wilson in 1943.

The Brockwell Lido, a Grade II listed art deco building near the north of the park, is an open-air swimming pool popular with swimmers and bathers. Its attached café/restaurant is also popular. Other amenities in Brockwell Park include tennis courts, a bowling green, a BMX track and a miniature railway.

Brockwell Park is open from 7.30 am to 15 minutes before sunset every day.

== History ==
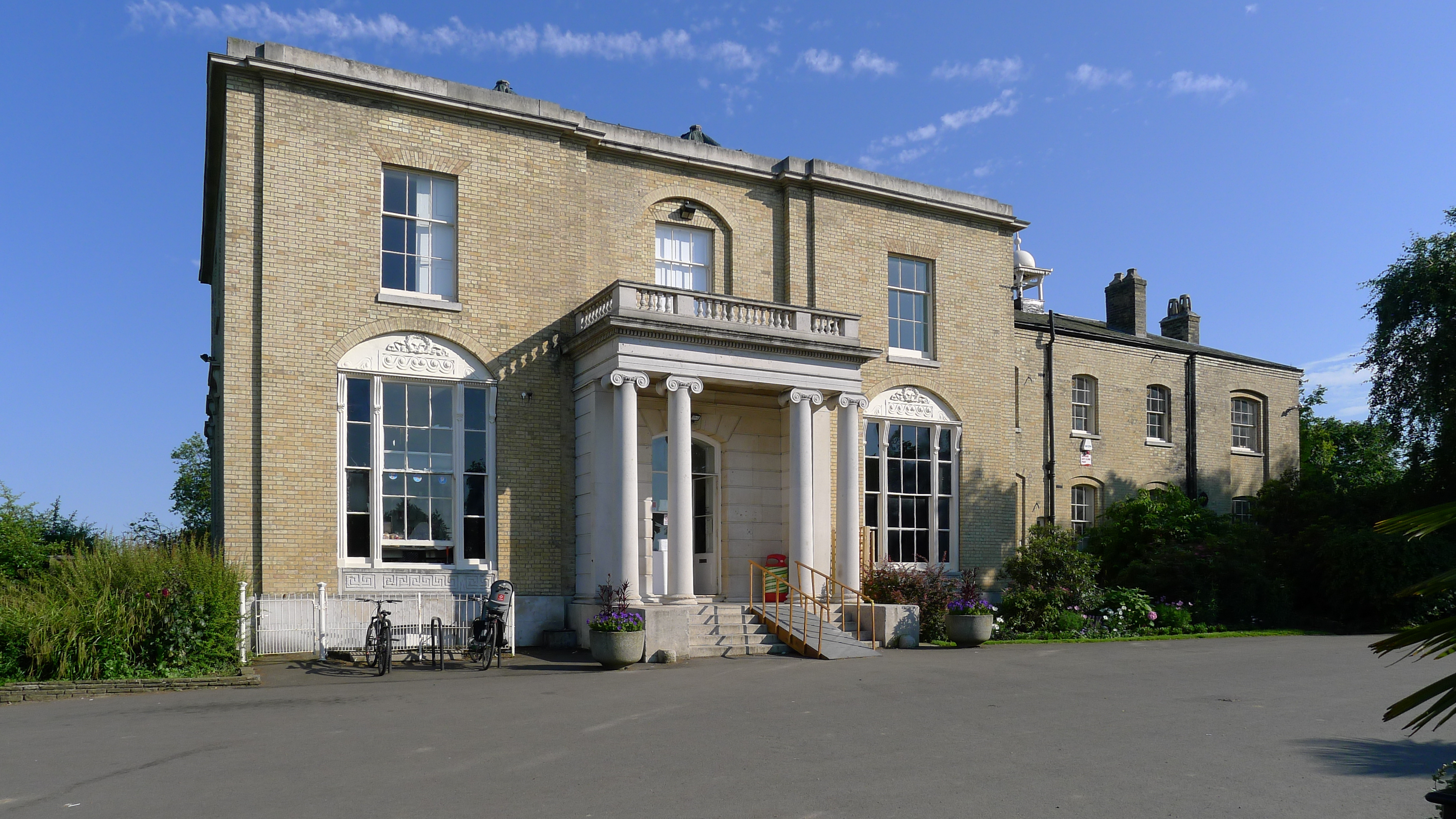
Brockwell Hall in 2012

The Grade II* listed Brockwell Hall was built between 1811 and 1813 when the area was part of Surrey and was the country seat of glass merchant John Blades Esq. The land and house were acquired by the London County Council (LCC) in March 1891 and opened to the public on 2 June in the following summer, led by the local MP Thomas Lynn Bristowe. At the unveiling, Bristowe died of a heart attack on the steps of the hall.

In 1901, the LCC acquired a further 43 acres (17 ha) of land north of the original park. In the 1920s, there were 13 cricket pitches in the park, which attracted crowds of up to 1,500. Brockwell Park was home to the Galton Institute.

During World War I it is recorded that Brockwell Park grazed a large flock of sheep. During World War II, three sites in the park were set aside for wartime food production in the form of 'Pig Clubs', built of timber and bricks salvaged from bombed houses. Pig swill for this purpose was collected from local homes.

A bust of Thomas Bristowe was returned to the park and unveiled on its 120th birthday, 2012.

The park is Grade II listed on the Register of Historic Parks and Gardens.

== Facilities ==
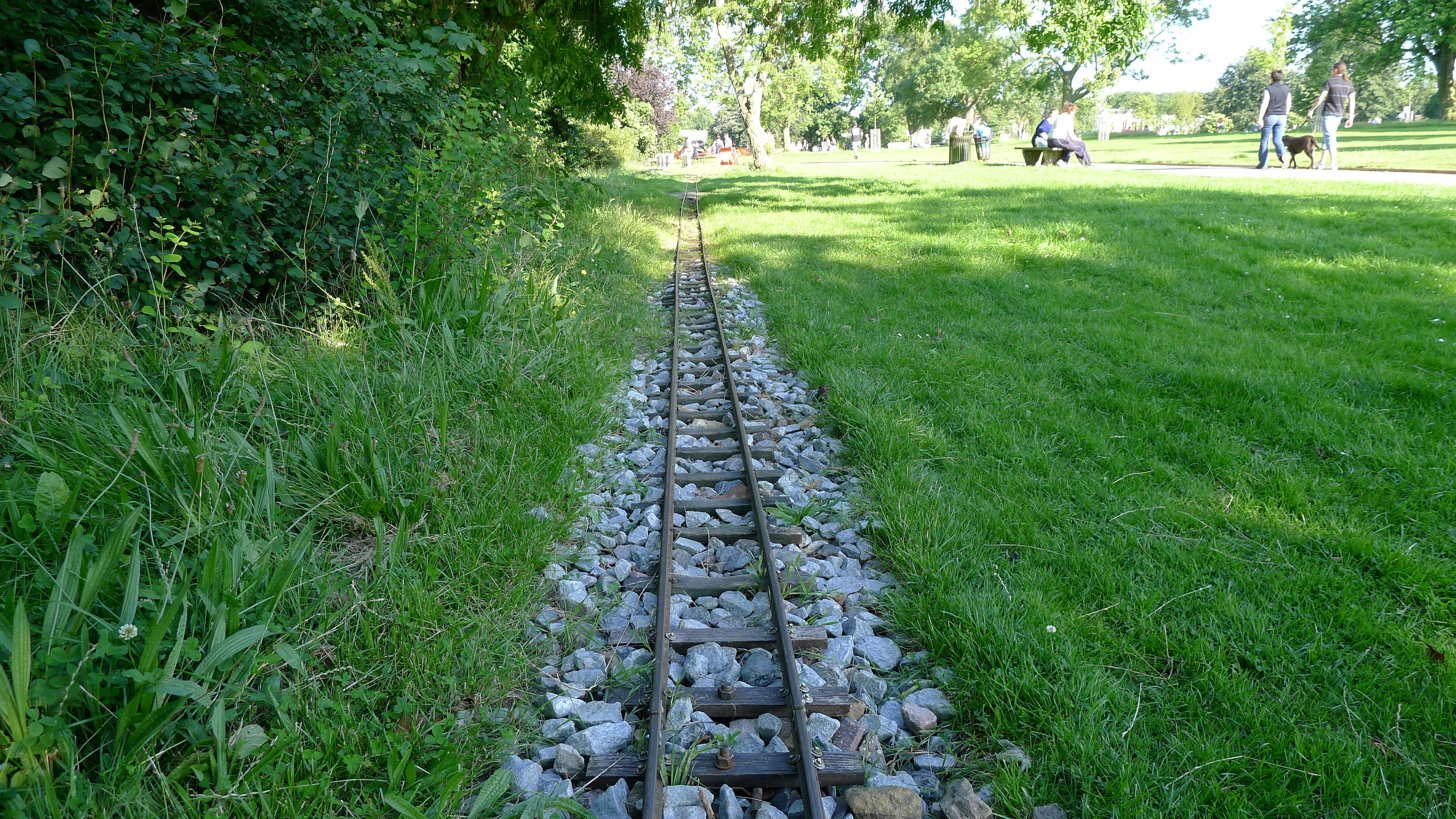
The track of the miniature railway

- A children's paddling pool (open in the summertime only)
- A dog free children's play area
- A miniature railway 7 1/4 in (184 mm) gauge
- One O'Clock Club
- A café, inside Brockwell Hall at the top of the hill
- A walled garden with many flowers and herbs
- Community greenhouses
- Three duck ponds
- The Giant Conker, a wooden sculpture near the Brixton Water Lane entrance

=== Sports ===
- The refurbished 1930s Brockwell Lido has, as well as the swimming pool, other health and fitness facilities

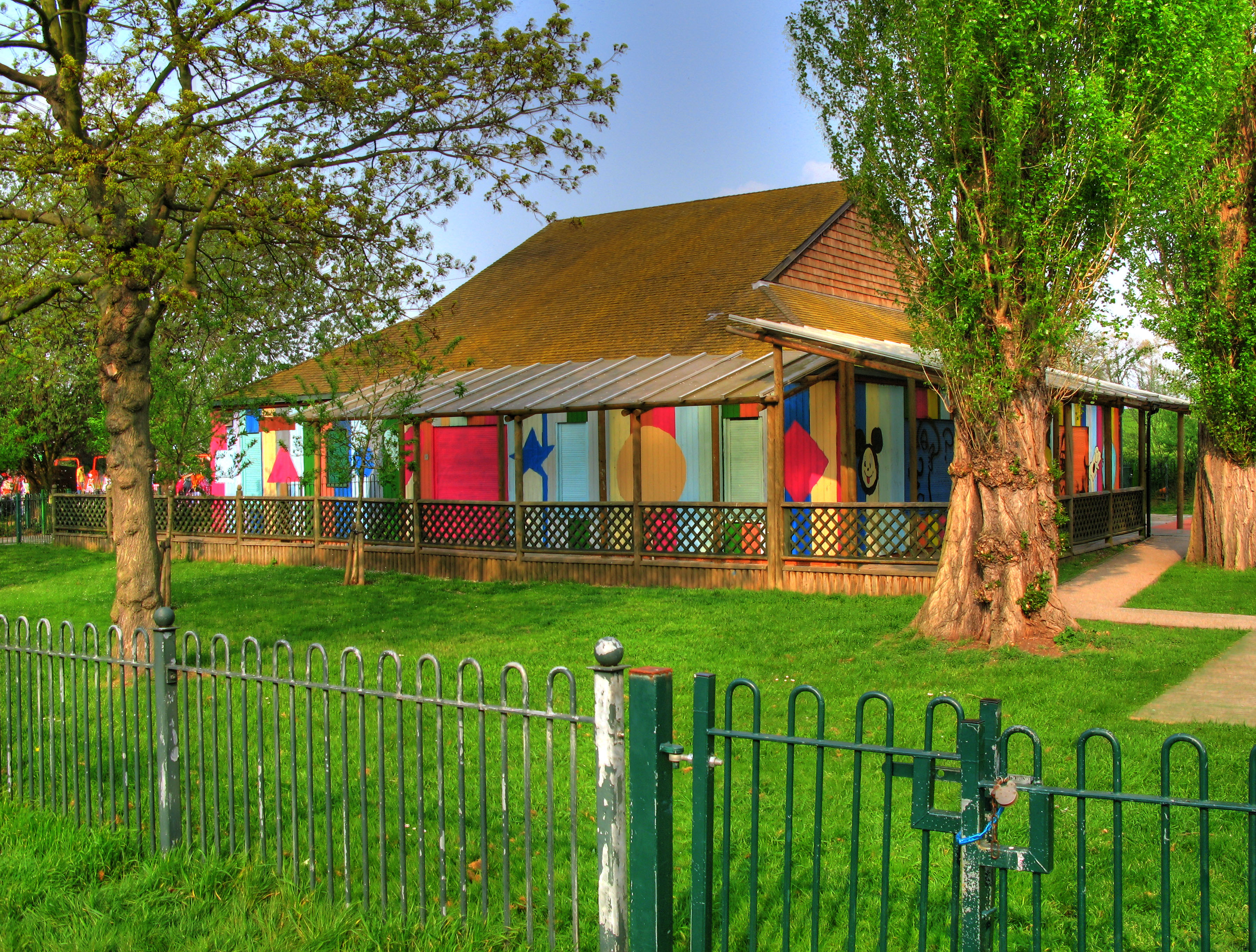
A hut in Brockwell Park

- An all-weather pitch
- A bowling green
- A purpose-built BMX track
- Tennis courts
- A Basketball/Volleyball court
- Grass and gravel football pitches
- Cricket nets
- A free weekly 5 km Saturday Parkrun
- 5 a side football on Sunday

== Festivals and shows ==
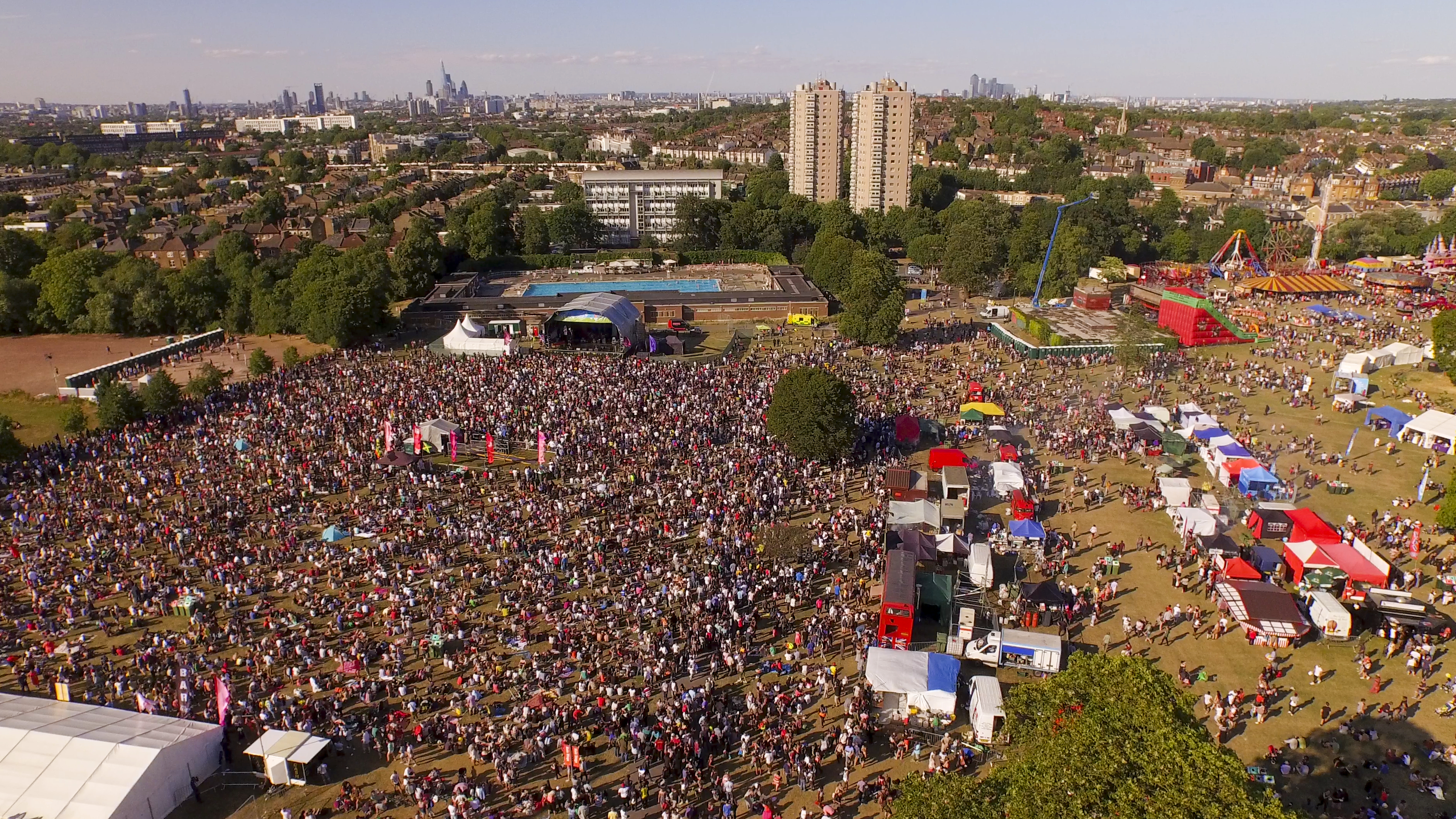
Lambeth Country Show 2015 Main Stage

The park is home to the free Lambeth Country Show, held at various dates during summer since 1974. However, the 2026 show has been cancelled, with the Council citing budget pressures. Its not known as yet whether it will return in 2027.

A ticketed annual fireworks display, attracting an estimated 30,000 people, last took place in 2018 with the Council cancelling it in 2019 for financial reasons.

The park has previously hosted large-scale free to attend and open music events, including an estimated crowd of 150,000 in attendance at a Rock Against Racism carnival in September 1978, headlined by Elvis Costello and The Attractions, and with "people in trees, on the roofs of the flats and on the lido wall". Costello ended his Brockwell Park performance with the song '(What's So Funny 'Bout) Peace, Love, and Understanding'. A further Rock Against Racism event including performances by Aswad and Stiff Little Fingers was also held in the park in September 1979.

In May 1981, Aswad and Pete Townshend "swigging Remy Martin brandy" headlined a TUC benefit gig for the 'People's March For Jobs' campaign, with a crowd of 70,000 in attendance. In May 1982, Brockwell Park hosted a Cannabis Law Reform Rally, including "a wicked turbo sound rig with Jah Shaka, Coxone, King Sounds and DBC Rebel Radio´s boxes all connected in a huge horseshoe". Madness also headlined a Greater London Council / CND 'Festival for Peace' in Brockwell Park in 1983, compered by John Peel, with a crowd of 30,000 in attendance. Paul Weller's new band The Style Council made only their second public appearance at this festival. Unfortunate scheduling of the support acts, meant that many arriving in Brockwell Park hoping to see The Damned had already missed their 35-minute set, and subsequent support acts, including The Style Council and Hazel O'Connor, were pelted with mud, amid chants of "We want The Damned".

In August 1984, the park hosted a GLC free festival, where Leader Ken Livingstone gave a speech, and the increasingly rowdy crowd during performances by The Fall and Spear of Destiny was calmed by poet Benjamin Zephaniah before the headline set by The Damned. One eyewitness recalls The Fall being pelted with cans during their performance, with singer Mark E. Smith narrowly dodging one effort, "about an inch from his face, when he suddenly twitched to the right and let it sail past him".

The park has also hosted reggae festivals, and the London Pride festival in 1993 and 1994. In May 1994, an Anti Nazi League Carnival in Brockwell Park featured performances by The Manic Street Preachers, The Levellers, and Billy Bragg. Between 2000 and 2004, the park hosted an annual cannabis festival. The cannabis festival was eventually stopped in 2005 by Lambeth Council, after drug dealing at previous events.

In June 2002, Australian band Midnight Oil headlined The Fierce Festival in Brockwell Park in front of a crowd of 20,000 people. A dance event called Purple in the Park was held on the preceding day, headlined by Grace Jones, and including performances by Boy George and Yoko Ono. The two events, held over the Queen's Golden Jubilee weekend, had a capacity set at 50,000.

Paid-for music events have been taking place in Brockwell Park for a number of years, including Found Festival in 2016 and Sunfall Festival in 2017. In 2018, Brockwell Park hosted Field Day and Mighty Hoopla festivals for the first time. This led to local opposition towards monetising of the park, and the erection of a 12 foot high steel fence to accommodate the pay events. In 2019, the Park also hosted Cross The Tracks. In 2021, the festival Wide Awake launched in the Park. In 2022, City Splash moved to the Park also. With the addition of Project 6 in 2023, these became part of the Brockwell Live series of festivals, running from late May to early June.

Poor weather in 2024 combined with the festival season led to deteriorating conditions in the Park, resulting in the cancellation of a free family event Brockwell Bounce. This led to growing opposition of the heavy use of the Park for festivals, from groups including Friends of Brockwell Park. In 2025, a group named Protect Brockwell Park continued opposition and launched legal action. On 16 May, the group won their legal challenge against Lambeth Council at the High Court, putting the 2025 festivals at risk.

Lambeth Council and Brockwell Live announced on 20 May that the judgment concerned "a particular point of law and whether an administrative process had been carried out correctly" and the festivals would go ahead as planned. Despite further opposition from Protect Brockwell Park that the High Court ruling meant that this was not the case, Lambeth Council approved new planning for the festivals on the eve of them commencing.

== Brockwell Park in popular culture ==
As far back as 1913, it was said that, "On the whole probably the people in Brockwell Park, like those in Hyde Park and the other parks, would refuse the weaker Italian stuff and demand the Wagner over and over again".

The San Francisco band Red House Painters wrote a song about the park, named "Brockwell Park", for their 1995 album Ocean Beach. The Ocean Beach album also features an unlisted hidden track, referred to as "Brockwell Park (Part 2)".

In a 2015 Adele at the BBC TV special, singer and songwriter Adele said her song "Million Years Ago" was related to Brockwell Park, stating: "I drove past Brockwell Park, which is a park in south London I used to live by. It's where I spent a lot of my youth. It has quite monumental moments of my life that I've spent there, and I drove past it and I just literally burst into tears."

Brockwell Park is the setting for the music video of "Do Your Thing" by local band Basement Jaxx.

Brockwell Park was used as a filming base camp for the 2015 movie The Man from U.N.C.L.E directed by Guy Ritchie.

The park is a key location in Mo Hayder's crime novel The Treatment.
