= Abortion in American Samoa =

Abortion in American Samoa is illegal. These laws were passed in the 1980s. When the Zika virus hit in 2015 and 2016, women could not get abortions unless they had enough money to fly to Hawaii. In 2018, abortion pills were not available but the morning after pill was.

== History ==
In 2016, the Zika virus hit American Samoa particularly hard, despite efforts to prevent its spread, with 21 pregnant women known to have contracted the virus in a population of 55,000 people. Pregnant women across American Samoa were given condoms when seeking prenatal care at four clinics and one hospital starting in 2015 and continuing to 2016. This was facilitated in part by all prenatal care in American Samoa being subsidized by the government beginning in the summer of 2015, which also increased women seeking prenatal care as they previously waited until the third-trimester to seek care. Pregnant women confirmed as having the Zika virus had few options as the only way to get an abortion is if the life of the mother was at risk and the Zika virus did not qualify as such an exception; if women wanted an abortion, their only real option if they could afford it, and most could not, was to fly to Hawaii.

=== Legislative history ===
A September 20, 1985 directive from the American Samoa Attorney General stated that elective abortions are unconstitutional and that no such procedures can occur at public hospitals. Legal code section 46.3904, which passed in 1986, said that no physician or hospital employee can be compelled to participate in an abortion procedure if doing so goes against their conscience, and that such refusals are immune to criminal, administrative or disciplinary action. Legal code sections passed in 1986 declared that the only persons who can perform a legal abortion in American Samoa are licensed American Samoan physicians. As of 1998, legal code sections 46.3902 and 46.3903, which were adopted in 1986, made any attempt to terminate a pregnancy except in the case of saving the physical or mental health of the mother a crime.

=== Contraceptive history ===
As of 2014, abortion medications like mifepristone were not available in American Samoa, because the government does not permit Title X funding to be used for abortions. The morning after pill was available because it prevented conception and was not legally considered an abortifacient.
