= Skin (Hayder novel) =

2009 novel by Mo Hayder

- First edition cover
- Author: Mo Hayder
- Publisher: Grove Press
- Publication date: February 2010
- ISBN: 978-0-802-11930-8

Skin (2009) is a novel by British writer Mo Hayder. The novel is the fourth to feature her series character Jack Caffery.
