= A Quiet Belief In Angels =

2007 thriller novel by R. J. Ellory

- First edition
- Author: R J Ellory
- Cover artist: Getty Images & Alamy
- Language: English
- Genre: Thriller
- Publisher: Orion
- Publication date: 22 August 2007
- Publication place: United Kingdom
- Pages: 368
- ISBN: 0-7528-7368-7

A Quiet Belief In Angels is a thriller novel written by R. J. Ellory. The novel was released on 22 August 2007, and is Ellory's fifth novel. A Quiet Belief In Angels has sold over 2.5 million copies since release, and has been translated into twenty-six languages, including French, Japanese, Norwegian, Lithuanian, and Brazilian Portuguese.

== Plot ==
A Quiet Belief In Angels is written from the perspective of Joseph Vaughan, growing up in a rural community in early 1940s Georgia. Early in the novel, Joseph's father passes away from a fever, and Joseph likens a white feather on his pillow to his father's angel. Afterwards, a serial killer begins committing a spree of murders, abducting and brutally killing young girls. Joseph and his friends form a group known as "the Guardians" devoting themselves to protecting the town's girls from any further harm. The townsfolk begin to suspect a German farmer named Gunther Kruger, mainly due to rising tensions because of the Second World War, and burn down his family home, killing his youngest daughter, whom Joseph had sworn to protect when the killings began. The Kruger family leave town, and the townsfolk seem satisfied the killings will leave with them.

== Writing style ==
The novel is written in a first-person narrative, and Ellory uses descriptive prose extensively. For example, "Blame is a bitter and indigestible thing, even when the blame is a coat you cut for yourself, even when you stood right there and got yourself measured so you could wear it right.".

== Reception ==
A Quiet Belief In Angels received generally positive reviews. Current Amazon ratings for the book give it four out of five. The social cataloging website Goodreads holds a score of 3.5 out of 5. It was ranked third in the Sunday Times bestselling book list in the week of its review on TV. It was shortlisted for the Barry Award for best British crime fiction 2008, the 7th Prix Du Polar Européen 2008 of the weekly French magazine Le Point, Le Nouvel Observateur Crime Writing Prize 2008 and the Quebec Booksellers' Prize 2008. The book was featured on the Richard & Judy British Book awards of 2008.

It went on to win the Inaugural Roman Noir Nouvel Observateur Prize in 2009, the Best Thriller 2009 by New York's Strand magazine, along with the Livre De Poche Award, the Southern Independent Booksellers' Award 2010, and the USA National Indie Excellence Award for Best Mystery.
