= John Hart (author) =

American author of thriller novels (born 1995)

- Born: 1965 (age 60–61); North Carolina, U.S.
- Education: Davidson College
- Occupation: Author
- Writing career
- Genre: Thriller
- Notable awards: CWA Ian Fleming Steel Dagger (2009); Edgar Allan Poe Award for Best Novel (2008, 2010); Barry Award (2010); SIBA Book Award (2012)
- Website: www.johnhartfiction.com

John Hart (born 1965) is an American author of thriller novels. His books take place in North Carolina, where he was born and once lived. He presently resides in Charlottesville, Virginia. He is a 2012 graduate of Davidson College. His work has been compared to that of Scott Turow and John Grisham.

Hart has won two Edgar Allan Poe Awards for Best Novel, one in 2008 for Down River, and the second in 2010 for The Last Child. He is the only author in history to win the best novel Edgar Award for consecutive novels. He also won the Barry Award (2010; novel) for The Last Child, the SIBA Book Award (2012; fiction) for Iron House, and the Ian Fleming Steel Dagger (2009) for The Last Child.

== Bibliography ==
- 2006 The King of Lies
- 2007 Down River
- 2009 The Last Child
- 2011 Iron House
- 2016 Redemption Road
- 2018 The Hush
- 2021 The Unwilling
