= Susannah Lattin =

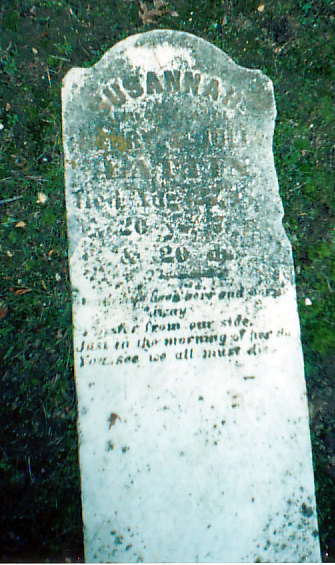
- Fallen gravestone in Powell Cemetery in 2002
- Born: January 7, 1848; Farmingdale, New York, US
- Died: August 27, 1868 (aged 20); Manhattan, New York, US
- Cause of death: Postpartum infection
- Known for: Abortion debate

Susannah Lattin (January 7, 1848 – August 27, 1868) was an American woman who died of a postpartum infection at an illegal maternity clinic at 6 Amity Place in New York City, operated by Henry Dyer Grindle. Her death led to an investigation which resulted in regulation of maternity clinics and adoptions in New York City in 1868.

== Early life ==
Lattin was born in Farmingdale on Long Island. Around 1867, Lattin moved from Farmingdale to Williamsburg in Brooklyn, where she lived with her cousin Andrew Wood.

== Unplanned pregnancy ==
Lattin became pregnant by George C. Houghton; he was a clerk at Whitehouse's boot and shoe store on Fulton Street, Brooklyn. He paid $50 to Dr. J.C. Harrison to perform an abortion, but Lattin did not go through with it. She was still hoping that Houghton would marry her. Houghton then quit his job and moved to Philadelphia, to escape the situation. Lattin next went to her cousin, George H. Powell who worked as a butcher at the Washington Market to help her. He pretended to be her husband and arranged for her, as "Mrs. Smith", to see Dr. Henry D. Grindle, who ran an unauthorized "lying-in" hospital that allowed pregnant woman to have their children and have them illegally adopted. The doctor wanted her to pay $150, but she could only pay $100 and he accepted it.

== Death and aftermath ==
Lattin checked into the lying-in hospital on August 5, 1868, then a few weeks later she delivered a healthy baby boy who was adopted anonymously without any record kept of the adoptive parents. Around August 18, 1868, she developed a postpartum infection. The medical student who attended to her realized Susannah was in serious condition and was not likely to survive, and he persuaded her to tell him her real name so he could notify her family. The message got to her parents after she had died. Coroner Aaron B. Rollins investigated the death.

From: 6 Amity Place, Manhattan. To: Mr. Henry Lattin. Dear Sir: You daughter is at No. 6 Amity Place, very sick with typhoid fever, and I do not expect her to live twenty-four hours. She inquires about her mother frequently, and wants her to come immediately. Yours truly, E. Daun. P.S. take the Fulton Street cars at the ferry and they will take you to the house. E. Daun.

Susannah Lattin's death led to an investigation that resulted in regulating maternity clinics and adoptions in New York City in 1868.

=== Inquest verdict ===
Susannah Lattin came to death by metroperitonitis, the result of child-birth at D.H. Grindle's establishment at No. 6 Amity Place on August 27, 1868. We further censure Dr. Grindle for the irregular method of operating his business, relative to taking in women to confine, and also the method of adopting children so delivered. We further recommend the Legislature to so enact a law whereby all such establishments shall be under the supervision of the Board of Health, or any other recognized authority. We further condemn the practice of any regular medical college recognizing students connected with any such establishments.
