= Benjamin Nathan =

Jewish-American investor, philanthropist, murder victim (1813–1870)

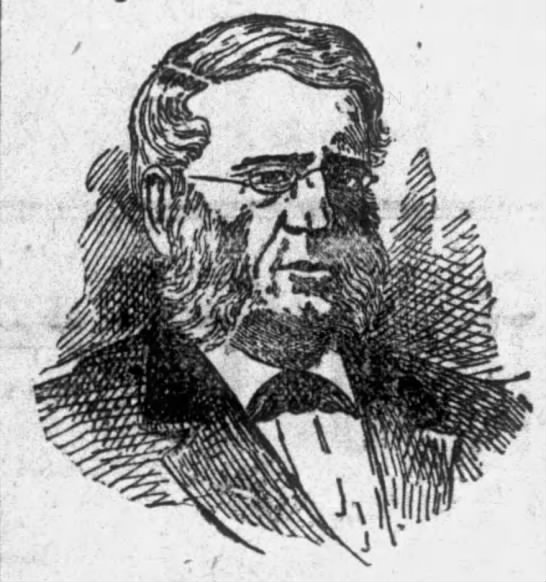
- Born: December 20, 1813
- Died: July 28, 1870 (aged 56); Manhattan, New York, US
- Cause of death: Bludgeoned To Death
- Spouse: Emily Grace Hendricks (m. 1836)

Benjamin Nathan (December 20, 1813 – July 28, 1870) was an American investor and philanthropist. He was bludgeoned to death in his home in 1870, and the notorious murder case remains unsolved despite several trials in the years following his death.

== Biography ==
He was elected a member of the New York Stock Exchange in 1836, and became its vice-president in 1851. He served as a director of the Chicago and North Western Railway and the Ninth Avenue Street Railway. He also served on the first Board of Directors for Jews' Hospital. He was also President of Shearith Israel.

In 1849, he was promoted to colonel and named aide-de-camp to New York State Governor Hamilton Fish. Supreme Court Judge Benjamin Nathan Cardozo, his nephew, was born the year Nathan died and was named after him. Nathan's wife Emily G. Nathan died in 1879. They had seven children, including Frederick Nathan and Washington Nathan.

== Death ==
In July 1870, the weather was very hot in New York City and the Nathan family were staying at their country home in Morristown, New Jersey. Benjamin Nathan regularly commuted from New Jersey to New York City and on occasion would spend the night at his townhouse on 23rd Street. Benjamin Nathan, along with two of his sons, Frederick and Washington, arrived unannounced to the townhouse on the night of July 28. The house was in the process of redecoration, so Nathan had to sleep on a makeshift bed made of mattresses. Both of his sons went out that night, with Frederick returning home at around 11:15 pm, and Washington returning home later than anticipated between midnight and 1:00 am due to a violent thunderstorm.

Washington woke up the next morning early, as plans were made to accompany their father to the synagogue for a memorial for Benjamin's late wife. Around 6:00 am he discovered the body of his father lying on the floor. Washington called for his brother Frederick and they eventually ran out to the street to call for a police officer. It appeared that Benjamin Nathan died from blunt force trauma.

The announcement of the murder caused a great sensation in New York City. The mayor and Nathan's widow offered a reward and the New York Stock Exchange opened that day with the flag flying at half-mast.

The press and the public largely considered his son Washington Nathan as the prime suspect, though his motive would have been unclear. The case remains unsolved.

Aaron B. Rollins was the coroner who investigated the death.

== Legacy ==
Studies in Murder, a 1924 true crime book of essays by Edmund Pearson, is about the murder.

== See also ==
- List of unsolved murders (before 1900)
