= The Last Child =

2009 suspense thriller by John Hart

- First edition
- Author: John Hart
- Language: English
- Genre: suspense thriller
- Published: 2009 (Minotaur Books)
- Publication place: United States
- Media type: Print (hardcover)
- Pages: 384
- ISBN: 978-0-312-35932-4

The Last Child is a suspense thriller by American novelist John Hart. It was first published in 2009 by Minotaur Books.

== Awards and distinctions ==
- 2010 Edgar Award winner for Best Novel
- 2010 Anthony Award nominee for Best Novel
- 2010 Barry Award winner for Best Novel
- 2009 Crime Writers' Association Ian Fleming Steel Dagger Award winner for best thriller published in the UK
- New York Times best seller
- Kirkus Reviews starred review
