= Birdman (novel) =

Novel by Mo Hayder

- First edition
- Author: Mo Hayder
- Language: English
- Series: Jack Caffery no 1
- Genre: Thriller novel
- Publisher: Bantam Books
- Publication date: 1 December 1999
- Publication place: United Kingdom
- Media type: Print (Hardback & Paperback)
- Pages: 363pp (hardback)
- ISBN: 0-593-04520-3
- OCLC: 42406460
- Followed by: The Treatment

Birdman (1999) was the first novel of British crime-writer Mo Hayder. It introduced her protagonist Detective Inspector Jack Caffery.

== Plot summary ==
Caffery gets involved in the frightening case of five murdered women whose mutilated corpses are found in the outskirts of London. His investigation yields a treasure trove of abominations. Caffery knows his department is looking in the wrong place for the perpetrator, but he cannot guess at the forces he is up against, or the true darkness of a killer's heart. The manhunt builds as a killer is cornered. The sequel is The Treatment.
