= Peter Swanson =

American novelist (born 1968)

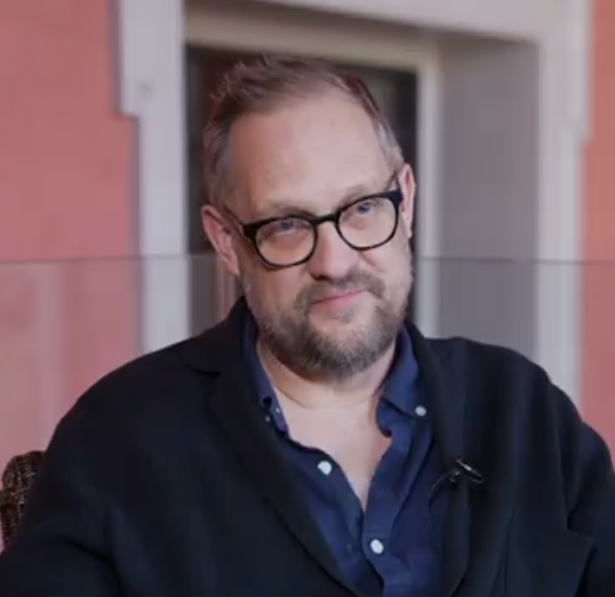
- In a 2025 interview
- Born: May 26, 1968 (age 58); Concord, Massachusetts, U.S.
- Occupation: Author
- Spouse: Charlene Sawyer

Peter Swanson (born May 26, 1968) is an American author, best known for his psychological suspense novels The Kind Worth Killing, Her Every Fear, and Eight Perfect Murders.

His ninth novel, The Kind Worth Saving, a sequel to The Kind Worth Killing, was published in March 2023. His eleventh novel, A Talent for Murder, appeared in June 2024.

Swanson received his first book deal at age forty-four after an agent read one of his short stories online and asked him to turn it into a full-length novel, leading to the eventual publication of his debut novel The Girl With a Clock for a Heart. He has also written poetry.

== Personal life ==
Swanson lives on the North Shore of Massachusetts with his wife.

== Books ==
- The Girl with a Clock for a Heart (2014) ISBN 978-0-06-226749-8
- The Kind Worth Killing (2015) ISBN 978-0-06-226752-8
- Her Every Fear (2017) ISBN 978-0-06-242702-1
- All the Beautiful Lies (2018) ISBN 978-0-06-242705-2
- Before She Knew Him (2019) ISBN 978-0-06-283815-5
- Eight Perfect Murders (2020) ISBN 978-0-06-283820-9 (also published as Rules for Perfect Murders)
- Every Vow You Break: A Novel (2021) ISBN 978-0-06-298003-8
- Nine Lives: A Novel (2022) ISBN 9780063210998
- The Kind Worth Saving (2023) ISBN 9780063204980
- The Christmas Guest (2023) ISBN 9780063297456 (novella)
- A Talent for Murder (2024) ISBN 9780063205031
- Kill Your Darlings (2025) ISBN 978-0063433625
- Do You See What I See? (2026) ISBN 978-0-06-343367-0 (novella)

== Awards ==
- Crime Writers' Association Ian Fleming Steel Dagger finalist (2015)
- New England Society Book Award (2016)
