= R. J. Ellory =

English thriller writer

Roger Jon Ellory
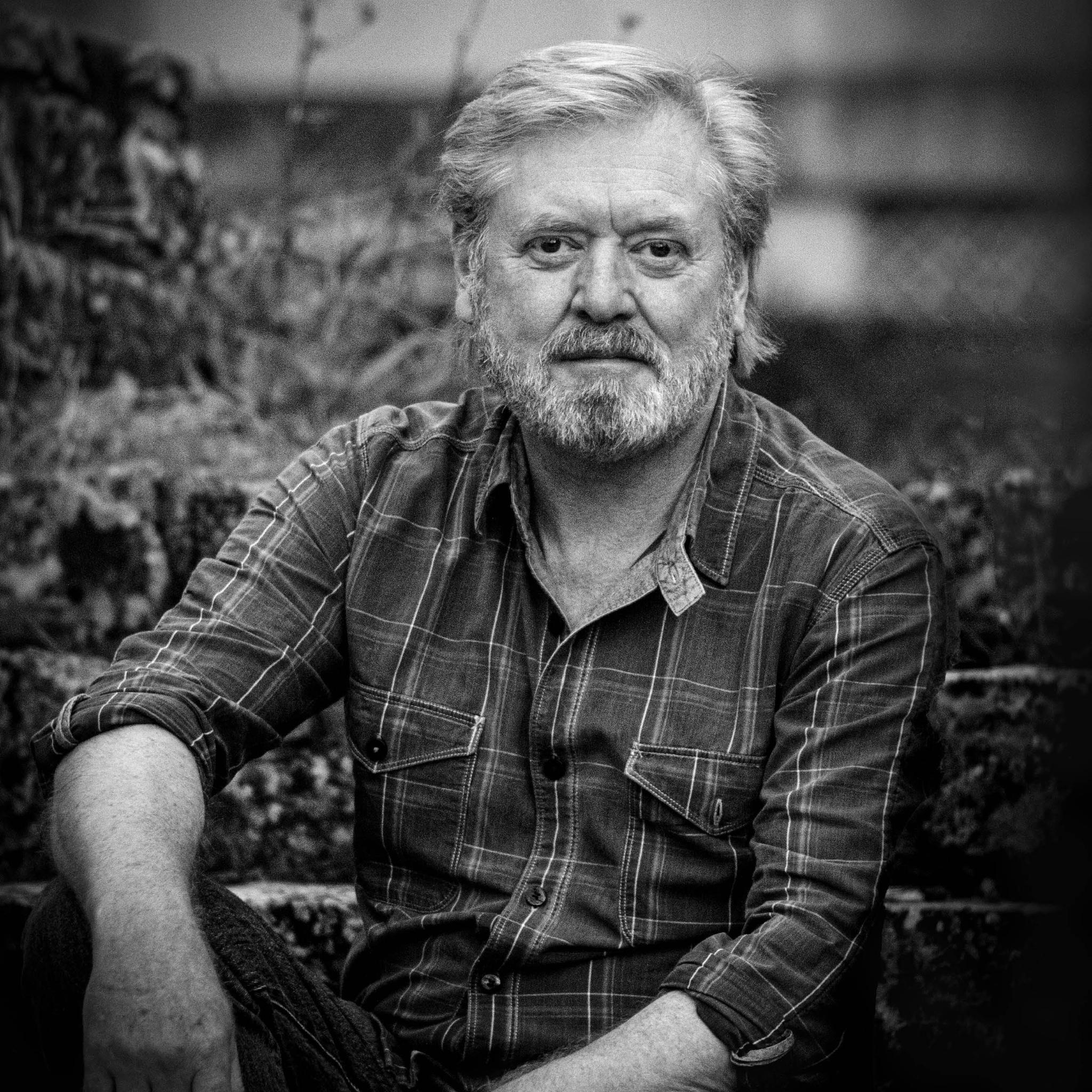
- Ellory in 2024, Deux-Sèvres, France
- Born: 20 June 1965 (age 61); Birmingham, England
- Occupation: Writer
- Writing career
- Language: English
- Genre: Thriller
- Website: www.rjellory.com

Roger Jon Ellory (born 20 June 1965) is an English thriller writer.

== Personal life ==
Ellory lives in Birmingham, England. He cites Arthur Conan Doyle, Michael Moorcock, J. R. R. Tolkien and Stephen King as people who influenced his writing. He is an avid fan of BookCrossing and apart from his work as an author, he is interested in music. He is currently a singer and guitar player with a band called The Whiskey Poets.

Ellory's father is unknown to him, having left the household before Ellory was born. He was raised by his mother and maternal grandmother, his maternal grandfather having drowned in 1957 in Wales. Ellory's mother died as a result of a pneumonic haemorrhage in late 1971, the victim of a pneumonia epidemic that killed a number of people in the West Midlands. Ellory was then sent to a number of different schools, and finally completed his education at Kingham Hill School in Oxfordshire, a school established by the Barings-Young banking family as a facility for "wayward and orphaned children".

Leaving this school at 16, Ellory returned to Birmingham, where he pursued a diploma in graphic art and design at Bournville College of Art. After one year, Ellory's maternal grandmother died in April 1982 and Ellory dropped out of college, failing to secure any qualifications.

In 2012, Ellory admitted having used a pseudonymous account name to write a positive review for each his own novels, and additionally a negative review for two other authors. He made a public statement of apology, and the aforementioned reviews were withdrawn from Amazon. The Crime Writers' Association, for which Ellory formerly served as a board member, expressed concern about this "unfair" practice, and confirmed it had launched a review.

== Writing ==
His first novel to be accepted for publication, Candlemoth, was published in 2003 and was shortlisted for the CWA Ian Fleming Steel Dagger Award that year. Ghostheart was published in 2004 and A Quiet Vendetta in 2005. His fourth novel, City of Lies (2006), was shortlisted for the CWA Steel Dagger for Best Thriller. A Quiet Belief in Angels was selected as one of the titles in the Richard & Judy Bookclub 2008. A Quiet Belief in Angels has sold more than 1,000,000 copies, and has also been purchased for translation into a total of twenty-six languages. It was ranked third in the Sunday Times bestselling book list in the week of its review on TV. It was shortlisted for the Barry Award for best British crime fiction 2008, the 7th Prix Du Polar Européen 2008 of the weekly French magazine Le Point, Le Nouvel Observateur's Crime Writing Prize 2008, and the Quebec Booksellers' Prize 2008. It won the Strand Magazine Thriller of the Year. It won Le Nouvel Observateur's inaugural Prix du Roman Noir in 2009. In October 2008 A Simple Act of Violence won Theakston's Crime Novel of the Year 2010.

Between March and April 2012, Ellory released a trilogy of novellas making up the ebook-exclusive Three Days in Chicagoland, focusing on the brutal murder of a young girl in Chicago in 1956, as told from three different viewpoints: The Sister, The Cop and The Killer.

== Awards ==
In 2003, Ellory's debut novel, Candlemoth, was shortlisted for the CWA Steel Dagger for Best Thriller. His fourth book, City of Lies, was shortlisted for the same award in 2007.

Papillon de Nuit, the French translation of Candlemoth, won both the Balai d'Or Award 2017 and the Grand Prix des Lecteurs 2017.

A Quiet Belief in Angels, his fifth title, was shortlisted for the Barry Award for Best British Crime Fiction 2008. The novel was also shortlisted for the Association 813 Trophy, the 7th Prix Du Polar Europeen Du Point, and the Mystery Booksellers of America Dilys Award. It went on to win the Inaugural Roman Noir Nouvel Observateur Prize in 2009, the Best Thriller 2009 by New York's Strand Magazine, along with the Prix des Libraires Du Quebec 2009, the Livre De Poche Award, the Southern Independent Booksellers' Award 2010, the Quebec Booksellers' Prize, and the USA National Indie Excellence Award 2010 for Best Mystery.

In 2010, A Quiet Vendetta won the Prix Des Libraires Du Quebec. Additionally, it won the Villeneuve les Avignon Literary Festival Readers' Prize in 2010 and the St. Maur Prix Polar in 2011.

A Simple Act of Violence was shortlisted for the Barry Award for Best British Crime Fiction 2009 and won the Theakston's Old Peculier Crime Novel of the Year Award for 2010.

Les Assassins (The Anniversary Man) won the Plume d'Or 2016 for Thriller Internationale.

Chant de l'Assassin (Mockingbird Songs) won the Grand Prix des Blogueurs Littéraires 2021.

The Bell Tower was shortlisted for the UK Crime Writers Association Gold Dagger 2025.

Au Nord de la Frontière (The Last Highway) won Best Thriller at the Créteil International Festival of Books 2025.

Everglades (The Bell Tower) won Grand Prix des Lecteurs (La Ruche des Mots) 2025

== Works ==
- Candlemoth (2003) ISBN 0-7528-5666-9
- Ghostheart (2004) ISBN 0-7528-6059-3
- A Quiet Vendetta (2005) ISBN 0-7528-6060-7
- City of Lies (2006) ISBN 0-7528-7366-0
- A Quiet Belief in Angels (2007) ISBN 978-0-7528-7369-5
- A Simple Act of Violence (2008) ISBN 978-0-7528-9190-3
- The Anniversary Man (2009) ISBN 0-7528-9874-4
- Saints of New York (2010) ISBN 978-1-4091-0474-2
- Bad Signs (2011) ISBN 978-1-4091-0476-6
- A Dark and Broken Heart (2012) ISBN 978-1-4091-2414-6
- Three Days in Chicagoland Trilogy (2012)
- The Sister ISBN 978-1-4091-4435-9
- The Cop ISBN 978-1-4091-4436-6
- The Killer ISBN 978-1-4091-4437-3
- The Devil and the River (2013) ISBN 978-1-4091-2417-7
- Carnival of Shadows (2014) ISBN 978-1-4091-2420-7
- Mockingbird Songs (2015) ISBN 978-1-409-1-2423-8
- Chicagoland (2015) with Fabrice Colin & Sacha Goerg ISBN 978-2-756-0-6310-2
- Kings of America (2017) ISBN 978-1-4091-6862-1
- Three Bullets (2019) ISBN 978-1-4091-8778-3
- The Actor's Playbook (2020) ISBN 978-1-5272-5914-0
- The Man Who Ate The World (2020) ISBN 979-8-6423-9791-6 (All proceeds to charity)
- Proof of Life (2021) ISBN 978-1-4091-9856-7
- Seul le Silence (2021) with Fabrice Colin and Richard Guérineau ISBN 978-2-4914-6711-1
- The Darkest Season (2022) ISBN 978-1-4091-9860-4
- The Actor's Playbook (Second Edition) (2022) ISBN 978-1-3999-2370-5
- The Last Highway (2023) ISBN 978-1-3987-1034-4
- The Bell Tower (2024) ISBN 978-1-3987-1038-2
- A Darker Side of Paradise (2025) ISBN 978-13987-2400-6
- Vendetta (2025) with Fabrice Colin and Bartolomé Segui ISBN 978-24914-6764-7
- The House of Falling Light (2026) ISBN 978-13987-2405-1
- L'écharpe jaune (2026) ISBN 979-10985-5354-7 (French edition only)
