= The Treatment (novel) =

Book by Mo Hayder

- Author: Mo Hayder
- Language: English
- Series: Jack Caffery #2
- Genre: Thriller
- Publisher: Bantam Books
- Publication date: 4 June 2001
- Publication place: UK
- Media type: Print (hardcover)
- Pages: 397pp
- ISBN: 0-593-04542-4
- OCLC: 59538678
- Preceded by: Birdman
- Followed by: Tokyo

The Treatment is a 2001 novel by British crime-writer Mo Hayder. The novel is based around the theme of pedophilia. It features her protagonist DI Jack Caffery.

== Plot ==
A husband and wife are discovered imprisoned in their own home near Brockwell Park in South London. It is a hot summer and they are badly dehydrated. They have been bound and beaten, and the husband seems close to death. Rory Peach, their 8-year-old son, is missing. Detective Inspector (DI) Jack Caffery is one of the police team. The disappearance of the boy rekindles memories in Caffery of his brother Ewan, who was abducted as a 9-year-old and never seen again.

Caffery tries to find the boy at the same time as helping his girlfriend cope with having been sexually assaulted. He follows clues that might allow him to find out Ewan's fate. Patterns of child sexual abuse start to emerge, and Caffery tracks down a young man who was abused in the same park many years earlier as a child. Caffery is convinced that the attacker will be targeting another family. Rory's body is discovered, with evidence of sexual attack, but the DNA from semen is found to be that of Rory's father Alek. The case is turned on its head, and confusion is added when bite marks on the boy's shoulder do not match Alek's dental pattern. Caffery understands that Peach was forced to sodomise his son.

Another family with a young boy, 8-year-old Josh, has been imprisoned. Caffery slowly pieces together the clues to find out who they are. He gets very close to discovering that his brother is still alive, having suffered brain damage at the hands of a child molester. He was a member of a paedophile ring, who groomed children for abuse by adults and made child pornography videos.

== Film version ==
The novel was made into film by Belgian director Hans Herbots with the title De Behandeling (international title: The Treatment) in 2014.

== Reception ==
Peter Guttridge of The Observer described it as "a bleak, powerful story of child abuse". Maxim Jakubowski of The Guardian said it was one of the best offerings of the month, and "Books don't get any harsher about the rotten core of humanity". In 2002 it won the WH Smith Thumping Great Read Award.
