= The Ink Black Heart =

2022 crime fiction novel by J. K. Rowling

- UK first edition cover
- Author: Robert Galbraith (J. K. Rowling)
- Language: English
- Genre: Crime fiction
- Publisher: Sphere Books
- Publication date: 30 August 2022
- Publication place: United Kingdom
- Pages: 1,024
- ISBN: 978-0-7515-8420-2
- Preceded by: Troubled Blood
- Followed by: The Running Grave

The Ink Black Heart is a crime novel written by British author J. K. Rowling, published under the pseudonym Robert Galbraith. It was released on 30 August 2022. It is the sixth and longest novel in the Cormoran Strike series.

== Plot ==
After Strike and Robin visit The Ritz for Robin's 30th birthday, Strike attempts to kiss Robin; she evades the kiss. Feeling rebuffed, Strike starts a relationship with Madeline, an acquaintance of his ex-fiancée Charlotte, a relationship he keeps secret from Robin.

Edie Ledwell, an animator who co-created the successful cartoon The Ink Black Heart on YouTube, now being adapted into a film on Netflix, visits the agency. She asks Robin to investigate the identity of Anomie, who co-created Drek's Game, an online game based on the cartoon, and who started harassing Edie on social media after she criticised the game. Robin refers Edie to another agency with more cybercrime experience. Within the game's chat channels, two moderators appear to have a dossier of proof that Anomie and Edie are the same person. They share this with Josh Blay, the other co-creator of The Ink Black Heart and Edie's ex-boyfriend. Soon afterwards, Edie then Josh are tasered and stabbed before meeting in Highgate Cemetery, the cartoon's setting. Edie dies while Josh is paralysed.

The agency is hired to investigate Anomie's identity by a film producer seeking to adapt The Ink Black Heart. They investigate various individuals associated with the cartoon and the North Grove Art Collective. Much of the investigation takes place online with the detectives investigating Anomie's abuse and another figure, The Pen of Justice, who accused the cartoon of being racist, ableist, and transphobic. They also investigate Drek's Game, where Anomie openly confesses to the murder, something treated as a joke by the other moderators, including its co-creator Morehouse. Two moderators appear to be associated with the Halvening, the far-right group that compiled the dossier with fake proof and the police suspect committed the murder. Robin accesses the game and becomes an active player. Robin and Strike attempt to eliminate suspects by carrying out surveillance and examining who is otherwise engaged while Anomie is active in the game. They also receive phone calls telling them to exhume Edie's grave and open letters buried with her. In the game, Paperwhite, another moderator, and Morehouse appear to have a relationship, with Paperwhite sending a racy picture to Morehouse and including Anomie by accident.

After leaving a fan convention, where she interviewed Yasmin, the former employee of Edie and Josh, Robin joins Strike to follow a suspicious individual to a station. A man dressed as Batman pushes the target onto the tracks as a train approaches. Robin helps save his life and her photograph appears in the newspapers. It is revealed that she saved Oliver Peach, the moderator Vilepechora in Drek's Game and member of the Halvening. In the game, Anomie confesses this crime to Oliver's brother Charlie, alias LordDrek, before banning him from the game. Soon after, a parcel bomb damages Strike's office, but no one is injured. The publicity causes Morehouse to discuss going to the agency with Paperwhite. Robin is able to speak to the moderator Fiendy1 on a personal level and discovers she is Edie's cousin. She is able to provide Morehouse's identity and Strike and Robin decide to interview him, but Morehouse is murdered before they reach him.

Strike interviews Yasmin himself and discovers that she was being blackmailed by Anomie to login as them on several occasions, rendering much of their work to eliminate suspects moot. Robin also receives the picture that was supposedly sent by Paperwhite to Anomie and is able to identify the girl as a Glasgow art student, who denies any connection to the game or cartoon. They then figure out Paperwhite was a sock puppet account controlled by Anomie to keep tabs on Morehouse and the other moderators. She then receives a phone call, threatening to kill her. Strike realises that Edie's uncle did not bury Josh's goodbye letter with Edie. After reading misogynistic abuse in the letter, they deduce someone with access to Katya, Josh's agent, replaced the original letter.

Soon afterwards, Katya's daughter calls them, screaming for help and they drive to Katya's house where Gus, Katya's son, now revealed as Anomie, tasers and stabs Strike. Robin sets off a rape alarm before fleeing upstairs, where she sees Gus's father's corpse. A machete-wielding Gus pursues her until he is distracted by neighbours alerted by Robin's alarm, allowing her to hit him in the back of the head.

In hospital afterwards, Strike tells Robin that her name has been added to the office door, which brings her to tears, and that he has broken up with Madeline. Robin, who believed he was still dating Madeline, reveals she has agreed to a date with a police officer, Ryan Murphy. After she leaves, Strike reflects that he may have missed his chance to date Robin.

== Characters ==
=== Main ===
- Cormoran Strike – A private detective. He is a minor celebrity, thanks in part to his rock star father and his solving of high-profile murders. He is also a war veteran who lost his leg in an explosion. Throughout the book, Strike suffers extreme pain in his stump due to weight-gain as a result of his unhealthy lifestyle, forcing him to diet. The pain he suffers in his hamstring ultimately forces him to substitute his prosthetic leg with a pair of crutches, hindering his movement in the denouement and forcing Robin to handle things on her own.
- Robin Ellacott – Strike's former assistant, now business partner, trained in criminal investigation. She is a survivor of a rape and attempted murder and repeatedly suffers unwanted male attention, causing her to suffer occasional paranoia.

=== Recurring ===
- Pat Chauncey – The agency's office manager, a chain-smoker.
- Sam Barclay – An excellent Scottish contract investigator
- Charlotte Campbell Ross – Strike's neurotic and narcissistic ex-fiancee, a beautiful socialite and supermodel.
- Jago Ross: Charlotte's new husband, a violently angry man who is abusive to his daughters.
- Michelle "Midge" Greenstreet – A contract investigator who is excellent at baking.
- Dev Shah – A contract investigator
- Madeline Courson-Miles – Strike's new girlfriend, who proves almost as needy and unstable as Charlotte.
- Lucy – Strike's half sister with three sons, Strike is fond of the middle son, Jack

=== Offline characters ===
- Edie Ledwell – Co-creator of The Ink Black Heart, a successful cartoon started on YouTube and about to be made into a film. She is abused online by Anomie and other fans before her murder and is also falsely accused of being racist, ableist and transphobic by the Pen of Justice.
- Josh Blay – The former boyfriend of Ledwell who was the other co-creator of The Ink Black Heart. Although he was stabbed in the neck by Anomie whilst attempting to protect Edie in Highgate Cemetery, leaving him paralysed, he lives and does not receive the same online abuse as Edie.
- Grant Ledwell – Edie's wealthy, drunken uncle who wishes to carry on Edie's desire to create a movie version of The Ink Black Heart after her death for purposes of financial gain.
- Rachel Ledwell – Grant's daughter and cousin to Edie. She is the moderator Fiendy1 in Drek's Game and is able to provide vital information to Robin on who the co-creator Morehouse is.
- Seb Montgomery – An animator on the first few episodes of The Ink Black Heart who Edie suspects of being Anomie.
- Wally Cardew – Josh's friend who voiced Drek in The Ink Black Heart until Edie fired him over a video mocking the holocaust. He runs his own YouTube channel.
- Preston 'Pez' Pierce – A womanising digital artist who voiced Magspie in the early episodes of The Ink Black Heart and a resident of North Grove Art Collective. He models for Mariam's classes.
- Tim Ashcroft – A former actor who voiced the Worm in the early episodes of The Ink Black Heart who now runs a theatre group that works with schools. A predatory ephebophile who repeatedly grooms teenage girls online, he is revealed to be the author of the pious and hypocritical Pen of Justice blog.
- Zoe Haigh – An artist with the collective and fan of The Ink Black Heart. She is the moderator Worm28 in Drek's Game and Ashcroft's girlfriend, a victim of his psychological abuse and grooming.
- Philip Ormond – Edie's egotistical boyfriend at the time of the murder who is also collaborating with Yasmin, Edie's former employee, on a book about The Ink Black Heart.
- Yasmin Weatherhead – Former employee of Edie and Josh. She is the moderator Hartella in Drek's Game and is working with Phillip Ormond to write a book about the cartoon and online game. Weak-willed, gullible and cowardly, she is effortlessly manipulated by members of a far-right terrorist group called the Halvening. Anomie is able to keep her quiet by threatening her with going to the police about her interactions with members of the Halvening.
- Nils de Jong and Mariam Torosyan – Owners of the North Grove Art Collective, the establishment where Edie, Josh, Tim, Katya and the rest of the people associated with The Ink Black Heart met.
- Bram de Jong – Nil's brilliant but mentally disturbed and voyeuristic young son.
- Kea Niven – Chronically ill former girlfriend of Josh who claims Edie stole her idea for The Ink Black Heart.
- Katya Upcott – Josh's agent and Edie's former agent.
- Inigo Upcott – Katya's husband, a gifted musician forced to retire due to myalgic encephalomyelitis. Self-centered and belligerent, he is emotionally and psychologically abusive to his wife on whom he cheats compulsively, and to his son Gus. Inigo attempts to vicariously live his dreams of being a famous musician by forcing Gus to endlessly practise the cello.
- Gus Upcott – Katya and Inigo's adult son, a gifted musician who is bullied by his father.
- Flavia Upcott – Katya and Inigo's highly intelligent 12 year old daughter. She is treated poorly by both parents and is instrumental in helping Strike and Robin solve the case.
- Ryan Murphy – Benign local CID officer called to the agency for Robin's account of her meeting with Edie Ledwell. He develops a romantic interest in Robin.

=== Online characters ===
The book presents multiple logs of chat rooms, sometimes showing several simultaneous conversations on different channels side-by-side.

- Anomie – A co-creator and moderator of Drek's Game, who persecutes Edie after a video is released in which she said she did not like the game. A vindictive misogynist and an obsessive, controlling bully, he is ultimately driven to murder Edie Ledwell and attempt to murder, though he paralyzes, Josh Blay. Later attempts to murder Oliver Peach, who had told him how to purchase the machete he used to stab Ledwell and Blay, in order to cover his tracks. He goes on to murder his fellow co-creator, Bhardwaj, for planning to reveal that he is Gus Upcott.
- Morehouse – A co-creator and moderator of Drek's Game, and the online identity of Dr. Vikas Bhardwaj. Unlike Anomie, he does not attack Edie online.
- Vilepechora and LordDrek – Oliver and Charlie Peach, members of the Halvening and moderators who compile a dossier purporting to prove Anomie is Edie prior to her death. They provide this dossier to Hartella.
- Paperwhite – A female moderator who is in an online relationship with Morehouse but is later revealed to be a fake account of Anomie.
- Fiendy1 – A moderator who believes Anomie is dangerous and later agrees to speak with Robin.
- Hartella – A moderator who claims to have proof Edie is Anomie, but was in reality being manipulated by members of the Halvening. She later admits to Strike she would pretend to be Anomie on his orders.
- Worm28 – A moderator of Drek's Game who struggles with dyslexia.

== Reception ==
The Ink Black Heart sold 50,738 copies in its first week on sale in the UK, placing it first on the UK Official Top 50 book sales list.

Jake Kerridge from The Daily Telegraph rated the book 3 out of 5 stars, describing the series as a whole as "good comforting crime fiction", but criticising The Ink Black Heart for its length, stating it "[does not] seem to have more depth, or to cover more emotional territory, than the earlier ones did". The author Mark Sanderson, writing in The Times, similarly criticised the length.

Kirkus Reviews called the book "[a]n overblown whodunit", citing length and extensive focus on online conversations as reasons to skip it. They concluded the review by saying "[a]fter a thousand pages ... the reader is likely to no longer care" who the murderer is. Darragh McManus from Irish Independent gave the book a positive review, praising it for "dozens of characters, multiple plotlines and, most crucially, lots and lots of things going on".

The plot, in which a woman is killed after being accused of various prejudices, particularly transphobia, drew comparisons to Rowling's real-life previous controversial comments surrounding transgender people, leading to allegations of self-insertion. Rowling denied the claims that the book was inspired by her own controversies, stating, "I had written the book before certain things happened to me online".

The book was shortlisted for the 2023 CWA Ian Fleming Steel Dagger.

== Adaptation ==
The Ink Black Heart has been adapted as the four-part, 2024 installment, of the Strike television series starring Tom Burke as Cormoran Strike and Holliday Grainger as Robin Ellacott.
