= Pig Island (novel) =

2006 novel by Mo Hayder

- First edition
- Author: Mo Hayder
- Language: English
- Genre: Thriller novel
- Publisher: Bantam Books
- Publication date: 3 April 2006
- Publication place: United Kingdom
- Media type: Print (Paperback)
- Pages: 352 pp
- ISBN: 0-593-04971-3
- OCLC: 62760988
- Preceded by: Tokyo
- Followed by: Throwing the Bones

Pig Island is a 2006 novel by British writer Mo Hayder. The novel is nominally a thriller which mixes elements of the detective novel with more overt horror influences. It reached number 8 on the Sunday Times bestseller lists, the author's highest position to date.

== Style ==
Darrell Squires of The Western Star said that the "use of dark and heavy atmosphere creates an almost crushing sense of dread and ennui", but that the main character's "style of telling the story is slangy, sometimes a little too casual and flippant".

== Plot ==
Joe Oakes is a journalist famous for his ability to dismantle supernatural events linked above all to the so-called "gurus". After the appearance of an amateur video that for a moment shows a figure in the distance with human features but with a demonic tail on the so-called Isle of Pigs in Scotland, Joe receives an invitation from the new leader of the local sect to visit their community and to write an article about their religion.

== Critical reception ==
Peter Guttridge of The Guardian said that this novel, in comparison to Hayder's previous novels, "has moved into disturbing territory around sex that makes Tod Browning's Freaks seem like a Doris Day movie" and that Hayder shows the "commitment she brings to her neo-gothic horror tale". Entertainment Weekly reviewer, Jennifer Reese, gave it a "B−", saying that "this novel is merely creepy, a skin-crawling cross between The Last Seduction and Splash." A Montreal Gazette reviewer said that "it is the almost languid pace of the horror that is unsettling" and that "the ending is sudden, shocking and splendid".
