= Mo Hayder =

British author (1962–2021)

- Born: Clare Damaris Bastin; 2 January 1962; Epping, Essex, England
- Died: 27 July 2021 (aged 59); Cheltenham, England
- Education: The American University; Bath Spa University
- Occupations: Novelist; actress; model
- Spouses: Gary Olsen (m. 1985; div. 1990) Bob Randall (m. 2021)
- Children: 1
- Writing career
- Pen name: Candy Davis (acting name); Mo Hayder; Theo Clare
- Years active: 1982–2021
- Genres: Crime; thriller
- Notable works: Birdman; The Treatment; Pig Island
- Notable awards: Edgar Award (2012)

Beatrice Clare Dunkel (born Clare Damaris Bastin; pen names, Mo Hayder and Theo Clare; 2 January 1962 – 27 July 2021) was a British author. Earlier in her life she worked as an actress and model under the name Candy Davis and appeared as Miss Belfridge in the BBC sitcom Are You Being Served? for two series. She went on to write novels as Mo Hayder. She won an Edgar Award in 2012.

Her novels have sold more than 6.5 million copies, as of 2021.

== Early life ==
Born in Epping, Essex on 2 January 1962, Hayder grew up in Loughton as the daughter of John Bastin, an astrophysicist, and Susan Hollins (née Jacobsen), a teacher. She had a younger brother, Richard. She left school and home for London shortly before her 16th birthday. Hayder was educated at The American University and Bath Spa University.

== Acting and modelling career ==
As Candy Davis, she won the Miss Nude beauty pageant in 1982 and became a Page 3 model. A likely source of this pseudonym is that the name 'Candy Davis' was used in season 2 episode 19 of the Beverly Hillbillies for an attractive secretary, played by Susan Hart. As an actress, her first credit was as a stripper in an episode of Minder. She played secretary Miss Belfridge in the BBC sitcom Are You Being Served? in the final two series from 1983 to 1985. She also appeared in the music video for the ABC song "Poison Arrow".

After a brief marriage to Gary Olsen she emigrated, aged 25, to Japan where she became a teacher of English as a foreign language in Tokyo. She was also a waitress at a nightclub and an amateur filmmaker.

== Writing career ==
Hayder sent the manuscript of her first book to several agents. To her surprise she was accepted by leading literary agent Jane Gregory who secured her an offer of nearly £200,000 from Transworld Publishers for a two-book deal. Patrick Janson-Smith of Transworld described the manuscript at the 1998 Frankfurt Book Fair as one of the most powerful and violent books he had come across, "a completely gripping story with believable characters". This debut novel, Birdman, was published in December 1999 and was an international bestseller. Her second novel, The Treatment, was a Sunday Times bestseller and won the 2002 WH Smith Thumping Good Read Award.

Her third novel, Tokyo, was published in May 2004 and was another Sunday Times bestseller. Tokyo was published as The Devil of Nanking in the United States in March 2005. Pig Island was her fourth best seller, published in April 2006. Pig Island was nominated for both a Barry Award for Best British crime novel, and a CWA dagger. Her fifth book, Ritual was the first in "The Walking Man" series, and was nominated for CWA Ian Fleming Steel Dagger award. Skin is the second book in The Walking Man series, and was released in early 2009. Gone, the third book in the series, was released in February 2011. Gone won the Edgar Award for Best Novel. Her novel Hanging Hill was published 2011, Poppet in 2013, and Wolf in 2014.

Her novels were controversial when published. Birdman was seen as violent and disturbing. Her second novel, The Treatment tackled themes of paedophilia. The San Francisco Chronicle called the novel a "disturbing journey into the pedophile mind".

Hayder also wrote the screenplay for De Behandeling (2014) which was a Belgian film adaptation of The Treatment. A sequel Ritueel followed in 2022, based on The Ritual. A television adaptation of Wolf was made for the BBC in 2023.

Shortly before her death, she completed a new novel, The Book of Sand, a speculative thriller written under the pseudonym Theo Clare, which was published in 2022.

== Personal life ==
In 1985, she married actor Gary Olsen. The couple divorced in 1990.

Hayder lived in Cheltenham, England with her second husband, Bob Randall, a retired police sergeant whom she married in 2021. She had one daughter.

She died on 27 July 2021 from complications of motor neuron disease, aged 59, having been diagnosed in December 2020.

== Bibliography ==
=== Jack Caffery series ===
- Birdman (2000)
- The Treatment (2001)
- Ritual (2008)
- Skin (2009)
- Gone (2010)
- Poppet (2013)
- Wolf (2014)

=== Stand-alone novels ===
- Tokyo (2004), also published as The Devil of Nanking (2010)
- Pig Island (2006)
- Hanging Hill (2011)
- Bonehead (2024)

=== Writing as Theo Clare ===
- The Book of Sand (2022)

== Filmography ==
=== Television ===
Year	Title	Role	Notes
1982	Minder	Stripper	Episode: "Rembrandt Doesn't Live Here Anymore"
1983	The Benny Hill Show	Hill's Angel	
1983	Comic Strip Presents	Janie	Episode: "Five Go Mad on Mescalin"
1983–1985	Are You Being Served?	Miss Belfridge	Regular role; 13 episodes
1983; 1985–1986	The Two Ronnies	Various roles	4 episodes
1984	Bottle Boys	Deirdre	Episode: "Here Comes the Groom"
1984	Cannon and Ball	Herself	1 episode

=== Film ===
Year	Title	Character	Notes
1983	Fanny Hill	Girl in bed	Uncredited
1985	Underworld	Barmaid	
