= Gone (Hayder novel) =

2010 book by Mo Hayder

- First edition
- Author: Mo Hayder
- Genre: Mystery, Thriller
- Published: 2010
- Publisher: Bantam Books (UK), Grove Atlantic (US)
- Pages: 416
- Awards: Edgar Award for Best Novel (2012)
- ISBN: 978-0-593-06382-8

Gone is a 2010 crime novel by British author Mo Hayder. It was first published in the United Kingdom by Bantam Books on 4 February 2010, and later in the United States by Grove Atlantic in February 2011. It won the Edgar Award for Best Novel in 2012.

== Synopsis ==
When a carjacker drives off with a child in the back seat, detective inspector Jack Caffery realizes that the child was the criminal's true target.
