= Tokyo (novel) =

2004 novel by Mo Hayder

- First edition
- Author: Mo Hayder
- Language: English
- Genre: Thriller novel
- Publisher: Bantam Press
- Publication date: 4 May 2004
- Publication place: United Kingdom
- Media type: Print (hardback & paperback)
- Pages: 409 pp
- ISBN: 0-593-04969-1
- OCLC: 56476730
- Dewey Decimal: 823.914 22
- LC Class: PR6058.A9776 T65 2004
- Preceded by: The Treatment
- Followed by: Pig Island

Tokyo is a 2004 novel by British crime writer Mo Hayder. It was short-listed for the Crime Writers' Association Gold Dagger award, as well as several others. (For the US market, the title was changed to The Devil of Nanking, which had been Hayder's working-title for the book.) Tokyo was reviewed by the internationally read UK newspaper, The Guardian as well as by Kirkus Reviews under its US title.

== Plot introduction ==
The story is about a young woman (nicknamed 'Grey' by a fellow mental hospital patient) who is obsessed with the 1937 Japanese invasion of Nanjing, which resulted in the Rape of Nanjing. She travels to Japan in order to find a professor said to have rare footage of the massacre detailing an event that she could not otherwise prove occurred. The professor decides that he will only show her the tape if she was to procure an unknown ingredient of Chinese medicine from the local yakuza group. After being recruited into a host club, Grey finds her chance.

== Major themes ==
The book deals with the evils of ignorance, Grey being a home-schooled child whose mother heavily censored everything she came into contact with, the politics of modern-day yakuza, and the glitzy underground night-life of Tokyo, as well as the build-up and reality of the Rape of Nanking and the effect it still has today.
