= Lucretia Grindle =

American author of mystery fiction (born 1960)

- Born: Lucretia Walsh Grindle; May 10, 1960 (age 66); Boston, Massachusetts, U.S.
- Education: Dartmouth College (BA); University of Oxford
- Occupation: Author
- Spouse: David Lutyens
- Parent(s): Paul Davidson Grindle; Patricia Walsh
- Writing career
- Genre: Mystery fiction

Lucretia Walsh Grindle (born May 10, 1960) is an American author of mystery fiction. She is signed to Macmillan Publishers.

== Early life ==
Lucretia Grindle is one of four children of newspaper reporter turned entrepreneur Paul Davidson Grindle and his wife Patricia née Walsh. She has a sister and two brothers. She was born in Boston MA, and spent her formative years living with her family either at her parents' American home in Sherborn, Massachusetts, or at their British home in the village of Benenden in Kent. Her mother, who was born on the Apache Reservation below Jerome, Arizona, and who before her marriage was the head show girl at Ringling Brother's and Barnum and Bailey circus where she was the first woman to feature and solo in a mixed act of large cats, was the director of the Moat House Riding Academy also in Benenden. Grindle attended school in both the US and UK, and was a Senior Fellow and graduated with a BA in religion from Dartmouth College. She subsequently studied Theology and Philosophy at Oxford University. On leaving Oxford she worked in London as a freelance journalist specializing in World War II Intelligence and "feature length profile work and sport" – in the US, UK and Canada. She later owned, trained, and competed in the equestrian sport of Three Day Eventing, working with the US Equestrian Team's Young Riders Program throughout the 1990s, and with the Canadian Equestrian Federation through the Atlanta Olympics and European and World Games.

== Writing career ==
Grindle's first two published novels, the Pocket Books-issued The Killing of Ellis Martin (1993, short listed for the Agatha Award for Best first novel) and So Little to Die For (1994), both featured elements of the cozy mystery genre and had a common central character in British police inspector H. W. Ross. Later recalling the first phase of her career as a novelist Grindle would remember writing "two books for every one that was published", Her third published novel appeared 2003 when she made her hardcover debut with the psychological suspense novel The Nightspinners which was shortlisted for the Silver Dagger awarded by the CWA.

The Faces of Angels, published in the UK in 2006 and cited by BBC Radio 4's Front Row as one of the six best thrillers of the year as well as being shortlisted for the Edgar Awards in the US, was the first of three novels by Grindle to combine elements of psychological suspense with the police procedural genre in an Italian setting, having a common character in Florentine Ispettore Alessandro Pallioti. Two followup novels, both based on historical fact, featured the additional dimension of "interweaving modern plots with story lines set [at] critical moments in Italian 20th century history. The Villa Triste, shortlisted for The CWA Gold Dagger Award, is set in Florence in 1943, and follows the lives of two sisters involved in the partisan resistance to Nazi occupation. The Lost Daughter is based on the kidnapping and murder of Italian politician and former Prime Minister Aldo Moro in 1978."

Grindle's choice of Florence as her preferred literary locale is the result of many trips she and her husband made to Italy in the wake of the September 11 attacks. Grindle recalled that immediately after September 11, she and her husband had a discussion about "what they would choose to do if the world was going to fly to pieces." "I had never been to the Uffizi," she said. " So I thought, if World War III is going to break out, let's be in Florence."

In 2012, Grindle made the decision to move away from the crime genre. In 2013, she returned to graduate school in the UK. In 2014 she received an MA with Distinction in biography and non-fiction from the University of East Anglia, where she won the Laura Sage Award for her memoir, FireFlies, which was subsequently re-worked into the novel, The Burning. In 2016 she began a PhD in history at the University of Maine, where she was a fellow at the Canadian-American Center. Her research focuses on the borderlands of the 19th-century Canadian and American Wests with a special interest in the history of the North West Mounted Police's relations with the plains tribes, especially the Lakota. In 2019, she started the history-travel blog, JourneyThruHistory, which concentrates on popular British history and its connection to both people and place. Her latest historical novel, The Devil's Glove, was published May 1, 2023 by Casa Croce Press. Set in 1688, The Devil's Glove is the first of a trilogy centered around The Salem Witchcraft Trials.

== Personal life ==
Grindle was married to David Lutyens (deceased). Having previously lived in the UK, first in Cornwall and then on the northern edge of Dartmoor in Devon, they would split their time between her father's family home in Maine, and Shropshire, home of her husband's family. In May 2024, Lucretia wrote about this in The Guardian.
