= Aaron B. Rollins =

American politician

New York State Assembly
- In office 1851–1853

Deputy Sheriff of New York County, New York
- In office 1853–1859

Coroner of New York City
- In office 1867–1870

Personal details
- Born: 1818 New York, United States
- Died: December 4, 1878 Manhattan, New York City, United States

Aaron B. Rollins (1818 – December 4, 1878) was a member of the New York State Assembly for the 9th district of Manhattan from 1851 to 1853. He was the deputy Sheriff of New York County, New York, from 1853 to 1859, and the Coroner of New York County, New York, from 1867 to 1870.

== Biography ==
He was born in 1818 in New York.

He was first employed by a drug store in Brooklyn, and later became the owner of the shop. In 1851 he was elected to the New York State Assembly for the Ninth District.

In 1853 he was appointed as a Deputy Sheriff, occupying the office for a total of six years. During this time he gave up the drug business and devoted himself entirely to political affairs. Between 1860 and 1864, he was Water Purveyor for the Croton Aqueduct.

In 1867 he was elected Coroner of New York City, and served in that capacity for three years. His most important case was the murder of Benjamin Nathan on July 28, 1870.

He died on December 4, 1878, at the Union-Place Hotel in Manhattan of a heart attack. He was buried in Cypress Hills Cemetery in Brooklyn.

== Memberships ==
- The Hoboken Ancient and Honorable Order of Turtles.
