= Henry Dyer Grindle =

- Born: November 19, 1826; Maine, US
- Died: September 14, 1902 (aged 75); New York, US
- Occupation: Physician
- Spouse: Julia A. Lockwood (1837–1900) (m. 1848–1900)
- Children: Minnie Grindle Grey (1862–1938); John Wesley Grindle

Henry Dyer Grindle (November 19, 1826 – September 14, 1902) was an American physician and abortion provider in the 1870s who worked under the name H.D. Grindle.

== Birth ==
He was born on November 19, 1826, in Maine. He married Mary Babbage in Maine on 20 May 1848, in Penobscot, and they had two children: Flora E. Grindle (c1849–1866); and Priscilla Herrick Grindle (1851–1924). He graduated from University Medical College in 1867. He married Julia A. Lockwood (1837–1900) of Connecticut. She also worked as a physician and was known as "Madame Grindle" and they had a child, Minnie Grindle (1862–1938) who would later marry Alonzo Grey, a physician; and John Wesley Grindle.

== First indictment ==
On August 27, 1868, Susannah Lattin died post-partum at his illegal abortion and adoption clinic at 6 Amity Place (now West Third Street) in New York City. Her death led to an investigation which resulted in regulation of abortion clinics and adoptions in New York City. Grindle was indicted for "performing an abortion" on Lattin. The trial ended in his acquittal with only a censure from the judge because the prosecution proved only that the woman died at his institute during childbirth and not during, or because of, an abortion.

== The Evil of the Age ==
On August 23, 1871, The New York Times ran the following investigative report by Augustus St. Clair:

- Ladies' Physician. – Dr. H.D. Grindle, professor of midwifery, twenty-five years successful practice in this City, guarantees certain relief to ladies in trouble, with or without medicine; sure relief to the most anxious patient at one interview; elegant rooms for ladies requiring nursing.
- Madame Grindle, Female Physician, guarantees relief to all female complaints; pleasant rooms for nursing.

The forgoing advertisement has for a long time appeared in the columns of the New York Herald and other papers. The history of these two worthies is peculiar. The male member of the firm, if report is correct, knows much more of shoe-making than of medicine. His verbose circular ostentatiously announces him as a "member of the New-York University," with twenty-five years experience. His diploma is said to have been obtained but four years ago from a New York Medical college at considerable expense. The nature of this occupation is sufficiently well indicated in the advertisement without the necessity of further description. He and his "Madame" transact an immense amount of business, in which they are reputed to have amassed a handsome fortune. Formerly their premises were in Amity-place, but the house becoming notorious they removed to their present locality in Twenty-sixth street, midway between Sixth and Seventh avenues. The house is of the three-story and basement style, with rear extension, and has a capacity for about twenty patients. It is appropriately surrounded by fashionable markets of infamy. A huge silver plate upon the outer door bears "Dr. Grindle's name; a sign of similar pattern, gearing the "Madame's" name, glares upon the inner door. The interior is furnished with taste and elegance. The parlors are spacious, and contain all the decorations, upholstery, cabinet-ware, piano, book-case, &c., that is [stet] found in a respectable home. A lady and gentleman who recently called there relate the following: A neat-looking lad ushered us into a parlor, and went after the "Madame." A profusion of circulars were scattered over the centre-tables, some of them being folded as if intended to be mailed. Suddenly the door opened, and the Madame entered. She is fair, fat, forty, and evidently vigorous, and keen in all her actions. She addressed us with primping care, and in a voice as smooth as the flutter of a humming-bird. "My dear friend," she said, "we can do what you hint at. I understand the case. We have had hundreds of them. Poor unfortunate women! How little the world knows how to appreciate their trials. We think it our mission to take them and save them – a noble work it is, too. But for some friendly hand like ours, how many, many blasted homes, scandalized churches and disorganized social circles there would be. Why, my dear friends, you have no idea of the class of people that come to us. We have had Senators, Congressmen and all sorts of politicians bring some of the first women in the land here. Many--very many aristocratic married women come here – or we attend them in private houses." "What are your charges, Madame?" "Three hundred dollars cover all expenses, and we see the patient through -- unless it occupies more than a week. Then we charge an extra medical fee and board money." "What about the child?" "Well, we adopt it out in good hands. One hundred dollars extra, is our fee for that." "But – if – not – a – child – what then?" A quick rolling and flash of her glittering black eyes, a sprightly nod of the head, a finger placed on the lips, a knowing look and "Sh--h!" was the pantomime [stet] reply. "We understand every branch of our business!" she exclaimed, with peculiar emphasis. She stated that a more aristocratic but expensive nursing place could be furnished in West Twenty-third-street. This place is sumptuously furnished and well kept. The best of nurses are employed. Chapters of thrilling interest could be written upon the scenes within those elegant rooms. The pale – ghastly pale and remorseful-looking countenances of the sufferers are indexes to romances in real life more startling in their stern reality than any web of fiction. How many bitter pangs, scalding tears and moans of agony were there. The most pitiful sight was that of the babes, sleeping sweetly – evidently under the influence of mild opiates. Fresh and fragrant flowers, and choice fruit were occasionally observed. How many broken hearts and shattered lives there stray points eloquently speak of. But more than that are the parting scenes between mother and child when the latter, taken away for adoption. Twenty five dollars per week is charged for board at this place.

== Second indictment ==
In 1872 Henry and Madame Grindle were indicted in New York City for abortion, but they were again found not guilty. The woman who charged them with selling her a twenty-dollar bottle of medicine to induce abortion, admitted under oath, that she had not told the couple that she was pregnant.

== Retirement ==
By 1880 he was living in Ramapo, New York. In 1884 he was elected president of the Blaine and Logan campaign club in Rockland County, New York. He died on September 14, 1902, possibly in Rockland County, New York, or Stamford, Connecticut, and he was buried in Long Ridge Union Cemetery, in Stamford, Connecticut.

== Publication ==
- An important treatise on the pathology and treatment of tuberculosis and pulmonary consumption: Also remarks upon the most effectual treatment of other obstinate chronic diseases (1885)
