= Abortion in Hawaii =

Abortion in Hawaii is legal. 66% of adults in Hawaii said in a 2014 poll by the Pew Research Center that abortion should be legal in all or most cases. The 2023 American Values Atlas reported that, in their most recent survey, 79% of people from Hawaii said that abortion should be legal in all or most cases. Hawaii began allowing abortion care de jure in 1970, the first state to do so. State law enacted at that time stated said, "the State shall not deny or interfere with a female's right to choose or obtain an abortion of a nonviable fetus or an abortion that is necessary to protect the life or health of the female."

The number of abortion clinics in the state has been declining for years. There were 15 hospitals that performed abortions in 1970, 51 clinics in 1982, 52 clinics in 1992, six in 2011, four in 2014, and three in 2017. In 2017, women in rural parts of the state had trouble accessing abortion services because of lack of clinics and costs to travel. There were 3,643 abortions in 1970, 2,147 in 2014 and 3,200 in 2017. Public funding existed for abortions for poor women using state Medicaid funding. People in Hawaii participated in the #StoptheBans movement in May 2019.

Many of the state's poor, rural women rely on Title X services that provide family planning assistance, including prenatal carry. Under Donald Trump, these dollars have been cut in Hawaii, leaving poor and rural women particularly vulnerable when it comes to the ability to access prenatal care.

== History ==
=== Legislative history ===
In March 1970, not long before the Supreme Court made their decision in Roe v. Wade, Hawaii became the first state in the US to decriminalize abortion by removing all requirements to justify having the procedure done. It was required that the abortion be performed by a licensed physician at an accredited hospital, and there was a 90-day residency requirement in place at the time, but women were not required to provide a reason they were seeking an abortion Alaska and Washington also joined Hawaii in repealing abortion that year. In 1971, the state repealed its statute that said inducing an abortion was a criminal offense. State law in 1971 required that any woman getting a legal abortion in the state needed to be a resident for some specific period between 30 and 90 days.

As of May 14, 2019, the state prohibited abortions after the fetus was viable, generally some point between week 24 and 28. This period uses a standard defined by the US Supreme Court in 1973 with the Roe v. Wade ruling. As of May 2019, state law on abortion said, "the State shall not deny or interfere with a female's right to choose or obtain an abortion of a nonviable fetus or an abortion that is necessary to protect the life or health of the female."

=== Judicial history ===
The US Supreme Court's decision in 1973's Roe v. Wade ruling meant the state could no longer regulate abortion in the first trimester. However, the Supreme Court overturned Roe v. Wade in Dobbs v. Jackson Women's Health Organization, No. 19-1392, 597 U.S. ___ (2022) later in 2022.

=== Clinic history ===
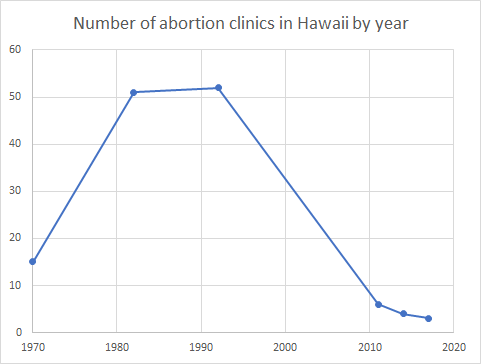
Number of abortion clinics in Hawaii by year

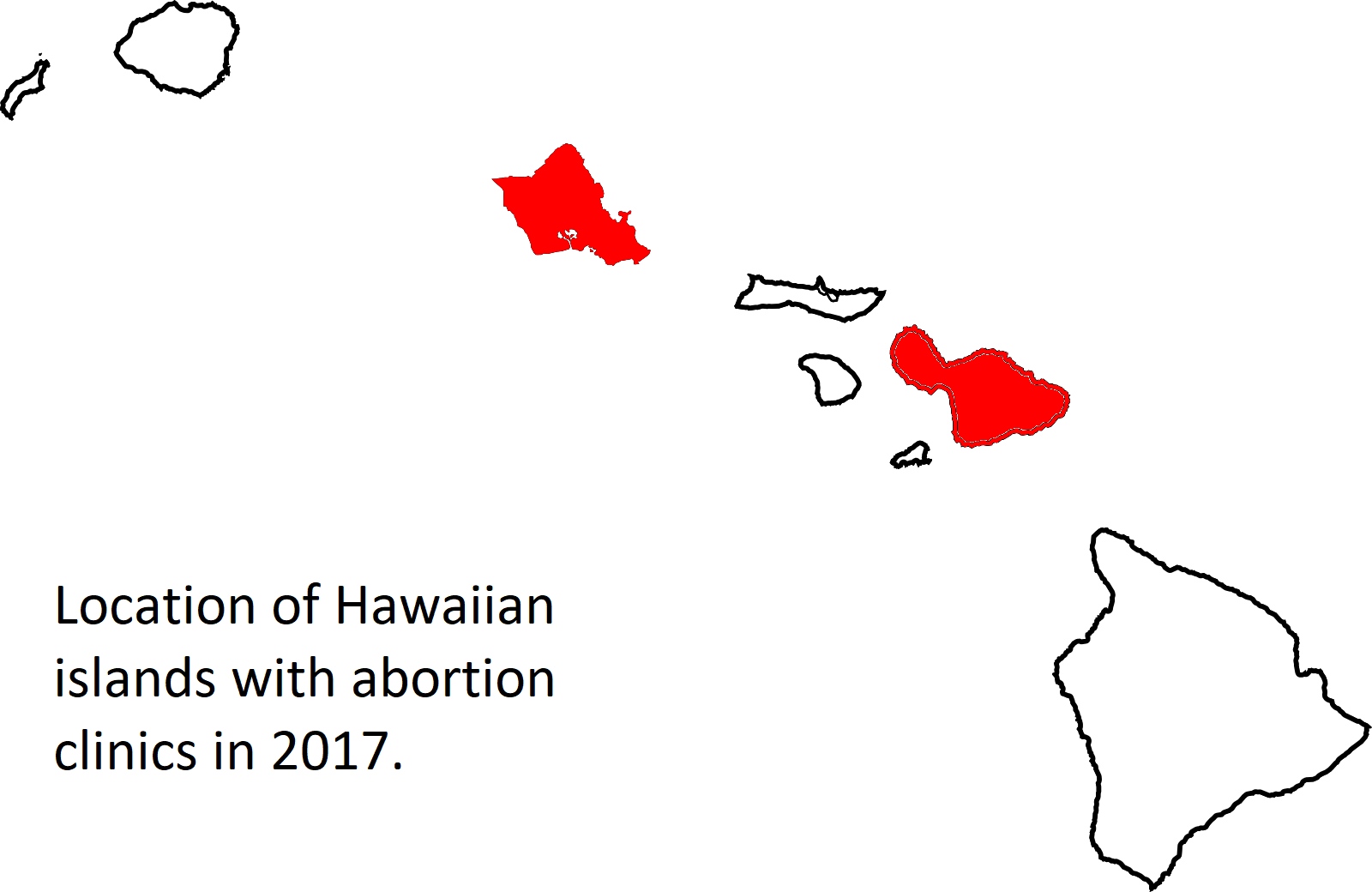
Location of Hawaiian abortion clinics by island in 2017

Abortions in 1970 were required to take place in a hospital. They cost around US$350, and 57.5% of women used personal funds or loans to cover the cost of their abortion. In 1970, the first year that abortion was legal in the state, abortions were performed at fifteen hospitals. Between 1982 and 1992, the number of abortion clinics in the state increased by one, going from 51 in 1982 to 52 in 1992. In 2011, there were only six clinics in the state, partly a result of the lack of doctors more generally in the state. In 2014, there were four abortion clinics in the state. In 2014, 40% of the counties in the state did not have an abortion clinic. That year, 5% of women in the state aged 15–44 lived in a county without an abortion clinic. By 2017, there were three abortion clinics.

In 2017, 28 facilities in Hawaii provided abortion care, with 4 of those facilities being clinics, including 2 Planned Parenthood clinics. Despite a demand on Kauai, an island of 67,000 people, there were no abortion clinics there in 2017. Of Hawaii's eight major islands, only two islands have abortion clinics.

Telehealth abortion services are currently available in Hawaii. Patients seeking a medical abortion are evaluated by a clinician using video conferencing. This service allows many women seeking abortion to avoid inter-island travel to an abortion clinic.

== Statistics ==
From March 1970 to December 1970, 3,643 abortions took place at 15 hospitals in the state, with an abortion to live birth rate of 1:45. Demographics of women seeking abortions in Hawaii that year said that 47% were white, 21% were Japanese, 10% were Hawaiian, 8.4% were Filipino, 5.0% were Chinese, 54% had never been married, 51% had never been pregnant before, 71% were in a relationship, 20% were teenagers. Outside racial demographics, the profile of women getting abortions in Hawaii in 1970 was similar to that of other women in the United States. Women getting abortions that year were more educated than the rest of women in childbearing range in the state. There were a variety of reasons these women had abortions including limiting family size or not using contraception. Some had complications, with 22.5% of the complications being cervical laceration, 19.5% being hemorrhage and 16% infection.

In 1990, 136,000 women in the state faced the risk of an unintended pregnancy. In 2013, among white women aged 15–19, there were abortions 60, 10 abortions for black women aged 15–19, 50 abortions for Hispanic women aged 15–19, and 380 abortions for women of all other races. In 2014, 66% of adults said in a poll by the Pew Research Center that abortion should be legal in all or most cases. In 2017, the state had an infant mortality rate of 5.3 deaths per 1,000 live births.

Number of reported abortions, abortion rate and percentage change in rate by geographic region and state in 2014, 2016, and 2017.
| Census division and state | Number | | | Rate | | | % change 2014–2017 |
|---|---|---|---|---|---|---|---|
| Census division and state | 2014 | 2016 | 2017 | 2014 | 2016 | 2017 | % change 2014–2017 |
| US Total | 926,190 | 874,080 | 862,320 | 25.9 | 22.9 | 22.9 | -8 |
| Alaska | 1,470 | 1,260 | 1,260 | 10.0 | 8.6 | 8.6 | -14 |
| California | 157,350 | 140,700 | 132,680 | 19.5 | 17.4 | 16.4 | -16 |
| Hawaii | 3,760 | 3,100 | 3,200 | 14.0 | 11.6 | 12.0 | -14 |
| Oregon | 9,330 | 9,850 | 9,640 | 12.0 | 12.3 | 11.9 | -1 |
| Washington | 19,230 | 17,350 | 17,740 | 13.7 | 12.1 | 12.1 | -12 |

Number, rate, and ratio of reported abortions, by reporting area of residence and occurrence and by percentage of abortions obtained by out-of-state residents, US CDC estimates
| Location | Residence | | | Occurrence | | | % obtained by out-of-state residents | Year | Ref |
|---|---|---|---|---|---|---|---|---|---|
| Location | No. | Rate^ | Ratio^^ | No. | Rate^ | Ratio^^ | % obtained by out-of-state residents | Year | Ref |
| Hawaii | | | | 12,190 | 46 | | | 1992 | |
| Hawaii | | | | 7,510 | 29.3 | | | 1995 | |
| Hawaii | | | | 6,930 | 27.3 | | | 1996 | |
| Hawaii | 2,011 | 7.5 | 108 | 2,147 | 8.0 | 116 | 0.9 | 2014 | |
| Hawaii | 2,042 | 7.6 | 111 | 2,026 | 7.6 | 110 | 0.3 | 2015 | |
| Hawaii | 2,479 | 9.3 | 137 | 2,554 | 9.6 | 141 | 1.0 | 2016 | |
^number of abortions per 1,000 women aged 15–44; ^^number of abortions per 1,000 live births

After Hawaii legalized abortion in 1970, the number of live births of children with Down syndrome decreased.

== Abortion financing ==
State Medicaid coverage of medically necessary abortion services. Medicaid covers medically necessary abortion for low-income women through legislation Medicaid covers medically necessary abortions for low-income women under court order Medicaid denies abortion coverage for low-income women except for cases of rape, incest, or life endangerment.

Seventeen states including Hawaii use their own funds to cover all or most "medically necessary" abortions sought by low-income women under Medicaid, thirteen of which are required by State court orders to do so. In 2010, the state had 1,279 publicly funded abortions, of which zero were federally and 1,279 were state funded.

Women in rural Hawaii faced huge problems getting access to abortion services in 2017. Women seeking abortions in 2017 often had to travel great distances, often paying more than $300 and take one or more days off and book accommodation, to get an abortion. This could make the total cost of an abortion over US$1,000.

== Abortion rights views and activities ==
Women from the state participated in marches supporting abortion rights as part of a #StoptheBans movement in May 2019.

Following the Roe v. Wade overturn leak on May 2, 2022, abortion rights protesters held a protest outside the District of Hawaii courthouse in Honolulu and in Waimea.
