= Improbable =

Improbable may refer to:

- Improbable (company), a British company founded in 2012
- Improbable (novel), a 2005 science fiction thriller novel by Adam Fawer
- Improbable (The X-Files), an episode in the ninth season of the science fiction television series
- Improbable (horse), a racehorse
- Improbable (theatre company), an English theatre company

== See also ==
- Probability (disambiguation)
- Probably (disambiguation)
