= Watched =

Watched may refer to:

- Watched, novel by C. J. Lyons 2014
- Watched (film), film with Stacy Keach and Harris Yulin 1974
- "Watched" (Doctors), a 2005 television episode
