= Sylvia Day =

Japanese American writer

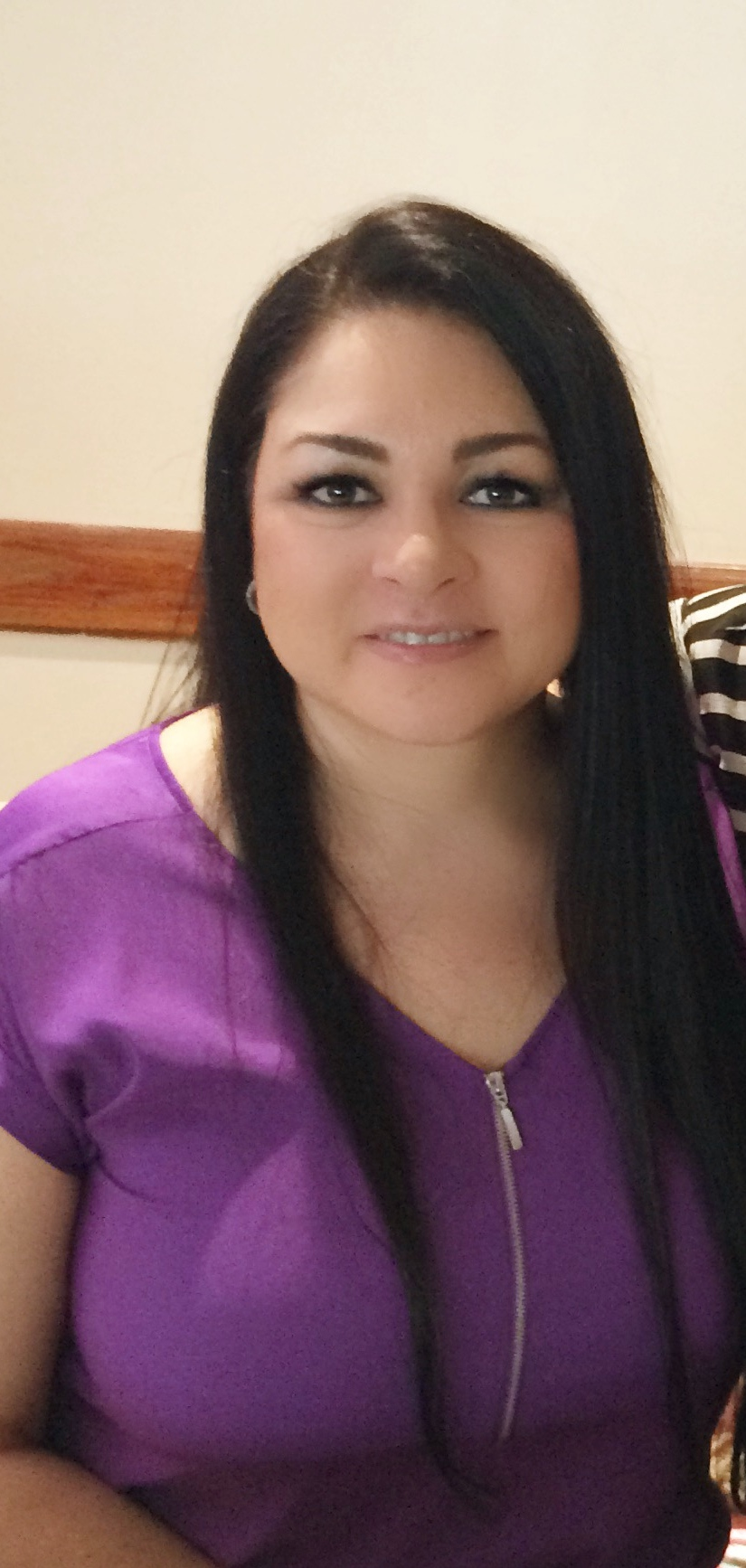
- Sylvia Day at the California Dreamin' Writers Conference in March 2015
- Born: Sylvia June Day; March 11, 1973 (age 53); Los Angeles, California, U.S.
- Occupation: Writer
- Writing career
- Pen name: S. J. Day, Livia Dare
- Period: 2004–present
- Genres: Romance, Thriller, Fantasy, Paranormal, Historical, Speculative fiction, Urban fantasy
- Notable works: Bared to You, Reflected in You, Seven Years to Sin, Afterburn / Aftershock
- Website: www.sylviaday.com

Sylvia June Day (born March 11, 1973) is a Japanese American writer. She also writes under the pseudonyms S.J. Day and Livia Dare. She is a number one bestselling author in 29 countries.

== Career ==
Day writes genre fiction and literary commentary. She has also published under the pseudonyms S. J. Day and Livia Dare.

In 2005, she co-founded Passionate Ink, the erotic romance special interest chapter of Romance Writers of America (RWA), and served as its inaugural president. Day went on to serve on RWA's Board of Directors from 2009-2013, and later as the 22nd President of RWA in 2013. Day has served on the Authors Guild Council and Authors Guild Foundation Board of Directors since 2016.

She presents workshops for writing groups and has been a speaker at events such as the RT Booklovers Convention, Romance Writers of America's National Convention, and Comic-Con.

On October 10, 2012, Amazon (company) launched Amazon Author Rank, the "definitive list of best-selling authors on Amazon.com," with Day ranking #1 overall.

In March 2013, Harlequin Enterprises and Hearst Corporation announced the signing of Day to a seven-figure contract to write two novellas to launch "Cosmo Red Hot Reads from Harlequin," a new collaboration between the publisher and communications giant.

In June 2013, Penguin USA agreed on an eight-figure deal for two more "Crossfire" books, with Penguin UK acquiring UK and Commonwealth rights for an additional seven-figures.

In January 2014, Macmillan's St. Martin's Press announced a two-book, eight-figure agreement with Day for a new "Blacklist" series. Penguin UK acquired UK and Commonwealth rights to the series for an additional seven-figures.

In April 2019, Amazon Publishing announced a deal for a new novella from Day for seven figures.

=== Crossfire ===
Day's Crossfire series has 13 million English-language copies in print and international rights licensed in over 40 territories as of January 2014.

Bared to You was selected by Amazon's editors as the #1 Best Book of the Year So Far in Romance, covering the period between January through July 2012 and ranked #4 on Amazon.com's list of top 10 best-selling books of 2012, followed by Reflected in You, which ranked #7. Bared to You ranked #5 on iTunes' Top Ten Books of the Year, and #7 on Bookscan's Top 10 Print Book Sales of 2012 – Adult Fiction. Bared to You spent forty-five weeks on The New York Times trade paperback bestseller list and sixty-seven weeks on the USA Today bestseller list.

Reflected in You was released on a staggered schedule, with the eBook releasing two weeks prior to the release of the paperback. Reflected in You sold 286,000 digital copies in its first six days on sale and debuted at #1 on The New York Times Combined Print & eBook Fiction list on digital sales alone. The paperback edition also debuted at #1 on The New York Times bestsellers list when it released.

Entwined with You sold 550,000 copies in its first six days on sale, debuting at #1 on The New York Times Combined Print & eBook fiction list, as well as #1 on the trade paperback and eBook lists.

Captivated by You debuted at #1 on the USA Today bestsellers list, outselling the book in second position by nearly 2-to-1. The fourth Crossfire novel also debuted at #1 on all three New York Times fiction bestsellers lists, as well as Publishers Weekly, The Wall Street Journal, The Washington Post, and in 16 other countries.

One with You was not only Day's fourth straight #1 bestseller in the UK, Day is also the only author to top The Bookseller's monthly eBook ranking with multiple titles. In the US, USA Today reported that One with You outsold the book in second position by over 3-to-1 take the #1 spot.

In April 2025, Day launched Ireland, the first book in the Crossroads series, an ongoing Crossfire spin-off which both continues Gideon & Eva Cross's narration of their story and introduces a dangerous love interest for Ireland Vidal, Gideon Cross's sister. Ireland was followed by Illusive in June 2026. The third book, Indelible, is scheduled to release in April 2027, with more books to follow.

== Adaptations ==
In April 2013, HeroesAndHeartbreakers.com broke the news that Day's Crossfire series had been optioned for television adaptation. Lions Gate Entertainment secured the rights. Kevin Beggs, President of the Lionsgate Television Group, confirmed the acquisition on August 5, 2013 in a press release. Lionsgate TV Executive Vice President Chris Selak, who was to oversee development for the studio, said, "The Crossfire series is an incredible property and it is a thrill to bring it to Lionsgate. Sylvia has created an enduring, sexy and edgy story, and we're looking forward to working with her to create a show that both excites and connects with audiences as her books have done." However, Day declined a third renewal of the option and the rights reverted to her. The rights were optioned a second time and reverted again. The series is presently in development with a third, as-yet-unnamed studio.

In June 2017, startup streaming entertainment company Passionflix began production of Day's Afterburn/Aftershock film adaptation. Principal photography concluded on July 29, 2017. The film debuted in November 2017.

Beyond Words: Sylvia Day, a documentary covering the world tour supporting the release of Day’s One with You, was released on October 9, 2018.

== Advocacy and Legal Actions ==
In July 2020, Day – with Lee Child, John Grisham, C. J. Lyons, Douglas Preston, Jim Rasenberger, T. J. Stiles, R L Stine, Monique Truong, Scott Turow, Nicholas Weinstock, and Stuart Woods, along with Amazon Publishing and Penguin Random House LLC – filed a lawsuit against book piracy entity KISS Library in the U.S. District Court for the Western District of Washington for selling pirated copies of their literary works. In December 2021, the court ruled in favor of the plaintiffs with a $7.8 Million dollar default judgement.

In September 2023, Day – along with David Baldacci, Mary Bly, Michael Connelly, Jonathan Franzen, John Grisham, Elin Hilderbrand, Christina Baker Kline, Maya Shanbhag Lang, Victor LaValle, George R.R. Martin, Jodi Picoult, Douglas Preston, Roxana Robinson, George Saunders, Scott Turow, Rachel Vail, and The Authors Guild – filed a lawsuit against OpenAI for "flagrant and harmful infringements of Plaintiffs’ registered copyrights in written works of fiction."

== Published works ==
=== Novels ===
- Bad Boys Ahoy! (2006)
- Ask For It (2006)
- The Stranger I Married (2007)
- Eve of Darkness (2009) w/a S.J. Day
- Eve of Destruction (2009) w/a S.J. Day
- Eve of Chaos (2009) w/a S.J. Day
- In the Flesh (2009) w/a Livia Dare
- Pride and Pleasure (2011)
- Seven Years to Sin (2011)
- A Touch of Crimson (2011)
- Bared to You (2012)
- A Hunger So Wild (2012)
- Reflected in You (2012)
- Entwined with You (2013)
- Spellbound (2013)
- Captivated by You (2014)
- One with You (2016)
- So Close (2023)
- Too Far (2023)
- Ireland (2025)
- Illusive (2026)

=== Novellas ===
- "Magic Fingers" in Wicked Words: Sex on Holiday (2005) and Black Lace Quickies 7 (2007) and Wicked (2012)
- "Catching Caroline" (2005)
- "Misled" (2005)
- "Kiss of the Night" (2005)
- "Snaring The Huntress" (2005)
- "Wish List" (2005) in White Hot Holidays, Vol. II (2006)
- "Treasure Hunters" in Ellora's Cavemen: Dreams of the Oasis II (2006)
- "A Familiar Kind of Magic" in Alluring Tales: Awaken the Fantasy (2007)
- "Salacious Robinson" in Got a Minute? (2007)
- "Magic and Mayhem" (2007)
- "Mischief and the Marquess" in Perfect Kisses (2007)
- "That Old Black Magic" in Alluring Tales: Hot Holiday Nights (2008)
- "Eve of Sin City" (2010)
- "Eve of Warfare" (2010) in The Mammoth Book of Paranormal Romance 2 (2010)
- "Lucien's Gamble" (2011) in Bad Boys Ahoy! (2006)
- "All Revved Up" (2011) in Wicked Reads (2011)
- "Razor's Edge" in The Promise of Love (2011)
- "Taking the Heat" in Men Out of Uniform (2011)
- "A Dark Kiss of Rapture" (2011)
- "Iron Hard" (2012) in Steamlust: Steampunk Erotic Romance (2011)
- "Black Magic Woman" (2013) in Spellbound
- "What Happened in Vegas" (2011) in Best Erotic Romance (2011)
- "Blood and Roses" in Guns and Roses (2012)
- "On Fire" in Hot in Handcuffs (2012)
- "Afterburn" (2013)
- "Aftershock" (2014)
- "Hard to Breathe" (2015) in Premiere
- "Butterfly in Frost" (2019)
- "On Carnegie Lane" (2024) in Fourteen Days: A Collaborative Novel

=== Series/Related Titles ===
==== Alluring Tales ====
- "A Familiar Kind of Magic" in Alluring Tales: Awaken the Fantasy (2007)
- "That Old Black Magic" in Alluring Tales: Hot Holiday Nights (2008)
- "Black Magic Woman" in Spellbound (2013)

==== Carnal Thirst ====
- Misled (2005)
- Kiss of the Night (2005)
- Declassified: Dark Kisses (2006)
- Carnal Thirst (2012)

==== Cosmo Red Hot Reads from Harlequin ====
- Afterburn (2013)
- Aftershock (2014)
- Afterburn/Aftershock (2014)

==== Crossfire ====
- Bared to You (2012)
- Reflected in You (2012)
- Entwined with You (2013)
- Captivated by You (2014)
- One with You (2016)

==== Crossroads ====
- Ireland (2025)
- Illusive (2025)

==== Dream Guardians ====
- Pleasures of the Night (2007)
- Heat of the Night (2008)

==== Georgian Series ====
- Ask For It (2006)
- Passion for the Game (2007)
- A Passion for Him (2007)
- Don't Tempt Me (2008)

==== Marked Series (w/a S. J. Day) ====
- Eve of Darkness (2009)
- Eve of Destruction (2009)
- Eve of Chaos (2009)
- Eve of Sin City (2010)
- Eve of Warfare (2010) in The Mammoth Book of Paranormal Romance 2 (2010)
- Marked (2013)

==== Renegade Angels ====
- A Dark Kiss of Rapture (2011)
- A Touch of Crimson (2011)
- A Caress of Wings (2012)
- A Hunger So Wild (2012)

==== Blacklist ====
- So Close (2023)
- Too Far (2023)
- Blacklist: So Close & Too Far (2024)

=== Non-fiction ===
- Perfectly Plum: Unauthorized Essays on the Life, Loves and Other Disasters of Stephanie Plum, Trenton Bounty Hunter (2007)
- The Write Ingredients: Recipes from Your Favorite Authors (2007)
- Lustfully Ever After: Fairy Tale Erotic Romance (Foreword - 2011)
- Fifty Writers on Fifty Shades of Grey (2012)
- Story of O (Introduction - 2013)
- Writing New Adult Fiction (Foreword - 2014)

== Honors ==
=== Industry ===
- Day was honored with Romance Writers of America’s Service Award, which is intended to honor major commitments of service to RWA and is presented for the accumulated body of effort a volunteer may make during a lifetime.

=== Appreciation ===
- 2012 Goodreads Choice Award Nominee – Best Author
- 2006 CAPA Award Nominee — Favorite Erotic Author

=== The RITA Award ® ===
- 2008 RITA® Finalist — Best Romantic Novella — Mischief and the Marquess
- 2007 RITA® Finalist — Best Romantic Novella — Her Mad Grace

=== Bookseller/Librarian ===
- 2024 Amazon Editors' Choice – Best Literature & Fiction – Fourteen Days
- 2023 Apple Books Editors' Choice – Most Anticipated Romances – So Close
- 2019 Amazon Editors' Choice – Best Books of the Month in Romance for September – Butterfly in Frost
- 2016 Amazon Editors' Choice – Best Book of the Month for April – One with You
- 2016 Apple Books Editors' Choice – Best Book of the Month for April – One with You
- 2014 Amazon Editors' Choice – Best Books of the Year – The Stranger I Married
- 2014 Amazon Editors' Choice – Best Romance Books of March – Afterburn/Aftershock
- 2013 Amazon Editors' Choice – Best Books of the Month in Romance for June – Entwined with You
- 2012 Amazon Editors' Choice – Best Books of the Month in Romance for – Reflected in You
- 2012 Amazon Editors' Choice – Best of the Year in Romance – Bared to You
- 2012 Golden Quill Award Finalist — A Touch of Crimson
- 2012 Gayle Wilson Award of Excellence Finalist — A Touch of Crimson
- 2011 Rhapsody Book Club – Heartthrob of the Month for October – Men Out of Uniform
- 2011 Barnes & Noble Romance Buyer/Expert Jules Herbert – Must-read Romance for October – Men Out of Uniform
- 2011 Barnes & Noble Romance Buyer/Expert Jules Herbert – Must-read Romance for October – A Touch of Crimson
- 2010 CRW Award of Excellence Finalist — Best Erotic Romance — In the Flesh
- 2010 Golden Quill Award Finalist — Best Erotic Romance — In the Flesh
- 2009 Maggie Award Finalist — Best Historical — Don’t Tempt Me
- 2008 Laurel Wreath Award Winner — Best Historical — Passion for the Game
- 2008 Gayle Wilson Award of Excellence Finalist — Best Novella — Mischief and the Marquess
- 2007 More Than Magic Award Finalist — Best Novella — Lucien’s Gamble
- 2007 Booksellers’ Best Award Finalist — Long Historical — Bad Boys Ahoy!
- 2007 Booksellers’ Best Award Finalist — Best First Book — Ask for It
- 2007 Gayle Wilson Award of Excellence Finalist — Best Novella — Lucien’s Gamble
- 2007 HOLT Medallion Award Finalist — Best Spicy Romance — Ask for It
- 2007 HOLT Medallion Award Finalist — Best First Book — Ask for It

=== Reader ===
- 2013 Goodreads Choice Award Final Round Nominee – Best Romance – Entwined with You
- 2012 Goodreads Choice Award Nominee – Best Romance – Bared to You
- 2012 Winter Rose Contest – Overall Winner of the Published Division – A Touch of Crimson
- 2012 National Readers’ Choice Award Finalist – Paranormal – A Touch of Crimson
- 2012 Winter Rose Contest – First Place Winner of the Paranormal Category of the Published Division – A Touch of Crimson
- 2010 Write Touch Readers’ Choice Award Winner — Best Erotic Romance — In the Flesh
- 2010 Readers’ Crown Award Winner — Best Urban Fantasy w/Romantic Elements — Eve of Darkness
- 2010 Heart of Excellence Readers’ Choice Award — 2nd Place Winner for Best Erotic Romance — In the Flesh
- 2010 Readers’ Crown Award Winner — Best Erotic Romance — In the Flesh
- 2010 Award of Excellence Finalist — Best Erotic Romance — In the Flesh
- 2009 Winter Rose Award Winner — Excellence in Historical Romantic Fiction — Don’t Tempt Me
- 2009 National Readers’ Choice Award Winner — Best Erotic Romance — In the Flesh
- 2009 Aspen Gold Readers’ Choice Finalist — Best Erotic Romance — Heat of the Night
- 2008 Aspen Gold Readers’ Choice Finalist — Best Erotic Romance — Pleasures of the Night
- 2008 National Readers’ Choice Winner — Best Erotic Romance — Heat of the Night
- 2007 National Readers’ Choice Finalist — Best Historical — Passion for the Game
- 2007 Aspen Gold Readers’ Choice Finalist — Best Erotic Romance — Ask for It
- 2007 National Readers’ Choice Finalist — Best Erotic Romance — Ask for It
- 2007 National Readers’ Choice Finalist — Best First Book — Ask for It
- 2007 Write Touch Readers’ Choice Award Finalist – Ask for It
- 2007 Aspen Gold Readers’ Choice Winner — Best Erotic Romance — Bad Boys Ahoy!
- 2004 Lori Foster/Brava Contest — Readers’ Choice Winner — Stolen Pleasures

=== Writer ===
- 2010 PRISM Award Finalist — Best Dark Paranormal — Eve of Darkness
- 2010 PRISM Award Finalist — Best Erotic Paranormal — In the Flesh
- 2008 PRISM Award Finalist — Best Erotic Paranormal — Pleasures of the Night
- 2007 EPPIE Finalist — Best Erotic Historical — Ask for It
- 2007 EPPIE Winner — Best Erotic Contemporary — Wish List
- 2006 Passionate Plume Finalist — Best Historical — Ask for It

=== Reviewer ===
- 2023 The Times – Best Popular Fiction of March – So Close
- 2012 RT Book Reviews Reviewers’ Choice Award Nominee — Best Erotic Romance – Bared to You
- 2011 CAPA Award Winner – Best Anthology – Men Out of Uniform
- 2011 Publishers Weekly Top Ten Picks in Romance (Fall) – Seven Years to Sin
- 2009 Romantic Times Reviewers’ Choice Award Nominee — Best Paranormal/SF/Fantasy Erotic Romance — In the Flesh
- 2008 Romance Reviews Today – Best Book of the Year – Heat of the Night
- 2008 Romantic Times Reviewers’ Choice Award Winner — Best Sensual Historical — Don’t Tempt Me
- 2007 The Courier Mail – “Best of the Year” in romance – Passion for the Game
- 2007 Romantic Times Reviewers’ Choice Award Nominee — Best Historical Romantic Adventure — Passion for the Game
- 2007 Single Titles Reviewers’ Choice Nominee — Best Single Title Historical — Ask for It
- 2006 Single Titles Reviewers’ Choice Nominee — Best Single Title Historical — Bad Boys Ahoy!
- 2006 CAPA Award Winner — Best Historical Erotic Romance — The Stranger I Married
- 2005 CAPA Award Nominee — Best Erotic Paranormal Romance — Misled

=== Publisher ===
- 2006 Kensington Publishing’s Romance Editors’ February Pick – Bad Boys Ahoy!
- 2005 Amber Heat Author Winner for Catching Caroline
- 2005 Ellora’s Cave Author Appreciation Award “Best First Line” for Wish List

=== Pre-Published ===
- 2004 Kate Rothwell’s Short and Sweet 55 Words Contest – 2nd Place Winner – Stolen Pleasures in Bad Boys Ahoy!
- 2004 Gateway to the Rest Winner — Best Historical — Ask for It
- 2004 Some Like it Hot Finalist for Misled
- 2004 IRW Golden Opportunity Award Winner — Best of the Best — Ask for It
- 2004 IRW Golden Opportunity Award Winner — Best Historical — Ask for It
