= Probability (disambiguation) =

Probability is the measure of an event's likelihood.

Probability may also refer to:

- Probability theory, the branch of mathematics concerned with probability
  - Probability function (disambiguation)
- Probability (moral theology), a theory in Catholic moral theology for answering questions in which one does not know how to act
- Probability (Law & Order: Criminal Intent episode), an episode in the second season of the police procedural television series Law & Order: Criminal Intent
- Words of estimative probability, terms used to convey the likelihood of an event occurring

== See also ==
- Probably (disambiguation)
- Improbable (disambiguation)
