= Bared to You =

2012 book by Sylvia Day

Bared to You:
- Cover artwork for the first edition of the Berkley Books version of Bared to You
- Author: Sylvia Day
- Language: English
- Series: Crossfire
- Genre: Erotic fiction Romance
- Publisher: Berkley Books
- Publication date: April 3, 2012
- Publication place: United States
- Pages: 338
- ISBN: 978-0-42526390-7
- OCLC: 793726751
- Preceded by: Seven Years to Sin
- Followed by: Reflected in You

Bared to You is a 2012 New York Times bestselling erotic new adult romance novel by veteran writer Sylvia Day, focusing on the complicated relationship between two twentysomething protagonists with equally traumatic pasts. The novel was initially self-published on April 3, 2012, by Day, with Berkley Books re-publishing the book on June 12, 2012, with an initial print run of 500,000 copies. Bared to You is the first novel in Day's Crossfire® Saga (also called the Crossfire series) quintet, with the follow-up novel, Reflected in You, published in October 2012. The first two Crossfire novels sold five million English-language copies in 2012 and international rights were licensed in thirty-eight territories as of January 2013.

Bared to You was declared Penguin UK's "fastest selling paperback for a decade" and Penguin Group (USA) reported that Bared to You was Berkley's biggest breakout book of 2012. In December 2012, Amazon.com announced that Bared to You was #4 on the e-tailer's list of top 10 best-selling books of 2012 overall (print and Kindle combined), Apple announced that Bared to You was #5 on iTunes' Top Ten Books of the Year, and Nielsen announced that Bared to You was #7 on BookScan's Top 10 Print Book Sales of 2012 – Adult Fiction. In the UK, Nielsen inducted Bared to You in the Platinum Hall of Fame, which recognizes sales within the United Kingdom of over one million copies and "the wider cultural impact that sales of this magnitude signify."

Bared to You spent forty-five weeks on The New York Times trade paperback bestseller list and sixty-seven weeks on the USA Today bestseller list. In 2026, Penguin Random House's editors named Bared to You one of "The Best Romance Books of All Time."

== Synopsis ==
Multimillionaire socialite Eva Tramell, a 24-year-old survivor of childhood sexual abuse, finds it difficult at times to overcome her past, but she reciprocates a fierce sexual attraction with 28-year old billionaire Gideon Cross, another childhood sexual abuse survivor. Over the course of the quintet (as well as the Crossroads spin-off novels), Gideon and Eva leverage communication and therapy to overcome defensive coping mechanisms. Surrounded by a large cast of secondary characters - some of whom have nefarious agendas - Gideon and Eva are determined to build a safe and healthy romantic relationship.

Although frequently grouped with contemporaneous erotic novels featuring power imbalances and BDSM, the Crossfire series was written with a consent-forward, trauma-informed approach and contains neither bondage nor sadomasochism; the traumatic sexual pasts of the protagonists make the infliction of pain and use of restraints during sex intolerable. Both primary characters are wealthy, move through the same social circles, and the sexually experienced Eva is the driving force of the relationship, responsible for setting the tone as well as establishing the milestones she and Gideon work toward.

== Reception ==
Bared to You was selected by Amazon's editors as the #1 Best Book of the Year So Far in Romance, covering the period between January through to July of the year 2012. It remained on Amazon's Best Books of the Year in Romance end-of-year list covering the entire year of 2012. Bared to You was nominated for the 2012 Goodreads Choice Award for Best Romance and Day herself was nominated for Best Goodreads Author.

RT Book Reviews praised the book's characters, stating, "Day creates two multidimensional characters in heroine Eva and hero Gideon, whose successful and attractive exteriors hide traumatized pasts. Especially notable is Day's portrayal of Eva. The heroine is a rape survivor who is able to independently overcome her abuse and find a full and fulfilling sex life.", while a reviewer for The Guardian criticized the book as "banal". The Independent also criticized some of the book's elements as "easy to mock" but praised Day's writing and noted that the relationship was "at least healthier than the dysfunctional wreck of Fifty Shades".

== Media ==
In April 2013, HeroesAndHeartbreakers.com broke the news that Day's Crossfire series had been optioned for television adaptation. Lions Gate Entertainment secured the rights. Kevin Beggs, President of the Lionsgate Television Group, confirmed the acquisition on August 5, 2013 in a press release. Lionsgate TV Executive Vice President Chris Selak, who will oversee development for the studio, said, "The Crossfire series is an incredible property and it is a thrill to bring it to Lionsgate. Sylvia has created an enduring, sexy and edgy story, and we're looking forward to working with her to create a show that both excites and connects with audiences as her books have done." Although, Lionsgate optioned the rights to the Crossfire Saga in 2013 and renewed the option twice, Day declined to option again after three years of development. In 2019, the option was acquired by a different studio for development as a television series with Day executive producing. After two years of development, the studio was unable to find a screenwriter and the rights reverted to Day. In 2022, Crossfire was optioned by a third studio with Day executive producing. When Day reviewed a script that deviated considerably from the story in the novels, she reverted the rights and the project is again available to option.

== Erotic Trend in 2012 ==
The Crossfire Saga quintet and the Fifty Shades trilogy have very different core themes and character dynamics, but both series were published by Penguin Random House and both became massive global successes at the same time, spurring a wave of erotic releases and reissues in 2012. Many publishing houses imitated the two series' erotic content and packaging, but as The Guardian noted, "other houses' efforts made little impact."
