= Killer Instinct (disambiguation) =

Killer Instinct is a series of fighting video games.

- Killer Instinct (1994 video game), the first installment in the fighting-game series
- Killer Instinct (2013 video game), the third game in the series

Killer Instinct may also refer to:

== Film and television ==
- Killer Instinct (1988 film), an American television film directed by Waris Hussein
- Killer Instinct (1991 film), an American film written and directed by David Tausik
- Killer Instinct (1992 film) or Mad Dog Coll, an American film directed by Greydon Clark
- Killer Instinct (TV series), a 2005 American crime drama series
- Killer Instinct, a 2015 American true-crime TV series hosted by Chris Hansen
- "Killer Instincts", an episode of American television series The White Lotus
- "Killer Instinct" (Forever Knight), a 1994 television episode

== Other media ==
- Killer Instinct (card game), a Topps collectible card game
- Killer Instinct (novel), a 2006 novel by Joseph Finder
- The Killer Instinct, a 2015 album by Black Star Riders

== See also ==
- KI (disambiguation)
