= Twist Phelan =

American writer of crime fiction

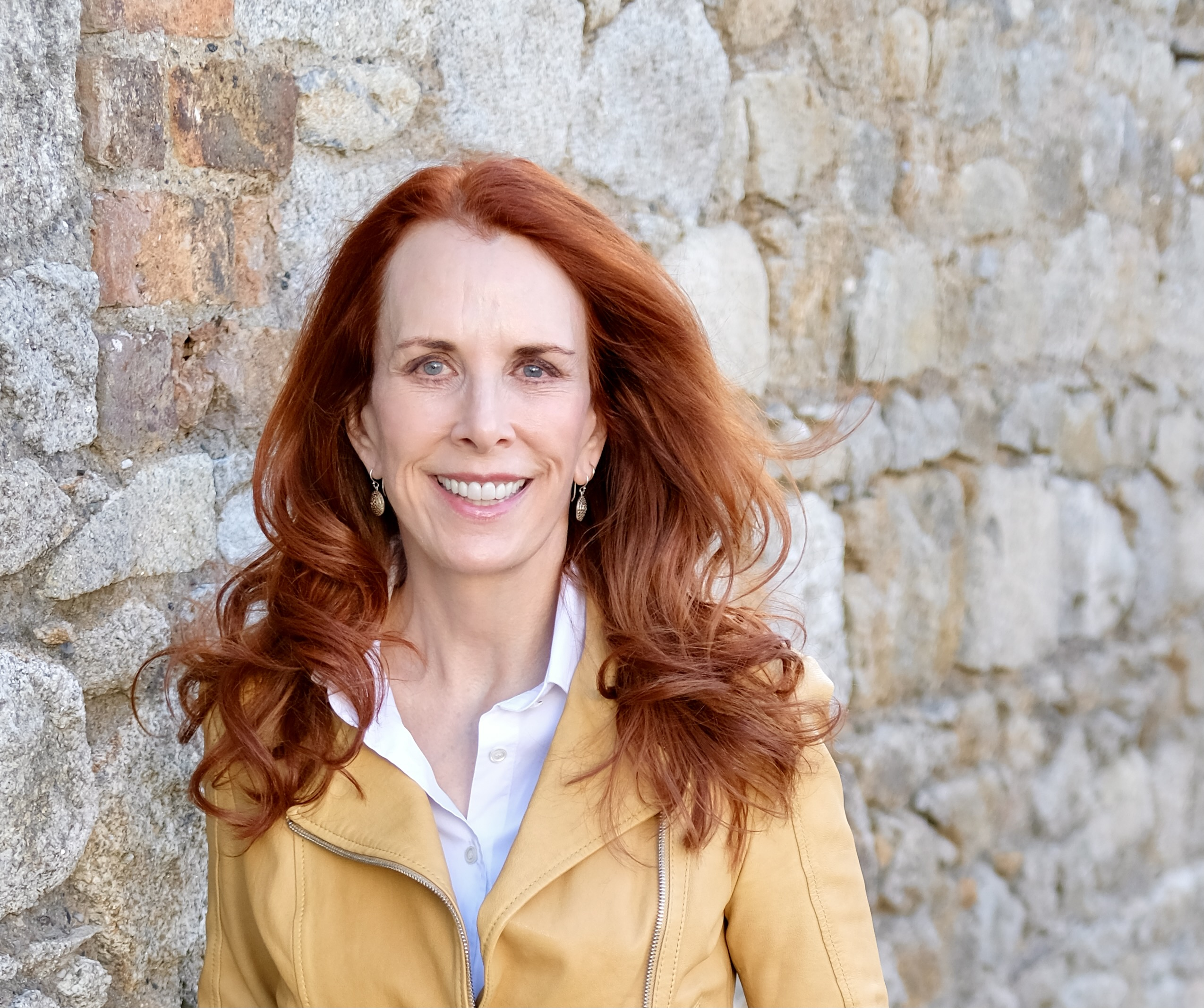
- Education: Stanford University
- Occupations: Writer, former trial lawyer

Twist Phelan is an American writer of crime fiction. She is known for her Finn Teller Corporate Spy mystery series, Pinnacle Peak mystery series, and her short stories, which have won numerous awards (including two International Thriller Writers Awards and the Arthur Ellis Award for Best Crime Short Story of the Year).

== Biography ==
Phelan attended Stanford University for both undergraduate and law school. She was a trial lawyer before becoming a writer. In March 2013, Phelan married Jack Chapple in Denver.

== Awards ==
- Thriller Award for Best Short Story of the Year for A Stab in the Heart (2010; won)
- Thriller Award for Best Short Story of the Year for Footprints in Water (2014; won)
- Arthur Ellis Award for Best Crime Short Story of the Year for Footprints in Water (2014; won)
- Mystery Writers of America Six-Word Mystery Contest/Thriller (2022, 2024; won)

== Bibliography ==
=== Finn Teller ===
1. Fake (2016)
2. Exit (2016)
3. Doubt (2016)
4. Splice (2016)
5. Coin (2017)

=== Pinnacle Peak ===
1. Heir Apparent (2002)
2. Family Claims (2004)
3. Spurred Ambition (2006)
4. False Fortune (2007)

=== Stand-alone novels ===
- The Target (2018)
- Snowed (2024)

=== Short stories ===
- For the Good of the Game, published in Red Herring Mystery Magazine and The Mystery Review
- A Trader's Lot (2005), published in Wall Street Noir
- Floored (2007), published in Ellery Queen’s Mystery Magazine
- A Stab in the Heart (2009), published in Ellery Queen’s Mystery Magazine
- Talk to Me (2009), published in ACWL Murder Past, Murder Present
- Time Will Tell (2009), published in MWA Presents The Prosecution Rests and republished in By Hook or By Crook and 30 More of the Best Crime and Mystery Stories of the Year
- The Peahen (2010), published in Ellery Queen’s Mystery Magazine
- Happine$$ (2012), published in MWA Presents the Rich and the Dead
- The Fourteenth Juror (2012), published in MWA Presents Vengeance
- Footprints in Water (2013), published in Ellery Queen's Mystery Magazine and republished in Les Prix Arthur Ellis 3
- Game (2018), published in Ellery Queen's Mystery Magazine
- Fathers-in-Law (2019), published in Ellery Queen's Mystery Magazine
- Rude Awakening (2019), published in Ellery Queen's Mystery Magazine
- Used To Be (2020), published in Ellery Queen's Mystery Magazine
- The Bridge (2022), published in Ellery Queen's Mystery Magazine
- The Kindness of Strangers (2022), published in Ellery Queen's Mystery Magazine
- It’s a Small World (After All) (2023), published in Ellery Queen's Mystery Magazine
- List of Contributors (2023), published in The Dark City Crime & Mystery Magazine
- Judge Not (2023), published in Ellery Queen's Mystery Magazine
- Soon It'll Be Over (2023), published in Ellery Queen's Mystery Magazine
- Sorry Sorry (2024), published in Mystery Tribune
- Aim (2024), published in Ellery Queen's Mystery Magazine and republished in The Best Private Eye Stories of the Year 2025
- Artificial Hearts (2024), published in Ellery Queen's Mystery Magazine
- An Ounce of Prevention (2024), published in Ellery Queen’s Mystery Magazine
- Bertha (2024), published in Friend of the Devil: Crime Fiction Inspired by Songs of the Grateful Dead
- Double Parked (2024), published in Ellery Queen’s Mystery Magazine
- Dupe (2025), published in Ellery Queen’s Mystery Magazine
- Pay Dirt (2025), published in Ellery Queen’s Mystery Magazine
- Good Shoes (2025), published in Coolest American Stories 2025 and republished in The Best American Mystery and Suspense 2025
- The Border (2025), published in Ellery Queen’s Mystery Magazine
- Authorized Treatment (2025), published in Ellery Queen’s Mystery Magazine

=== Articles ===
- Cowboy Up (2002), published in Mystery Scene Magazine
- Queen of the Road (2004), published in Mystery Scene Magazine
- The Writer's Life...From the Other Side of the Breakfast Table (2005), published in Mystery Scene Magazine
- Climb Every Mountain...and Building, Too (2006), published in Mystery Scene Magazine
- Paddle Up! (2007), published in Mystery Scene Magazine

=== Essays ===
- Twist Phelan on Bootlegger's Daughter by Margaret Maron (2006), published in Mystery Muses: 100 Classics that Inspire Today's Mystery Writers
- Writing Novels Versus Stories: It’s Not About the Word Count (well, just a little) (2013) published in Something is Going to Happen
- The "Art" of Writing (2022) published in Something is Going to Happen
- Writing Is More than Output: Why Writers Shouldn’t Fear AI (2023) published in Something is Going to Happen
- Writing the Unwritable (2025) published in Something is Going to Happen
