= Perhaps =

Perhaps may refer to:

- Perhaps (album), the fourth album released by the Scottish New Wave band Associates
- "Quizás, Quizás, Quizás", "Perhaps, Perhaps, Perhaps" in English, a popular song
- Perhaps, English title of the 1999 French science fiction film Peut-être
- "Perhaps" (song), a song by the band Guns N' Roses

== See also ==
- Probably (disambiguation)
