= Chevy Stevens =

Canadian author of thriller novels (born 1973)

Chevy Stevens (born 1973 as Rene Unischewski) is a Canadian author of thriller novels. She lives on Vancouver Island, British Columbia.

Stevens was working as a realtor when she got the idea for her novel Still Missing, in which a real estate agent is abducted while holding an open house. Her book Still Missing was a New York Times bestseller, and the winner of the 2011 International Thriller Writers Award for Best First Novel.

== Bibliography ==
- Still Missing, St. Martin's Press, 2010 - A real estate named Annie O'Sullivan is abducted by a man she calls "The Freak" during an open house. She's held captive in a cabin in the mountains.
- Never Knowing, St. Martin's Press, 2011
- Always Watching, St. Martin's Press, 2013
- "The Other Side" (short story, St. Martin's Press, 2013
- That Night, St. Martin's Press, 2014
- Those Girls, St. Martin's Press, 2015 - Three sisters murder their dad and run away from home, trying to form a new life without getting caught for their crime.
- Never Let You Go, St. Martin's Press, 2017
- Dark Roads, St. Martin's Press, 2021
