= Sean Doolittle (author) =

American novelist (born 1971)

- Born: 1971 (age 54–55); Nebraska, U.S.
- Occupation: Author
- Writing career
- Genre: Crime/Suspense
- Notable awards: ITW Thriller Award; Barry Award
- Website: www.seandoolittle.com

Sean Doolittle (1971 Nebraska-) is an American author of crime and suspense fiction.

== Career ==
Born and raised in southeastern Nebraska, Doolittle began publishing short stories in small press horror magazines and commercial anthologies while attending college at the University of Nebraska-Lincoln.

Doolittle's first novel, Dirt (UglyTown, 2001), shifted into crime fiction and appeared at #83 in the extended Amazon's Best Books of the Year listing (Top 100 Editors Picks, 2001). His second novel, Burn (UglyTown, 2003), was reprinted in paperback by Random House/Bantam Dell. Bantam Dell went on to publish Doolittle's next four crime novels, which garnered critical praise from The New York Times, The Wall Street Journal, The Washington Post, The Chicago Sun-Times, and People, among other publications, as well as from respected authors in the genre.

Doolittle's books have been translated in Brazil, France, The Netherlands, and Poland.

== Novels ==
- Dirt (UglyTown, 2001)
- Burn (UglyTown, 2003; Bantam Dell, 2003)
- Rain Dogs (Bantam Dell, 2005)
- The Cleanup (Bantam Dell, 2006)
- Safer (Bantam Dell, 2009)
- Lake Country (Bantam Dell, 2012)
- Kill Monster (Audible Originals, Severn House, 2019)
- Device Free Weekend (Grand Central Publishing, 2023)

== Awards ==
- ITW Thriller Award – Best Paperback Original (Winner, Lake Country, 2013)
- Barry Award – Best Paperback Original (Winner, The Cleanup, 2007)
- Anthony Award – Best Paperback Original (Nomination, The Cleanup, 2007)
- CrimeSpree Magazine “Favorite Book” (Readers’ choice, The Cleanup, 2007)
- Spinetingler Award – Rising Star (Winner, The Cleanup, 2007)
- ForeWord Magazine Book of the Year (Gold Medal, Burn, 2003)
- Derringer Award – Best Long Story (Tie, 2011)
- CWA/Macallan Short Story Dagger (Nomination, 2002)
- Nebraska Book Award honor book selections for Lake Country and The Cleanup
