= Paranoia (2013 film) =

Film directed by Robert Luketic

- Theatrical release poster
- Directed by: Robert Luketic
- Screenplay by: Barry Levy; Jason Hall
- Based on: Paranoia by Joseph Finder
- Produced by: Alexandra Milchan; Scott Lambert; Deepak Nayar
- Starring: Liam Hemsworth; Gary Oldman; Amber Heard; Harrison Ford; Lucas Till; Embeth Davidtz; Julian McMahon; Josh Holloway; Richard Dreyfuss
- Cinematography: David Tattersall
- Edited by: Dany Cooper; Tracy Adams
- Music by: Junkie XL
- Production companies: Gaumont; EMJAG Digital Productions; Film 360; Demarest Films
- Distributed by: Relativity Media
- Release date: August 16, 2013 (United States)
- Running time: 106 minutes
- Country: United States
- Language: English
- Budget: $35 million
- Box office: $17.1 million

Paranoia is a 2013 American thriller film directed by Robert Luketic. Barry L. Levy and Jason Hall wrote the screenplay, loosely based on the 2004 novel of the same name by Joseph Finder. The film stars Liam Hemsworth, Gary Oldman, Amber Heard, and Harrison Ford. Released by Relativity Media on August 16, 2013, it became a box-office bomb, grossing $17.1 million against its budget of $35 million, and received negative reviews by critics.

== Plot ==
Adam Cassidy is a low-level inventor who works for a corporation run by Nicholas Wyatt. After being fired for insubordination, Adam uses the company's credit card to pay for bottle service for his friends at a club. Wyatt and his enforcer, Miles Meachum, blackmail Adam into becoming a corporate spy for Wyatt by threatening to have him arrested for fraud.

Adam is trained by Judith Bolton and infiltrates a company run by Wyatt's former mentor, Jock Goddard. He provides Goddard, who stole several of Wyatt's ideas, with advanced software that can hack into cellphones, with potential military applications. FBI Agent Gamble interrogates Adam, revealing that three other employees of Wyatt who transferred to Goddard's company were found dead, but Adam ignores him.

Adam finds out that Emma Jennings, a woman he met during the party, is the Director of Marketing at Goddard's company. He initiates a relationship with Emma to steal files about Goddard's upcoming projects. Wyatt threatens to kill Adam's father, Frank Cassidy, if Adam doesn't steal a revolutionary prototype cellphone, called Occura developed by Goddard. Adam later finds out Meachum and Bolton are monitoring him, so he destroys the cameras in his apartment. In retaliation, Meachum runs over Adam's friend, Kevin, with a car, almost killing him. Adam is given 48 hours to steal the prototype.

Adam uses Emma's thumbprint lifted from a spoon to gain security access to the company's vault. He is confronted there by Goddard, who intends to take over Wyatt's company with evidence that Adam was acting as Wyatt's spy. Emma finds out Adam used her. Adam recruits Kevin to help him. A meeting is set with Wyatt and Goddard, where it is revealed that Bolton has spied against Wyatt on Goddard's behalf. Both men speak of the crimes they have committed to sabotage each other's companies.

Adam secretly used software to transmit their conversation to Kevin, whose computer recordings are turned over to the FBI. Goddard, Wyatt, Bolton, and Meachum are arrested by Gamble, while Adam is released for contributing to the FBI's investigation. He opens a small startup company in Brooklyn with Kevin and their friends, and reconciles with Emma, thanking her with a passionate kiss.

== Cast ==
- Liam Hemsworth as Adam Cassidy
- Gary Oldman as Nicholas Wyatt
- Amber Heard as Emma Jennings
- Harrison Ford as Augustine "Jock" Goddard
- Lucas Till as Kevin
- Embeth Davidtz as Dr. Judith Bolton
- Julian McMahon as Miles Meachum
- Josh Holloway as FBI Agent Gamble
- Richard Dreyfuss as Frank Cassidy
- Angela Sarafyan as Allison
- Nickson Ruto as Fala
- William Peltz as Morgan
- Kevin Kilner as Tom Lundgren
- Christine Marzano as Nora Sommers
- Charlie Hofheimer as Richard McAllister

== Production ==
Principal photography commenced on location in Philadelphia in July 2012, and returned for further filming at the end of November 2012. The first trailer was released on June 6, 2013. The film was scored by Junkie XL.

== Release ==
Relativity Media released Paranoia on August 16, 2013, and it was a box office bomb. The film debuted at #13 in the United States, generating only $3.5 million in its first weekend and going on to gross a total of $7.4 million in the United States. It made $9.7 million in other countries for a worldwide total of $17.1 million. Variety magazine listed Paranoia as one of "Hollywood's biggest box office bombs of 2013".

== Reception ==
Rotten Tomatoes, a review aggregator, reports that 8% of 106 critics have given Paranoia a positive review; the average rating is 3.9/10. Their consensus is: "Clichéd and unoriginal, Paranoia is a middling techno-thriller with indifferent performances and a shortage of thrills." On Metacritic, the film has a rating of 32 out of 100 based on 30 critics, indicating "generally unfavorable reviews". Audiences polled by CinemaScore gave the film an average grade of "C+" on an A+ to F scale.

Stephen Holden of The New York Times wrote of Hemsworth, "Not since Taylor Lautner has Hollywood ogled a pretty boy this vacant and poorly prepared." Andrew Barker of Variety wrote, "No one seems paranoid enough in this indifferently made, nearly tension-free thriller." Stephen Farber of The Hollywood Reporter called it "slick but muddled".

== See also ==
- List of films featuring surveillance
