= ACWL =

French rock band

- Origin: Paris, France
- Genres: Alternative rock, gothic rock, dream pop, indie pop, pop rock
- Years active: 1995–present
- Labels: XIII Bis, Active
- Members: Clin; Jean; Patrick
- Website: www.acwl.net

For the ACWL Institution, Cf. Advisory Centre on World Trade Organization Law.

ACWL is a French rock group with pop/goth, metal and new wave influences.

== Members ==
- Céline – bass, vocals
- Patrick – drums
- Jean – guitar, vocals, keyboards, programming, sitar

David, the ex-drummer, quit the group in 2001 after the release of their eponymous album.

== Debut ==
The group was born in Paris in 1995. They recorded their first self-produced album in bad conditions.

They later signed with M10 and released an eponymous album in September 2001 in which they decided to particularly concentrate on the voice of Céline.

MCM, the record label, showed the video "À l'absent" which placed the "Acwliens" into the French rock spotlight.

The group have performed at numerous French venues. They played at Printemps de Bourges and at La Maroquinerie, and as support on the tour of Nicola Sirkis, the singer of Indochine, for the first part of his concert at Bercy on 3 June 2003.

== "Une vie plus tard" ==
On 2 May 2005, their second album "Une Vie plus tard" was released on Active Entertainment/Pias.

It was more melancholic than their first album, and the group used some important effects. The key tracks are "Embrasse-moi" and "Les Amants du paradis", as well as "Quand viendra l'heure", a duet with Nicola Sirkis, the second single released from the album.

The singles "Embrasse-moi" and "Quand viendre l'heure" received regular radio airplay, at the same time as the videos were regularly played on music television channels, and the group began to become known. They placed fourth in the "l'Indé 30" of Mouv' in 2005.

== Discography ==
- ACWL (2001)
- Une vie plus tard (2005)
- Le Chemin Du Ciel (2009)
- L'Etre Ange Demon (2012)
- Internel (2016)
