= Adam Fawer =

American novelist (born 1970)

- Born: 1970 (age 55–56); New York City, U.S.
- Education: University of Pennsylvania; Wharton School; Stanford Graduate School of Business (MBA)
- Occupation: Novelist
- Years active: 2005-present
- Known for: Improbable, Gnosis, Oz
- Notable work: Improbable (2005), Gnosis (2008), Oz (2016)

Adam Fawer (born 1970 in New York City) is an American novelist. Improbable, his first novel, has been translated into eighteen languages and won the 2006 International Thriller Writers Award for best first novel. His second novel, Gnosis, has been published in 2008 in German, Japanese and Turkish. His third novel, Oz, has been published in 2016 in Turkish only. Unlike the first two novels, it received generally negative reviews from critics and readers.

== Early life and education ==
Fawer holds undergraduate and master's degrees from the University of Pennsylvania and the Wharton School of the University of Pennsylvania and received an MBA from the Stanford Graduate School of Business.

== Career ==
During his corporate career, Fawer worked for a variety of companies including Sony Music, J.P. Morgan, and most recently, About.com, where he was the chief operating officer.

== Awards and honours ==
In 2006, Fawer won the International Thriller Writers award for Best First Novel.

== Personal life ==
Fawer lives in New York City with his partner and two sons.

== Bibliography ==
- Improbable, 2005 ISBN 0-06-073678-X
- Gnosis, also published as Empathy, 2008 ISBN 3463405199
- Oz, 2016

== See also ==
- Laplace's demon
