= Amanda Jayatissa =

Sri Lankan writer and novelist

- Occupations: writer, novelist, storyteller and author
- Known for: My Sweet Girl
- Awards: International Thriller Writers Awards (2022)

Amanda Jayatissa is a Sri Lankan author and writer.

== Biography ==
She grew up in Sri Lanka, and by the time she fell in love with reading novels from her childhood, coincidentally, prominent English children's writer and novelist Enid Blyton’s The Famous Five books were insanely popular in Sri Lanka. She insisted that she built an interest in reading mystery stories after being inspired from the literary works of Enid Blyton.

== Career ==
Her novel titled The Other One was supposed to be her debut novel publication but she insisted that she did not even identify the appropriate genre for the novel. It was her friends who identified the book The Other One as a particular genre of science fiction calling it as "steampunk". The Other One is based on storyline of three different characters with completely contrasting backgrounds collaborate to solve a murder mystery. She contemplated that she didn't have any idea of visualising fantasy world when narrating the storyline for her debut novel. Due to the complexity of the genre, she decided not to publish or market the novel The Other One in Sri Lanka. Despite not wanting to publish, The Other One, she was eventually adjudged as the winner in the English category of the 2017 edition of the Fairway National Literary Award at the 2017 Fairway Galle Literary Festival.

She won the award for Best First Novel category during the 2022 edition of the International Thriller Writers Awards for her novel titled My Sweet Girl. She also claimed the award for Best Paperback Original Novel category for her work titled Bloodline, during the 2022 International Thriller Writers Awards organized by the International Thriller Writers Association. Her novel My Sweet Girl was based on the genre of psychological thriller which focuses on the fictional life of main character Paloma who is depicted in the novel as a very unpleasant unlikeable character right from the word go due to her past experiences and struggles of her own past. Critics praised Amanda's debut novel, My Sweet Girl, for its realistic portrayal of the protagonist and also for being a thought-provoking novel with a theme centered on the deeper meaning of identity. Her debut work was also lauded for being profound in addition to being a thoughtful and engaging thriller.

Her upcoming latest novel titled Island Witch is scheduled to be published on 27 February 2024. She engaged in promoting her third novel, Island Witch, in full swing during the 2024 Galle Literary Festival.
