= Problem child =

Problem child may refer to a child who is particularly difficult to raise or educate, especially due to disruptive or antisocial behavior.

== Film, television and theatre ==
- Problem Child (film), a 1990 comedy film directed by Dennis Dugan, with two sequels and a derivative TV series
- Problem Child (TV series), an animated series based on the films
- Problem Child, a 1997 Canadian drama, from the six-play cycle Suburban Motel, written by George F. Walker
- "Problem Child", an Instant Star episode
- "Problem Child", an Umineko no Naku Koro ni episode

== Music ==
- Problem Child, a 1980s band featuring Louis Prima Jr.

=== Songs ===
- "Problem Child" (The Damned song)
- "Problem Child" (The Beach Boys song), a 1990 single
- "Problem Child", a song by AC/DC from Dirty Deeds Done Dirt Cheap
- "Problem Child", a song by Doyle Bramhall II & Smokestack from Welcome
- "Problem Child", a song by Glue Gun from The Scene Is Not for Sale
- "Problem Child", a song by Little Big Town from Nightfall
- "Problem Child", a song by Roy Orbison from Roy Orbison at the Rock House
- "Problem child", a song by Graham Parker and The Rumour
- "Problem Child", a song by pop-punk band Simple Plan from Taking One for the Team

== Other uses ==
- Problem child (growth–share matrix), an embryonic, start-up fund dependant, commercial endeavour archetype
- The Problem Child, a 2006 Sisters Grimm novel by Michael Buckley
- Problem Child, a boat that set a speed record
- LSD: Mein Sorgenkind (LSD: My Problem Child), a book by Albert Hofmann
