= Joseph Finder =

American thriller writer

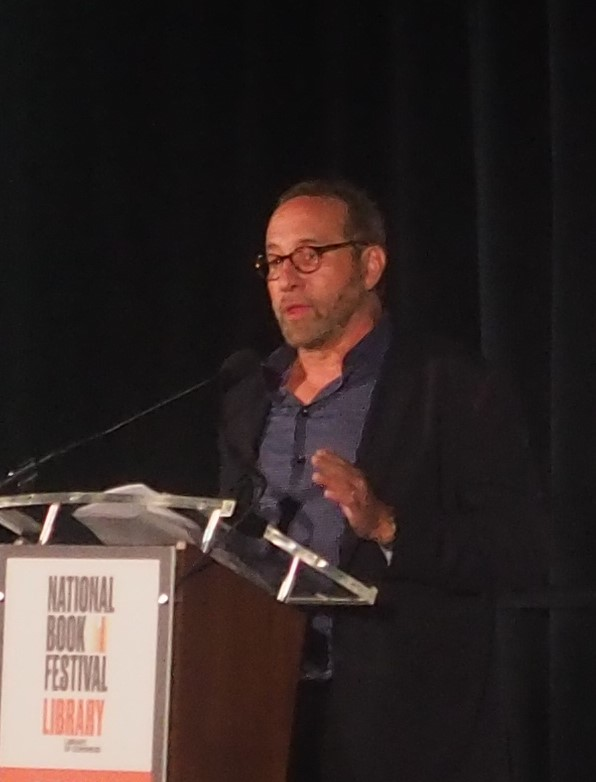
- Born: October 6, 1958 (age 68); Chicago, Illinois, U.S.
- Education: Yale University; Harvard University
- Occupation: Novelist
- Writing career
- Period: 1990–present
- Genres: Suspense, psychological thriller, crime fiction
- Notable works: High Crimes, Paranoia, Killer Instinct,Buried Secrets,House on Fire
- Notable awards: International Thriller Writers Awards Best Novel (Killer Instinct), Strand Magazine Critics Award Best Novel (Guilty Secrets)
- Website: josephfinder.com

Signature
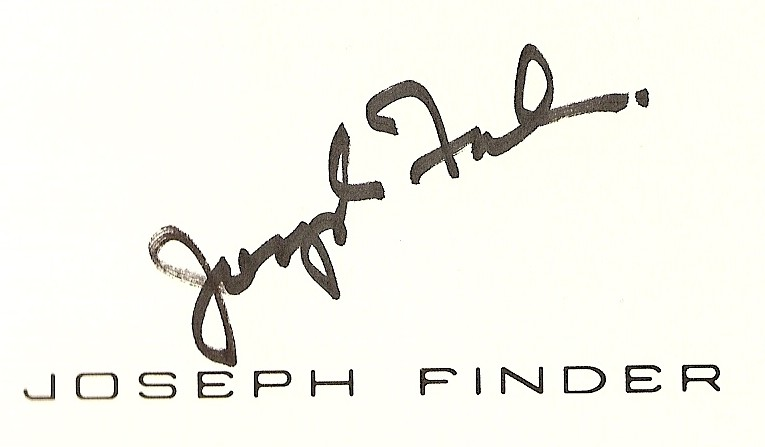

Joseph Finder (born October 6, 1958) is an American thriller writer. His books include Paranoia, Company Man, The Fixer, Killer Instinct, Power Play, and the Nick Heller series of thrillers. His novel High Crimes was made into the film of the same name starring Ashley Judd and Morgan Freeman. His novel Paranoia was adapted into a 2013 film starring Liam Hemsworth, Gary Oldman, and Harrison Ford.

== Early life ==
Finder was born in Chicago, Illinois, on October 6, 1958, and spent much of his early childhood in Afghanistan and the Philippines before his family returned to the United States and lived in Bellingham, Washington, and outside Albany, New York. He is of Jewish descent. Finder majored in Russian studies at Yale University, where he graduated summa cum laude and Phi Beta Kappa. He was also a bass singer in the Yale Whiffenpoofs (1980). He received a master's degree from the Harvard Russian Research Center and later taught on the Harvard faculty. He said that he "was recruited to the Central Intelligence Agency but eventually decided he preferred writing fiction".

== Career ==
Finder published Red Carpet: The Connection Between the Kremlin and America's Most Powerful Businessmen (1983), about Dr. Armand Hammer's ties to Soviet intelligence. Finder's first novel, The Moscow Club (1991), imagined a KGB coup against Soviet leader Mikhail Gorbachev. His second novel, Extraordinary Powers (1994), was about the discovery of a Soviet mole in the highest ranks of the CIA.

Paranoia (2004) was a New York Times bestseller in both hardcover and paperback, as was Company Man (2005). Finder won the 2007 International Thriller Writers Award for best novel for Killer Instinct (St. Martin's Press), published in May 2006. Power Play, published in 2007, was nominated for a Gumshoe Award. Vanished, the first novel to feature Finder's series character Nick Heller, was nominated for the 2010 International Thriller Writers Award for best novel. Buried Secrets, the second Nick Heller novel, won the 2011 Strand Magazine Critics Award for Best Novel, sharing the award with The Cut by George Pelecanos. Suspicion (2014) was the first book to be published under Finder's new contract with Dutton, a subsidiary of Penguin Random House; The Fixer, another standalone, followed in 2015. Guilty Minds, the third novel to feature Finder's series character, Nick Heller, was published in summer 2016. Another standalone novel, Judgment, was published in 2019. Dutton published the fourth Nick Heller novel, House on Fire, in 2020.

Finder is a founding member of the International Thriller Writers Association and served as Financial Advisor to International PEN-New England. He is also a member of the Association of Former Intelligence Officers. He writes on espionage and international affairs for publications including The New York Times and The Washington Post.

== Books ==
=== Nick Heller series ===
1. Vanished, ISBN 0-312-37908-0, 2009, paperback 2010
2. Buried Secrets, ISBN 978-0-312-37914-8, Summer 2011
3. "Plan B", 2011
4. "Good and Valuable Consideration", in Faceoff, ISBN 978-1-476-76207-4 (with Jack Reacher), September 2014 (co-written with Lee Child)
5. Guilty Minds, ISBN 978-0-525-95462-0, July 2016
6. House on Fire, ISBN 978-1101985847, January 2020

=== Other novels ===
- The Moscow Club, ISBN 0-330-31350-9 paperback 1991 (out of print)
- Extraordinary Powers, ISBN 0-7528-2651-4 paperback 1994 (out of print)
- The Zero Hour, ISBN 0-7528-2650-6 paperback 1996 (out of print)
- High Crimes, ISBN 0-380-72880-X paperback 1998
- Paranoia, ISBN 0-312-94091-2 paperback 2004
- Company Man (retitled No Hiding Place in UK), ISBN 0-312-93942-6 paperback 2005
- Killer Instinct, ISBN 0-312-34747-2 (hardcover) 2006
- Power Play, ISBN 0-312-34748-0 (hardcover) 2007
- Suspicion, ISBN 0-525-95460-0 (hardcover) May 27, 2014
- The Fixer, ISBN 9780525954613 (hardcover) June 9, 2015
- The Switch, ISBN 9781101985786 (hardcover) June 13, 2017
- Judgment, ISBN 9781101985823 (hardcover) January 29, 2019
- The Oligarch's Daughter, ISBN 9780063396012 (hardcover) January 28, 2025

=== Nonfiction ===
- Red Carpet: The Connection Between the Kremlin and America's Most Powerful Businessmen. New York: Holt, Rinehart & Winston (1983)
