= Problem (disambiguation) =

A problem is a difficulty which may be resolved by problem solving.

Specific types include:

- Chess problem
- Computational problem
- Mathematical problem

Problem(s) or The Problem may also refer to:

== Arts and media ==
=== Literature, acting, and TV ===
- Problems (Aristotle), an Aristotelian (or pseudo-Aristotelian) collection of problems in question and answer form
- The Problem (play), by A. R. Gurney
- Problems (TV series), a 2012 Australian comedy television series
- The Problem with Jon Stewart, a former American current affairs television series

=== Music ===
- Problem (rapper), former stage name of American rapper JasonMartin (born 1985)

==== Albums ====
- The Problem (album), by Mathematics, 2005
- Problems (The Get Up Kids album), 2019
- Problems (Bluejuice album), 2007
- Problems, a 2020 EP by Bryce Vine

==== Songs ====
- "Problem" (Ariana Grande song), 2014
- "Problem" (Natalia Kills song), 2013
- "Problems" (The Everly Brothers song), 1958
- "Problems" (Matt Corby song), 2022
- "Fuckin' Problems", sometimes known as "Problems", a 2012 song by A$AP Rocky
- "Problem", in Hotel Transylvania (film) § Soundtrack, 2012
- "Problem", on The Hard Way (Deluxe) (2025) by Cameron Whitcomb
- "Problem", 2011 single by Erin Bowman
- "Problem", from Bistriji ili tuplji čovek biva kad... (1981) by Šarlo Akrobata
- "Problems", from Searching for a Former Clarity (2005) by Against Me!
- "Problems", from 9 Lives (2001) by AZ
- "Problems", from Glee (1997) by Bran Van 3000
- "Problems", from Come Over When You're Sober, Pt. 1 (2017) by Lil Peep
- "Problems", from Never Mind the Bollocks, Here's the Sex Pistols (1977) by the Sex Pistols
- "Problems", from What Ifs & Maybes (2023) by Tom Grennan
- "Problemz", from Escape from New York (2019) by Beast Coast

== Other uses ==
- Problem (horse), foaled 1823, a Thoroughbred racehorse
- "Problem", the term used in bouldering for the path that a climber takes to complete his or her route

== See also ==
- Problem child (disambiguation)
