= Alan Orloff =

Author

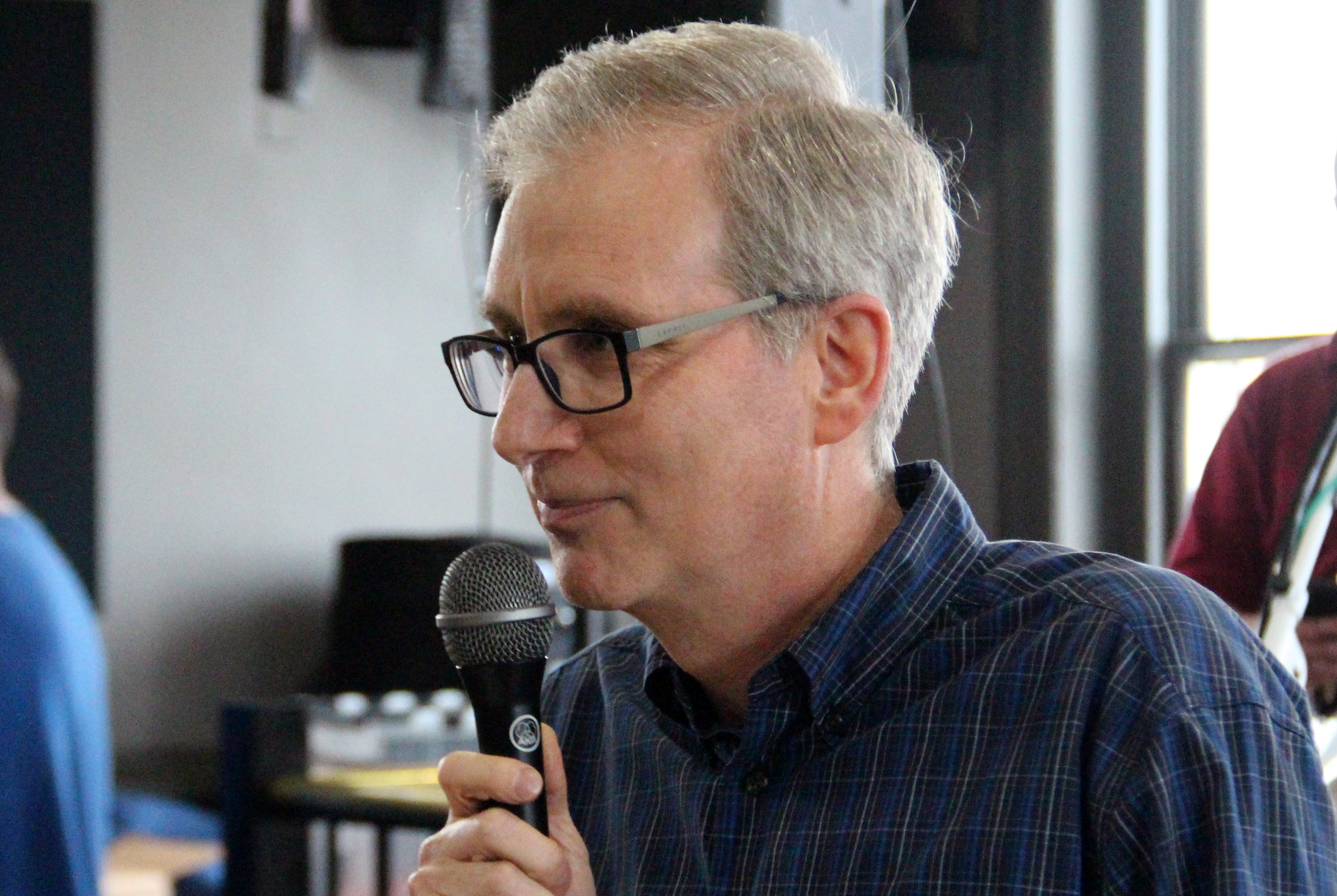
- Alan Orloff at Gaithersburg Book Festival in 2018
- Occupation: Writer
- Awards: Agatha Award (2021); Anthony Award (2021); International Thriller Writers Award (2021)

Alan Orloff is an author of mystery, thriller, horror, and young adult novels. His young adult novel I Play One on TV won the 2021 Agatha Award for Best Children/Young Adult Fiction and Anthony Award for Best Young Adult Novel.

== Awards and honors ==
Orloff's short story “Rule Number One” was selected for inclusion in The Best American Mystery Stories 2018, edited by Louise Penny and Otto Penzler.

Awards for Orloff's writing
Year	Title	Award		Result	Ref
2010	Diamonds for the Dead	Agatha Award	First Novel	Shortlisted	
2018	"Happy Birthday"	Derringer Award	Short Story	Shortlisted	
2019	"Dying in Dokesville"	Derringer Award	Short Story	Won	
2019	Pray for the Innocent	ITW Award	ebook Original Novel	Won	
2020	I Know Where You Sleep	Shamus Award	First PI Novel	Shortlisted	
2021	"Rent Due"	ITW Award	Short Story	Won	
2021	I Play One on TV	Agatha Award	Children/Young Adult Fiction	Won	
2022	I Play One on TV	Anthony Award	Young Adult Novel	Won	

== Publications ==
=== Standalone novels ===
- Diamonds for the Dead (2010)
- The Taste (2011)
- First Time Killer (2012)
- Ride-Along (2013)
- Running From the Past (2015)
- Pray for the Innocent (2019)
- I Know Where You Sleep (2020)
- I Play One on TV (2021)

=== The Last Laff Mystery series ===
- Killer Routine (2011)
- Deadly Campaign (2012)
