= Paranoia (novel) =

2004 novel written by Joseph Finder

- First edition
- Author: Joseph Finder
- Language: English
- Genre: Thriller
- Published: 2004 by St. Martin's Press
- Publication place: United States
- Media type: Print
- Pages: 426 pp
- ISBN: 978-0-3123-1914-4
- OCLC: 52860132
- Dewey Decimal: 813.54
- LC Class: PS3556.I458

Paranoia is a 2004 novel written by Joseph Finder and published in the United States by St. Martin's Press and Orion Publishing Group in the United Kingdom. Paranoia was a New York Times bestseller whose marketing campaign attracted national attention. St. Martin's reported four printings of the hardcover edition with 140,000 copies printed.

Paranoia is the story of Adam Cassidy, whose prank jeopardizes his low-level job at a tech startup. His superiors give him the chance to save his job if he agrees to an undercover corporate espionage assignment at a rival company.

In April 2009, Variety reported that the French film company Gaumont had acquired Paranoia for adaptation as a motion picture. The motion picture, also called Paranoia, was released in August 2013, starring Harrison Ford and Gary Oldman.
