= International Thriller Writers Awards =

Literary award for thriller fiction

- Country: United States (Conference location/main base)
- Status: Active
- First award: 2006
- Website: http://thrillerwriters.org/programs/award-nominees-and-winners/

The International Thriller Writers Awards are awarded by International Thriller Writers at the annual Thrillerfest conferences for outstanding work in the field since 2006.

The awards are presented by International Thriller Writers (ITW), a non-profit organization founded in 2004 by authors like Gayle Lynds and David Morrell to support and promote thriller writers globally. With over 6,600 members across 52 countries, the ITW Awards recognize excellence in numerous categories, including: Best Hardcover Novel, Best Series Novel, Best First Novel, Best Young Adult Novel, Best Short Story, and Best Audiobook. The eligibility is generally limited to works first published in the English language during the previous calendar year.

== Award winners ==
International Thriller Writers Award recipients
Year	Category	Author	Title	Publisher
2006	Best First Novel	Adam Fawer	Improbable	William Morrow
2006	Best Novel	Christopher Reich	The Patriots Club	Delacorte Press
2006	Best Paperback Original	R. Cameron Cooke	Pride Runs Deep	Jove
2006	Best Screenplay		Caché	Michael Haneke
2006	Thrillermaster	Clive Cussler		
2007	Best First Novel	Nick Stone	Mr Clarinet	Penguin
2007	Best Novel	Joseph Finder	Killer Instinct	St. Martin's Press
2007	Best Paperback Original	P.J. Parrish	An Unquiet Grave	Pinnacle
2007	Best Screenplay	Eric Roth	The Good Shepherd	
2007	Thrillermaster	James Patterson		
2008	Best First Novel	Joe Hill	Heart-Shaped Box	William Morrow
2008	Best Novel	Robert Harris	The Ghost	Simon & Schuster
2008	Best Paperback Original	Tom Piccirilli	The Midnight Road	Bantam
2008	Silver Bullet Award	Macy's and David Baldacci		
2008	Thrillermaster	Sandra Brown		
2009	Best First Novel	Tom Rob Smith	Child 44	Grand Central Publishing
2009	Best Novel	Jeffery Deaver	The Bodies Left Behind	Simon & Schuster
2009	Best Short Story	Alexandra Sokoloff	"The Edge of Seventeen"	The Darker Mask
2009	Silver Bullet Award	Brad Meltzer		
2009	Silver Bullet Award	Dollar General Literacy Foundation		
2009	Thrillermaster	David Morrell		
2010	Best First Novel	Jamie Freveletti	Running from the Devil	
2010	Best Hard Cover Novel	Lisa Gardner	The Neighbor	
2010	Best Paperback Original Novel	Tom Piccirilli	The Coldest Mile	
2010	Best Short Story	Twist Phelan	"A Stab in the Heart"	
2010	Silver Bullet Award	Linda Fairstein		
2010	Silver Bullet Award	US Airways		
2010	Thrillermaster	Ken Follett		
2010	True Thrill Award	Mark Bowden		
2011	Best First Novel	Chevy Stevens	Still Missing	
2011	Best Hard Cover Novel	John Sandford	Bad Blood	Virgil Flowers Series, book 4
2011	Best Paperback Original Novel	J. T. Ellison	The Cold Room	Taylor Jackson Series, book 4
2011	Best Short Story	Richard Helms	"The Gods for Vengeance Cry"	Ellery Queen's Mystery Magazine, November 2010
2011	Silver Bullet Award	Karin Slaughter		
2011	Thrillermaster	R. L. Stine		
2011	True Thrill Award	Joe McGinniss		
2012	Best Hard Cover Novel	Stephen King	11/22/63	
2012	Best Paperback Original Novel	Jeff Abbott	The Last Minute	
2012	Best Short Story	Tim L. Williams	"Half-Lives"	Ellery Queen's Mystery Magazine, March/April 2011
2012	Silver Bullet Award	Richard North Patterson		
2012	Thrillermaster	Jack Higgins		
2012	True Thrill Award	Ann Rule		
2013	Best E-Book Original Novel	CJ Lyons	Blind Faith	
2013	Best First Novel	Matthew Quirk	The 500	
2013	Best Hard Cover Novel	Brian Freeman	Spilled Blood	
2013	Best Paperback Original Novel	Sean Doolittle	Lake Country	
2013	Best Short Story	John Rector	Lost Things	
2013	Best Young Adult Novel	Dan Krokos	False Memory	
2013	Silver Bullet Award	Steve Berry		
2013	Thrillermaster	Anne Rice		
2014	Best E-Book Original Novel	Rebecca Cantrell	The World Beneath	
2014	Best First Novel	Jason Matthews	Red Sparrow	
2014	Best Hard Cover Novel	Andrew Pyper	The Demonologist	
2014	Best Paperback Original Novel	Jennifer McMahon	The One I Left Behind	
2014	Best Short Story	Twist Phelan	"Footprints in Water"	Ellery Queen's Mystery Magazine, July 2013
2014	Best Young Adult Novel	Cristin Terrill	All Our Yesterdays	
2014	Silver Bullet Award	Brenda Novak		
2014	Thrillermaster	Scott Turow		
2015	Best E-Book Original Novel	C.J. Lyons	Hard Fall	
2015	Best First Novel	Laura McHugh	The Weight of Blood	
2015	Best Hard Cover Novel	Megan Abbott	The Fever	
2015	Best Paperback Original Novel	Vincent Zandri	Moonlight Weeps	
2015	Best Short Story	Tim L. Williams	"The Last Wrestling Bear in West Kentucky"	Ellery Queen's Mystery Magazine
2015	Best Young Adult Novel	Elle Cosimano	Nearly Gone	
2015	Silver Bullet Award	Kathy Reichs		
2015	Thrillermaster	Nelson DeMille		
2016	Best E-Book Original Novel	Chris Kuzneski	The Prisoner's Gold	
2016	Best First Novel	Brian Panowich	Bull Mountain	
2016	Best Hard Cover Novel	Ian Caldwell	The Fifth Gospel	
2016	Best Paperback Original Novel	John Gilstrap	Against All Enemies	
2016	Best Short Story	Joyce Carol Oates	"Gun Accident: An Investigation"	Ellery Queen's Mystery Magazine
2016	Best Young Adult Novel	Michelle Painchaud	Pretending to be Erica	
2016	Silver Bullet Award	John Lescroart		
2016	Thrillermaster	Heather Graham		
2017	Best E-Book Original Novel	James Scott Bell	Romeo's Way	
2017	Best First Novel	Nick Petrie	The Drifter	
2017	Best Hard Cover Novel	Noah Hawley	Before the Fall	
2017	Best Paperback Original Novel	Anne Frasier	The Body Reader	
2017	Best Short Story	Joyce Carol Oates	"Big Momma"	Ellery Queen's Mystery Magazine
2017	Best Young Adult Novel	A. J. Hartley	Steeplejack	
2017	Silver Bullet Award	Lisa Gardner		
2017	Thriller Legend Award	Tom Doherty		
2017	Thrillermaster	Lee Child		
2018	Best E-Book Original Novel	Sean Black	Second Chance	
2018	Best First Novel	K. J. Howe	The Freedom Broker	
2018	Best Hard Cover Novel	Riley Sager	Final Girls	
2018	Best Paperback Original Novel	Christine Bell	Grievance	
2018	Best Short Story	Zoë Z. Dean	"Charcoal and Cherry"	Ellery Queen's Mystery Magazine
2018	Best Young Adult Novel	Gregg Hurwitz	The Rains	
2018	Silver Bullet Award	James Rollins		
2018	Thriller Legend Award	Robert and Patricia Gussin (Oceanview Publishing)		
2018	Thrillermaster	George R. R. Martin		
2019	Best E-Book Original Novel	Alan Orloff	Pray for the Innocent	
2019	Best First Novel	C.J. Tudor	The Chalk Man	
2019	Best Hard Cover Novel	Jennifer Hillier	Jar of Hearts	
2019	Best Paperback Original Novel	Jane Harper	The Lost Man	
2019	Best Short Story	Helen Smith	"Nana"	Killer Women: Crime Club Anthology #2
2019	Best Young Adult Novel	Teri Bailey Black	Girl at the Grave	
2019	Silver Bullet Award	Harlan Coben		
2019	Thriller Legend Award	Margaret Marbury		
2019	Thrillermaster	John Sandford		
2020	Best E-Book Original Novel	Kerry Wilkinson	Close To You	
2020	Best First Novel	Angie Kim	Miracle Creek	
2020	Best Hard Cover Novel	Adrian McKinty	The Chain	
2020	Best Paperback Original Novel	Dervla McTiernan	The Scholar	
2020	Best Short Story	Tara Laskowski	"The Long-Term Tenant"	Ellery Queen's Mystery Magazine
2020	Best Young Adult Novel	Tom Ryan	Keep This To Yourself	
2021	Best E-Book Original Novel	Jeff Buick	A Killing Game	
2021	Best First Novel	David Heska Wanbli Weiden	Winter Counts	
2021	Best Hard Cover Novel	S. A. Cosby	Blacktop Wasteland	
2021	Best Paperback Original Novel	John Marrs	What Lies Between Us	
2021	Best Short Story	Alan Orloff	"Rent Due"	
2021	Best Young Adult Novel	Andrea Contos	Throwaway Girls	
2022	Best Audiobook	S. A. Cosby with Adam Lazarre-White (narrator)	Razorblade Tears	Macmillan
2022	Best E-Book Original Novel	E. J. Findorff	Blood Parish	E. J. Findorff
2022	Best First Novel	Amanda Jayatissa	My Sweet Girl	Berkley
2022	Best Hardcover Novel	S. A. Cosby	Razorblade Tears	Flatiron Books
2022	Best Paperback Original Novel	Amanda Jayatissa	Bloodline	Thomas & Mercer
2022	Best Short Story	Scott Loring Sanders	"The Lemonade Stand"	Ellery Queen's Mystery Magazine
2022	Best Young Adult Novel	Courtney Summers	The Project	Wednesday Books
2022	ThrillerMasters	Frederick Forsyth		
2022	ThrillerMasters	Diana Gabaldon		
2023	Best Audiobook	Jennifer Hillier	Things We Do in the Dark	Macmillan Audio
2023	Best E-Book Original Novel	Diane Jeffrey	The Couple at Causeway Cottage	HarperCollins
2023	Best First Novel	Lauren Nossett	The Resemblance	Flatiron Books
2023	Best Hardcover Novel	Catriona Ward	Sundial	Macmillan
2023	Best Paperback Original Novel	Freida McFadden	The Housemaid	Grand Central Publishing
2023	Best Short Story	Catherine Steadman	"Stockholm"	
2023	Best Young Adult Novel	Kate McLaughlin	Daughter	Wednesday Books
2024	Best Audiobook	Gregg Hurwitz	The Last Orphan	Macmillan Audio
2024	Best E-Book Original Novel	Robert Swartwood	The Killing Room	Blackstone Audio
2024	Best First Novel	I. S. Berry	The Peacock and the Sparrow	Atria Publishing Group
2024	Best Hardcover Novel	S. A. Cosby	All the Sinners Bleed	Macmillan
2024	Best Paperback Original Novel	Luke Dumas	The Paleontologist	Atria Publishing Group
2024	Best Short Story	Lisa Unger	"Unknown Caller"	
2024	Best Young Adult Novel	Elizabeth E. Wein	Stateless	Little, Brown and Company
2024	ThrillerMasters	Tess Gerritsen		
2024	ThrillerMasters	Dennis Lehane		
2025	Best Audiobook	Kate Alice Marshall	No One Can Know	Macmillan Audio
2025	Best Series Novel	David Baldacci	To Die For	Grand Central Publishing
2025	Best First Novel	Jaime deBlanc	After Image	Thomas & Mercer
2025	Best First Novel	Marie Tierney	Deadly Animals	Henry Holt & Co
2025	Best Standalone Thriller Novel	Jason Rekulak	The Last One At The Wedding	Flatiron Books
2025	Best Standalone Mystery Novel	Kellye Garrett	Missing White Woman	Mulholland Books
2025	Best Short Story	Ivy Pochoda	"Jackrabbit Skin"	
2025	Best Young Adult Novel	Marisha Pessl	Darkly	Delacorte Press
2025	ThrillerMaster	John Grisham		
2025	Silver Bullet Award	James Patterson		
2026	Best Audiobook	Michael Robotham, narrated by Katy Sobey	The White Crow	Simon & Schuster
2026	Best Series Novel	Robert Crais	The Big Empty	Penguin/Putnam
2026	Best First Novel	Kelsey Cox	Party of Liars	Minotaur
2026	Best Standalone Thriller Novel	Megan Collins	Cross My Heart	Atria
2026	Best Short Story	Jessica Van Dessel	The Violent Season	Alfred Hitchcock Mystery Magazine
2026	Best Young Adult Novel	Diana Rodriguez Wallach	The Silenced	Delacorte Press
