= Improbable (novel) =

2005 novel by Adam Fawer

- Author: Adam Fawer
- Language: English
- Publication date: 2005

Improbable is a 2005 science fiction thriller novel by Adam Fawer, about a gambler who gains the power to predict the future. It was awarded the 2006 International Thriller Writers Award for best first novel.

== Plot summary ==
Improbable is the story of a gifted young man named David Caine, who has been troubled by debilitating epileptic seizures to the extent that his medical condition has thrown his life completely off track. He is a compulsive gambler, and heavily in debt to the local mafia.

During the course of the novel, Caine undergoes an experimental medical treatment in an attempt to set his life straight. After the procedure, he discovers that he is able to make predictions using his enhanced calculative skills, and change the future based on his discoveries. However, shadowy forces want to use his power for their own ends, and he faces a desperate battle for survival.

== 3-D cover ==
A major aspect of the book which has received a good deal of praise is the unique cover art, which features a lenticular three-dimensional image which shifts as the book is moved in relation to the viewer.

== Characters ==
- David Caine
- Jasper Caine
- Nava Vaner
- Dr. "Doc" Paul Tversky
- James Forsythe
- Steven Grimes
- Martin Crowe
- Julia Pearlman
- Peter Hanneman
- Vitaly Nikolaev
- Sergey Kozlov
- Yi EGG
