= Probability function =

Probability function may refer to:

- Probability distribution
- Probability axioms, which define a probability function
- Probability measure, a real-valued function on a probability space
- Probability mass function

== See also ==
- Probability distribution function (disambiguation)
