= Probably =

Probably may refer to:

- Probability, the chance that something is likely to happen or be the case
- "Probably" (South Park), an episode of the TV series South Park
- "Probably" (song), a song by Fool's Garden

== See also ==
- Probability (disambiguation)
- Problem (disambiguation)
- Pro (disambiguation)
