= John Rector (writer) =

American novelist

John Rector is a prize-winning short story writer and author of the novels The Cold Kiss and The Grove. He lives in Omaha, Nebraska. The rights for his novels have been sold in North America, the United Kingdom, Germany and the Netherlands among others.
