= Advisory Centre on World Trade Organization Law =

The Advisory Centre on WTO Law (ACWL) is an international organisation established in 2001 to provide legal advice on WTO law, support in WTO dispute settlement proceedings and training in WTO law to least developed countries, developing countries and customs territories, and countries with economies in transition.

The Centre, which is based in Geneva, has 37 Members: 11 developed country Members (Australia joined in 2011), and 27 Members entitled to the services of the ACWL (i.e. developing countries or developing customs territories or economies in transition as listed in Annex II to the Agreement Establishing the Centre). Least developed countries are entitled to the services of the ACWL without having to become Members thereof.

== Legal basis ==
Agreement Establishing the Advisory Centre on WTO Law
- Signed: 30 November 1999
- Location: Seattle
- Effective: 15 July 2001
- Condition: 20 ratifications, including sufficient states that the annual contributions and the once off contributions exceed 6 million Euro
- Signatories: 29
- Parties: 42
- Depositary: Government of the Kingdom of the Netherlands
- Languages: English, French and Spanish

The centre was established by the Agreement Establishing the Advisory Centre on WTO Law, which was concluded in 1999.

== Institutional structure ==
The General Assembly, the Management Board and the Executive Director.

The General Assembly is made up of the ACWL Members and monitors the financial administration of the Centre, adopts its annual budget, and oversees its functioning.

The Management Board is composed of six people who act in their personal capacities: three are nominated by the developing and economy in transition Members, two by developed country ACWL Members, and one by the least developed countries. The Board takes the decisions for the efficient and effective operation of the Centre and reports to the General Assembly.

The Executive Director represents the Centre externally, appoints staff and manages the day-to-day operations of the ACWL. He/she is also ex officio a member of the Management Board.
