= Probability distribution function =

Probability distribution function may refer to:

- Probability distribution, a function that gives the probabilities of occurrence of possible outcomes for an experiment
  - Probability density function, a local differential probability measure for continuous random variables
  - Probability mass function (a.k.a. discrete probability distribution function or discrete probability density function), providing the probability of individual outcomes for discrete random variables
- Cumulative distribution function, the cumulative integral of a probability density function or cumulative sum of a probability mass function

== See also ==
- Frequency (statistics)
- Probability measure
- Probability function (disambiguation)
