= List of Umineko When They Cry episodes =

Wikipedia list page

The cover of the first Japanese DVD compilation released by Geneon Universal Entertainment on October 23, 2009.

Umineko When They Cry is an anime television series, based on the sound novel series of the same name by the Japanese dōjin soft maker 07th Expansion. Produced by Studio Deen, it is directed by Chiaki Kon, written by Toshifumi Kawase, and features character design by Yoko Kikuchi, who based the designs on original creator Ryukishi07's original concept.

The story focuses on a group of eighteen people on a secluded island for a period of two days, and the mysterious murders that befall most of the people. The 26 episodes in the series aired in Japan between July 2 and December 24, 2009, on the Chiba TV broadcasting network and aired on additional stations at later times. Six BD and DVD compilation volumes were released in Japan by Geneon Universal Entertainment between October 23, 2009, and March 25, 2010. The opening theme is "Katayoku no Tori" (片翼の鳥; lit. 'One-Winged Bird') by Akiko Shikata, and the ending theme is "La Divina Tragedia: Makyoku" (la divina tragedia～魔曲～; lit. 'The Divine Tragedy: Demonic Song') by Jimang.

== Episode list ==
No. in series	Title	Directed by	Written by	Original release date
1	"Episode I-I Opening"	Hiroyuki Tsuchiya	Toshifumi Kawase	July 2, 2009
The Ushiromiya family gathers for their annual conference on the island of Rokkenjima, where they discuss the inheritance of the ailing family head, Kinzo. Battler, who has not attended the conference in six years, notices a new painting in the foyer of the mansion. He is told by his cousins George, Jessica, and Maria that it is a portrait of the "Golden Witch" Beatrice, who had supposedly given Kinzo all his wealth, and whom Kinzo desires to see again. Battler does not believe in witches or magic, and doubts Beatrice's existence. A typhoon approaches the island, and Maria is left outside by her mother, Rosa, while searching for a wilted rose George had marked for her in the garden. When it begins to rain, Battler, Jessica, George, the servant Kanon, and Rosa find Maria with an umbrella she did not have before, which Maria says Beatrice gave her.
2	"Episode I-II First Move"	Yutaka Hirata	Toshifumi Kawase	July 9, 2009
During dinner, no one admits to giving Maria her umbrella, leaving them to wonder if there is an additional resident among the eighteen guests. After everyone finishes eating, Maria reads a letter she claims to have received from Beatrice earlier, stating that Beatrice will take everything from the Ushiromiya family if no one can solve the portrait's cryptic epitaph. Later, George proposes to Shannon, and asks her to give her reply the next day by wearing the ring on a finger of her choice. The following morning, Krauss, Rudolf, Rosa, Kyrie, Shannon, and Gohda are missing, and the phone lines are out. Natsuhi is informed of a strange symbol painted in red on the outdoor tool shed. While the others investigate the matter, Battler, Jessica, and George follow to discover the missing people's disfigured corpses inside, with Shannon wearing George's ring on her left ring finger.
3	"Episode I-III Dubious Move"	Kōsuke Kobayashi	Fumihiko Shimo	July 16, 2009
While attempting to figure out what happened, the remaining guests discover that their radio is not working, leaving them stranded on the island with the culprit until the typhoon passes. They quickly discover that Kinzo has gone missing as well. Battler and the rest of the family theorize that one of the eighteen people on the island is posing as Beatrice in an attempt to claim Kinzo's inheritance. The primary suspects are the servants, who have access to the entire mansion; Natsuhi, the last person seen with Kinzo; and Eva, who has the most to gain from the murders. After a heated argument between Natsuhi and Eva, they are unable to come to a definitive answer and return to their rooms. Later, Eva and Hideyoshi are found dead in their locked room with stakes embedded in their foreheads.
4	"Episode I-IV Blunder"	Yasuo Ejima	Fumihiko Shimo	July 23, 2009
The survivors try to determine how Eva and Hideyoshi could have been killed, when an odd smell begins to fill the mansion. Kanon goes to investigate the boiler room along with Kumasawa, and is impaled by a stake that flies into his chest. The rest of the family and staff arrive and discover the dying Kanon as well as Kinzo's incinerated body, and decide to retreat to Kinzo's study. After they enter, a letter from Beatrice mysteriously appears. Since Genji, Nanjo, Kumasawa, or Maria are the only possible suspects for planting the letter, Natsuhi forces them to leave the study. Later that night, the phone rings with Maria singing on the other end. Natsuhi, Battler, George, and Jessica rush downstairs to find Genji, Nanjo, and Kumasawa's disfigured corpses and Maria standing in the corner, still singing.
5	"Episode I-V Fool's Mate"	Tarō Kubo	Toshifumi Kawase	July 30, 2009
Pressed about the murders, Maria tells the survivors that Beatrice is the culprit, though Battler refuses to accept this explanation. As they argue, Natsuhi bars everyone inside the room and demands Beatrice to show herself. By the time everyone breaks out of the room, they see Natsuhi as she drops dead with a bullet wound in her forehead. Golden butterflies soon fill the room, and the remaining survivors are killed. Afterward, everyone appears alive in a white tea room, joking about how they should have solved the epitaph rather than determine who was committing the murders. However, everyone except Battler is convinced that the culprit is a witch. When Battler insists that everything that happened could have been carried out by human means, he is confronted by Beatrice herself, who challenges Battler to prove that the murders were not caused by magic. Later, Beatrice discusses the events she has set into motion with a rival witch, Bernkastel, who plans to lend her own powers to assist Battler.
6	"Episode II-I Middle Game"	Yutaka Hirata	Toshifumi Kawase	August 6, 2009
After one of the family meetings in 1984, Shannon admits to Jessica that she is in love with George. However, Eva tells Shannon that George will be taking part in an arranged marriage to keep him away from her. Devastated, Shannon prays for help from Beatrice, who appears and makes a deal with her: in return for shattering a mirror in the island's shrine that limits her power, Beatrice will guarantee George's love. Shannon initially refuses, but in 1985, she succumbs to temptation and smashes the mirror. In 1986, Jessica confides in Shannon that she has a crush on Kanon. Jessica convinces Kanon to come to her school festival, where Kanon is perplexed at seeing a different side of Jessica in public. However, he refuses to get into any relationship with her. He then confronts Beatrice and accuses her of toying with his and Shannon's emotions. Beatrice laughs and says that no matter what happens, her power will return and the path to the Golden Land will be opened.
7	"Episode II-II Early Queen Move"	Kōsuke Kobayashi	Toshifumi Kawase	August 13, 2009
Battler and Beatrice begin their debate of logic against magic from the meta-world when the Ushiromiya family members gather for their annual conference. During that day, Maria aggravates Rosa by talking about Beatrice and is left outside. When Rosa returns to save Maria from the coming storm, Beatrice appears before them as an important yet anonymous guest, and hands envelopes to both of them. Meanwhile, Shannon discovers Beatrice's devious intentions and decides to resist her. Later, when George proposes to Shannon and asks her to give him her answer by the next day, she accepts immediately. During dinner, the siblings discover their guest to be Beatrice, and eventually come to acknowledge her as a witch.
8	"Episode II-III Weak Square"	Hiroyuki Tsuchiya	Fumihiko Shimo	August 20, 2009
Krauss, Eva, Rudolf, and their spouses go missing, while the remaining guests find the chapel door locked. Rosa finds the chapel key inside the envelope Beatrice gave Maria, and everyone enters to find the missing people murdered inside, along with some of Kinzo's hidden gold. After separating from the others, Jessica and Kanon are ambushed by Beatrice, who summons her legion of goat servants against them. Kanon fights off the goats until Beatrice summons two Stakes of Purgatory, Asmodeus and Satan, who kill Jessica and Kanon. In the meta-world, Battler tries to determine how the first six people could have been murdered inside a locked room. Battler forms several theories, but Beatrice counters most of them, using red text to speak the truth. However, Battler manages to catch Beatrice off guard by theorizing that the culprit could have taken the key from the envelope, locked the dead bodies in the room, and put the key back where it was. Beatrice congratulates Battler, but remains confident that he will submit.
9	"Episode II-IV Skewer"	Masahiko Watanabe	Fumihiko Shimo	August 27, 2009
The survivors find Jessica's body in her locked room, while Kanon's body is nowhere to be found, having been erased by Beatrice. After the notion of Kanon killing Jessica is deterred since he gave Jessica his master key, the other servants are marked as the most likely suspects. Battler, meanwhile, finds himself unable to think of any way the crime could have been carried out while knowing the servants are innocent. Rosa sends the servants off, hoping to use them as bait to draw the culprit out. In the process, the servants stumble across Kanon, severely wounded but apparently still alive, who tells them that Rosa is the one who attacked him. However, it is soon discovered that this Kanon is a duplicate created by Beatrice. The fake Kanon attacks the servants, killing Nanjo and Kumasawa before being destroyed by the other servants.
10	"Episode II-V Accept"	Yutaka Hirata	Toshifumi Kawase	September 3, 2009
The servants try to explain what happened to the others, but when they return to the room where Nanjo and Kumasawa were killed, their bodies are missing. In an effort to gain Rosa's trust, the servants give their master keys to her. Still suspicious, Rosa sends the servants off once again, this time with George deciding to accompany them. Disgusted with Rosa's paranoia, and unwilling to suspect his family and friends, Battler accepts Beatrice as a witch. Meanwhile, the other servants learn about the mirror Shannon smashed, and remember that Natsuhi was in possession of a similar mirror, which they believe should help them. George, Shannon, and Gohda retrieve Natsuhi's room key from her corpse, but are chased by Beatrice and her goat servants along the way. The three manage to enter Natsuhi's room, but Gohda is killed by Beelzebub while he tries to keep the goats at bay, allowing Beatrice to confront George and Shannon herself.
11	"Episode II-VI Back Rank Mate"	Shunji Yoshida	Toshifumi Kawase	September 10, 2009
Empowered by Natsuhi's mirror, Shannon attempts to defend herself and George, but they are both killed by Beatrice. The remaining survivors find Nanjo and Kumasawa's bodies, followed by the bodies of George, Shannon, and Gohda. Rosa suspects Battler after they find another letter, but Battler and Maria blame Beatrice. Rosa and Maria take one of the gold bars from the chapel, leaving Genji to bring Battler before Beatrice herself. In exchange for an explanation of how Beatrice used her magic to commit the crimes, Battler is enslaved and humiliated by the witch before being devoured along with Kinzo by her goat butlers. Rosa and Maria are also ambushed by the goat butlers and killed as they try to escape. In Purgatory, Beatrice tortures Rosa into accepting her as a witch, but Battler stops her, having regained his will to fight. Afterward, Beatrice reveals to Bernkastel that she is aware of her meddling. The two are joined by another witch, Lambdadelta, who seeks to participate in Beatrice's next game against Bernkastel.
12	"Episode III-I Castling"	Tatsuya Abe	Toshifumi Kawase	September 17, 2009
Several years in the past, a young, human Beatrice meets the Golden Witch "Beatrice" preceding her and becomes her apprentice in magic. In 1986, Eva has recurring visions of her younger self claiming to have magic that will allow her to become the family head, which continue to haunt her during the family conference. Maria receives a letter from Beatrice, who is now powerful enough to summon her demonic butler Ronove, and reads it to the guests during dinner. While discussing the contents and writer of the letter among themselves, the siblings talk about a rumor about Kinzo's mistress, a woman named Beatrice, who lived in the forest on the island thirty years ago. Battler theorizes that this human Beatrice is still on the island. However, Rosa confesses to her siblings that she had killed Beatrice.
13	"Episode III-II Gambit"	Kōsuke Kobayashi	Fumihiko Shimo	September 24, 2009
Rosa recounts how she met the human Beatrice confined in a hidden mansion, Kuwadorian, on the island twenty years ago and helped her escape, only to see her accidentally fall off a cliff to her death. Beatrice confirms to Battler that she truly died as a human, and that there are currently no more than 18 people on the island, forcing Battler to accept his loved ones as possible culprits. Genji, Shannon, and Kanon are later summoned to Kinzo's study, where they see Beatrice offer him as the first sacrifice and kill him. Kanon is pitted against the seven Sisters of Purgatory, defeating Lucifer in a duel, though he and Shannon are overwhelmed as they try to fend them all off at once, prompting Genji to euthanize Shannon and Kanon before he is put to rest by Ronove. The Sisters search the mansion for more sacrifices, killing Gohda in the process. They then find Kumasawa, who claims to have been waiting for Beatrice. Beatrice identifies Kumasawa as her predecessor and teacher, the former Beatrice.
14	"Episode III-III Positional Play"	Hiroyuki Tsuchiya	Toshifumi Kawase	October 1, 2009
Beatrice and her predecessor engage in a magic battle, though a surprise attack allows Beatrice to kill her teacher. Battler is bewildered by the spectacle, but regains his composure when the former Beatrice, renaming herself Virgilia, reappears and gives him advice for countering Beatrice's claims, allowing him to deny that the witches' battle ever took place. In the real world, the siblings discover the bodies of Kinzo and the servants, each locked in a room containing the key to the next locked room, forming one large locked room. With Virgilia's guidance, Battler theorizes that one of the six victims is the murderer, created five of the locked rooms, and then died in an accident in the sixth room, forcing Beatrice to concede the round. Meanwhile, Eva, urged on by the vision of her younger self, solves the riddle of Beatrice's epitaph and discovers Kinzo's hidden gold.
15	"Episode III-IV Isolated Pawn"	Yutaka Hirata	Fumihiko Shimo	October 8, 2009
Eva is discovered by Rosa and leaves to discuss how Kinzo's gold should be divided among the siblings. The younger Eva, however, refuses to share the gold and remains behind, declaring herself to be the head of the Ushiromiya family. Acknowledging Eva's achievement, Beatrice appears and dubs her the new "Beatrice", whom Battler deems to be an alter ego for the real Eva. Later, Eva falls ill, and Rosa takes a whining Maria outside to spare Eva from her tantrum. They are suddenly attacked by Eva Beatrice, who tortures them by killing them in bizarre ways and resurrecting them repeatedly. Beatrice is amused by the carnage, enraging Battler, who refuses to play with her any longer. Dejected, Beatrice confronts Eva Beatrice and mercifully kills Rosa and Maria, ordering her successor to act more dignified and reasonable in the future.
16	"Episode III-V Queening Square"	Takeshi Yoshimoto	Toshifumi Kawase	October 15, 2009
After the bodies of Rosa and Maria are found, Rudolf, Kyrie, and Hideyoshi go to retrieve food from the mansion, only to be trapped inside by Eva Beatrice. Two Stakes of Purgatory, Leviathan and Belphegor, are sent to kill Rudolf and Kyrie, though the couple manage to outmaneuver and defeat them. Eva Beatrice summons more powerful servants, the Chiester Sisters, who successfully kill Rudolf and Kyrie. Hideyoshi confronts Eva Beatrice, but is killed by her as well. Beatrice berates Eva Beatrice for ignoring her advice, but Eva Beatrice tells her off, revealing she knows that acting dignified is only a means for Beatrice to get back in Battler's good graces in Purgatory. Battler is convinced to continue playing with Beatrice if he is to make any progress, though he still refuses to forgive her. Virgilia, meanwhile, meets with Beatrice and encourages her to act more passively if she is to make Battler accept witches.
17	"Episode III-VI Promotion"	Kōsuke Kobayashi	Fumihiko Shimo	October 22, 2009
After Battler gives her another chance to change her ways, Beatrice goes to the real world to visit George, who is still grieving over Shannon's death, and offers to bring Shannon back to life despite her own diminished powers. With George's assistance, she manages to resurrect Shannon. Sensing this, Eva Beatrice kills George and Shannon shortly after they reunite, and then kills Krauss and Natsuhi. Shortly after the survivors discover the bodies, Jessica accuses Eva of being the culprit. Eva panics and accidentally fires her rifle at Jessica, blinding her with the muzzle flash. While Nanjo escorts Jessica away to treat her, Jessica insists he go back to keep Battler out of danger, but Nanjo is killed by Eva Beatrice before he can, leaving Jessica completely defenseless.
18	"Episode III-VII Swindles"	Yasuo Ejima	Toshifumi Kawase	October 29, 2009
Beatrice resurrects Kanon's spirit for Jessica and defends her against Eva Beatrice. Battler brings Eva Beatrice into Purgatory to challenge her; with Beatrice's assistance, Battler theorizes that the real Eva is the culprit, but is unable to explain how Nanjo could have been killed, since Jessica was blind and he himself was with Eva. Battler nearly surrenders until Beatrice uses the red truth to deny the existence of witches and destroy Eva Beatrice, leaving the emotionally unstable Eva to kill Battler and escape Rokkenjima. Battler is brought to the Golden Land, where Beatrice and Virgilia reveal their deception and attempt to force Battler to accept the existence of witches by signing a contract. Battler is saved by his sister Ange who, twelve years in the future, had been dispatched by Bernkastel to begin a new game. Afterward, Lambdadelta orders Beatrice to keep winning so that she may be with Bernkastel for eternity. In the year 1998, the resentful, dying Eva grants Ange the name "Beatrice" and the Ushiromiya family headship and fortune. Hoping to find out what really happened to her family in 1986, Ange meets Bernkastel and accepts her offer to save them from Beatrice.
19	"Episode IV-I End Game"	Rion Kujō	Toshifumi Kawase	November 5, 2009
Between 1986 and 1998, Eva sends Ange to boarding school at St. Lucia Academy, where she is bullied by her classmates. Between classes, Ange learns about magic from Maria, whose soul is kept alive in her old diary. Maria shows Ange how she was often neglected by Rosa and forced to care for herself with Sakutaro, a stuffed lion doll made by Rosa and brought to life by Maria. In 1998, Ange discovers that she is being hunted for her fortune by her aunt Kasumi, Kyrie's sister, and escapes with assistance from her bodyguard, Amakusa. In Purgatory, Ange becomes Battler's ally under the name "Gretel". To make the game more fair, Ange convinces Beatrice to let Battler use blue text for when he makes his theories. During the 1986 conference, Kyrie theorizes that Kinzo is already dead, which is why none of them except for Krauss and Natsuhi have supposedly seen him, and that there are actually seventeen people on the island. Battler adopts this theory and states it in blue, but after Krauss and Natsuhi are sent by Kyrie to prove that Kinzo is alive, Kinzo agrees to attend the family conference and settle the argument himself.
20	"Episode IV-II Zugzwang"	Yutaka Hirata	Fumihiko Shimo	November 12, 2009
Ange briefly withdraws from Beatrice's game to confront Maria over her denial of being neglected by Rosa, but Maria tells her that she is content with Sakutaro ensuring her mother's love. Beatrice decides to show Ange how she, upon noticing how Maria created a soul for Sakutaro, gave a human body to Sakutaro and named Maria the Witch of Origins, joining forces with her in a witch's alliance called Mariage Sorcière. Ange recounts how she was also once a member of this alliance and learned how to summon the seven Sisters of Purgatory, becoming close friends with Mammon. In 1998, however, she has lost the ability to use magic, and continues her investigation of the Rokkenjima murders. Before she returns to the game, Ange is confronted by Lambdadelta, who tells her that if Battler defeats Beatrice, he will return to her past self in 1986 while her current self will remain alone, and proposes that Ange can remain with her brother if he continues to fight against Beatrice for eternity.
21	"Episode IV-III Prophylaxis"	Tatsuya Abe	Toshifumi Kawase	November 19, 2009
During her years at St. Lucia Academy, Ange is distracted from her studies by Maria, Sakutaro, and the Sisters of Purgatory, and is humiliated by her classmates after failing a test. Ange lashes out against her magical friends for their helplessness against her classmates' resistance to magic, denouncing them all as illusions. Inside the world of her diary, Maria accidentally locks herself out of her house with Sakutaro while Rosa is away on vacation with her boyfriend. Upon returning and being confronted by child services, Rosa takes her anger out on Maria and destroys Sakutaro, whom Beatrice is unable to resurrect as Rosa created his vessel and has denied his existence. Distraught, Maria demands to learn magic to kill Rosa and avenge Sakutaro. In 1998, Ange finally comprehends what Maria tried to teach her about magic and apologizes to her magical friends, whom she is still able to summon, hoping to atone for what she did to Maria.
22	"Episode IV-IV Problem Child"	Hiroyuki Tsuchiya	Tatsushi Moriya	November 26, 2009
Kinzo appears at the family conference and denounces his children as being unfit to succeed him as the head of the Ushiromiya family. Deciding that his grandchildren may be more suitable successors, Kinzo summons the Chiester Sisters to select the first six sacrifices for his ceremony to revive Beatrice (Natsuhi, Eva, Hideyoshi, Rudolf, Rosa, and Genji), while the survivors (Krauss, Kyrie, Shannon, Kanon, and Nanjo) are imprisoned in the dungeon of Kuwadorian by the demon Gaap. In the world of her diary, Maria has her revenge against Rosa for destroying Sakutaro by repeatedly killing her while Beatrice revives her, fully realizing her own potential as a witch. Gohda and Kumasawa, who survived the slaughter and escaped capture, inform the cousins in the guesthouse about what happened when they receive a phone call from the hostages telling them to stay in the guesthouse until Kinzo makes preparations to test his grandchildren for the family headship.
23	"Episode IV-V Breakthrough"	Kōsuke Kobayashi	Fumihiko Shimo	December 3, 2009
In 1998, Ange interrogates relatives of the Rokkenjima murder victims and hires a boat captain to take her to Rokkenjima; in the captain's house, she discovers a bag filled with lion dolls identical to Sakutaro. In 1986, the cousins are informed of Kinzo's test from the hostages in Kuwadorian and are forced to lock Gohda and Kumasawa in the storehouse to keep them from interfering. Jessica and George are individually tested by Ronove and Gaap, respectively, and instructed to choose which of the islanders will be next to die: themselves, their true loves (Shannon for George and Kanon for Jessica), or everyone else. Jessica chooses herself for Kanon's sake so that he may live his life to the fullest, while George chooses everyone else as he is willing to go so far for his love for Shannon to be accepted. Unwilling to leave the hostages in the dungeon, however, Jessica and George defiantly engage their respective proctors in combat.
24	"Episode IV-VI Adjourn"	Yutaka Hirata	Toshifumi Kawase	December 10, 2009
Gaap teleports Jessica and George into each other, killing them both as their magically-empowered attacks collide. Temporarily resurrected by Ronove, Jessica calls Battler at the guesthouse to warn him of their enemies' magic. Meanwhile, the hostages are able to break out of Kuwadorian, but are killed off until only Kyrie remains. Before she is also killed, Kyrie calls Battler and tells him to believe in witches. Afterward, Maria leaves to take her test when Battler receives another phone call, this time from Beatrice herself, and goes to confront her, discovering Gohda and Kumasawa hanged in the storehouse along the way. Beatrice tests Battler with remembering a sin he committed six years ago; however, Battler is clueless as to what that may be, and Beatrice takes her frustration out on Kinzo by killing him. Losing interest in the game, Beatrice decides to abandon it by deeming Battler unqualified to be her opponent, revealing that his birth mother is not Rudolf's first wife Asumu as he had believed, and claiming that he is not Kinzo's grandson Battler, the only one eligible to fight her. Questioning his own identity, Battler fades away, and Beatrice retires to the Golden Land with Maria.
25	"Episode IV-VII Forced Move"	Yasuo Ejima	Fumihiko Shimo	December 17, 2009
In 1998, Ange arrives at Rokkenjima and continues on alone with Mammon and Sakutaro, only to be ambushed by Kasumi and her men, who proceed to beat and taunt her mercilessly, and destroy Maria's diary. Noticing that Kasumi is being manipulated by the spirit of Eva Beatrice, Ange miraculously summons the Sisters of Purgatory despite the large amount of magical resistance present, killing Kasumi and her men. Before vanishing, Eva Beatrice resurrects the human Eva to shoot and kill Ange, though Mammon destroys her gun, allowing Ange to kill Eva and overcome her own anger towards her. Ange meets with Bernkastel, who confirms that she is nothing more than a piece in the game between Battler and Beatrice. However, Ange remains determined to save her family.
26	"Episode IV-VIII Sacrifice"	Tarō Kubo	Toshifumi Kawase	December 24, 2009
Ange enters the Golden Land, where she reunites Maria with Sakutaro and forces Beatrice to continue the game. Battler, however, has lost his soul due to his uncertainty of his own identity. Desperate to revive Battler, Ange confirms his qualifications as Kinzo's grandson and reveals herself as his sister to him, restoring him. Having broken the rule to keep her identity a secret, Ange dies. With Battler's resolve strengthened, Beatrice concedes to a final confrontation with him. Kinzo's spirit appears to protect Beatrice, but Battler dispels him by confirming his death in every game thus far; however, Beatrice confirms in red that there are no more than seventeen people on Rokkenjima. Nevertheless, Battler provides explanations for four games through human means, skewering Beatrice with blue spikes. Unable to die, Beatrice begs Battler to kill her and presents him with a mystery: since Battler is the only person left alive on the island, and yet Beatrice is also there to kill him, Beatrice asks, "Who am I?" Understanding her plight, Battler promises to solve her final mystery and kill her. Bernkastel and Lambdadelta, however, intend to keep Beatrice trapped in the game, torturing her for eternity.

== Home media ==
=== DVD and Blu-ray ===
Volume	Release date	Publisher	Content	Catalogue No. (DVD)			Catalogue No. (Blu-ray)	
Volume	Release date	Publisher	Content	First press	Special edition	Regular edition	First press	Regular edition
1	October 23, 2009	Frontier Works (JP)	Episodes 1-2	FCBP-0115	FG-8016	FCBP-0128	FCXP-0006	FCXP-0019
2	November 26, 2009	Frontier Works (JP)	Episodes 3-4	FCBP-0116	FG-8017	FCBP-0129	FCXP-0007	FCXP-0020
3	December 23, 2009	Frontier Works (JP)	Episodes 5-6	FCBP-0117	FG-8018	FCBP-0130	FCXP-0008	FCXP-0021
4	January 22, 2010	Frontier Works (JP)	Episodes 7-8	FCBP-0118	FG-8019	FCBP-0131	FCXP-0009	FCXP-0022
5	February 24, 2010	Frontier Works (JP)	Episodes 9-10	FCBP-0119	FG-8020	FCBP-0132	FCXP-0010	FCXP-0023
6	March 25, 2010	Frontier Works (JP)	Episodes 11-12	FCBP-0120	FG-8021	FCBP-0133	FCXP-0011	FCXP-0024
7	April 21, 2010	Frontier Works (JP)	Episodes 13-14	FCBP-0121	FG-8022	FCBP-0134	FCXP-0012	FCXP-0025
8	May 26, 2010	Frontier Works (JP)	Episodes 15-16	FCBP-0122	FG-8023	FCBP-0135	FCXP-0013	FCXP-0026
9	June 23, 2010	Frontier Works (JP)	Episodes 17-18	FCBP-0123	FG-8024	FCBP-0136	FCXP-0014	FCXP-0027
10	July 22, 2010	Frontier Works (JP)	Episodes 19-20	FCBP-0124	FG-8025	FCBP-0137	FCXP-0015	FCXP-0028
11	August 25, 2010	Frontier Works (JP)	Episodes 21-22	FCBP-0125	FG-8026	FCBP-0138	FCXP-0016	FCXP-0029
12	September 23, 2010	Frontier Works (JP)	Episodes 23-24	FCBP-0126	FG-8027	FCBP-0139	FCXP-0017	FCXP-0030
13	October 22, 2010	Frontier Works (JP)	Episodes 25-26	FCBP-0127	FG-8028	FCBP-0140	FCXP-0018	FCXP-0031

DVD set
Volume	Release date	Publisher	Episodes	Catalogue No.
I	May 26, 2010	Frontier Works (JP)	Episodes 1-8	FCBP-9013
II	August 25, 2010	Frontier Works (JP)	Episodes 9-16	FCBP-9014
III	October 22, 2010	Frontier Works (JP)	Episodes 17-26	FCBP-9015

Blu-ray set
Volume	Release date	Publisher	Episodes	Catalogue No.
I	December 4, 2012	NIS America (US)	Episodes 1-18	NIS-UMIB1201
II	December 4, 2012	NIS America (US)	Episodes 19-26	NIS-UMIB1202
