= Killer Instinct (novel) =

2006 novel by Joseph Finder

- First edition (US)
- Author: Joseph Finder
- Genre: Thriller Novel
- Publisher: St. Martin's Press (US); Orion (UK)
- Publication date: May 2006

Killer Instinct is a thriller novel written by Joseph Finder published in May 2006 by Orion Publishing Group. It debuted at #13 on the New York Times bestseller list with competition from The Da Vinci Code and won the International Thriller Writers Award for Best Novel in 2007.

== Plot ==
Jason Steadman is a thirty-year-old salesman, modest and industrious, who loves his wife Kate very much and wants to succeed in his work. But, as his boss makes clear to him, Steadman lacks "Killer Instinct" - the limitless ambition that will allow him to climb the ranks. Everything changes when Steadman meets Kurt Semko, a special forces combat soldier who has just returned from the Iraq war. From that moment, Steadman's luck improves remarkably, while his opponents encounter a strange succession of serious mishaps. Steadman's career is picking up, but the price he pays is very expensive. As a double-edged sword, Semko's fighting tactics turn to him and turn his life into hell.
