= Emotional safety =

Mental state

In psychology, emotional safety refers to an emotional state achieved in attachment relationships wherein each individual is open and vulnerable. The concept is primarily used by couples' therapists to describe intimate relationships. When a relationship is emotionally safe, the partners trust each other and routinely give each other the benefit of the doubt in questionable situations. When emotional safety is lost, the partners are inclined to be distrustful, looking for possible hidden meanings and potential threats in each other's words and behaviors.

== Origins ==
The emotional safety model of couples therapy was developed by psychologist Don R. Catherall. The model focuses on the two realms of "attachment" and "esteem", contending that each partner measures their safety by their perception of the other partner's feelings in these two realms. If each perceives the other partner to be securely attached and each holds the other high regard, they feel emotionally safe. But if one perceives threat in either realm, then he or she will lose emotional safety and may react. If he or she reacts in a negative fashion (usually by either attacking or distancing from the partner), then said reaction can constitute a threat to the other partner's emotional safety. If the other partner responds in a similarly negative fashion, a vicious cycle may begin in which each partner's reaction to a perceived threat creates a reciprocal threat to the other partner. Once caught in these cycles, partners have considerable difficulty re-achieving emotional safety.

== Evidence ==
Research on couples has identified a sudden, abrupt shift in physiological functioning (the fight-or-flight response) that occurs when a partner suddenly perceives something amiss in the intimate relationship. Proponents of the emotional safety model contend that these shifts are precipitated by a partner's perception of change in the other's affective tone regarding their emotional relationship (i.e. the partners' feelings about themselves, each other, and their relationship).

== Theoretical foundation ==
The emotional safety model utilizes the affect theory of Silvan Tomkins to explain the ways in which partners influence each other through their affective tone. Attachment is based on attachment relationships as identified by John Bowlby, while esteem is based on Nathaniel Branden's work on self-esteem and Donald Nathanson's work on shame.

== Implications ==
The emotional safety model differs from other models of couples' therapy in its emphasis on each partner's perception of the other's feelings regarding the emotional relationship. The model emphasizes that each partner has more influence on the other partner's state of emotional safety than on their own, which can lead to an impasse referred to as the "couple's conundrum"; i.e. the couple remains stuck because each partner needs to feel safe before they can make themselves vulnerable and take the appropriate steps to make the other partner feel safe.

Emotional safety in the workplace was first introduced in the best-selling book by Henry Evans and Colm Foster, PhD, "Step Up: Lead in Six Moments that Matter". An emotionally safe organization makes informed decisions and solves problems faster, reduces attrition and increases retention of top talent, makes people feel safe and appreciated, even when delivering bad news, and established a cultural environment where people can communicate effectively and develop personally and professionally.
