= C. J. Lyons =

American physician and writer

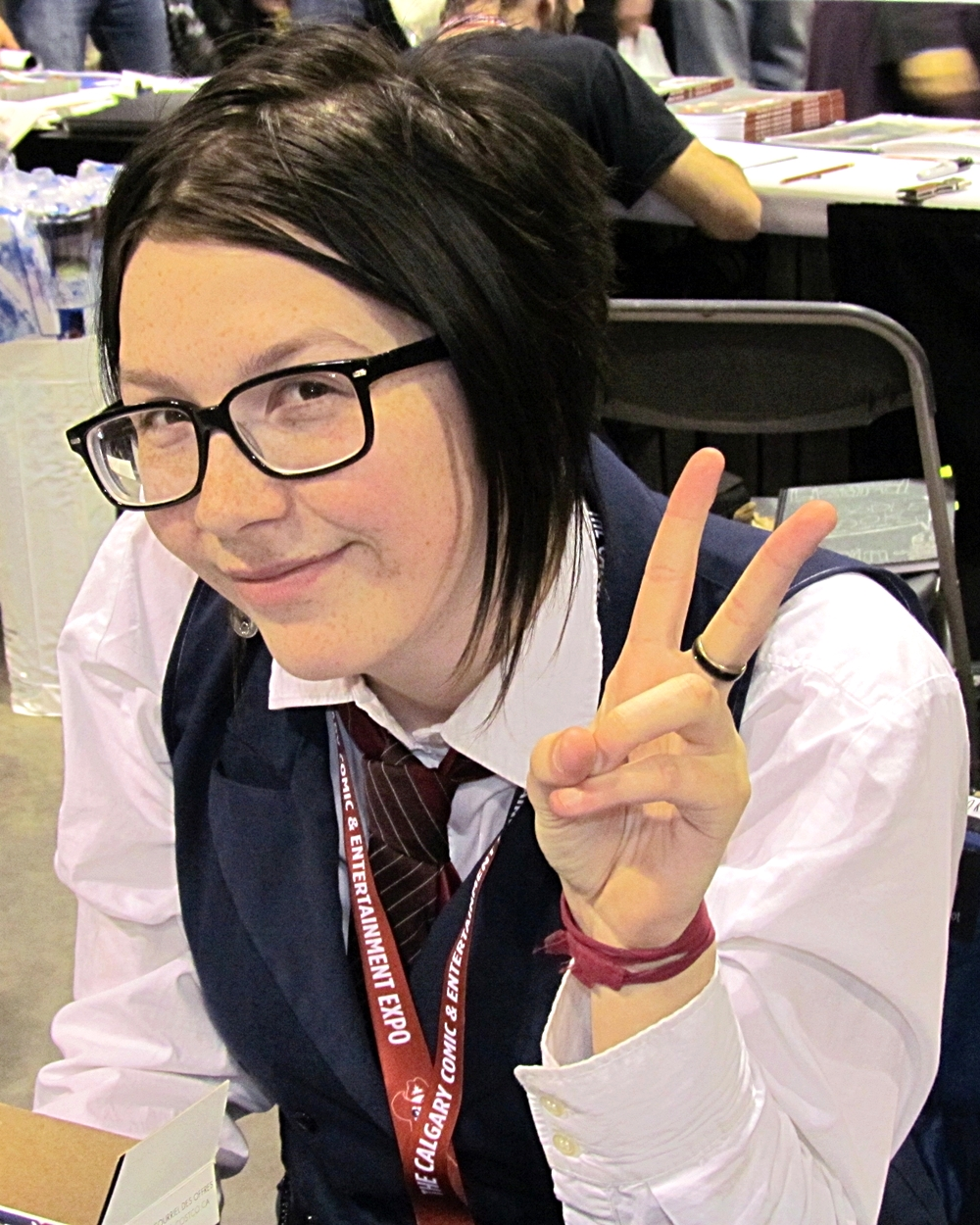
- Lyons c. 2012
- Education: University of Florida
- Occupations: Physician, Author
- Website: cjlyons.net

C. J. Lyons, also known as Cat Lyons, is an American physician and writer of medical suspense novels.

== Biography ==
Lyons was raised in the Pennsylvania municipality known as State College, and attended medical school at the University of Florida. She did her internship and residency at UPMC Children's Hospital of Pittsburgh, followed by a fellowship in Pediatric Emergency Medicine at Akron Children's Hospital. She has held teaching appointments at the Medical College of Ohio and the Penn State Milton S. Hershey Medical Center. She worked as a general pediatrician focusing on community health care.

In 2008 she published Snake Skin, which includes the hero Lucy Guardino who is a Pittsburgh soccer mum who is employed by the FBI in their Sexual Assault Felony Enforcement Squad. Further books in that series include Bloodstained and Kill Zone.

== Awards ==
- From The Heart Romance Writers of America, Winner of Golden Gateway Contest in Romantic Suspense
- 2015 International Thriller Writers Award for Best E-Book original, for Hard Fall
- 2013 International Thriller Writers Award for Best E-Book original, for Blind Faith

== Bibliography ==
=== Angels of Mercy series ===
1. Lifelines. Berkley Books. 2008. ISBN 9780425220825.
2. Warning Signs. 2009. ISBN 9780515145830.
3. Catalyst. Edgy Reads. 2009.
4. Urgent Care. 2009.
5. Critical Condition. 2010.
6. Trauma. Edgy Reads. 2009.
7. Isolation. Edgy Reads. 2010.

=== Beacon Falls series ===
The Beacon Falls books feature Lucy Guardino.

1. Last Light. Edgy Reads. 2016. ISBN 978-1-9390-3839-5.
2. Devil Smoke. Edgy Reads. 2016.
3. Open Grave. Edgy Reads. 2016.
4. Gone Dark. Edgy Reads. 2017.
5. Bitter Truth. Edgy Reads. 2018. ISBN 978-1-93903874-6.
6. Lesser Evil. Edgy Reads. 2020.

=== Caitlyn Tierney series ===
1. Blind Faith. Minotaur Books. 2012. ISBN 9781250014603.
2. Black Sheep. Minotaur Books. 2013. ISBN 9781250015341.
3. Hollow Bones. Minotaur Books. 2013. ISBN 9781250015372.

=== Fatal Insomnia series ===
- Farewell to Dreams. Legacy. 2014. ISBN 978-1-93903811-1.
- A Raging Dawn
- The Sleepless Stars

=== Hart and Drake series ===
- Nerves of Steel
- Sleight of Hand
- Face to Face
- Eye of the Storm

=== Lucy Guardino series ===
- Snake Skin. Edgy Reads. 2010.
- Blood Stained. Edgy Reads. 2012.
- Kill Zone. Edgy Reads. 2012. ISBN 9781939038029.
- After Shock. Edgy Reads. 2012.
- Hard Fall. Edgy Reads. 2014.
- Bad Break. Edgy Reads. 2015.

=== Renegade Justice series ===
- Fight Dirty. Thomas & Mercer. 2014.
- Raw Edges. Edgy Reads. 2016.
- Angels Weep. Edgy Reads. 2017.
- Look Away. Edgy Reads. 2017.
- Trip Wire. Edgy Reads. 2018.

=== Shadow Ops series ===
- Chasing Shadows
- Lost in Shadows
- Edge of Shadows

=== Standalone novels ===
- Hot Water. Co-written with Erin Brockovich. Perseus. 2011. ISBN 978-1-59315-684-8.
- Rock Bottom. Co-written with Erin Brockovich. Perseus. 2011. ISBN 978-1-59315-625-1.
- Watched. Sourcebooks/Fire. 2014.
- The Color of Lies. Blink. 2018. ISBN 9780310765356.

=== Tombstone Digs series ===
- In Memory
