= Nataša Petrović =

Macedonian actress (born 1988)

- Born: Nataša Petrović; 31 August 1988 (age 38); Štip, SR Macedonia, SFR Yugoslavia (now North Macedonia)
- Education: St. Cyril and Methodius University
- Occupation: Actress
- Years active: 2007–present

Nataša Petrović (Macedonian: Наташа Петровиќ; Serbian Cyrillic: Наташа Петровић; born 31 August 1988), also known as Natasha Petrovic, is a Macedonian actress of Serbian descent. She made her on–screen debut in 2007 Macedonian film Shadows by Milčo Mančevski, and reached a worldwide success with 2010 film As If I Am Not There by Juanita Wilson, which was selected as the Irish entry for the Best Foreign Language Film at the 84th Academy Awards.

== Career ==
Petrovic made her on–screen debut with a small role in Shadows, a 2007 Macedonian film directed by Milčo Mančevski. In 2009, she landed the lead role in Irish film As If I Am Not There, directed by Juanita Wilson, which premiered in 2010. Although most of the film was shot in Serbo-Croatian language, it was selected as the Irish entry for the Best Foreign Language Film at the 84th Academy Awards. As If I Am Not There garnered positive reviews, while Petrovic's personal performance earned her Seattle International Film Festival Award for Best Actress, as well as the Irish Film and Television Award for Best International Actress and Milan International Film Festival Award for Best Acting Performance – Female nominations.

At the 61st Berlin International Film Festival, Petrovic was one of ten European actors — including Andrea Riseborough, Clara Lago, Alexander Fehling, and Domhnall Gleeson — that were presented the Shooting Stars Award by the European Film Promotion. American magazine Variety also named her as one of the most promising actresses today. In 2011, Petrovic made her stage debut as Célimène in The Misanthrope by Molière. The same year, she played Elikia in The Sound of Cracking Bones by Suzanne Lebeau.

In 2012 she took part in the film The Piano Room directed by Igor Ivanov - Izi where she plays the leading woman role that premiered at Manaki Film Festival 2013 and also the film To The Hilt directed by the Academy Award Nominee Stole Popov, that premiered 2014 at the Manaki Film Festival. In 2013 she played the role Katerina in the feature film Lazar directed by Svetozar Ristovski that had a premiere in 2015. Natasha was also the leading women role in the feature film Elixir shot in Berlin, directed by Brodie Higgs, playing the role of Lexia. This film premiered at the Berlinale in 2015 having a world premiere. She later played Ines in the feature film The Witness, directed by Mitko Panov, where she played alongside Bruno Ganz.

In 2018 she played the role of Milica in the German TV series Pagan Peak (Der Pass).

Her latest film Only Human by Igor Ivanov, where she plays the role of Keti, had premiere in 2020.

== Personal life ==
Petrovic speaks in Macedonian, Serbian, English, Bosnian, German, Bulgarian, Italian and Spanish. She has been studying drama at the St. Cyril and Methodius University since 2007, and is expected to graduate in 2011. Petrovic has been compared to the triple Academy Award winner Ingrid Bergman for her beauty and talent.

== Filmography ==
Year	Title	Role	Notes
2007	Shadows	Dea	Senki
2010	As If I Am Not There	Samira	European Film Promotion Shooting Stars Award; Seattle International Film Festival Award for Best Actress; Nominated – Irish Film and Television Award for Best International Actress; Nominated – Milan International Film Festival Award for Best Acting Performance – Female
2013	The Piano Room	Maid	
2013	In Absentia	Eva Serafimova	Short
2014	To the Hilt	Marija	
2015	Elixir	Lexia	
2015	Lazar	Katerina	
2015	Skora	Sash	Short
2017	Secret from the Past	Hana	
2017	The Children Will Come	Velika	Short
2018	The Witness	Ines Radin	
2019	Der Pass (a.k.a. Pagan Peak)	Milica Andov	TV series
2019	Ashes	Nadya	Short
2020	Only Human	Keti	
2020	Prespav	Natali	TV series

== Stage credits ==
Title	Year	Role	Production
The B.B. Orchestra	2010		The Theatra Theatre Skopje
The Puppet Ship	2010		The Independent Theatre Wonderland Skopje
Railway for the Icy Spring	2010		The Jewish Community of Macedonia
The Misanthrope	2011	Célimène	The Theatra Theatre Skopje
The Sound of Cracking Bones	2011	Elikia	The Theatra Theatre Skopje
Life is a Dream	2012		The Macedonian National Theatre Skopje
Oliver Twist	2013		Theatre for Children and Youth Skopje
Endless Dreams	2014		Theatre for Children and Youth Skopje
Our Class	2014		Theatre for Children and Youth Skopje
Mowgli	2014		Theatre for Children and Youth Skopje
A Trip Around the World	2014		Theatre for Children and Youth Skopje
The Animal Farm	2014		Theatre for Children and Youth Skopje
Sleeping Mind Gives Birth to Monsters or Today I Did Not Write a Word	2015		Theatre for Children and Youth Skopje
Peter Pan	2016		Theatre for Children and Youth Skopje
Cinderella	2016		Theatre for Children and Youth Skopje
Say Hi and Blow Me	2016		Artopia Skopje
Terezin	2017	Alexi	The Steinberg Theater Group New York
Once Upon a Time I Built a World	2018		Theatre for Children and Youth Skopje
The Dream of William	2018		Theatre for Children and Youth Skopje
THE SEE(I)T	2018		Artopia Skopje
Rancidness	2018		Artopia Skopje
Tom Sawyer	2019		Theatre for Children and Youth Skopje
Edward Scissorhands	2019		Theatre for Children and Youth Skopje
Cassette	2019		Theatre for Children and Youth Skopje
Cocoon	2020		Artopia Skopje

== Awards and nominations ==
Award	Year	Category	Nominated work	Result
Shooting Stars Awards	2011	Shooting Star	—	Won
Irish Film and Television Awards	2011	Best International Actress	As If I Am Not There	Nominated
Milan International Film Festival Awards	2011	Best Acting Performance – Female	As If I Am Not There	Nominated
Seattle International Film Festival Awards	2011	Best Actress	As If I Am Not There	Won
Mostar Film Festival Awards	2016	Best Supporting Actress	Lazar	Won
Macedonian Theatre Festival „Vojdan Černodrinski“ Prilep	2018	Best Supporting Actress	Once Upon a Time I Built a World	Won
