= Piano Room =

Piano Room may refer to:

- Piano Room, 1982 cassette by Bryn Jones
- "Piano Room", a song by Jay Chou from the 2007 album Secret
- The Piano Room, 2013 Macedonian drama film
