= James Ross (American author) =

American novelist

James Ross (1911–1990) was an American fiction author. His only published book, They Don't Dance Much (1940), is an early example of what Daniel Woodrell identifies as "country noir", or a noir novel with a rural setting.

== Life ==
James Ross was born in rural Stanly County, North Carolina, in 1911. He briefly worked as a writer for the Savannah Morning News and then for the Greensboro Daily News (now News & Record), covering North Carolina politics and legislation. He died in 1990.

Ross's first novel was published in 1940. His follow-up novel, In the Red, was never published, and Ross turned to writing short fiction for magazines like Collier's, The Sewanee Review and Argosy. In 1970, he became a highly regarded literary agent, and 1975 saw the reissue of They Don’t Dance Much, which saw the book become truly popular for the first time.

== They Don't Dance Much ==
The novel is set in a Western North Carolina roadhouse in the fictional crossroads town of Corinth. It is narrated by a failed farmer who, upon taking a job at a filling station, becomes involved in a murder.

The novel, despite being praised by authors such as Raymond Chandler, William Gay, and Flannery O'Connor, has been largely forgotten. In part, this is due to its tumultuous publication history; since its release, the book has been printed by five different publishers, most recently by Mysterious Press.
