= Mathieu Lamboley =

French pianist and composer

Mathieu Lamboley is a French film composer born in Les Lilas. He is the brother of actress Juliette Lamboley.

== Studies and career ==
He studied at the Conservatoire national supérieur de musique et de danse de Paris, where he received five first prizes (harmony, counterpoint, fugue and form, orchestration, and piano).

He began his career in film music as an orchestrator, collaborating notably with Grégoire Hetzel on A Christmas Tale by Arnaud Desplechin (in competition for the Palme d'Or at the 2008 Cannes Film Festival). In 2004, he wrote his first film score for Les oreilles n'ont pas de paupières by Étienne Chaillou, an animated short film which received the Grand Prix for Best Sound Creation at the Aubagne International Film Festival in 2005.

In 2006, he was selected by ASCAP to participate in the Film Music Workshop in Los Angeles, where he recorded and conducted one of his symphonic pieces with the Hollywood orchestra. He worked with Hans Zimmer and James Newton Howard, who encouraged him to write for cinema.

Inspired by Ravel, Debussy, Stravinsky and John Williams, Lamboley has since collaborated on numerous projects for cinema, television and advertising with directors including Jonny Campbell, Julie Delpy,Louis Leterrier, Guillaume Canet, Emmanuel Carrère, Yvan Attal, Pascal Chaumeil, Antonin Peretjatko and Laurent Tirard.

He composed the score for Minuscule 2: Mandibles from Far Away by Hélène Giraud and Thomas Szabo, performed by the Orchestre national d'Île-de-France which he conducted for the occasion. The score was widely praised by critics.

In 2019, he was the only French composer nominated at the World Soundtrack Awards (Public Choice category).

In 2020, he received two nominations from the International Film Music Critics Association (IFMCA), alongside composers such as John Powell, Christophe Beck and Dan Levy, and won the UCMF Award for Best Score for an Animated Film.

In 2021, he composed the score for the Netflix global hit series Lupin, starring Omar Sy, Ludivine Sagnier, Clotilde Hesme and Nicole Garcia, blending orchestral music with hip-hop rhythms. The series became one of Netflix's most-watched non-English language shows worldwide. He composed all and is currently working on the next one.

Also in 2021, Yvan Attal chose him to compose the score for The Accusation, an adaptation of the novel by Karine Tuil, presented at the Venice Film Festival and the Deauville American Film Festival.

The film Ouistreham by Emmanuel Carrère was presented at the Cannes Film Festival in 2021, opening the Directors' Fortnight. Carrère called upon Lamboley to compose a score inspired by American minimalist music.

In 2023, he received the Grand Prix SACEM for film music, the most prestigious French distinction in the field.

Internationally, he composed the score for Cold Storage directed by Jonny Campbell, starring Liam Neeson, Joe Keery and Georgina Campbell, on a screenplay by David Koepp (Jurassic Park, Mission: Impossible), released in February 2026.

He also composed the score for the successful German Netflix series Cassandra, created by Benjamin Gutsche and produced by Christian Becker and Amara Palacios, released in 2025, for which he received a nomination for Best Music at the Deutscher Fernsehpreis.

In 2026, L'Affaire Bojarski by Jean-Paul Salomé was released, featuring a score by Lamboley drawing on musique concrète — recording the sounds of a banknote printing press — and influenced by film noir, with a theme performed on alto and soprano saxophone.

== Filmography ==
=== Film ===
- 2004: Les oreilles n'ont pas de paupières — Étienne Chaillou (short film)
- 2009: L'Apparition de la Joconde — François Lunel
- 2011: Nos résistances — Romain Cogitore
- 2014: Macadam Baby — Patrick Bossard
- 2014: Libre et assoupi — Benjamin Guedj
- 2015: Toute Première Fois — Noémie Saglio & Maxime Govare
- 2015: Lolo — Julie Delpy
- 2016: Un petit boulot — Pascal Chaumeil
- 2017: Garde alternée — Alexandra Leclère
- 2017: Daddy Cool — Maxime Govare
- 2017: Bonne Pomme — Florence Quentin
- 2017: Boule et Bill 2 — Pascal Bourdiaux
- 2018: Return of the Hero — Laurent Tirard
- 2019: Sisters in Arms — Caroline Fourest
- 2019: Territory of Love — Romain Cogitore
- 2019: Minuscule 2: Mandibles from Far Away — Hélène Giraud & Thomas Szabo
- 2020: La Pièce rapportée — Antonin Peretjatko
- 2020: Le Discours — Laurent Tirard
- 2020: La Fine Fleur — Pierre Pinaud
- 2021: Ouistreham — Emmanuel Carrère
- 2021: The Accusation — Yvan Attal
- 2021: The Last Mercenary — David Charhon
- 2022: Jack Mimoun et les Secrets de Val Verde — Malik Bentalha & Ludovic Colbeau-Justin
- 2022: Le Tigre et le Président — Jean-Marc Peyrefitte
- 2022: Les Têtes givrées — Stéphane Cazes
- 2022: La Guerre des Lulus — Yann Samuell
- 2022: Juste ciel ! — Laurent Tirard
- 2023: A Place to Fight For — Romain Cogitore
- 2023: Soul Mates — André Téchiné
- 2026: Cold Storage — Jonny Campbell
- 2026: L'Affaire Bojarski — Jean-Paul Salomé

=== Television ===
- 2008: Cherche toujours (documentary)
- 2011: Pour Djamila
- 2012: Climats
- 2013: Super Fungi (documentary)
- 2013: Bardot, la méprise (documentary)
- 2014: Rocky IV : le coup de poing américain (documentary)
- 2015: Un père coupable
- 2016: La Sociologue et l'Ourson (documentary)
- 2017: L'Homme dauphin, sur les traces de Jacques Mayol (documentary)
- 2018–2020: L'Art du crime (TV series, seasons 2, 3 and 4)
- 2021: Lupin (Netflix) — season 1
- 2021: Meurtres à Blois
- 2022: Lupin (Netflix) — season 2
- 2023: Lupin (Netflix) — season 3
- 2023: Tobie Lolness (France Télévisions)
- 2025: Cassandra (Netflix Germany)

=== Radio ===
- 2017: Madame Bovary by Gustave Flaubert, France Culture
- 2025: La Reine des neiges by Hans Christian Andersen, France Culture with the Orchestre Philharmonique de Radio France

== Awards and nominations ==
=== Awards ===
- 2005: Grand Prix for Best Sound Creation, Aubagne International Film Festival — Les oreilles n'ont pas de paupières
- 2018: Best Original Score for a Comedy, Reel Music Awards — Return of the Hero
- 2020: UCMF Award, Best Score for an Animated Film — Minuscule 2: Mandibles from Far Away
- 2023: Grand Prix SACEM, Film Music

=== Nominations ===
- 2019: World Soundtrack Awards, Public Choice — Minuscule 2: Mandibles from Far Away
- 2019: IFMCA, Breakthrough Composer of the Year
- 2019: IFMCA, Best Score for an Animated Film — 'Minuscule 2: Mandibles from Far Away
- 2019: UCMF Award, Cinema category — Return of the Hero
- 2021: Prix Michel-Legrand
- 2023: France Musique–SACEM Listeners' Prize, Best Original Film Score — A Place to Fight For
- 2025: Deutscher Fernsehpreis, Best Music — Cassandra
