= Rural noir =

Rural noir or outback noir may refer to:

- Rural noir (fiction), a genre of fiction in written form, a sub-genre of noir fiction
- Rural noir (film), a genre of film and TV series, a sub-genre of film noir
- Rural noir may also be used to describe Southern noir
