= Slavenka Drakulić =

Croatian journalist and novelist (1949–2026)

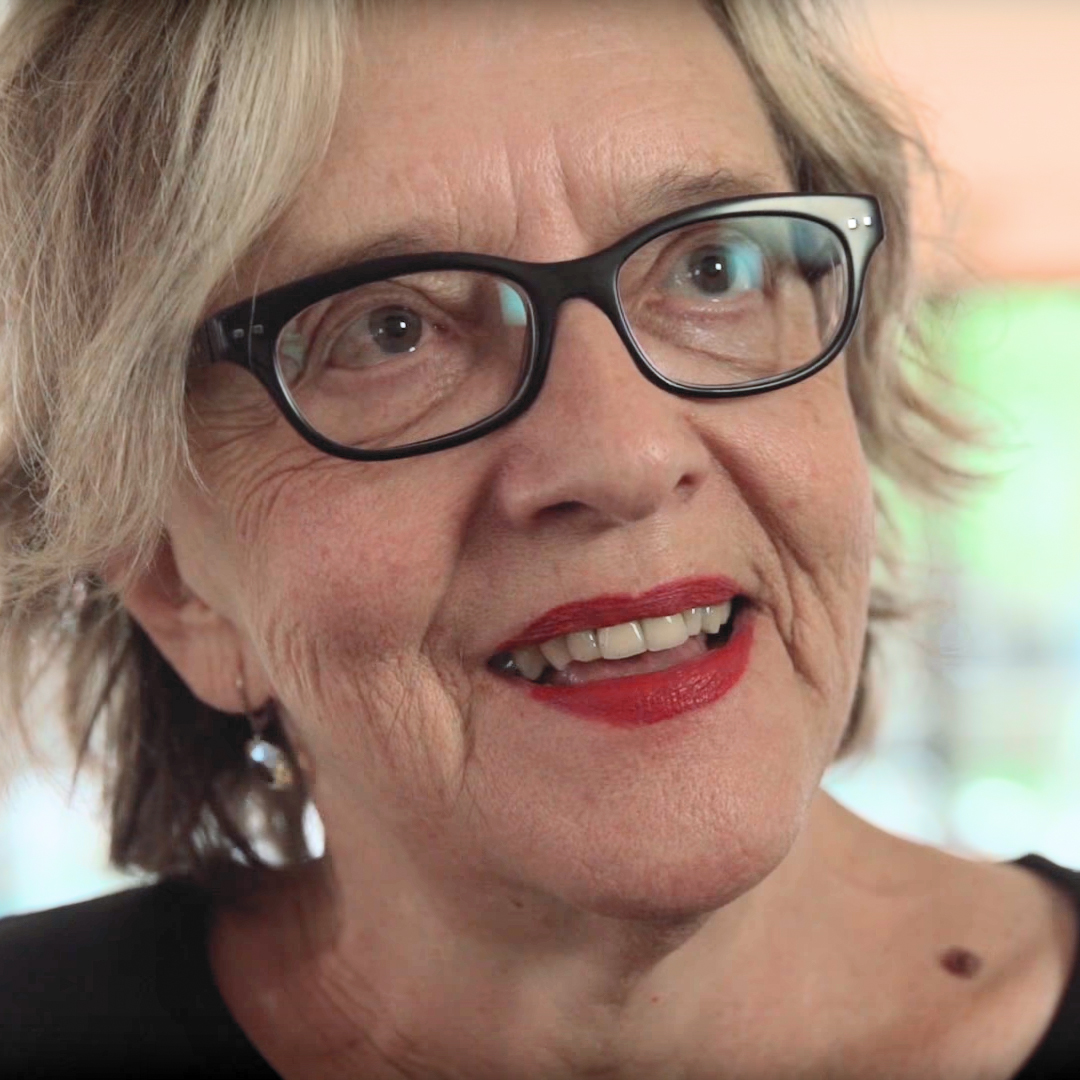
- Drakulić in 2016
- Born: 4 July 1949; Rijeka, PR Croatia, FPR Yugoslavia
- Died: 20 June 2026 (aged 76)
- Education: University of Zagreb
- Occupations: Journalist; novelist; essayist
- Writing career
- Subjects: Yugoslav Wars; feminism; post-communism
- Notable awards: Leipzig Book Award for European Understanding; 2005 They Would Never Hurt a Fly

Slavenka Drakulić (4 July 1949 – 20 June 2026) was a Croatian journalist, novelist, and essayist whose works on feminism, communism, and post-communism have been translated into many languages.

== Life and career ==
Drakulić was born in Rijeka, PR Croatia, FPR Yugoslavia, on 4 July 1949. She graduated in comparative literature and sociology from the University in Zagreb in 1976. From 1982 to 1992, she was a staff writer for the Start bi-weekly newspaper and news weekly Danas (both in Zagreb), writing mainly on feminist issues. In addition to her novels and collections of essays, Drakulić's work has appeared in The New Republic, The New York Times Magazine, The New York Review of Books, Süddeutsche Zeitung, Internazionale, The Nation, La Stampa, Dagens Nyheter, Frankfurter Allgemeine Zeitung, Eurozine, Politiken and The Guardian. She was a contributing editor for The Nation. She lived in Croatia and in Sweden.

She temporarily left Croatia for Sweden in the early 1990s for political reasons during the Yugoslav wars. A notorious unsigned 1992 Globus article (Slaven Letica subsequently admitted to being its author) accused five Croatian female writers, Drakulić included, of being "witches" and of "raping" Croatia. According to Letica, these writers failed to take a definitive stance against rape as allegedly planned military tactic by Bosnian Serb forces against Croats, and rather treated it as crimes of "unidentified males" against women. Soon after the publication, Drakulić started to receive telephone threats; her property was also vandalized. Finding little or no support from her erstwhile friends and colleagues, she decided to leave Croatia. In 1994, she received the prize "Archivio Disarmo - Golden Doves for Peace" from IRIAD.

Her noted works relate to the Yugoslav wars. As If I Am Not There is about crimes against women in the Bosnian War, while They Would Never Hurt a Fly is a book in which she also analyzed her experience overseeing the proceedings and the inmates of the International Criminal Tribunal for the Former Yugoslavia at The Hague. Both books touch on the same issues that caused her wartime emigration from the home country. In scholarly circles, she is better known for her two collections of essays: "How We Survived Communism and Even Laughed" and "Cafe Europa". These are both non-fiction accounts of Drakulić's life during and after communism.

Her 2008 novel, Frida's Bed, is based on a biography of the Mexican painter Frida Kahlo. Her 2011 book of essays, A Guided Tour Through the Museum of Communism: Fables from a Mouse, a Parrot, a Bear, a Cat, a Mole, a Pig, a Dog, & a Raven, was published by Penguin in the US, and was widely reviewed to great acclaim. The book consists of eight reflections told from the point of view of a different animal. Each beast reflects on the remembrance of communism in different countries in Eastern Europe. In the second-to-last chapter, a Romanian dog explains that under capitalism everyone is unequal "but some are more unequal than others", an inversion of a famous George Orwell quote from Animal Farm.

In 2021, Drakulić published a new essay collection, Café Europa Revisited: How to Survive Post-Communism, which reflected on the continued divisions between Eastern and Western Europe even thirty years after the fall of the Berlin Wall. The title of this book refers back to the two essay collections she published in the 1990s, How We Survived Communism and Even Laughed (1992) and Café Europa: Life After Communism (1997), and attempts to take stock of the last three decades of changes. Drakulić writes about the bitter disappointments felt by many East Europeans who expected that the revolutions of 1989 would usher in a new era of democracy and prosperity. Instead, the essays in this collection reveal that East Europeans still feel like second-class citizens. In her chapter discussing what she calls "European food apartheid," Drakulić describes how investigators found that Western corporations sold lower quality products in the East under the same brand names and packaging they use in the West: fish sticks with less fish in them and biscuits made with cheaper palm oil instead of butter. Drakulić also ruminates on the persistence of post-communist nostalgia in the region, as people try to grapple with both the positive and negative legacies of their collective pasts. She writes, “In all former communist countries in Eastern Europe, it is difficult to mention the merits of communism, a system that, in a short time, brought modernization and changed an agrarian society into an urbanized, industrial one. It meant general education as well as the emancipation of women; this has to be recognized, even though such changes were accomplished by a totalitarian regime.”

Drakulić lived in Stockholm and Zagreb. In 2020, she contracted a severe case of COVID-19 and was hospitalized for twelve days in an intensive care unit, six of which she spent on a ventilator.

Drakulić died on 20 June 2026, at the age of 76. She had only recently published her book Zašto nisam naučila kuhati (Why I Never Learned to Cook).

== Bibliography ==
=== Fiction ===
- Holograms Of Fear Hutchinson, London (1992).
- Marble Skin Hutchinson, London (1993).
- The Taste of a Man Abacus, London (1997)
- S -a novel about Balkans (also known as: "As If I Am Not There") (1999). Made into a movie "As If I Am Not There", directed by Juanita Wilson.
- S.- A Novel About The Balkans (1999) : 1 January 2001 by Penguin Books ISBN 978-0140298444
- Frida's Bed Penguin USA, New York (2008), (translated by Christina P. Zorić)

=== Non-fiction ===
- Smrtni grijesi feminizma (1984) only in Croatian
- How We Survived Communism and Even Laughed, Hutchinson, London (1991). ISBN 978-0060975401
- Balkan Express: Fragments from the Other Side of the War, W.W. Norton, New York (1993). ISBN 978-0060976088
- Cafe Europa: Life After Communism Abacus, London (1996) ISBN 978-0140277722
- They Would Never Hurt a Fly: War Criminals on Trial in the Hague Abacus -Time Warner, London (2004) ISBN 978-0143035428
- "Tijelo njenog tijela" (2006) available in Croatian, German and Polish. Available as an e-book in English "Flesh of Her Flesh".
- "Two Underdogs and a Cat", Seagull Books . London, NY, Calcutta (2009)
- A Guided Tour through the Museum of Communism. Fables from a Mouse, a Parrot, a Bear, a Cat, a Mole, a Pig, a Dog, and a Raven, Penguin, New York, (2011) ISBN 978-0143118633 Also in Croatian, Persian, Swedish, Bulgarian and Italian.
- Cafe Europa Revisited, Penguin (2021) ISBN 978-0143134176, also in Croatian, Ukrainian, and Persian.
- Zašto nisam naučila kuhati (Why I Never Learned to Cook) (2026)

=== Articles ===
- We Are All Albanians 1999
- Bosnian Women Witness 2001
- Crime in the circles of power October 2008
- Slavenka Drakulic Interview 2009
- Articles on Eurozine
- Articles in The Nation
- Articles in The Guardian
- Rape as a Weapon of War 2008
- Slavenka Drakulic and Katha Pollitt in conversation 2011
