= Tomato Red =

2017 Irish-Canadian crime film

- Directed by: Juanita Wilson
- Screenplay by: Juanita Wilson
- Based on: Tomato Red by Daniel Woodrell
- Produced by: Daniel Bekerman; James Flynn; Elizabeth Gill
- Starring: Julia Garner
- Cinematography: Piers McGrail
- Edited by: Nathan Nugent
- Music by: Thomas Haugh; Kevin Murphy; Stephen Shannon
- Release date: March 3, 2017
- Running time: 112 minutes
- Countries: Ireland; Canada
- Language: English

Tomato Red (also known as Tomato Red: Blood Money) is a 2017 Irish-Canadian crime film written and directed by Juanita Wilson and starring Jake Weary and Julia Garner. It is based on the novel of the same name by Daniel Woodrell.

== Plot ==
Sammy is released from prison and moves into a trailer and gets a low level job. On Friday he goes to a bar, starts drinking, and befriends some locals. After spending the weekend with them smoking meth, they convince him to break into a wealthy family's house. The car that takes him to the house abandons him, as he drinks liquor and passes out.

He awakens to find himself tied to a chair, by brother and sister, Jammalee and Jason. They act as though it is their house and eventually untie him. When the police show up, all three flee. Jammalee invites Sammy to her trailer but he returns to his trailer instead. He confronts the people who abandoned him, beating a man and getting his belongings. He then decides to go to Jammalee's.

Sammy ends up living with Jammalee and Jason in their brother's room who is currently incarcerated. Their mother, Bev lives in a home next to theirs and works as a prostitute. Sammy befriends all three. Sammy and the two siblings continue to break into wealthy people's homes and blackmail them with information they find. This eventually leads to Jason being murdered. A local police officer pays them off with $5,500, instructing them to leave it alone. He claims people just wanted to beat Jason in order to send him a message but things got out of hand. Soon after, Jammalee leaves town alone and Sammy confronts and fights the townspeople.

== Cast ==
- Julia Garner as Jamalee Merridew
- Jake Weary as Sammy
- Anna Friel as Bev Merridew
- Nick Roux as Jason Merridew

== Reception ==
On the review aggregator website Rotten Tomatoes, 67% of 6 critics' reviews are positive.

Paddy Kehoe of RTÉ.ie awarded the film four stars out of five, writing that it "is a strong, engaging film in which Irish director Juanita Wilson manipulates the dramatic elements to engender a keen sense of pathos and despair." Gwilyn Mumford of The Guardian gave the film two stars out of five, and wrote, "ultimately it's a case of all surface, no feeling."

Donald Clarke of The Irish Times awarded it three stars out of five, and wrote, "the picture is not in the same class as the two previous Woodrell adaptations, but it has unmistakable personality."
