= Alone (2004 film) =

Film by Thomas Durchschlag

- Theatrical release poster
- German: Allein
- Directed by: Thomas Durchschlag
- Written by: Thomas Durchschlag
- Produced by: Joachim Ortmanns
- Starring: Lavinia Wilson; Maximilian Brückner; Richy Müller; Victoria Mayer; Holger Kunkel; Daniel Drewes; Peter Fieseler; Tobias van Dieken
- Cinematography: Michael Wiesweg
- Edited by: Ingo Ehrlich
- Music by: Maciej Śledziecki
- Production companies: Lichtblick Film; WDR
- Distributed by: Zorro Film
- Release dates: 28 October 2004 (Hof); 28 July 2005 (Germany)
- Running time: 88 minutes
- Country: Germany
- Language: German

Alone (German: Allein) is a 2004 German drama film written and directed by Thomas Durchschlag. The film premiered at the 2004 Hof International Film Festival.

== Cast ==
- Lavinia Wilson as Maria
- Maximilian Brückner as Jan
- Richy Müller as Wolfgang
- Victoria Mayer as Sarah
- Tobias van Dieken as Nico
- Holger Kunkel as Rasmus
- Peter Fieseler as Yuppie
- Daniel Drewes as a taxi driver
