= Torsten Voges =

German actor

- Born: Germany
- Occupation: Actor
- Height: 6 ft 8.8 in (205 cm)
- Spouse: Ariana Weil

Torsten Voges is a German actor who appeared in The Big Lebowski, Funny People and two Rob Zombie films: The Lords of Salem as Count Gorgann and Death-Head in 31.

== Filmography ==
| Year | Title | Role | Notes |
|---|---|---|---|
| 1978 | Moritz, lieber Moritz | | |
| 1994 | Dangerous Games | Singer | TV movie |
| 1997 | Seinfeld | Cab driver | Episode: "The Butter Shave" |
| 1998 | Gia | German Photographer | TV movie |
| 1998 | The Big Lebowski | Nihilist #3, Franz | |
| 1999 | P.U.N.K.S. | Bruno | |
| 1999 | 8mm | Stick | |
| 1999 | Die Bademeister | | TV movie |
| 1999 | Deuce Bigalow: Male Gigolo | Tina | |
| 2001 | Malcolm in the Middle | Helmut | Episode: "Surgery" |
| 2003 | Andi Ommsen ist der letzte Lude | Vorhaut Franky / Chantal | |
| 2008 | Dimples | The Demon | |
| 2009 | Funny People | Dr. Lars | |
| 2009 | Eastwick | Fidel | 9 episodes |
| 2011 | Easy to Assemble | Stig Martinson | 4 episodes |
| 2012 | Jessie | Fritz | Episode: "Take the A-Train... I Think!" |
| 2012 | The Lords of Salem | Count Gorgann | |
| 2013 | The Piano Room | Victor | |
| 2014 | Bullet | Kruger | |
| 2016 | 31 | Death-Head | |
| 2016 | The Do-Over | The Gymnast | |
| 2016 | Grimm | The Leader | Episode: "Where the Wild Things Were" |
| 2016 | Titanium White | Professor | |
| 2017 | Scrambled | Karl Aidell | Final film role |
