= Franz Hartwig =

German actor

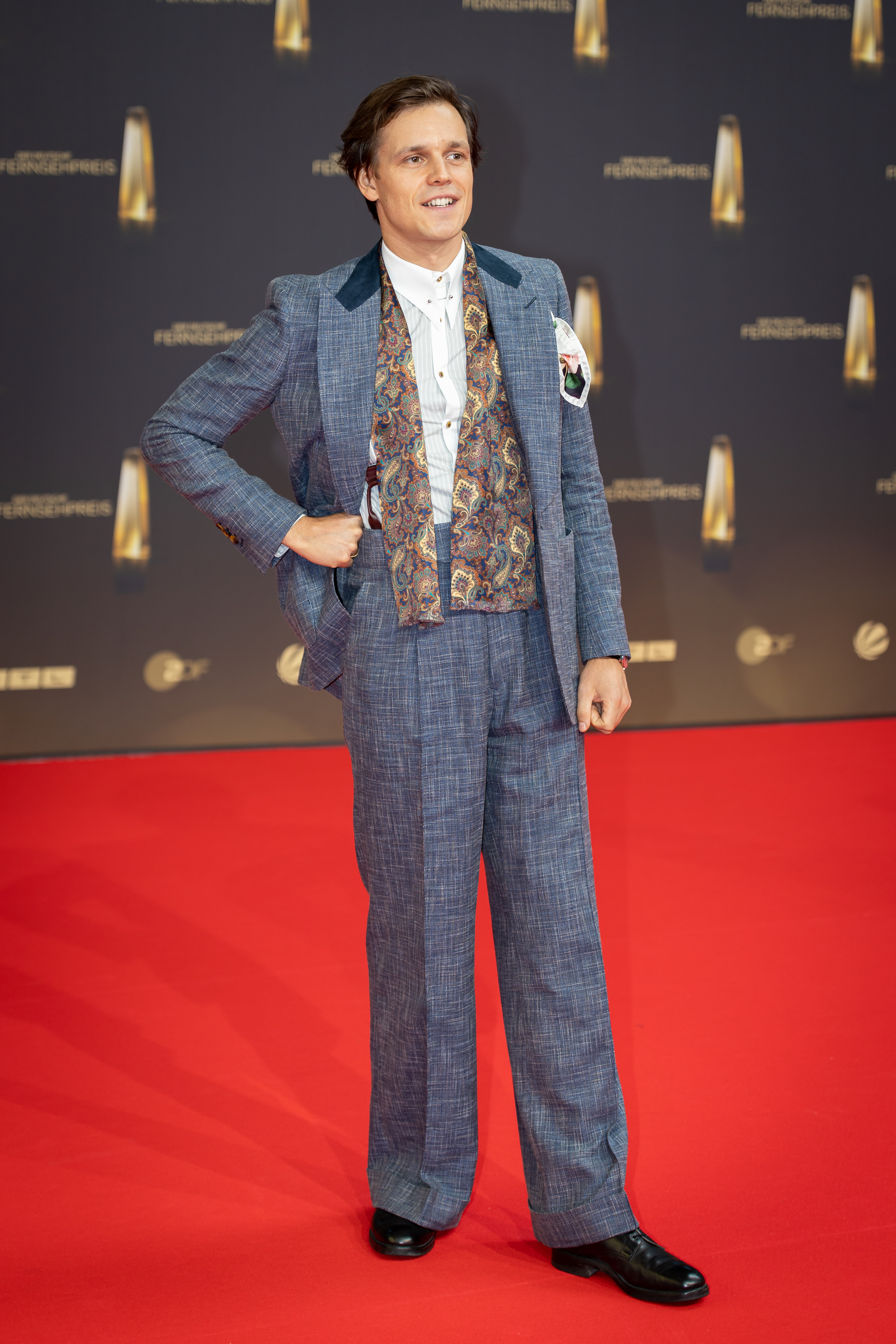

Franz Hartwig (born 1986) is a German actor.

== Life ==
He was born in Dresden. He lives in Berlin.

== Selected filmography ==
- 2019: Der Pass (TV series) as Gregor Ansbach
- 2021: Enemies (TV film) as Georg Kelz
- 2025: Cassandra (TV series) (TV series) as Horst Schmitt
