= Daniel Woodrell =

American novelist (1953–2025)

- Born: March 4, 1953; Springfield, Missouri, U.S.
- Died: November 28, 2025 (aged 72); West Plains, Missouri, U.S.
- Education: University of Kansas (BA); Iowa Writers' Workshop (MFA)
- Occupation: Novelist
- Writing career
- Period: 1986–2025
- Genres: Crime fiction; "country noir"

Daniel Stanford Woodrell (March 4, 1953 – November 28, 2025) was an American novelist and short story writer who wrote nine novels, most of them set in the Missouri Ozarks, and one collection of short stories. Woodrell coined the phrase "country noir" to describe his 1996 novel Give Us a Kiss. Reviewers have frequently since used the term to categorize his writing.

== Early life and education ==
Woodrell was born in Springfield, Missouri, in the southwestern corner of the state. He grew up in Missouri and dropped out of high school to join the Marines. Later he earned a BA from the University of Kansas and an MFA from the Iowa Writers' Workshop. The University of Missouri–Kansas City awarded an honorary doctorate to Daniel Woodrell on December 17, 2016.

== Career ==
Woodrell has set most of his novels in the Missouri Ozarks, a landscape he knew from childhood. He has created novels based on crime, a style he termed "country noir", a phrase adopted by commentators on his work. However, William Michael Boyle, an avowed fan and fellow author of literary crime fiction, put Woodrell's work in broader context: "this Woodrell guy's got double of everything. Language, plot, dialogue, sense of place, energy, tension...He's interested in the whole of humanity through the lens of his place."

Woodrell has had three novels adapted for films. His second novel, Woe to Live On (1987), was adapted for the 1999 film Ride with the Devil, directed by Ang Lee. Winter's Bone (2006) was adapted by writer and director Debra Granik for a film of the same title, and released commercially in June 2010 after winning two awards at the Sundance Film Festival, including the Grand Jury Prize for a dramatic film. Several critics called it one of the best films of the year and an American classic, and it received four Academy Award nominations, including Best Picture.

Tomato Red (1998) was adapted for a 2017 feature film by Irish writer and director Juanita Wilson. This was released in Ireland in March 2017 and went on to be nominated for four awards at that year's Irish Film & Television Awards, including Best Film. Its US debut took place on April 23, 2017, at the Newport Beach Film Festival.

While filming a segment for Anthony Bourdain: No Reservations, Woodrell was filmed breaking his shoulder in a fishing boat accident.

== Personal life and death ==
Woodrell lived in West Plains, Missouri, and was married to the novelist Katie Estill.

Woodrell died of pancreatic cancer in West Plains, on November 28, 2025, at the age of 72.

== Honors ==
Year	Title	Award	Category	Result	Ref.
1992	The Ones You Do	Hammett Prize	—	Special Mention	
1998	Tomato Red	Hammett Prize	—	Shortlisted	
1999	Tomato Red	PEN Center USA Literary Award	Fiction	Won	
2000	Tomato Red	International Dublin Literary Award	—	Longlisted	
2006	Winter's Bone	Los Angeles Times Book Prize	Fiction	Finalist	
2011	Winter's Bone	Audie Award	Fiction	Won	
2013	The Death of Sweet Mister	RUSA CODES Listen List	—	Selection	
2013	The Maid's Version	Los Angeles Times Book Prize	Fiction	Finalist	
2014	The Maid's Version	Chicago Tribune Heartland Prize	Fiction	Won	
2014	The Maid's Version	Maine Readers' Choice Award	—	Longlisted	
2015	The Maid's Version	International Dublin Literary Award	—	Longlisted	

== Bibliography ==
=== Books ===
- Under the Bright Lights (Henry Holt, 1986)
- Woe to Live On (Henry Holt, 1987)
- Muscle for the Wing (Henry Holt, 1988)
- The Ones You Do (Henry Holt, 1992)
- Give Us a Kiss: A Country Noir (Henry Holt, 1996)
- Tomato Red (Henry Holt, 1998)
- The Death of Sweet Mister (Putnam, 2001)
- Winter's Bone (Little, Brown, 2006)
- The Outlaw Album (Little, Brown, 2011)
- The Maid's Version (Little, Brown, 2013)

=== Omnibus ===
- The Bayou Trilogy (Mulholland Books, 2011) (collects Under the Bright Lights, Muscle for the Wing, and The Ones You Do)

== Film adaptations ==
- Ride with the Devil (adapted from novel Woe to Live On) (1999)
- Winter's Bone (adapted from novel) (2010)
- Tomato Red (adapted from novel) (2017)
