= List of Irish submissions for the Academy Award for Best International Feature Film =

Best International Feature Film submissions from Ireland

Highlights
- Debut: 2007
- Submissions: 13
- Nominations: 1
- Oscar winners: none

Ireland is one of one hundred countries that have submitted films for the Academy Award for Best International Feature Film. (Note: The category was previously named the Academy Award for Best Foreign Language Film, but this was changed to the Academy Award for Best International Feature Film in April 2019, after the Academy deemed the word "Foreign" to be outdated.) The award is handed out annually by the Academy of Motion Picture Arts and Sciences to a feature-length motion picture produced outside the United States that contains primarily non-English dialogue. Although Ireland has a thriving domestic film industry, most feature films are produced in English and are thus ineligible for the award. The Irish Film & Television Academy (IFTA) submits Ireland's entry.

As of 2026, Ireland was nominated once, for The Quiet Girl (2022).

== Submissions ==
The Academy of Motion Picture Arts and Sciences has invited the film industries of various countries to submit their best film for the Academy Award for Best International Feature Film since 1956. The International Feature Film Committee oversees the process and reviews all the submitted films. Following this, they vote via secret ballot to determine the five nominees for the award.

Even though Irish is the country's first official language, the country film industry is mainly in English, thus many of its productions are unable to qualify for the category. Since 2011, Ireland has been submitting co-produced films in a varied range of languages, such as Serbo-Croatian (As If I Am Not There), Spanish (Viva), Arabic (Gaza and In the Shadow of Beirut), and Ukrainian (Sanatorium).

Spanish-language Viva (2015) directed by Irish filmmaker Paddy Breathnach, was the first Irish submission to advance for the December shortlisted finalists films, but was not nominated.

The Quiet Girl (2022) directed by Colm Bairéad, became the first Irish film to be nominated in the category at the 95th Academy Awards, and was also the first Irish-language production to receive an Academy Awards nomination.

Below is a list of the films that have been submitted by Ireland for review by the academy for the award by year and the respective Academy Awards ceremony.

Year (Ceremony)	Film title used in nomination	Original title	Languages	Director	Result
2007 (80th)	Kings		Irish, English	Tommy Collins	Not nominated
2011 (84th)	As If I Am Not There	Као да ме нема	Serbo-Croatian	Juanita Wilson	Not nominated
2014 (87th)	The Gift	An Bronntanas	Irish	Tommy Collins	Not nominated
2015 (88th)	Viva		Spanish	Paddy Breathnach	Made shortlist
2017 (90th)	Song of Granite		Irish, English	Pat Collins	Not nominated
2019 (92nd)	Gaza	غزة	Arabic	Garry Keane and Andrew McConnell	Not nominated
2020 (93rd)	Arracht		Irish, English	Tom Sullivan	Not nominated
2021 (94th)	Foscadh	Foscaḋ	Irish	Seán Breathnach	Not nominated
2022 (95th)	The Quiet Girl	An Cailín Ciúin	Irish, English	Colm Bairéad	Nominated
2023 (96th)	In the Shadow of Beirut		Arabic	Stephen Gerard Kelly and Garry Keane	Not nominated
2024 (97th)	Kneecap		Irish, English	Rich Peppiatt	Made shortlist
2025 (98th)	Sanatorium		Ukrainian	Gar O'Rourke	Not nominated
2026 (99th)	Aontas		Irish	Damian McCann	Pending

== See also ==
- List of Academy Award winners and nominees for Best International Feature Film
- List of Academy Award-winning foreign language films
- List of Academy Award winners and nominees from Ireland
- Cinema of Ireland
- List of British submissions for the Academy Award for Best International Feature Film
