= Café Europa =

1996 book by Slavenka Drakulić

First edition (publ. Abacus Books)

Café Europa: Life After Communism is a 1996 book by Croatian writer Slavenka Drakulić. It talks about the experiences of the peoples of Eastern Europe after the retreat of socialism and the fall of the Iron Curtain. While Drakulić notes the liberation of the formerly oppressed, her hard hitting social commentary points out the repercussions and lack of progress since the end of Soviet domination.

== Themes ==
=== Yugoslavia ===
Writing about her life in native socialist Yugoslavia, Drakulić compares her life with those of people living within the Warsaw Pact countries. She notes that she always felt superior to them, as Josip Broz Tito's regime permitted both a higher standard of living and greater freedom of movement. Despite these amenities, to Drakulić Yugoslavia was still just a bigger cage.

=== Poverty and deprivation ===
While visiting Eastern European countries like Romania and Bulgaria Drakulić sees the degradation of national infrastructure, such as sewage systems. This decline, she concludes, is due in part to a post-communist mentality.

=== Aspirations to a European identity ===
According to Drakulić, the newly liberated states of Eastern Europe aspire to rejoin Western European society, which they were cut off from for more than 50 years after the Soviet occupation. However, the NATO and European Union countries do not feel the same way, and "Europe" can be seen as merely a construction in the mind of Eastern Europe. However, Drakulić warns, "We are all Albanians", and cannot disregard a common heritage.

=== Authoritarianism in post-independence Croatia ===
Despite the removal of communist governments throughout Europe, Drakulić is dismayed to find that in her homeland of Croatia the vacuum has not been filled by a completely democratic government. President Tudjman rules with an authoritarian grip, and much of the bureaucracy is full of former apparatchiks. Despite the more recent communist past, in Drakulić's view Croatia's leaders call upon the memory of the fascist Croatian state of World War II.

== Sequel ==
In January 2021, Penguin Books published a sequel, Café Europa Revisited, a collection of 15 essays touching on similar themes from the original book such as nationalization, Balkanization, food apartheid, and antisemitism.
