= Der Pass =

Austrian-German police drama TV series

- Season 1 title card
- Also known as: Pagan Peak
- German: Der Pass
- Genre: Thriller; crime fiction; drama
- Created by: Cyrill Boss; Philipp Stennert
- Inspired by: Broen | Bron by Hans Rosenfeldt
- Screenplay by: Cyrill Boss; Philipp Stennert; Mike Majzen
- Directed by: Cyrill Boss; Philipp Stennert
- Starring: Julia Jentsch; Nicholas Ofczarek; Franz Hartwig
- Theme music composer: Jacob Shea
- Composer: Hans Zimmer
- Countries of origin: Austria; Germany
- Original language: German
- No. of seasons: 3
- No. of episodes: 24 (list of episodes)

Production
- Producers: Quirin Berg; Max Wiedemann; Dieter Pochlatko; Jakob Pochlatko
- Editors: Andreas Baltschun; Lucas Seeberger
- Running time: 45 mins. (per episode)
- Production companies: Wiedemann & Berg Film Production; Epo-Film

Original release
- Network: Sky Deutschland
- Release: 25 January 2019 – 27 May 2023

Der Pass (English: The Pass) or Pagan Peak is an Austrian-German television crime drama series which premiered on Sky Deutschland on 25 January 2019. It was inspired by season 1 of the Danish-Swedish series, Broen | Bron (English:The Bridge). Der Pass was co-created by Cyrill Boss and Philipp Stennert, both of whom also direct and write episodes. Criminal profiler Alexander Horn advised on police procedure. The action is set largely in the Austro-German border region from Traunstein to Salzburg. In the first season of eight episodes, two detectives, German Ellie (Julia Jentsch) and Gedeon (Nicholas Ofczarek) from Austria, hunt a serial killer, Gregor (Franz Hartwig), who uses a Krampus mask as a disguise. The pilot episode, "Finsternis" (English: "Darkness"), had its world premiere on 21 September 2018 at the Tribeca TV Festival, ahead of the full series premiere. Its Austrian debut was at the Urania Cinema, Vienna, on 15 January 2019, and its German premiere at Gloria-Palast, Munich, on the following day.

Season 2 of Der Pass, also of eight episodes, began airing on 21 January 2022. In this season, Ellie and Gedeon investigate a series of murders after female bodies are found in the border area. Their killer, Xandi (Dominic Marcus Singer), is protected by his family's business empire. A third and final season aired beginning 4 May 2023.

== Premise ==
Season one Gedeon and Ellie respond to a body at the border. It is the first victim of a serial killer, Gregor, who wears a Krampus mask. Gregor warns: "The Red Season Is Coming." Gedeon alerts authorities of Gregor's imminent bombing of a shopping mall; a child is killed. Tech-savvy Gregor hacks into Ellie's computer to stay ahead of the investigation. A copycat suspect is killed by police and authorities declare the case closed. A year later, Gedeon is unconvinced and persuades Ellie to search for another victim. Gregor has moved next door to Ellie. He poisons both her and himself before being arrested. Gedeon saves Ellie's life. At a traffic stop, Gedeon is shot as gangland revenge.

Season two A year later, Ellie mentors junior detective Yela, and is joined by Gedeon as a police advisor. They investigate another serial killer, Xandi, who tortures, rapes, and revives his female victims before killing them. Xandi uses folklore rituals typical of how hunters killed and displayed wild animals. Both Ellie and Gedeon are recovering from traumas. Xandi is protected by his older brother Wolfgang, his mother Therese, the family's employee Manni and investigating chief detective Manuel. Wolfgang kills Yela with a family rifle. Following an anonymous tip from Wolfgang, Xandi is arrested and imprisoned for multiple murders, and confesses for the killing of Yela too. Gedeon smuggles the rifle out of the evidence archive at Therese's behest, in exchange for Theresa paying a surgeon to remove the bullet from Gedeon's brain. Wolfgang leaves for South Africa, and Gedeon is reinstated with honors as a police officer.

Season three Six months later, serial killer Felix follows instructions from his leader, Stefan, who poses as a legendary figure, Jackl the Knacker. Ellie and Gedeon now have a fractious relationship. Ellie blames Gedeon for Wolfgang escaping justice. In the meantime, Gedeon, who is still suffering from the operation and has hallucinations, also investigates the whereabouts of Oskar, an artist who gained notoriety for his painting of children and who abused Gedeon as a child. Felix successively kills Samir, Marianne, Tobias and Peter while praying to Jackl, "sequere me, te protegam" (English: "Follow me, I'll protect you") . Stefan is questioned but released due to insufficient evidence. Gedeon finally tracks down and kills Oskar using Wolfgang's rifle. Ellie confronts Felix but he commits suicide. Internal Affairs investigates Gedeon and Ellie. Gedeon finds a link between Felix's victims and Stefan, who has disappeared.

== Cast ==
- Julia Jentsch as Ellie Stocker: Traunstein senior detective inspector, enthusiastic and thorough, has an affair with Claas, her boss.
- Nicholas Ofczarek as Gedeon Winter or "Falcon": Salzburg detective inspector, cynical, dissolute and corrupt, yet becomes fixated on catching the "Krampus killer" by working in the joint task alongside Ellie Stocker.
- Lucas Gregorowicz as Charles Turek: Munich sensationalist newspaper reporter, writes a book about the Krampus killer. Later works for Abendpost (English: Evening Post).
- Rony Herman as Sven Rieger: police task force's IT investigator.
- Matthias Hack as Ben Heller: Salzburg police detective, Manuel's subordinate; becomes second-in-charge for Gedeon.
- Martin Feifel as Christian Ressler: Austrian criminal profiler and case analyst.
- Alexander Stecher as Oskar Maria Koschlik (alias: Mr Simic): notable, modern visual artist, alleged pedophile, investigated by Gedeon several years ago; sexually abused Gedeon while living with Gedeon's mother.
- Sibylle Canonica as Therese Gössen: manages Gössen family interests, mother of Wolfgang and Alexander, protective.
- Michael Fuith as Staatsanwalt Svoboda: Vienna public prosecutor, investigating Gedeon and Califati; later refuses Ellie's request to investigate Gedeon on suspicion of corruption.
- Christian Baumann (actor) as Thomas Braun: Ellie's deputy; later joins task force.

=== Season one cast ===
- Franz Hartwig as Gregor Ansbach/"David Zeller": self-sufficient survivalist, tech-savvy, uses Krampus legends for his own ends, poses as David to become Ellie's neighbour.
- Hanno Koffler as Claas Wallinger: Traunstein police commissioner, Ellie's superior, has an affair with Ellie.
- Lukas Miko as Sebastian Brunner: doomsdayer/survivalist, Six Brothers cult leader, styles himself as "Cernunnos".
- Nataša Petrović as Milica Andov: undocumented Macedonian refugee, mountain inn employee exploited by her boss, Sara.
- Julian Looman as Adam Litkowski: Salzburg detective on Gedeon's squad, promoted to inspector.
- Theresa Martini as Louisa Baumgartner: woman missing for three months, found imprisoned and beaten at Six Brothers cult, remains loyal to Sebastian.
- Victoria Trauttmansdorff as Johanna Stadlober: Salzburg police commander, Gedeon's boss.
- Christopher Schärf as Jörg Hässmann: political candidate for governor.
- Sarah Rebellato as Dalia Blani: police task force investigator, organises Dat.Sec's interviews.
- Antonia Moretti as Joy: popular blogger on fashion and make-up, dates Rafael.
- Gregor Kohlhofer as Rafael Conrad: heir to the Conrad family financial empire, dates Joy.
- Christian Aumer as Widmann: Police Commissioner, replaces Claas, becomes Ellie's new boss.
- Maria Bachmann as Martina Bartl: Munich newspaper editor, Charles' boss.
- Hans Brückner as Joseph Klein: Bavarian Interior Minister, restructures task force.
- Katrin Filzen as Sara Körner: innkeeper, exploits Milica
- Matthias Ransberger as Fred: mountain inn employee
- Kerim Waller as Karim: Califati's henchman
- David Zimmerschied as Felix Riffeser/"Manus": Sebastian's right-hand man at Six Brothers cult
- Harald Schrott as Johannes Tischler: cyber-security company Dat.Sec's owner, employs Gregor
- Reinhold G. Moritz as Hahn: ex-inspector, worked on Tischler's murder case
- Ernst Stötzner as Wolfgang Stocker: retired Traunstein city official, part-time hunter, Ellie's father
- Norbert E. Lex as Dominik Gross: head of Ortus Foundation, unscrupulous businessman, has an affair with his employee, Nuria
- Anna Sophie Krenn as Nuria Garido: Munich-based Spanish interpreter at Ortus Foundation, mistress of Dominik
- Clemens Aap Lindenberg as Chingiz Tajmanov or "Califati": Viennese crime lord, bribed Gedeon for information
- Ferdinand Dörfler as Vincenz Lang: Krampus mask maker, witness
- Jelena Jovanova as Ivana Andov: Milica's sister, who confirms Milica's identity
- Katharina Friedl as Miriam Tander: bomb victim's mother

=== Season two cast ===
Credits:

- Franziska von Harsdorf as Yela Antic: Traunstein police investigator, mentored by Ellie.
- Dominic Marcus Singer as Alexander "Xandi" Gössen: wannabe piano virtuoso, younger brother of Wolfgang, who hunts, tortures and kills women.
- Christoph Luser as Wolfgang Gössen: economic manager of Gössen family company, protective older brother of Xandi.
- Erol Nowak as Manni Krois: hunter, taxidermist, works for the Gössens, instructs Xandi in folklore and preparing deer corpses.
- Andreas Lust as Manuel Riffeser: Salzburg detective chief inspector, in charge of Tonia's and subsequent murder investigations, corrupted by Wolfgang's minions.
- Gisela Aderhold as Alina Reichelt: anonymous help-line psychologist, contacted by Xandi.
- Ben Felipe as Tom Neuner: Traunstein police officer, works with Yela.
- Sophia Schiller as Laura Berger: Wolfgang's former girlfriend, in a coma for five years.
- Roland Silbernagl as Konstantin Vogas: heavily disfigured, wildlife photographer.
- Gabriela Garcia Vargas as Rebecca Afarid: Gössens' employee, becomes Wolfgang's current girlfriend.
- Marie Sophie von Reibnitz as Tonia Roth: 18-year-old German cyclist and camper, visiting Austria, one of Xandi's first murder victims.
- ? as Miriam Zänger: cross-country skier, one of Xandi's early murder victims.
- Christina Cervenka as Clara Sidorow: prostitute, paid by Xandi to scream, later becomes another of his murder victims.
- Claudia Kottal as Natalia Stanner: horticulturist, who is kidnapped, raped and tortured by Xandi.
- Agnieszka Salamon as Jenny: Gössens' estate housekeeper.
- Gisela Salcher as Daniela Berger: Laura's mother.
- Hans-Maria Darnov as Alfons Holzmann: farmer, Xandi's neighbor, one of Xandi's last murder victims.
- Rina Juniku as Rosalie Jonas: woman, paid off by Wolfgang to attend orgies, later a witness against the Gössens.
- Lisa-Maria Sommerfeld as Lisa Hildebrandt: nurse's daughter, suspect in Ms Fischerauer's murder.

=== Season three cast ===
Credits:

- Johannes Zirner as Rafael Lutz: Salzburg police detective, Ellie's love interest; becomes internal affairs investigator.
- Claudia Kainberger as Pia Goiginger: police task force member, works for Ben.
- Frederic Linkemann as Andreas Haas: former armed response policeman, self-declared Reichsbürger ("Free Germany"); stole gun used in shooting.
- Victoria Mayer as Nadine Hofer: Traunstein Chief Inspector, transferred from Munich, becomes Internal Affairs investigator.
- Felix Kammerer as Felix Riedle; son of Milan Kusev, tutored by Stefan, serial killer.
- August Diehl as Stefan Polt: self-styled Jackl the Knacker, promises to protect his adherents.
- Peter Miklusz as Kai Markstein: sometime Satanist, tutored by Stefan.
- Lukas Walcher as Ermittler intern (English: "Internal Investigator"): Austrian Internal Affairs, determining whether Gedeon is corrupt.
- Katia Fellin as Ina Mayer: lawyer, joins environmentalist protesters against Gössens' chalets, had affair with Tobias.
- Gabriel Raab as Volker Zacher: Freilassing citizen, Marianne's fiancé, injured while escaping Felix.
- Kolja Heiß as Gerichtsdiener (English: "Usher")
- Dolores Winkler as Marianne Eberharter: Austrian woman, Volker's fiancée

== Episode guide ==
=== Season one ===
No. overall	No. in season	Title	Directed by	Written by	Original release date
1	1	"Darkness" (Finsternis)	Cyrill Boss, Philipp Stennert	Cyrill Boss, Philipp Stennert	25 January 2019
Previous year: Austrian police arrive at an abandoned truck containing more than 20 decomposing corpses. Current: Gedeon is driven into the mountains. Ellie takes pictures of a male corpse draped over a border marker; he was killed weeks earlier. Gedeon quickly hands the case over to Ellie. He has been transferred from Vienna to Salzburg following corruption allegations. Karim asks Gedeon to continue as Califati's mole. Gedeon takes drugs via sugar cubes. Ellie's team identifies the victim as Bulgarian people smuggler Stojan Slowejko. His imprisoned cousin, Petko, was the truck's driver. Martina assigns Charles to report on Stojan's murder. An audio recording plays as a raven sits in a cage. Meanwhile, Milica works in the inn kitchen while Fred unpacks produce. After Fred smiles at Milica, Sara reprimands her for flirting. Ellie and Gedeon interview Petko; Stojan had told him about a deal with a "man from the woods." German police find Stojan's van. Charles receives an anonymous thumb drive containing Stojan's audio message, including the phrase "the red season is coming." Nuria has sex with Dominik at his chalet. Sebastian sits with his acolytes and children. A snowplough driver sees a naked Nuria by the roadside; she screams.
2	2	"The Red Season" (Die rote Jahreszeit)	Cyrill Boss, Philipp Stennert	Cyrill Boss, Philipp Stennert, Mike Majzen	25 January 2019
Sebastian tells imprisoned Louisa about his post-apocalyptic dreams. Gedeon wakes to his phone ringing incessantly: Califati's son, Umid, wants him to clean-up his murder of a prostitute, and in doing so Gedeon secures the weapon. Gedeon is called to the chalet crime scene, while Nuria is undergoing surgery. Police find Dominik's corpse posed to mirror Stojan's. Fred joins Milica for a smoke, while Sara scowls at her. Charles links the two murders and publishes a photo of Ellie and Gedeon. A doctor tells police that Nuria would have appeared dead before recovering. The killer disabled Dominik's security system. Ellie theorises the killer is performing for an audience. A witness describes Sebastian as the harbinger of the "red season". Manus falsely claims that Sebastian had already left. Gedeon notices Krampus imagery in the buildings and takes photos of Sebastian's hunting party. Charles receives another anonymous thumb drive and seeks a deal with police, but Ellie refuses. The thumb drive contains Dominik's audio message. Politicians agree to form a joint task force led by Ellie. Christian profiles the killer as a narcissistic sadist with considerable intelligence. Gedeon tells Califati his payment for saving Umid is that he is out: no more missions and no more information. Nuria provides a sketch of her attacker, who is wearing a Krampus mask.
3	3	"The Man from the Forest" (Der Mann aus dem Wald)	Cyrill Boss, Philipp Stennert	Cyrill Boss, Philipp Stennert	1 February 2019
Ellie outlines Krampus myths and Sebastian's pseudonym, Cernunnos, links him to the Krampus. Gedeon and Ellie focus on a recent missing person, Louisa. Her mother identifies Sebastian as a visitor. Police raid the Six Brothers farm, where Louisa is supposedly being held; she lashes out at her rescuers. Gedeon charges Sebastian after two of his underage acolytes are found to be pregnant, but he insists Sebastian is not the killer, a view shared by Christian. Sebastian exploits his followers but has no need to kill. Claas and Ellie sleep together. Milica keeps stones as mementos for her family. Ellie proposes using Sebastian's blogs to entrap the killer, but Claas vetoes the plan. Charles publishes Nuria's Krampus image, revealing a leak within the task force. Gregor drives to a shopping mall and gives his son, Severin, a picture book. He cyberstalks Joy, accesses her phone, and discovers she is dating Rafael. Gregor prepares a new Krampus mask and poses as a forestry ranger to meet Joy and Rafael. He injects Joy with clear liquid and later forces her through a forest. Police find Rafael's corpse, and an image of Joy's body hanging from a tree is posted on her own blog. Gedeon sells information to Charles. Claas agrees to use Sebastian as bait to trap Gregor. Gregor meets Milica.
4	4	"The Evil and the Naughty" (Die Bösen und Unartigen)	Cyrill Boss, Philipp Stennert	Cyrill Boss, Philipp Stennert, Mike Majzen	1 February 2019
Current: Sebastian films Louisa walking through woods, then shoots her. Two days earlier: Sebastian posts an encoded blog message for Gregor. Charles receives a third thumb drive but does not inform the police; instead, he publishes Joy's audio recording online. Local politician Jörg celebrates his assistant Mara's birthday, and Charles interviews him. Sven believes Gregor has taken the bait. Gregor directs Sebastian to a dark web chat site, where Sebastian types police responses to Gregor. Jörg describes Gregor as a madman and a monster. Gedeon admits to Ellie that he leaked information to Charles, and they argue. Gregor agrees to meet Sebastian if Sebastian kills someone. Gedeon realizes that Gregor has been using Jörg's phrases. Gedeon and Ellie conclude that Jörg is the next target and rush to his home. Jörg arrives home, the lights go out, and Gregor is waiting inside, but he is thwarted when police arrive. Ellie finds an open door but no one inside. Gregor rages in his car, but then sees Mara walking past, and beats her to death. Gedeon passes further information to Charles. The police and Sebastian stage Louisa's shooting. Current: Sven sends the staged footage to Gregor, who agrees to meet Sebastian at sunrise. However, Gregor visits Ellie's home, copies her phone and hard drives, and photographs her diary and notebooks.
5	5	"Masks" (Masken)	Cyrill Boss, Philipp Stennert	Cyrill Boss, Philipp Stennert	8 February 2019
Seven years earlier: After identifying vulnerabilities in Dat.Sec's system, Johannes hires Gregor and later promotes him to his secret deputy. Disturbed by the letters that Gregor started sending him, Johannes rebuffs him and revokes his deputy status. Gregor reacts violently, killing Johannes and stealing Dat.Sec's codes. Current: Sebastian abandons Louisa as he leaves the farm. Gedeon refuses to provide the Staatsanwalt with information about Califati. The task force reviews unsolved rage murders, and Adam uncovers Johannes' murder case. Gregor detonates a car in the forest. Sara unfairly docks Milica's pay. Fred attempts to rape Milica, but she escapes. Hahn describes Johannes' death and the associated data theft. Gregor listens in as Ellie reads his letters to Johannes aloud. Dalia schedules Dat.Sec employees for interviews. Gregor hides Milica from Fred and stores bomb-making chemicals in a storeroom. He poises as an artist, and explains to Milica that his opus concerns the collapse of human civilisation. Gregor secretly records Ellie and Claas having sex. Thomas interviews Gregor, who claims he had no social contact with Johannes and fills out a form with his left hand. Gregor is placed in a line-up, but is not recognised by Vincenz, a Krampus mask maker. Gregor walks past Ellie and sniffs her hair. Wolfgang, Ellie's father, collapses and falls from a deer stand. Gregor drives off in a bomb-laden van.
6	6	"Of Flesh and Blood" (Aus Fleisch und Blut)	Cyrill Boss, Philipp Stennert	Cyrill Boss, Philipp Stennert, Mike Majzen	8 February 2019
Gregor changes his van's number plates but is delayed by a ranger. Ellie visits Wolfgang in hospital, while Gedeon is subpoenaed for obstruction. Gregor parks at a shopping mall and sets his bombs. The task force notes suspicious activity, including the ranger's report about Gregor's van. Gedeon asks Sven to check the mall; Sven identifies a fake Christmas sale. Gedeon orders the mall evacuated and contacts Ellie, who is closer to the scene. Ellie arrives and sees a dead child. When Gedeon arrives, he notices Gregor watching from a distance: he is wearing a mask and evades Gedeon. Gregor returns home and checks news websites, venting his frustration that more people did not die, which shocks Milica. At a press conference, Ellie disputes Charles' portrayal of Gregor as a political terrorist, describing him instead as a vainglorious coward who targets children. Karim warns Gedeon that Califati knows about the subpoena. Claas and Ellie have sex. Gregor sends audio and video recordings to Charles. Gedeon tells Ellie to ignore reports about her affair, while Claas focuses on saving his job. While Gregor chops wood outside, Milica enters his cellar, discovers he is the Krampus killer, and flees. Milica calls the emergency services, but Gregor arrives.
7	7	"The Storm" (Der Sturm)	Cyrill Boss, Philipp Stennert	Cyrill Boss, Philipp Stennert	15 February 2019
Gregor strangles Milica and burns her belongings. Ellie is vilified for her affair rather than for failing to prevent the bombing. Klein announces that Ellie is demoted and that Claas is replaced by Widmann. Gedeon rails against Klein's populist restructuring of the task force. Sven sells the staged video of Louisa to Charles. Gregor buries Milica's body. Charles contacts Louisa. While walking away from his bogged-down car, Gregor falls and breaks his leg. Charles is contacted by a Krampus copycat. Gedeon questions why no one is following up on Milica's emergency call, but Widman insists they are pursuing other leads. At a farmhouse, Charles discovers a farmer and a police officer dead; a blast injures several police officers. Charles photographs the perpetrator, who is then killed. Klein publicly announces that the Krampus killer has been caught. Gedeon is suspended after telling the press that the police killed a copycat. Charles exploits Louisa's treatment to blackmail the authorities into granting him access to police files. Ellie breaks up with Claas. One year later: Ellie works on sexual assaults and buys a property. Sebastian tells Gedeon that Gregor's threatening calls resumed two weeks earlier and that Louisa killed herself the previous week. While suspended, Gedeon continues his own investigation. At a book signing, Charles hands Gregor a copy of his book. An empty envelope is then delivered to Charles. Gregor is revealed to be living next door to Ellie.
8	8	"Angels" (Engerl)	Cyrill Boss, Philipp Stennert	Cyrill Boss, Philipp Stennert	15 February 2019
Hunters discover Milica's corpse. Johanna has retired, and Adam has replaced Gedeon, rejecting his return to active duty. Gedeon steals Milica's files and uses Umid's knife as leverage to persuade the Staatsanwalt to reinstate him. Karim warns Gedeon that Umid has been arrested. Gregor, posing as David, meets Ellie. Gedeon convinces Ellie to reopen Milica's case. She finds Ivana, who confirms that Milica had broken her leg and kept stones. Using Milica's last photograph, Gedeon identifies the mountain inn. Fred and Sara confirm that Milica worked there, and Fred describes the man's cabin in the woods. In the cellar, Gedeon and Ellie find Milica's stones and wood shavings from the Krampus masks. Gregor listens in as Ellie asks to reopen the Krampus case. Gregor's ex-girlfriend leads Gedeon to his address. Ellie arrives home as Gregor enters and removes a raven from its cage; they share a drink. Gedeon realises Gregor is Ellie's neighbour. Gregor professes his love and asks Ellie for a kiss, before exiting the house and getting arrested by police. Gedeon interviews Gregor, who claims that his final work is still underway. Gedeon tells Ellie that Gregor has made a full confession. The next morning, Ellie takes a walk in the forest but becomes critically ill: Gregor has poisoned her and himself with a drink. Gregor dies in prison, while Gedeon manages to find Ellie and to carry her to safety. Despite Karim's death threats, Gedeon remains at Ellie's bedside and tells Ellie that Gregor died. Gedeon drives away but is shot by a motorcyclist.

=== Season two ===
No. overall	No. in season	Title	Directed by	Written by	Original release date
9	1	"Test" (Prüfungen)	Cyrill Boss, Philipp Stennert	Cyrill Boss, Philipp Stennert	21 January 2022
Manni reads a folk tale to Laura. Xandi goes hunting and notices Konstantin walking nearby. Later, Xandi auditions for an orchestra on the piano. Ellie briefs her squad on Ms Fischerauer's death. Yela and Tom interview Fischerauer's carers; one mentions Lisa. Yela sees photographs of Fischerauer's dog and learns that Fischerauer was strangled with its lead. At his workplace, Wolfgang notices Rebecca. Thomas refuses Yela's request to assist with Lisa's interview. Yela visits her father in prison. Xandi picks up Tonia and drops her off at a campsite. Thomas interviews Lisa, who had lent Fischerauer's key to her ex-boyfriend. Xandi arrives at his family's estate and reads his audition rejection letter. Yela and Tom join Thomas's operation to apprehend Lisa's ex-boyfriend. As Ellie works alongside Yela, SWAT officer Thomas approaches; however Ellie, still traumatized from the events of the previous season, sees a Krampus image and raises her gun. Yela snaps Ellie out of it, and Ellie lowers her weapon. Other SWAT officers arrest the suspect. Wolfgang charms Rebecca but leaves abruptly after receiving a phone call. Xandi throws a tantrum, destroying his records and piano, and Wolfgang helps him sober up. Later, Manni and Xandi go hunting, and Manni instructs Xandi in folklore and taxidermy. Gedeon dreams he is driving.
10	2	"Evil in the Eyes" (Das Böse in den Augen)	Cyrill Boss, Philipp Stennert	Cyrill Boss, Philipp Stennert	21 January 2022
Gedeon dreams that he is investigating a woman's insurance fraud. He wakes in a hospital bed, attached to an intravenous drip. Ellie arranges to reinterview Lisa. Thomas refuses to withdraw his accusation that Ellie pointed her gun at him. Yela has not yet completed her report on the incidente and asks Ellie to sit in on Lisa's interview. Xandi stops playing the piano because he believes he isn't good enough. Wolfgang asks Xandi to help with the company's Uttanger project. Xandi stalks Tonia from a hunter's lookout. Yela observes Lisa's interview on a monitor. Ellie argues that Lisa killed Fischerauer with the dog lead and shifted the blame onto her ex-boyfriend. During the interview, Ellie freezes after another Krampus vision, and Lisa is released. Xandi sees Wolfgang kissing Rebecca and leaves his office. Ellie is suspended and ordered to undergo treatment. Gedeon is visited by one of Califati's henchmen, who say that his suffering is enough of a punishment for the family. Tonia is seen running, bleeding and distraught, and she reaches a fence: a guard on the other side is unable to help, and she runs on. Ellie assigns Yela as liaison officer at the scene of Tonia's body. Tonia was tortured with multiple cuts before her throat was slit. While undergoing a facelift, Therese phones Wolfgang and asks him to check in on Xandi.
11	3	"'You Are My Brother'" ("Du bist mein Bruder")	Cyrill Boss, Philipp Stennert	Cyrill Boss, Philipp Stennert	28 January 2022
Gedeon dreams of Oskar and panics during an MRI scan. He recounts his dreams to his psychiatrist but avoids mentioning Oskar. It is established that Tonia had been cycling and camping in Austria. Wolfgang helps Xandi dispose of evidence from Xandi's four-wheel drive. After evading the guard, Tonia ran north, where Xandi killed her, leaving no traces except shoe prints. He then transported Tonia's body and dumped it in the Zill river. Christian presents the killer profile, concluding that the perpetrator seeks total control over his victims to fulfil sexual fantasies. Wolfgang urges Xandi to seek anonymous therapy. Yela discovers Xandi's lookout near Tonia's campsite and sketches an "A.I.P." stamp found inside. The campsite owner reports that children had been frightened by Konstatin. Yela visits Gedeon, who deduces that the killer hopes to remain unnoticed and advises holding a press conference. Manuel opposes the idea, but Christian supports it. After the press conference, Alena contacts the police about a caller who may be the murderer. The police monitor the call when Xandi phones Alena and attempt to locate him. Xandi becomes suspicious and destroys his phone; he had called from near Zill river. Ellie observes Konstatin and searches his house. One year later: Manni gives Xandi the mounted deer head he helped prepare.
12	4	"The Poacher" (Der Wilderer)	Cyrill Boss, Philipp Stennert	Cyrill Boss, Philipp Stennert	28 January 2022
Miriam goes skiing as a van parks nearby; nooses are seen inside the van. Xandi, wearing snow camouflage, stalks her. Wolfgang reads police informant reports on Miriam's murder. Gedeon demonstrates that the same perpetrator attacked Laura. Yela persuades Manuel to hire Gedeon, despite the bullet lodged in his brain. Wolfgang realizes that Xandi can no longer stop and asks Rebecca to leave as Xandi moves in. Daniela tells Manni that Laura was raped before her fall on the ice. Wolfgang frames Manni for Miriam's murder. Manni is questioned, but Gedeon remains unconvinced. Wolfgang is about to plant Miriam's wedding ring at Manni's when Manni arrives home. Wolfgang falsely offers his lawyers and money, and Manni reveals everything he knows. Xandi reads police reports and finds Yela's photograph. After noticing that Manni lied about not knowing Laura, Yela recommends his arrest. Wolfgang warns Manni that the police are about to raid his home. Gedeon contacts Manni's ex-wife, who provides him with an alibi. As SWAT converge on Manni's house, Gedeon calls Yela, who isntructs Manuel to abort the operation. Manni commits suicide and writes "A.I.P." in his blood. Vidino informs Wolfgang that their audit is satisfactory. Yela is suspended pending investigation into Manni's death. She goes to the Zill river, where she unexpectedly encounters Xandi, who recognizes her and tells her "I'm the one you're looking for".
13	5	"Us Two" (Mir zwaa)	Cyrill Boss, Philipp Stennert	Cyrill Boss, Philipp Stennert	4 February 2022
Gedeon experiences a vision of his past while driving. He stops the car and freezes. Manuel refuses to reopen Laura's case despite its connection to Manni. Ellie investigates Yela's murder, determining that she was shot at close range with a rifle on the bank of the Zill river. Gedeon has a vision of Yela waiting in a hospital for news about her father. After meeting Manuel, Ellie reviews Yela's files and recognizes children's sketches of Konstatin. When questiones, Konstatin provides hard drives containing wildlife photographs taken near the Zill river. Police comb through the images and find some showing the back of a man walking along a path. Searching the area, they discover a locked, disused mine entrance leading to a hunters' cache of deer skeletons and antlers. Deeper inside, they find Clara's corpse. Ellie sees "A.I.P." marked on a photograph. Manuel leaks information to Wolfgang's associates. Therese tells Wolfgang that she will step aside so that he can take over. It is revealed that Clara had been repeatedly cut, nursed back to health, then cut again and repeatedly raped. Police believe the killer did not known that Clara had died and lay in wait for his return. Wolfgang warns Xandi to stay away from the mine and expels Rebecca from both his home and the company.
14	6	"The Long Sleep" (Der lange Schlaf)	Cyrill Boss, Philipp Stennert	Cyrill Boss, Philipp Stennert	4 February 2022
Five years earlier: Therese vetoes Wolfgang's Uttanger project, which would have never been approved because of government restrictions. Wolfgang gives Laura a toy musical carousel. Current: Ludwig purchased the lock to the mine. His widow explains arietem in perpetuum ("A.I.P." Animals Forever), an unofficial hunting club with influential members. Ludwig left the group when younger members turned it into a brothel. After Laura was raped, the club disbanded, and its members signed non-disclosure agreements with Vidino. Vidino refuses to cooperate with Gedeon and Ellie. Xandi abducts his next victim, Natalia. Past: Xandi drives Laura and Wolfgang to a club party. Current: Ellie investigates Natalia's disappearance, and Gedeon advises her to use Califati's contacts. In exchange for Vidino's book listing "A.I.P." members, they provide police files on Califati's rivals. One of Wolfgang's associates orders Manuel to hand over all information on Gedeon and Ellie. Vidino's book includes a list of women who were paid off. One of them, Rosalie, identifies Wolfgang and Xandi as Laura's rapists. Laura possessed an incriminating video of the members' secret dealings, and Wolfgang wanted her silenced. Past: Manni demands that Laura hand over the video. When she refuses, he pushes her; she falls and strikes her head. After returning home, Laura lapses into a coma.
15	7	"Behind the Mask" (Hinter der Maske)	Cyrill Boss, Philipp Stennert	Cyrill Boss, Philipp Stennert	11 February 2022
Xandi tends to Natalia's wounds before resuming his torture. He hides her at an unlisted property. Wolfgang is arrested at his office, and Xandi is taken into custody at a shopping center. Ellie and Ben interview Xandi, who feigns cooperation and dismisses his lawyer. Gedeon and Manuel question Wolfgang, who denies any involvement with Laura. Alena confirms that Xandi is the man who fantasized about cutting women. Ellie and Gedeon interrogate Xandi, who admits to having such fantasies but claims he called a helpline and recovered. Ellie later speaks to Xandi alone, without a recording, and he admits to killing the woman. Vidino interrupts and terminates the interview. Both Wolfgang and Xandi are released after Manuel has disclosed everything to Vidino. Manuel admits to Gedeon that he has been acting as the Gössens' mole and subsequently leaves the police force. Gedeon collapses and is taken to the hospital. Therese arranges for Xandi to be hidden in South Africa. Natalia escapes from the locked room and reaches Alfons's barn. As Xandi drives to the airport, Alfons flags him down and asks for help for Natalia. Ellie comes to terms with her Krampus visions and discovers Laura's video files. One recording shows Wolfgang and Jörg discussing bribing officials to change laws for Wofgang's Uttanger project.
16	8	"Betrayal" (Verrat)	Cyrill Boss, Philipp Stennert	Cyrill Boss, Philipp Stennert	11 February 2022
Therese secretly meets Gedeon and bribes him to retrieve Wolfgang's rifle from the evidence store. Ellie sends Laura's video file to Wolfgang and strikes a deal to have Xandi arrested in exchange for the footage. Police capture Xandi and rescue Natalia. At his arraignment, Xandi provides details of all his murders, except Yela's. He shows neither remorse nor empathy for his victims, admitting that inflicting pain and achieving sexual gratification motivated him. Both Austrian and German authorities declare the Zill killings case closed. Ellie returns to duty but remains dissatisfied with Xandi's account of Yela's murder. She uncovers evidence that Wolfgang's car was near the scene when Yela was killed. Ellie illegally interviews Xandi in prison, where he confirms that Wolfgang knew about the Zill murders from Tonia onwards. Xandi suggests that Wolfgang may have killed Yela, or that he may be fabricating the claim. Ellie discovers that Gedeon smuggled the rifle out of the evidence locker in exchange for Therese arranging for a neurosurgeon to remove the bullet from his brain. As a result of her unauthorised investigations in Austria, Ellie is dismissed from the German police force. Meanwhile, Gedeon is praised and returns to active duty, setting his sights on capturing Oskar. Ellie tells Gedeon that she will get justice for Yela.

=== Season three ===
No. overall	No. in season	Title	Directed by	Written by	Original release date
17	1	"Episode 1" (Folge 1)	Christopher Schier	Robert Buchschwenter, Senad Halilbasic, Christopher Schier	4 May 2023
A boy hesitates at the edge of a forest. Ellie apologises to Yela's father, but he rebuffs her. Six months later: motorcyclist Samir is killed in a staged collision. Ellie and Rafael sleep together. Felix rolls a die to determine whether a person will live (Α) or die (Ω). Ellie is outraged when the Gössens begin chalet construction and becomes determined to indict Gedeon for smuggling the rifle. Gedeon enters rehab and recalls burning a painting. Ellie observes the construction site. Gedeon returns to work as German police investigate Samir's death. Felix gives a witness statement. Ben is in charge during Gedeon's absence. Ellie remains cool toward Nadine. Gedeon researches the owners of Oskar's paintings. Svoboda asks Ellie for stronger evidence. Felix photographs Samir and then snaps his neck. Rafael is reluctant to obtain evidence for Ellie. Gedeon hallucinates, imagining himself standing over his own gravestone. His doctor prescribes fentanyl patches for pain but recommends further tests. Marianne arrives at a mountain cabin; Felix rolls the die and gets Ω. Marianne screams when she sees a hooded man – Felix – who drags her away. Her fiancé, Volker, searches for her. Felix pours petrol around Marianne, who is chained to a post, and photographs her as she burns. Volker hears her screams and runs outside, but is forced back by the flames. He sees Felix, who fires at him; Volker escaped by jumping off a cliff into the river. Ellie is interviewed by Internal Affairs.
18	2	"Episode 2" (Folge 2)	Christopher Schier	Robert Buchschwenter, Senad Halilbasic, Christopher Schier	4 May 2023
A boy enters the forest and joins other children around fire: all of them are masked. Gedeon's team attends the scene of Marianne's body. Gedeon follows Volker's path to cliff, unaware that Stefan is watching him. Volker is found unconscious and is taken to hospital. Superintendent Heinze assigns Nadine as the task force liaison with Gedeon, leaving Ellie insulted at being sidelined. Rafael searches Gedeon's desk but is caught in the act by Gedeon. Felix processes photographs. Ellie is determined to join the task force. Gedeon introduces Nadine to the team and removes Rafael from the task force. Nadine and Ben return to the crime scene. Gedeon phones the owner of one of Oskar's paintings, who denies any connection. Ben recounts an historical murder by Satanists involving a woman burned alive; the group members bore the SMTP tattoo, and only one of them, Kai, survived. The satanists filmed the killing. Stefan smears blood over himself. Ellie explains Gedeon's betrayal to Nadine, who refuses to assist Ellie in her unethical investigation of Gedeon. Ellie secretly takes case files from Nadine's desk. Rafael joins Internal Affairs in questioning Ellie and asks about her relationship with Gedeon. Gedeon confronts the painting's owner and destroys the artwork; the owner provides the Italian phone number of the seller. Gedeon hallucinates while driving. Ellie is appointed task force liaison after her case notes are discovered in a café. Gedeon watches footage of himself as a child. Ellie enters the task force headquarters, where she is greeted by Ben and Gedeon.
19	3	"Episode 3" (Folge 3)	Thomas W. Kiennast	Robert Buchschwenter, Senad Halilbasic, Christopher Schier	11 May 2023
A child refuses to crush a mouse with rock. A cowled figure shows boy a die marked with Ω. Children walk past the body of a child hanging from a rope. Gedeon calls the Italian number but the business is closed. Ben informs Ellie that there is no identifiable DNA and that Gedeon is unreachable. Ellie notices evidence of a dog in the hut. Kai claims that the victim was a willing sacrifice, and says that their protector instructed him to kill the woman. Ellie and Gedeon meet Kai's deaf mother and obtain his work address. Kai's alibi is that he was working night shifts at a turkey farm, and he claims to have repented. Tobias's throat is slit by Felix, who photographs the scene. Tobias's wife enters and screams as Stefan watches from afar. Ben notifies Ellie of Tobias' death. Charles tells Ellie that there is a Gössen connection between Marianne and Tobias: Tobias sold chalet land after his father refused, and Marianne rezoned land to enable the deal. Ina leads protests against the Gössen chalets. Gedeon doubts the link between the murders but asks Pia to obtain Tobias's files. An Internal Affairs officer questions Ellie about Gedeon's drug use; Ellie reports finding no evidence. Felix prints photographs of Tobias. Volker recounts finding Marianne burning and says that someone fired a gun as he fled. Pia recovers Felix's bullet. Gedeon deduces that Ellie leaked story to Charles. Kai's mother berates him over the police visit. Kai and Felix pray, "sequere me, te protegam". Gedeon searches an Italian villa, but is knocked unconscious by an unknown assailant.
20	4	"Episode 4" (Folge 4)	Christopher Schier	Robert Buchschwenter, Senad Halilbasic, Christopher Schier	18 May 2023
Andreas walks his dog, Stella, and shoots bird. He reads Charles' murder report and masturbates to Felix' photographs of the victims. Gedeon disarms an elderly man who sold a painting to cover rent after Oskar was hospitalized. Ellie confronts Charles, accusing him of including too much detail and making her colleagues suspicious. Charles tells her that Gedeon will meet Therese. Gedeon burns another painting. Thomas questions the similarities between Charles's report and Ellie's theory linking the murders. Ellie and Ben interview Ina, who claims not to know Tobias; it is alleged that Tobias was attacked by protesters. Gedeon hallucinates about his younger self and is summoned to meet Therese. Kai fails to turn up for work. Thomas informs Gedeon that the gun has been identified as one stolen by Andreas. Ellie and Ben arrest Andreas, who refuses to acknowledge their authority and asks for a lawyer. Gedeon tells the team that they have little time to find further evidence. Kai performs rituals and drinks turkey blood. Andreas is released. Ellie tells Internal Affairs that she never saw Gedeon meet Therese. Charles tells Ellie that the meeting between Therese and Gedeon is taking place. Rafael blocks Ellie's car to talk about their relationship, preventing her from following Gedeon; Ellie and Rafael argue and break up. Charles tells Ellie that Ina and Tobias were having an affair. Therese gives Gedeon Oskar's medical files. Waldi tells Gedeon that he has never heard of Oskar. Ellie goes to Gedeon's apartment to find evidence and discovers that he is investigating Oskar, before seeing him collapse as he returns home. She brings an unconscious Gedeon inside. She finds a book of Autrian lore, with a personal inscription from Yela to Gedeon. Felix kills Peter while Stefan watches.
21	5	"Episode 5" (Folge 5)	Thomas W. Kiennast	Robert Buchschwenter, Senad Halilbasic, Christopher Schier	25 May 2023
A boy carries a bucket through the forest. A man bathes in blood as children look on nearby. The boy is chased by horsemen. Sven analyzes Tobias's chat history and discovers that Tobias and Ina were lovers, but he cannot determine whether Andreas sold gun to Felix. Gedeon is unsettled by hallucinations and memories. Ellie questions Ina about her relationship with Tobias; Ina says she hoped Tobias would halt the land sale, but they later broke up when he wanted a more romantic relationship. Ellie and Gedeon attend the scene of schoolteacher Peter's body, which is found at a swimming pool, another victim of the serial killer. Rafael asks Ellie why she has changed her opinion on Gedeon; Ellie admits she was mistaken earlier. Thomas determines that Peter was killed with a sharp stone. Christian states that Kai fits the killer's profile. A surveillance team discover Kai's body, along with a suicide note. Gedeon notices a drawing by Kai depicting Stefan. Police dismantle the protesters' campsite as Ina returns. Rafael refuses to see Ellie. Gedeon reads about Jackl the Knacker, who gathered and taught children in the forest. Christian notes that the killer is becoming bolder with each murder. Ellie asks Charles for help in implicating Andreas. Police now believe Samir was murdered, having found cable-wire marks inside the tunnel. A witness recalls seeing Stefan watching him. Ellie finds Stefan's cave, containing candles, a disfaced Virgin Mary statue, and Felix's prayer. Ellie tells Gedeon that someone is hiding in the forest.
22	6	"Episode 6" (Folge 6)	Thomas W. Kiennast	Robert Buchschwenter, Senad Halilbasic, Christopher Schier	27 May 2023
Forensic investigators analyze the cave as Stefan watches the police. Historians explain the symbolism of the Virgin of Mercy and provide a translation of the prayer. Gedeon tells Ellie that his mother, Hilde, has died and recounts how they once lived in Oskar's commune, where Gedeon was abused. Gedeon sorts through Hilde's belongings. Charles looks for a spyware installer. Ben interviews Felix about Samir's death; Felix claims he was merely a passer-by. Christian suggests that the desecration of Mary indicates hatred toward a maternal figure. Gedeon theorises that the killer is following a role model. Almost naked, Felix enters a forest hut. A folklorist recounts the history of Jackl the Knacker and the related witch trials, explaining that Jackl used sacred places such as large stones, waterfalls, and caves. Felix and Stefan recite the prayer together. Charles interviews Andreas. Ellie struggle to understand Jackl's connection to case, but Gedeon believes there's more to uncover. Charles installs spyware on Andreas's computer. Gedeon reviews Kai's interviews and concludes that Kai knew Jackl. Police re-examine Kai's drawings and writings. Using the spyware, Charles discovers Felix' photographs on Andreas's computer. Andreas arrives, brutally beats Charles, and steals his computer. During the Internal Affairs interview, Rafael pressures Ellie to incriminate Gedeon, but she refuses. It is revealed that Kai met Stefan and learned Satanism from him. Ellie visits Charles in hospital, where he tells her about a USB backup and reveals that Therese paid Charles to cast suspicion on Ina. Sven uses Kai's notes to identify the meetings location. As police approach a hut, it explodes. Stefan suddenly appears behind Ellie and Gedeon.
23	7	"Episode 7" (Folge 7)	Christopher Schier	Robert Buchschwenter, Senad Halilbasic, Christopher Schier	27 May 2023
A boy is captured by horsemen as they hunt Jackl. Ellie and Gedeon interview Stefan, who acknowledges Kai's painting and admits to having protected Kai. Stefan claims that he hasn't killed anyone and identifies four victims. Christian concludes that Stefan believes himself to be Jackl, while Ellie insists they need to establish Stefan's connection to the victims. The boy leads the horsemen to Jackl's cave, where heo is burned alive; the other children scatter, and Jackl escapes. Police discover Andreas's copies of the photographs of Felix's victims, along with additional images of corpses. Felix's father, Milan, is found shot with same weapon. Stefan's mother, Irmgard, a residen in an aged-care facility, died of a heart attack. Stefan insists he did not kill Irmgard but says she failed to protect him. Gedeon begins hallucinating, and the interview is halted as he relives the trauma of Oskar's abuse. Charles sends Ellie an audio recording of Gedeon and Therese discussing the concealment of Wolfgang's rifle. Nadine enters the Internal Affairs interview, and Ellie is revealed to have suspected Gedeon of smuggling the rifle. Gedeon finds a photograph of Hilde with Oskar at Waldi's home and retrieves Wolfgang's rifle. Ellie instructs Ben to lead the search for Andreas, then follows Gedeon to Waldi's. Inside Andreas's secure room, Andreas kills Ben and flees. Oskar calls out for Waldi as Gedeon confronts him, holding the rifle but hesitating. Oskar fails to recognize Gedeon and attempts to justify the sexual abuse. Gedeon kills Oskar. Ellie arrives, and Gedeon hands her the rifle. Ellie prevents Gedeon from confessing, insisting that they must first complete the murder investigation.
24	8	"Episode 8" (Folge 8)	Thomas W. Kiennast, Christopher Schier	Robert Buchschwenter, Senad Halilbasic, Christopher Schier	27 May 2023
Andreas views CCTV footage showing the police entering the hallway. He kills Stella and then shoots himself in the head. Gedeon burns Oskar's painting. Pia realizes that Felix had been Irmgard's carer. Stefan was exclaustrated 20 years earlier and the children had lied. Felix met Stefan once. Stefan justifies frightening children through blood rituals. Gedeon is hospitalized with an aneurysm. Stefan claims that Felix was his student. Thomas links Felix to Milan. Police obtain a search warrant, but Felix has disappeared, leaving only his laptop behind. Ellie discovers a secret door leading to dark room with photographs of corpses and the Jackl prayer. She returns to Jackl's cave and finds Felix. Felix admits to killing Milan, saying he enjoyed the feeling at the moment of his death and wanted to repeat it. He explains that his victims were chosen at random by rolling the Α/Ω die. Felix then slits his own wrist and photographs his own dying face. Ellie sits at Gedeon's bedside and tells him what happened to Felix. Stefan is released, as the police cannot connect him to Felix's murders. Internal Affairs begin questioning Ellie after Felix's death. Gedeon asks for a piece of paper and his mobile phone. Nadine questions Ellie about Oskar's death by rifle, but Ellie responds that Nadine has only conjecture and not hard evidence. After Ellie leaves, Rafael confronts her, asking why she is protecting Gedeon; Ellie replies that injustice is sometimes committed to restore justice. Gedeon connects Stefan to Felix's murders by noting that the victims' initials match those of the prayers, and that the four victimns were children from Stefan's youth group. Ellie disposes of Wolfgang's rifle. Ellie and Gedeon dance together in café.

== Production ==
Co-creator Philipp Stennert acknowledged that Der Pass was inspired by the 2011 Danish-Swedish series, Broen | Bron (English:The Bridge) and observed, "Apart from the premise of two countries working together and finding a body on the border, everything else is pretty much a completely new story." The creators researched serial killers, including their online interviews, in developing the character of Gregor Ansbach (Franz Hartwig). The process was assisted by criminal profiler Alexander Horn (profiler). Unusually for a crime drama, the antagonist, Gregor, is revealed early in the series and has a more visible presence. Another deliberate effort is the evolution of both protagonists. Gedeon starts as a jaded, cynical and corrupt officer who becomes dedicated to catching Gregor, and who is protective of Ellie. Meanwhile, Ellie starts as a committed, enthusiastic and by-the-book officer who becomes a rule-breaker, slightly burned out and traumatised. Stennart described Ellie's character as difficult to write, "[one] who is truly good but also interesting."

Filming of Der Pass took place from November 2017 to April 2018 in both Austria and Germany, at Bad Gastein, Berchtesgaden, Graz, Söcking, Vienna, Grundlsee and Sportgastein. The series was co-produced by the Austrian company Epo-Film and the German company Wiedemann & Berg Film Production,. Production was supported by FilmFernsehFonds Bayern, Fernsehfonds Austria, the film funding of the state of Salzburg, the CINESTYRIA Filmcommission and Fonds and Film Commission Graz. Additional crew members were Andreas Baltschun and Lucas Seeberger for film editing, Thomas Oláh on costume design, Heike Lange on set design, Herbert Verdino, Walter Fiklocki and Quirin Böhm for original sound, Nico Krebsfor on final sound design and mixing, and Tatjana Luckdorf and Evgenia Popova on make-up Design.

The second season filming began in January 2020, however, it was delayed by restrictions due to the COVID-19 pandemic and resumed in April and continued intermittently to December 2020. For this season, Stennert described how, "It's so interesting to see how someone becomes a perpetrator in the first place. So this time we wanted to start following this guy before the first corpse." Broadcasting started on 21 January 2022 on Sky Deutschland and ZDF.

== Reception ==
Ray Flook of Bleeding Cool reviewed the pilot episode of Pagan Peak, which depicts "crime scenes with symbolically posed victims, reminiscent of pagan rituals." Die Presse's Anna-Marie Wallner observed the series title, Der Pass, has multiple meanings, both the geographical location between Austria and Germany and the annual festival group of St Nicholas, Krampus and the Angel. Wallner praised the "courageous and rather unusual" storyline, where the villain is revealed to the audience in episode 3 while "tension nevertheless persists." Der Spiegel's Oliver Kaever felt, "It is about isolation, the power of the Internet and digital surveillance fantasies... [and] the enormously spreading grief here that man is a wolf to man. And the world is not a place that forgives."
