= Southern noir =

Subgenre of crime fiction

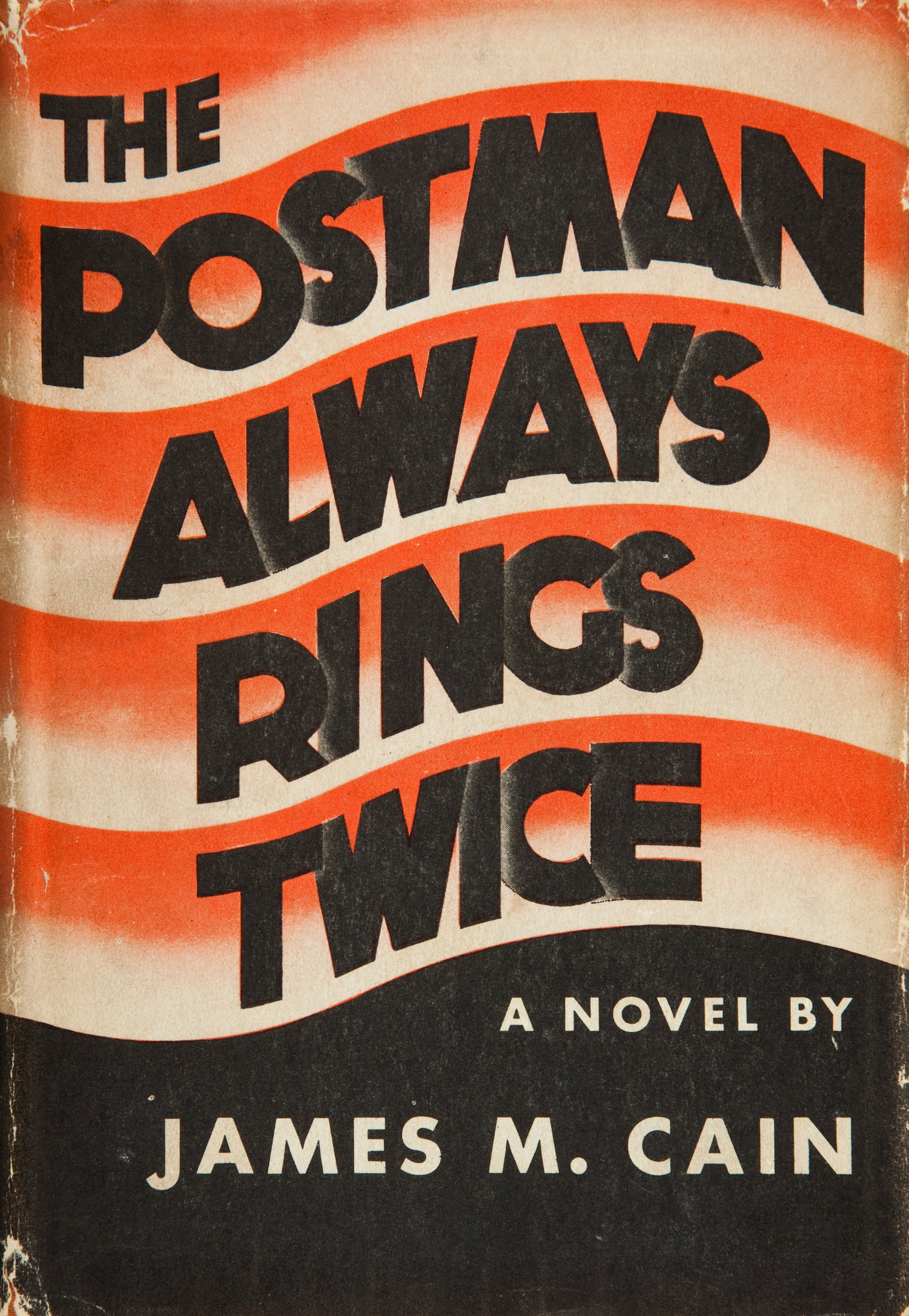
Cover of the first edition of The Postman Always Rings Twice (1934), an early example of Southern noir

Southern noir (also known as rural noir) is a genre of crime fiction set in the American South. It is considered a subgenre of noir fiction and often deals with themes related to poverty, racism, and violence.

== Characteristics ==
Southern noir is a subgenre of crime fiction, specifically noir fiction. It is typically written from the point of view of a character who is a perpetrator, victim, or investigator of a crime. It is characterized by its focus on the setting of the American South, but can more broadly include the South, the Ozarks, Appalachia, the Midwest and the Southwestern United States. It typically takes place in rural settings, with vivid, poetic descriptions of landscape and place. These settings typically incorporate Southern Gothic aesthetics, and explore elements of religion and the supernatural.

Southern noir stories can take place in the present day or in the past. The narratives and characters of Southern law are deeply affected by the socioeconomic issues facing the American South in the modern day, including the loss of family farms and factory jobs. The failure of the American Dream in Southern noir leaves rural communities without outside assistance or hope. Poverty, racism, alcoholism, drug addiction, intergenerational conflict, misogyny, sexual violence, and inequality are frequently explored. Law enforcement are typically complicit in racist violence and Black characters face difficulty receiving justice.

Protagonists in Southern noir fiction are often outsiders in their communities. Characters are typically forced into situations that require them to navigate brutal violence and gray morality.

== History ==
Early examples of Southern noir include The Postman Always Rings Twice (1934) by James M. Cain, Intruder in the Dust (1948) by William Faulkner, and Deliverance (1970) by James Dickey, each of which has been retroactively described as having characteristics common to the genre. One of the first authors to use the term "country noir" was Daniel Woodrell, whose novel Give Us a Kiss was originally titled Give Us A Kiss: A Country Noir. Woodrell later distanced himself from the term, saying that "The use of the term noir is too limiting. I didn’t realize that when I used Country Noir to describe my work, but the word noir is defined by so many ways by so many people that it is essentially useless as a descriptive terms".

Other authors known for writing Southern noir literature include Brian Panowich, S. A. Cosby, James Lee Burke, Tayari Jones, William Gay, Attica Locke, David Joy, Jesmyn Ward, Eli Cranor, and Kelly J. Ford. Many Southern noir writers come from rural regions, and in recent years many African-American authors have become prominent in the genre.

The Lonesome Dove series by Larry McMurtry, Cold in July by Joe R. Lansdale, and No Country for Old Men by Cormac McCarthy, along with its 2007 film adaptation, have been called "Texas noir". Television series like Quarry, True Detective, Bloodline, and Ozark are also considered developments in the Southern noir genre.

== Media ==
A number of works have been described as being a part of the Southern noir genre.

=== Literature ===
- The Postman Always Rings Twice (1934)
- They Don't Dance Much (1940)
- Intruder in the Dust (1948)
- The Executioners (1957)
- The Violent Bear It Away (1960)
- Pop. 1280 (1964)
- Outer Dark (1968)
- Deliverance (1970)
- Lonesome Dove (1985)
- The Neon Rain (1987)
- Fried Green Tomatoes at the Whistle Stop Cafe (1987)
- Cold in July (1989)
- A Time to Kill (1989)
- Give Us A Kiss (1996)
- No Country for Old Men (2005)
- The World Made Straight (2006)
- Sharp Objects (2006)
- The Devil All the Time (2011)
- Bluebird, Bluebird (2017)
- Dear Martin (2018)
- My Darkest Prayer (2018)
- Blacktop Wasteland (2020)
- When These Mountains Burn (2020)
- Razorblade Tears (2021)
- All the Sinners Bleed (2023)

=== Films ===
- The Postman Always Rings Twice (1946)
- The Red House (1947)
- They Live by Night (1948)
- Moonrise (1948)
- Key Largo (1948)
- Cape Fear (1962)
- Deliverance (1972)
- The Postman Always Rings Twice (1981)
- Body Heat (1981)
- Blood Simple (1984)
- Cape Fear (1991)
- Fried Green Tomatoes (1991)
- One False Move (1992)
- Heaven's Prisoners (1996)
- A Time to Kill (1996)
- The Gingerbread Man (1998)
- Palmetto (1998)
- Wild Things (1998)
- No Country for Old Men (2007)
- Winter's Bone (2010)
- Mud (2012)
- Out of the Furnace (2013)
- A Single Shot (2013)
- Cold in July (2014)
- Three Billboards Outside Ebbing, Missouri (2017)
- Tomato Red (2017)
- Galveston (2018)
- Donnybrook (2018)
- The Devil All the Time (2020)
- Desperation Road (2023)
- Fast Charlie (2023)

=== Television ===
- Lonesome Dove (1989)
- Return to Lonesome Dove (1993)
- Lonesome Dove: The Series (1994-1996)
- Justified (2010-2015)
- True Detective (seasons 1 and 3, 2014, 2019)
- Quarry (2015-2016)
- Bloodline (2015-2017)
- Ozark (2017-2020)
- Sharp Objects (2018)

== See also ==
- Noir fiction
- Southern United States literature
