= They Would Never Hurt a Fly =

2003 novel by Slavenka Drakulić

- First edition
- Author: Slavenka Drakulić
- Language: English
- Genre: Non-fiction, History
- Publisher: Little, Brown
- Publication date: 2003
- Media type: Print (paperback)
- Pages: 182
- ISBN: 0-349-11775-6

They Would Never Hurt a Fly (Croatian: Oni ne bi ni mrava zgazili) is a 2004 book by Croatian journalist Slavenka Drakulić. The book covers the proceedings of the International Criminal Tribunal for the Former Yugoslavia specifically focusing on the personalities and individual crimes of the war criminals. Drakulić uses certain trials of alleged criminals with subordinate power to further examine and understand the reasoning behind their crimes.

== Synopsis ==
They Would Never Hurt a Fly begins with an introductory section explaining Drakulić's purpose in the book as well as her choice in characters. She explains that she would like to learn more about their personalities to justify how the Yugoslavian war arose. Drakulić describes the war as an unexpected tragedy that befell innocent civilians within the boundaries of Yugoslavia - specifically Bosnia. Drakulić argues that many of the criminals, specifically lower ranking criminals, were not complete monsters but ordinary people who committed crimes due to the circumstances they were in. The book builds on Hannah Arendt's thesis on the Banality of Evil specifically invoking the idea to understand the conflict. The book highlights this argument through the actions of the prisoners, regardless of nationality, in Scheveningen prison in the Hague, where criminals from all sides of the conflict freely smoked and played games with each other.

== Reception ==
Drakulić received the 2005 Leipzig Book Award for European Understanding for this work.

=== Popular Reviews ===
Melissa Benn of The Guardian commends Drakulić for how she "demonstrates no little moral courage" in revisiting these historical events so soon after the conflict ended. Benn speaks positively of Drakulić's high level of detail and handling of moral ambiguity.

=== Academic Reviews ===
Jens Becker, a German academic specializing in the modern Balkans, highlights how Drakulić's personal history growing up in Yugoslavia adds necessary context to her book's discussions, in his review for the Journal for Labour and Social Affairs in Eastern Europe. Becker applauds in particular how Drakulić explores why the war began, how nationalism developed in a generation born into an integrated environment postwar, and why individuals charged as war criminals are still considered heroes in their home countries. Becker highlights Drakulić's exploration of Slobodan Milosevic, as she "deprives him of his demonic aura by forming an intelligent portrait," thereby providing a fuller account than one possible with use of just his political or wartime life.

== People covered ==
- Rahim Ademi
- Milan Čanić
- Dražen Erdemović
- Stjepan Grandić
- Goran Jelisić
- Radovan Karadžić
- Radomir Kovač
- Radislav Krstić
- Dragoljub Kunarac
- Milan Levar
- Mirjana Marković
- Slobodan Milošević
- Ratko Mladić
- Mirko Norac
- Dragan Obrenović
- Tihomir Orešković
- Biljana Plavšić
- Ivica Rožić
- Zoran Vuković
