= Filip Schnack =

German actor (born 2001)

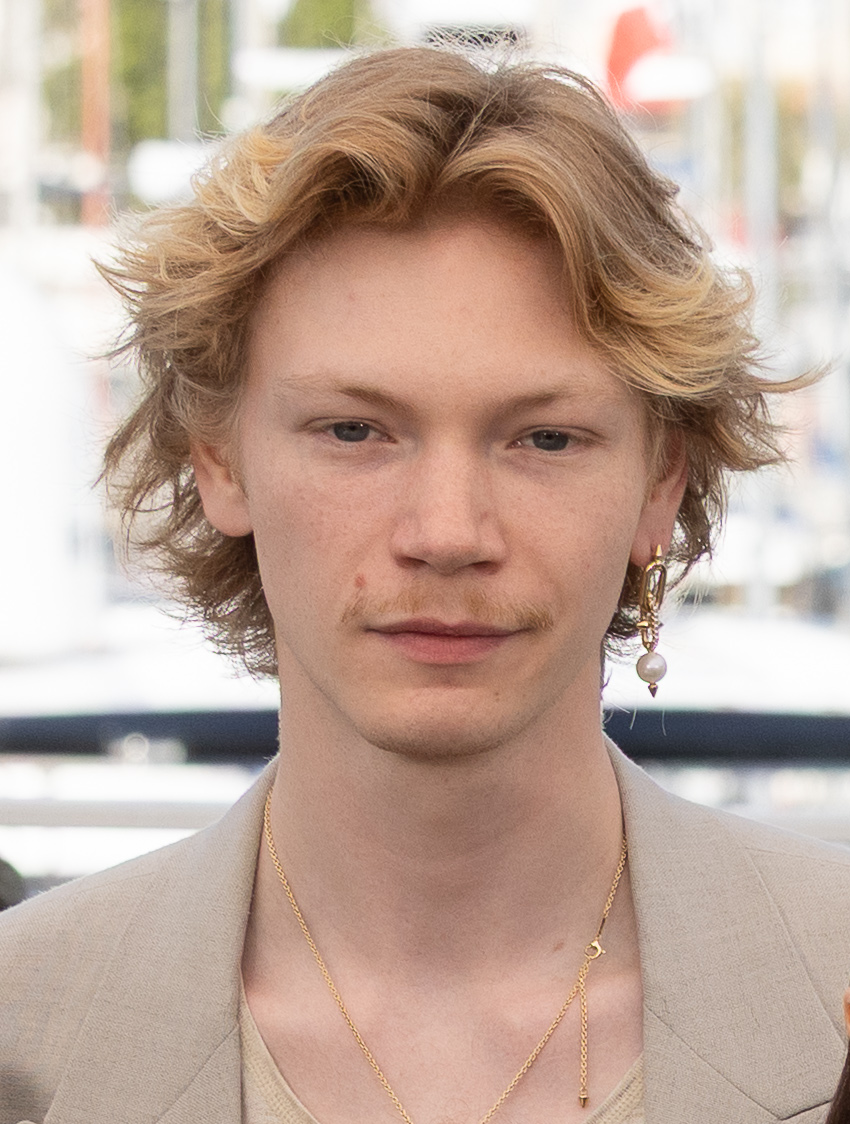
- Schnack at the 2025 Cannes Film Festival
- Born: 27 March 2001 (age 24); Lübeck, Schleswig-Holstein, Germany
- Occupation: Actor
- Years active: 2022–present

Filip Schnack (born 27 March 2001) is a German actor.

== Biography ==
Schnack was born in Lübeck. At the age of 17, he moved to Japan to pursue modeling. He later moved to Hamburg to train as an actor; he lives in Ottensen.

In 2025, he played Steve in the Netflix miniseries Cassandra and Fritz in the film Sound of Falling.

== Filmography ==
=== Film ===
Year	Title	Role	Ref.
2025	Die drei ??? und der Karpatenhund	Skinny Norris	
2025	Sound of Falling	Fritz	

=== Television ===
Year	Title	Role	Notes	Ref.
2022	Mordsschwestern – Verbrechen ist Familiensache	Fred Braun	1 episode	
2022	SOKO Wismar	Luis Braun	12 episodes	
2022	Deadlines	Jens	4 episodes	
2022	Die Pfefferkörner	Tom Berger	1 episode	
2022	Die Quellen des Bösen	Marc Bandow	6 episodes	
2023	Notruf Hafenkante	Timo	Miniseries	
2024	Heiter bis tödlich: Morden im Norden	Leon Ruff	1 episode	
2025	Großstadtrevier	Benjamin "Ben" Eggert	1 episode	
2025	Tatort: Herz der Dunkelheit	Kevin	1 episode	
2025	Cassandra	Steve	6 episodes	
2025	Schattenseite	Nathan		
