= Gaza (film) =

Documentary film by Garry Keane and Andrew McConnell

- Film poster
- Directed by: Garry Keane; Andrew McConnell
- Produced by: Brendan J. Byrne; Christian Beetz; Garry Keane; Andrew McConnell; Paul Cadieux
- Cinematography: Andrew McConnell
- Edited by: Mick Mahon
- Music by: Ray Fabi
- Production companies: Real Films, gebrueder beetz filmproduktion
- Release date: January 2019 (Sundance)
- Running time: 92 minutes
- Countries: Ireland; Canada
- Language: Palestinian Arabic

Gaza (Arabic: غزة, romanized: Ghazza) is a 2019 documentary film directed by Irish filmmakers Garry Keane and Andrew McConnell, which premiered at the Sundance Film Festival. It portrays the everyday life of Gazan citizens. It was selected as the Irish entry for the Best International Feature Film at the 92nd Academy Awards, but it was not nominated.

== Reception ==
Gaza has received generally positive reviews from critics. As of October 2021, 96% of the 23 reviews compiled on Rotten Tomatoes are positive, with an average rating of 7.6/10. The website's critics consensus reads: "Uniquely revelatory and altogether enlightening, Gaza allows audiences to settle into the unique rhythms of ordinary life in a region roiled by conflict."

The film was also rated four stars by Wendy Ide, a reviewer from The Observer, and Peter Bradshaw.

== See also ==
- List of submissions to the 92nd Academy Awards for Best International Feature Film
- List of Irish submissions for the Academy Award for Best International Feature Film
