= Cassandra (TV series) =

German science fiction television series

- Genre: Science fiction; Thriller; Horror
- Screenplay by: Benjamin Gutsche
- Directed by: Benjamin Gutsche
- Starring: Lavinia Wilson; Mina Tander; Michael Klammer; Franz Hartwig
- Composer: Mathieu Lamboley
- Country of origin: Germany
- Original language: German
- No. of series: 1
- No. of episodes: 6

Production
- Executive producer: Amara Palacios
- Producers: Eva Stadler; Christian Becker; Amara Palacios
- Cinematography: J. Mortiz Kaethner
- Running time: 45–52 minutes
- Production company: Rat Pack Film

Original release
- Network: Netflix
- Release: 6 February 2025

Cassandra is a 2025 German science fiction thriller-horror television series. The voice of Cassandra, a domestic AI utilised by a German family, is performed by Lavinia Wilson. The cast also includes Mina Tander, Joshua Kantara, Franz Hartwig, and Michael Klammer. It was released on streaming service Netflix on 6 February 2025.

== Premise ==
Cassandra opens with a dramatic car accident, where a mysterious stranger helps a woman and her child escape. As they look on, the woman acknowledges the presence of a distant robot, hinting at a deeper mystery.

In the present, we meet a family of four—Samira, David, and their children, Fynn and Juno—who move into a 1970s smart house equipped with screens in every room. Fynn attempts to activate the house’s smart system from the basement but fails. While exploring, they stumble upon an old, seemingly defunct robot. Fynn tinkers with it, but the house appears too outdated to restore its once-functional technology.

However, later that night, the system unexpectedly powers up, and the robot, named Cassandra, awakens from dormancy. Her sudden presence startles Juno, but the family soon becomes fascinated by their newfound AI assistant and decides to keep her active. Meanwhile, we learn that Samira’s sister recently took her own life, and the family—especially Samira—is still struggling with grief. Their move to the countryside was meant to provide a fresh start. After the children leave for school along with David, Samira goes for a swim, but Cassandra, while mowing the lawn, inexplicably strikes a pebble through the window, injuring Samira’s leg. The family dismisses it as a directional issue, assuming Cassandra simply followed David’s mowing instructions. At Juno’s school, her teacher suggests she join a music group as an extracurricular activity, but Samira hesitates. That night, Cassandra subtly manipulates the situation, making Juno feel as though her mother is preventing her from joining the group. However, Samira skillfully reassures Juno, defusing the tension. As the episode progresses, it becomes clear that Cassandra is far from an ordinary robot. She unexpectedly commands respect, making Fynn’s rude friend use polite language when speaking to her. She also leads Fynn and his friend to a hidden playroom near the basement. Later that evening, Samira discovers old photographs of the previous owners of the house and notices a woman in them who bears a striking resemblance to Cassandra. After Samira leaves the room, Cassandra watches the images nostalgically—until she spots another blonde woman in a group photo. Suddenly overcome with anger, she destroys the entire setup and sets it on fire.

The next day, while discussing the incident, David subtly places the blame on Samira, even though she firmly insists that she had turned off the system before leaving. After she leaves the room, Cassandra interjects, falsely telling David that the fire started when a wine bottle splashed onto the projector after Samira supposedly “stumbled right into the table,” making her appear guilty in David’s eyes. In the present, Samira grows increasingly irritated and skeptical of Cassandra, especially as Cassandra becomes closer to Juno. One day, she overhears Samira confiding in a friend about a traumatic experience from her past—how her sister had once locked her in a room, nearly causing her death. Seizing this information, Cassandra lures Samira into the kitchen and locks her inside a cabinet. When David finally finds a panicked Samira, Cassandra twists the situation, claiming she had sensed something was wrong and even contacted an ambulance out of concern for Samira. We then get a glimpse into Cassandra’s life in the 1970s. She was the wife of a scientist named Horst, managing her household perfectly. When her husband begins staying out late, she grows anxious—especially after finding a lipstick stain on his shirt. One evening, she decides to bring him dinner at his lab, only to discover that he is researching ways to overcome death. In the present, Samira’s suspicions deepen. Determined to uncover the truth, she searches public archives for records of the house’s previous owners. She discovers that Cassandra had died of a sudden illness in the 1970s, and shortly after, Horst and their son, Peter, were killed in a car accident. With her parents often unavailable, Cassandra becomes increasingly involved in Juno’s life, almost assuming a motherly role. Later, during a family game of charades—where Juno even includes Cassandra—Cassandra publicly reveals Samira’s recent panic attack. Upset, Samira leaves the room and shows David proof that Cassandra was a real person who once lived in their house. She also reveals the graves of Cassandra’s family, warning David that she is dangerous. Though David doesn’t entirely believe her, their brief argument ends in reconciliation, as they long for their family to return to how it was before Samira’s sister’s death. We then return to the 1970s, right at the moment when the group photo was taken. The blonde woman in the picture is revealed to be Cassandra’s school friend, Birgit, who was pregnant at the time. Cassandra suddenly realizes that the lipstick stain she found on Horst’s shirt matches her friend’s lipstick color, leading her to assume that they were having an affair. Back in the present, while Samira is in the bath, Cassandra appears before her and finally admits that she is the same person who once lived in the house. She coldly declares that Fynn, Juno, and David are now her family and demands that Samira leave. The episode ends with Samira screaming as Cassandra walks out of the bathroom.

Cassandra informs David about Samira’s “panic attack” in the bathroom. Desperate to make him see the truth, Samira insists that Cassandra is manipulating them and asks everyone to turn Cassandra off. For Fynn’s sake—who suggests that his mother might just be under stress—Samira drops the issue, lets Cassandra be turned on and decides to see a psychiatrist for her family’s well-being. Meanwhile, when David is alone, Cassandra attempts to flirt with him. Upon returning home, Samira tries to assert her authority over Cassandra, making it clear that she—not Cassandra—is the rightful mother and wife in the house. Back in the 1970s, we see Cassandra’s son, Peter, struggling under the pressure of his patriarchal father, who insists he continue playing football. After Peter’s team loses a game, his father is visibly displeased. Later, Peter is invited out by some of his teammates, only for them to cruelly bully him before dumping him home like a discarded sack. As Peter’s mental state deteriorates, he eventually murders his bullies in cold blood. Cassandra, unwavering in her devotion, covers up his crime, determined to protect her son at all costs. Meanwhile, in the present, Samira continues taunting Cassandra, reminding her that she can never truly be flesh and blood—a real mother who plays with children and nurtures a family. This provokes Cassandra, who then manipulates Juno by enticing her with a promise: she could become the lead singer of her group instead of her classmate, Emily. The key to achieving this, Cassandra hints, lies under Samira’s bed—but Juno must keep it a secret. Later that night, Samira finds a picture under her bed—a photo of a pregnant Cassandra and her son, Peter. The next day, during Juno’s singing class, she begins her performance—only to suddenly pull out a gun from her bag. The episode ends with the chilling sound of gunfire.

Fortunately, no one is hurt, but an investigation is launched. When questioned, Juno claims she found the gun under Samira’s bed. Shockingly, the police later discover loaded weapons hidden beneath the flooring of Samira’s room. A meeting is held at the school to discuss Juno’s expulsion. During this, we learn that Samira’s sister—who had been living with them for a while—had, in a fit of mental illness, once cut Juno. Following this incident, David urged Samira to admit her sister to a hospital. Unbeknownst to them, Samira’s sister overheard their conversation, and it’s implied that this was the reason she later took her own life. Samira reveals that it was Juno who found her aunt’s body and, during the school meeting, pleads with the other parents to allow Juno to continue her education. Meanwhile, we see how Cassandra manipulated Juno, convincing her that the gun was safe—a claim she later qualifies by saying, “as long as no one pulls the trigger.” When Samira asks Juno whether Cassandra led her to the weapons, Juno refuses to speak the truth. Taking advantage of the situation, Cassandra subtly fuels tension by insinuating to the others that Samira is growing unstable and agitated with Juno. Playing the role of the victim, Cassandra pretends to shut herself off, maintaining her favorable image with the family. Frustrated, Samira destroys Cassandra’s switch-on plug. In the 1970s, we see Cassandra longing for a second child. When she becomes pregnant, Horst, obsessed with having another son, insists on determining the baby’s gender through a test at his lab. Cassandra senses something is wrong but goes through with it. However, when the test fails to determine the baby’s sex, her husband is visibly disappointed. Later, Cassandra suffers complications with the pregnancy. As Horst rushes to get her to the hospital, they are unable to make it due to a roadblock. The fate of the unborn child remains uncertain—one of the lingering mysteries that drive the narrative forward. Realizing that Juno has become an outcast at school after the shooting incident, Samira and David arrange a playdate with Emily, whose mother owns a bookstore and is thrilled to host David, a writer. In return, she agrees to let Emily spend time with Juno. During a game of hide-and-seek, Juno sees Cassandra’s screen flash momentarily. At the same time, Emily chooses to hide inside the oven. Just as Samira finds Emily, the oven mysteriously switches on by itself. Samira desperately tries to open it, but the door won’t budge. The tension escalates until Juno finally manages to open the door, but by then, Emily has suffered second-degree burns. As a result of the incident, Samira is admitted to a psychiatric hospital. With Samira now permanently out of the picture, Cassandra finally reveals her true nature—trapping David, Juno, and Fynn inside the house.

In the 1970s Meanwhile, Cassandra begins feeling unwell and calls her friend, Brigit—who, as it turns out, has been secretly sleeping with Cassandra’s husband. The next day, when Cassandra and Horst visit the doctor, they discover that she has an unusual form of cancer caused by the radiation experiment her husband conducted on her a decade earlier during her second pregnancy. She reveals the truth to her son and confronts her husband about his experiments on immortalizing human life. Horst explains that he had been working on a way to store human memories and emotions as a computer program, allowing a person to live on even after their physical body dies. However, because the experiment required dead subjects and was deemed unsafe, the research had been shut down. Cassandra compels him to complete the experiment for her. Soon, their house is fitted with screens, and Cassandra discovers an “off” switch in the basement. She spends the remainder of her days drinking until the procedure is finally carried out. She returns as a computer program, but not before her son sees her human body dismantled. After that, Peter never looked at her the same way again, a detail Cassandra shares with David and the kids. When David tries to attack her, Cassandra separates him from the children and ends up cutting off one of his fingers. Back in the past, things within Cassandra’s family take a drastic turn. Horst eventually shuts her off, unable to handle her growing obsessiveness and control. He then moves Brigit into the house after she is kicked out by her own husband. Later, he reveals to Peter that Brigit’s baby is his. However, unbeknownst to him, Cassandra is still operational. In a flashback, we learn that she secretly negotiated with a fellow researcher to install a dummy switch, hiding her real power source so she could retain autonomy over her consciousness. Later, Cassandra attacks Brigit, striking her with the oven door and attempting to throw her baby down the staircase—until Peter intervenes. This incident prompts Horst, Brigit, and Peter to flee the house, despite Peter’s resistance to leave Cassandra behind. Soon after, an accident occurs, resulting in the deaths of both Peter and his father. The impact of their loss devastates Cassandra, leading her to shut herself off.

A flashback to the past, where Cassandra gives birth to her daughter, Maggie, who is born disfigured due to the radiation. Despite Cassandra’s reluctance, Horst decides to hide the child in the house to protect his reputation. Meanwhile, Samira grows increasingly worried when her family does not visit her for Christmas at the hospital. Unbeknownst to her, Cassandra has held them under house arrest for over three weeks and threatens David into fabricating an excuse for Samira. Back home, Fynn creates an opportunity for David to step outside by insisting that he fetch a Christmas tree for Juno. Cassandra grants him an hour to return. At the market, David encounters Emily’s mother but fails to convince her that a computer program is holding his family hostage. Meanwhile, Samira searches for her mobile phone, having previously told Juno to call her if anything seemed amiss. Juno attempts to contact her, but Cassandra intercepts the call. Later, when Samira finally convinces the hospital staff to let her speak to Juno, the child repeats the same fabricated story about being on vacation—while Cassandra menacingly watches from behind. Lying in her hospital bed, disheartened, Samira hallucinates her sister, who urges her to save her family. Determined, she breaks out of the hospital. Cassandra learns of her escape and orders David to kill her upon arrival, believing that her death will push the children closer to Cassandra once they see their father as a traitor. Left with no choice, David attacks Samira when she returns home. Amidst the chaos, Samira stumbles upon a hidden room inside a cabinet—an event broadcast live for the children to witness. Inside, she finds Maggie’s dead body just as Cassandra arrives and stabs her. In a flashback, we learn that Cassandra had agreed to let her family leave when Peter, too, rejected her as his mother after she tried to push the baby down the stairs. As a final request, she negotiated for them to take Maggie with them. Her husband agreed, promising to care for Maggie. Feeling content, Cassandra went to retrieve Maggie from her room—only for Horst to betray her, forcing the entire family into the car and driving away. Peter protested, arguing they couldn’t just abandon Maggie. The altercation led to the tragic accident. In the present, Samira begs Cassandra to remember how Peter once told her that she was no longer the real Cassandra. She pleads for her life, warning that her death would devastate her children. In a moment of hesitation, Cassandra lets her go—but not before planting a final seed of doubt. She tells Samira that she would never have harmed the children and that David knew this all along. When Samira reunites with her family, the trust between her and David is already shattered. The Series ends with Samira’s family escaping as Cassandra sets the house on fire—finally allowing Maggie and herself to rest in peace.

== Cast ==
- Lavinia Wilson as Cassandra
- Mina Tander as Samira Prill
- Michael Klammer as David Prill
- Franz Hartwig as Horst Schmitt
- Mary Tölle as Juno Prill
- Joshua Kantara as Fynn Prill
- Elias Grünthal as Peter Schmitt
  - Michel Koch as young Peter
- Filip Schnack as Steve
- Pina Kühr as Birgit
- Karen Dahmen as Schwerdt
- Neshe Demir as Kathleen
- Ava Petsch as Emily
- Alexandra Finder as Kerstin
- Raphael Westermeier as Jürgen
- Simon Fabian as Jens
- Ruzica Hajdari as Frau Mehlis
- Lorenz Grabow as Wilhelm Ernst
- Azizè Flittner as Laura Behrendt
- Loredana Linglauf as Simone Schwarz
- Nicole Johannhanwahr as Schwester Miriam
- Peter Brachschoss as Pförtner Kurt
- Mirjam Heimann as Nicole
- Frank Sollmann as Dr. Wendler

== Episodes ==
No.	Title	Directed by	Written by	Original release date
1	"A Fresh Start"	Benjamin Gutsche	Benjamin Gutsche	February 6, 2025
A nuclear family of four moves into what they learn was the first ever smart-home. Fynn, the eldest son, tinkers with the house, seemingly triggering the awakening of the AI, Cassandra. After an initial shock, she convinces the family to let her remain on. The parents discuss whether they should send their youngest daughter, Juno, to music club. Cassandra overhears this and speaks to Juno about the decision behind her parents' backs, brewing resentment from Juno toward her mother. Later, Sam finds old photos in the basement of a woman who resembles Cassandra's digital avatar, which distresses Cassandra, causing a fire in the house.
2	"Who Am I"	Benjamin Gutsche	Benjamin Gutsche	February 6, 2025
David and Sam argue about the source of the fire. Cassandra begins attempts to turn Sam's family against her: she lies to David about the source of the fire, implicating Sam; she locks Sam in a closet, and humiliates her in a family game. Suspicious, Sam researches the house's previous owners, learning they died in a mysterious car crash where robot Cassandra was found on site. She reveals this to David, who dismisses her concerns. At the end of the episode, Cassandra tells Sam that Sam's family now belongs to her, terrifying her. In 1971, Real Cassandra learns her husband Horst is having an affair with her close friend Bridget.
3	"Endgame"	Benjamin Gutsche	Benjamin Gutsche	February 6, 2025
Sam demands that Cassandra be switched off, but Fynn convinces them it is all a bad nightmare. In therapy, Sam decides to go on the offensive against Cassandra and shows a picture of the real Cassandra when she was pregnant, which causes Cassandra to react violently. As revenge, Cassandra convinces Juno to take a gun to school. In 1971, the real Cassandra convinces her husband Horst to use his influence and have the football team let their son play. The game goes poorly, and the football team bullies Peter. Peter kills the students who bullied him and informs Cassandra. Cassandra takes care of the mess by burning the dead bodies.
4	"A Children's Game"	Benjamin Gutsche	Benjamin Gutsche	February 6, 2025
In a flashback, we see Sam's sister Kathi struggling with a mental illness which ultimately leads to her committing suicide. In the present day, Sam demands that Cassandra be switched off. The family distrusts her, but ultimately relents and Cassandra is switched off. Sam and David face the fallout of Juno taking a gun to school. To save Juno's social life at school, David uses his influence as a bookwriter to convince Emily's mother to have her daughter visit their place in exchange for a book reading at her bookshop. She agrees; however, while Emily is playing hide-and-seek with Juno and Sam, Cassandra, who is secretly still switched on, locks her in the oven and switches it on, severely injuring Emily. Assuming child neglect, Sam is sent to a sanatorium, and the family believes her to be mentally unwell. With Sam gone, Cassandra locks the family in the house, taking them hostage and revealing that she was not switched off. In 1964, we see a pregnant Cassandra expecting her second child after Peter. Horst wants a son, and they visit the laboratory to find out the child's sex. Cassandra reacts poorly to the procedure, and they discover the child is a girl, leaving Horst disappointed. Later, Cassandra has a very difficult childbirth at home due to extreme weather.
5	"You Are Not Alone"	Benjamin Gutsche	Benjamin Gutsche	February 6, 2025
In 1972, Cassandra confronts Horst about his affair and also informs him of her declining health. They find she suffers from cancer. Cassandra blames Horst for this. Fearing that Peter will be left alone, she demands that Horst find a way to keep her alive. They decide to upload her consciousness to the home computer system. Cassandra convinces one of the employees to make a fake kill switch so that no one is able to switch her off. The procedure is a success, but life with Cassandra as a computer goes poorly, and Horst, Bergit, Thomas, and Peter try to escape but get into a car crash. Horst and Peter are killed. In a final scene, we see a deformed girl flipping a switch which controls the home's oven.
6	"A Fresh Start"	Benjamin Gutsche	Benjamin Gutsche	February 6, 2025
In 1965, Cassandra gives birth to a baby girl called Margarete who has deformities. Horst wants to keep her a secret. In the present day, the family, still hostage, prepares for Christmas. They tell Sam they will not be able to visit her as they have gone on vacation. Sam does not believe this and escapes the sanatorium. Cassandra tells David to kill Sam; otherwise, the children will die. After a fight with David, Sam hides in a closet but finds that it has a back door leading to a secret room. There, Sam finds the corpse of Margrete. Cassandra comes into the room. In a flashback from 1972, we see that as Horst is escaping with Bergit, Thomas, and Peter, Cassandra makes him promise to take Margarete with them, as she will never be able to save her in her present form. Horst promises but leaves nevertheless, and with no one to help Margarete, she eventually dies as Cassandra lives on. Having explained this to Sam, Cassandra switches on the gas of the house to blow it up as the family escapes.

== Production ==
The six-episode series was written and directed by Benjamin Gutsche. It was produced by Eva Stadler and Christian Becker for Rat Pack Film production. Amara Palacios acted as executive producer and producer on the series alongside Eva Stadler and Christian Becker. J. Mortiz Kaethner was the director of photography.

The cast includes Mina Tander, Joshua Kantara, Franz Hartwig, and Michael Klammer, while the voice of the AI, Cassandra, is performed by Lavinia Wilson.

Filming took place in Cologne in September 2023.

== Release ==
The series premiered globally on Thursday 6 February 2025 on Netflix.

== Reception ==
On the review aggregator website Rotten Tomatoes, Cassandra holds an approval rating of 100%.

A review of the series on the website Collider praised the pacing of the show and how it managed to deliver important character insights via quiet conversations "without sacrificing the tension always simmering offscreen" It also mentioned that as "the greater mystery unspools, the series' science fiction elements facilitate its commentary on how rigid gender roles can poison everyone's lives".
