= Brian Panowich =

American author

- Occupations: Writer, firefighter

Brian Panowich is an American author and journalist.

== Biography ==
Panowich grew up an "Army brat" in Europe before moving to East Georgia. Before becoming a writer he was a firefighter in Augusta, Georgia.

He is known for the novels Bull Mountain, Like Lions, and Hard Cash Valley.

Atlanta called Bull Mountain a brilliant debut novel. Panowich won the 2016 International Thriller Writers Award for Best First Novel and the Southern Book Prize for fiction. He is also a Los Angeles Times Book Prize finalist and the 2020 Georgia Author of the ear.

El País called his work about adventures in the mountains of Georgia "country noir". Il Giornale also wrote about his work. The HuffPost interviewed him in 2015.

In 2015 ITV Studios optioned Bull Mountain for adaptation into a TV series.

Panowich has four children.

== Bibliography ==
- Bull Mountain (2015)
- Like Lions (2019)
- Hard Cash Valley (2020)
- Nothing But the Bones (2024)
