= Give Us a Kiss =

1996 novel by Daniel Woodrell

- Author: Daniel Woodrell
- Genre: Country noir
- Published: 1996

Give Us a Kiss, originally titled Give Us a Kiss: A Country Noir, is a 1996 novel by Daniel Woodrell.

== Plot summary ==
Crime novelist Doyle Redmond leaves California and returns home to the Ozarks to find his missing brother Smoke.

== Reception ==
Woodrell is credited with coining the term "country noir" for the novel, although he later rejected the label for his writing. The book received mixed reviews from critics. Kirkus Reviews wrote that Woodrell added "a smart dose of writerly in-jokes and bottom-up social analysis to his usual mix of peckerwood poetry and butt-kicking violence." Publishers Weekly praised the humor but wrote that "there's little substance behind the nonstop jokes, a problem that grows more aggravating as the plot winds down into a series of stock action scenes followed by a predictable resolution."

In the Los Angeles Times, reviewer Richard Eder praised the book's use of Appalachian vernacular and setting, writing that "if Woodrell's hold on his characters and story is sometimes cloudy, their language asserts them - it asserts a place and a community as well."
