= Lavinia Wilson =

German actress (born 1980)

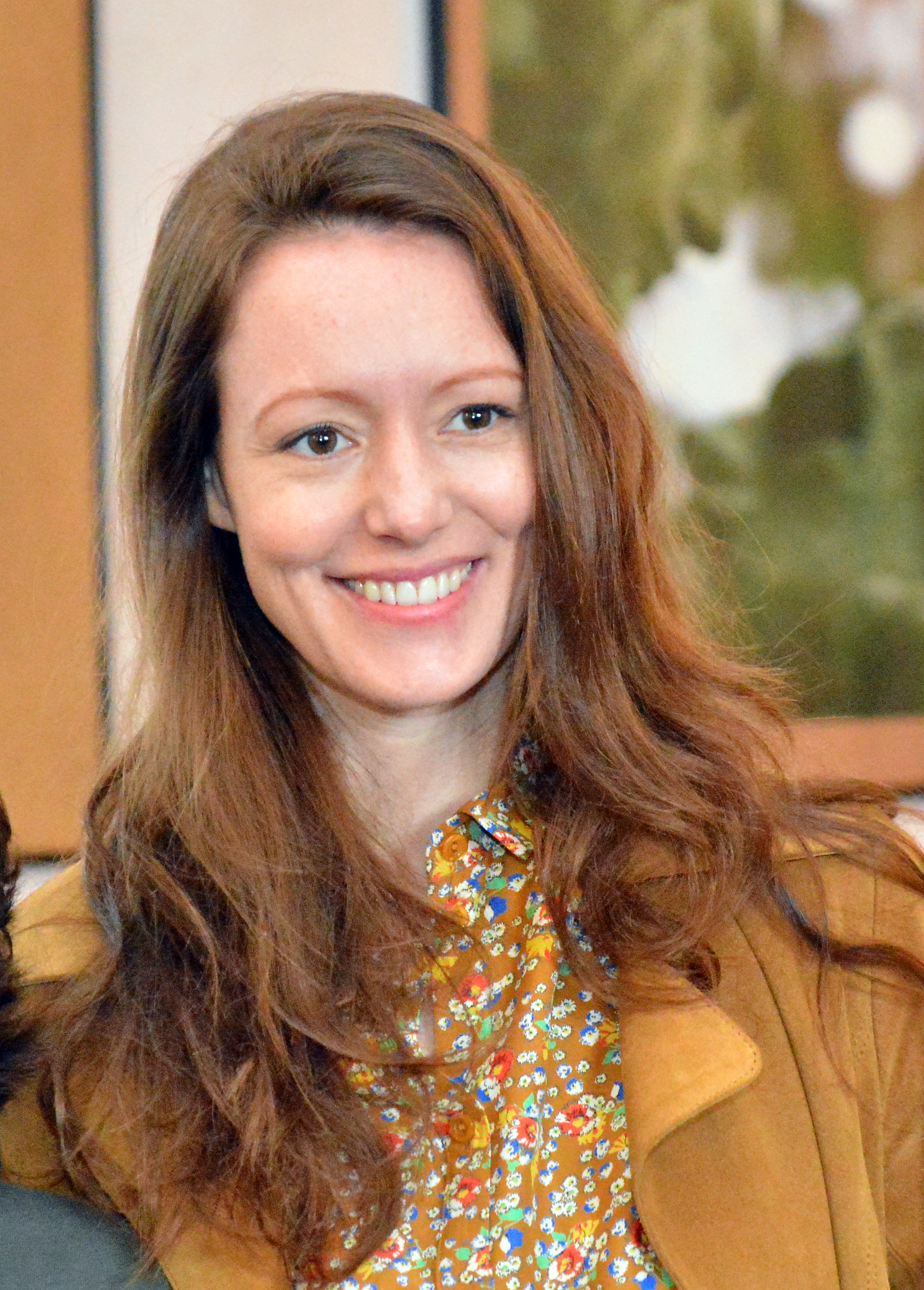
- Wilson in 2015
- Born: 8 March 1980 (age 46); Munich, Bavaria, West Germany
- Occupation: Actress
- Years active: 1992–present

Lavinia Wilson (born 8 March 1980) is a German actress. She has appeared in more than sixty films since 1992.

== Selected filmography ==
Year	Title	Role	Notes
1996	The First Time	Fili	TV film
2003	Gun-Shy	Isabella	
2004	Alone	Maria	
2005	Æon Flux	Sasha Prillo's Mother	
2006-2007	Die Familienanwältin	Katrin Winkelmann	TV series
2007	The Last Witness	Dr. Nadja Heron	TV series
2008	Tandoori Love	Sonja	
2009	Lulu and Jimi	Anne	
2010	2030 – Aufstand der Jungen	Sophie	
2013	Sources of Life		
2014	Wrecked	Elizabeth Kiehl	
2018	Deutschland 86	Brigitte Winkelmann	
2020	Deutschland 89	Brigitte Winkelmann	
2020	What We Wanted	Alice	
2025	Cassandra	Cassandra	TV Series
