= As If I Am Not There =

2010 film

- Irish film poster
- Directed by: Juanita Wilson
- Written by: Eliseo Altunaga
- Based on: As If I Am Not There by Slavenka Drakulić
- Produced by: James Flynn; Nathalie Lichtenthaeler; Karen Richards
- Starring: Stellan Skarsgård; Nataša Petrović
- Cinematography: Tim Fleming
- Edited by: Nathan Nugent
- Music by: Kiril Džajkovski
- Production companies: Euroimages Fund of the Council of Europe; Film i Väst; Octagon Films; Screen Ireland; Sektor Film Skopje; W2 Filmproduktion und Vertriebs; WMG Film; Wide Eye Films
- Distributed by: Corinth Films
- Release dates: 26 July 2010 (Bosnia and Herzegovina); 4 March 2011 (Ireland)
- Running time: 109 minutes
- Countries: Ireland; Serbia
- Language: Serbo-Croatian

As If I Am Not There (Serbian: Као да ме нема / Kao da me nema) is a 2010 Irish-Serbian drama film directed by Juanita Wilson. The film is set in the Balkans and is shot in the Serbo-Croatian language. It was selected as the Irish entry for the Best Foreign Language Film at the 84th Academy Awards, but did not make the final shortlist.

The film follows a young teacher who travels to a remote village. After the village is attacked, she is imprisoned and raped, together with the women of village. It is based on Slavenka Drakulić's 1999 novel of the same name that deals with war rape in the Bosnian War.

== Plot ==
Set during the Bosnian War, the movie follows the experiences of Samira, a young teacher from Sarajevo, who travels to a remote village to teach. Soon after arriving, the village is attacked by a group of soldiers. The men are killed and the women are placed in a makeshift brothel. There, the women are repeatedly raped and beaten. Stripped of all her possessions and constantly threatened with death, Samira decides to take a stand.

She puts on makeup, forbidden by her captors, as a form of defiance. Due to this act, a kind hearted Serbian army officer takes notice of Samira and protects her from the soldiers. She realizes that surviving means more than just simply staying alive.

== Cast ==
- Nataša Petrović as Samira
- Feđa Štukan as The Captain
- Jelena Jovanova as Jasmina
- Miraj Grbić as Commander
- Jasna Diklić
- Zvezda Angelovska
- Nikolina Kujača
- Sanja Burić
- Katina Ivanova
- Jana Stojanovska
- Nino Levi
- Irina Apelgren as Alisa
- Jana Mirčevska
- Stellan Skarsgård

== Reception ==
The film received positive reviews. Review aggregation website Rotten Tomatoes gives the film a score of 85% based on 13 reviews, with an average rating of 6.4/10.

== See also ==
- List of submissions to the 84th Academy Awards for Best Foreign Language Film
- List of Irish submissions for the Academy Award for Best Foreign Language Film
