= James Flynn (producer) =

Irish film and television producer (died 2023)

- Born: 21 August 1965
- Died: 11 February 2023 (aged 57)
- Occupation(s): Film and television producer
- Spouse: Juanita Wilson

James Flynn (21 August 1965 – 11 February 2023) was an Irish film and television producer. Flynn is best known for the various television and films he produced (including Vikings, The Last Duel, and The Banshees of Inisherin) and his nomination for Best Live Action Short Film at the 82nd Academy Awards for The Door. At that same Oscar ceremony, Cartoon Saloon's The Secret of Kells on which Flynn served as executive producer, was nominated for Best Animated Feature.

== Early life and education ==
James Flynn was born in 1965 in Kilmacud in County Dublin, Ireland.

He was educated at C.B.C. Monkstown. Following school, he attended University College Dublin, where he received a Bachelor of Commerce.

== Career ==
Flynn began his career at John Boorman's Merlin Films, before future Irish President Michael D. Higgins (then Minister for Arts) reestablished the Irish Film Board, where Flynn became a senior executive.

In 1997, he and filmmaker and future wife Juanita Wilson, set up Metropolitan Film Productions.

During his career, Flynn served as producer on The Tudors, Vikings, As If I Am Not There, Tomato Red, The Count of Monte Cristo, Disenchanted, The Last Duel, and The Banshees of Inisherin.

== Death and legacy ==
Flynn died on 11 February 2023 at the age of 57, following a short illness.

After his death, Flynn's contribution to the Irish film industry was praised by the Irish president, Michael D. Higgins.

Neil Jordan, who worked with him on films such as Ondine and Greta, praised his honesty, saying that he was "absolutely honourable in all his dealings".
