= Igor Ivanov Izi =

Macedonian film director and writer (born 1973)

Igor Ivanov
- Игор Иванов
- Born: 3 April 1973 (age 52); Skopje, SR Macedonia, SFR Yugoslavia
- Occupations: Director, writer

Igor "Izi" Ivanov (Macedonian: Игор "Изи" Иванов; born 3 April 1973) is a Macedonian film director and writer. He studied philosophy and began his film career in 1993, when he started directing series of films for television. Between 1995 and 2004 he made several documentaries and short films; one of them, the 15-minute-long Bugs (Bubački, 2004), competed at the 54th Berlinale and won Golden Leopard at the Locarno festival.

The title Upside Down, an adaptation of the novel Navel of the World by the contemporary Macedonian writer Venko Andonovski, is his feature film debut. The film clearly revives the poetic quality of the so-called "Black Wave" in Yugoslav film during the 1960s, which closely examined the afflictions of society's "other face" and the fatal dimensions of human existence. The world premiere of Upside Down was at Karlovy Vary Film Festival 2007 and it won Best Director award at Valencia Film Festival in Spain as well as the jury award at MOVEAST film festival in Pecs-Hungary. His latest project, the feature film "The Piano Room" was released in September 2013.

== Filmography ==
- 2013 THE PIANO ROOM (102min);
- 2007 UPSIDE DOWN (105min);
- 2004 BUBACHKI (15min);
- 2000 KAVAL (12min); GAJDA (9min);
- 1999-2003 NASE MAALO (TV Series);
- 1997 The CLOCK (8min);
- 1996 BLANKET OF ACO SHOPOV (14min);
- 1995 NEP (94min);
- 1993–1994 SUBWAY (TV series)
