= Benjamin Gutsche =

German screenwriter and director

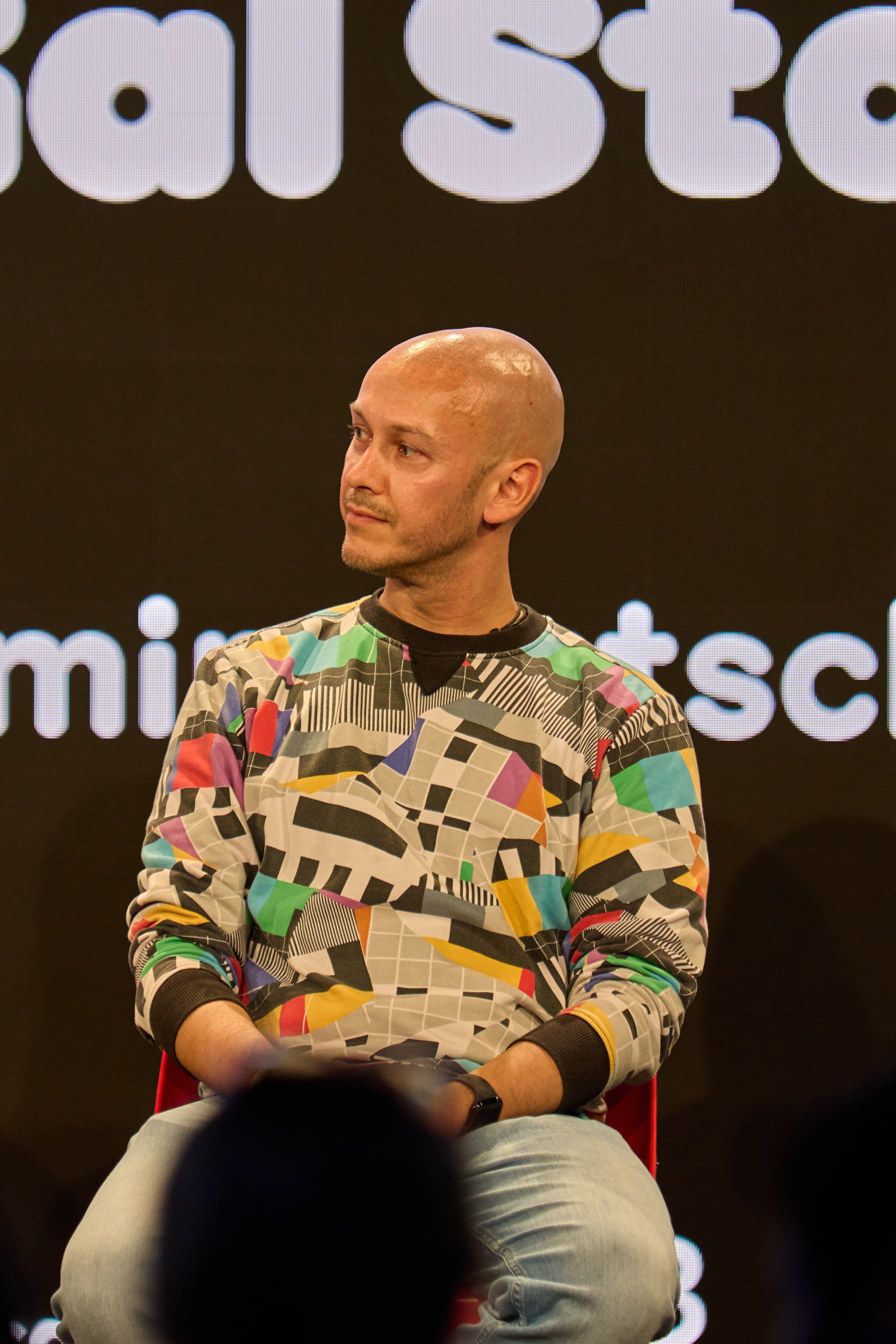
- Born: Benjamin Gutsche; 10 November 1985 (age 40); Luckenwalde, East Germany
- Occupations: Film director, screenwriter

Benjamin Gutsche (born 10 November 1985) is a German screenwriter and director.

== Life ==
Gutsche was born in Luckenwalde and granted with Abitur in 2005. After his Zivildienst in a retirement home he started becoming a screenwriter. Since then he lives in Berlin.

In addition to the series Arthur's Gesetz (Arthurs Law), in which he worked with Jan Josef Liefers and Nora Tschirner, among others, in 2018, Gutsche received widespread media attention with the ARD series All You Need, in which he also processed his own experiences from the queer community. The dramedy series, which is considered to be the first gay series on public television in Germany, was both written and directed by him and deals with topics such as online dating, fetish, prejudice and racism.

His science fiction series Cassandra was released on Netflix in February 2025. After first week the series reached position 1 in Netflix' world wide charts.

== Filmography ==
=== Series ===
- 2013: Lerchenberg
- 2015: Armans Geheimnis
- 2018: Arthurs Gesetz
- 2019–2022: All You Need (Season 1 & 2)
- 2023: Meme Girls
- 2025: Cassandra

=== Movies ===
- 2010: Der Antrag
- 2011: Tatort – Der Weg ins Paradies
- 2015: Als Mama schlief
- 2016: Zombriella
