= The Piano Room =

2013 Macedonian film by Igor Ivanov Izi]

- Film poster
- Directed by: Igor Ivanov Izi
- Starring: Nataša Petrović; Jovica Mihajlovski
- Release date: 15 September 2013
- Running time: 103 min
- Country: Republic of Macedonia
- Language: Macedonian

The Piano Room is a 2013 Macedonian drama film directed by Igor Ivanov Izi.

== Cast ==
- Nataša Petrović - Maid
- Jovica Mihajlovski - Manager
- Svetozar Cvetković - Dize
- Vasil Zafircev - Ira
- Torsten Voges - Victor
- Iva Krajnc - Eva
