= Juanita Wilson =

Irish director and writer from Dublin

Juanita Wilson is an Irish director and writer from Dublin. Her short film The Door received an Irish Film and Television Award (IFTA) in 2009 and an Academy Award nomination in 2010. Her debut feature film As If I Am Not There received the 2011 Irish Film and Television Award for best film, best script, and best director.

== Early life ==
Wilson attended the National College of Art and Design where she studied fine art as well as Dublin Institute of Technology where she studied design and journalism. She began directing after this.

== Career ==
In 1997, she and her future husband James Flynn, set up Metropolitan Film Productions. She produced the films Inside I'm Dancing and H3.

=== The Door ===
The Door was Wilson's first short film. It is based on the " Monologue About a Whole Life Written Down on Doors, the testimony of Nikolai Fomich Kalugin" by Svetlana Alexievich (from her book Voices from Chernobyl). The Irish Film Board provided money for the making of the film. She went to the Ukrainian cities Kyiv and Prypiat, described as "the most radioactive place on earth" due to its close proximity to Chernobyl, to film it. She was inspired to go there after seeing an abandoned playground with a Ferris wheel on the Internet. The setting of The Door is in Ukraine. It utilises the Russian language complemented by English language subtitles. The Door won in the Short Film category at the 6th Irish Film and Television Awards in 2009. The Door was nominated in the category of Academy Award for Best Live Action Short Film at the 82nd Academy Awards. The Door also won awards at film festivals held in Bilbao, Cork and Foyle. It also won "best director" at the Polish Grand OFF 2009 as well as winning the Sarajevo Film Festival's Katrin Cartlidge Bursary 2009.

=== As If I'm Not There ===
Wilson's first feature film, titled As If I'm Not There, based upon the book by Slavenka Drakulić, was released in 2010. The film was a joint Irish production alongside Macedonia and Sweden. It was being filmed in Macedonia. The film was screened at the 35th Toronto International Film Festival. The film was selected as the Irish entry for the Best Foreign Language Film at the 84th Academy Awards, but it did not make the final shortlist.
