= Cullen Moss =

American actor (born 1975)

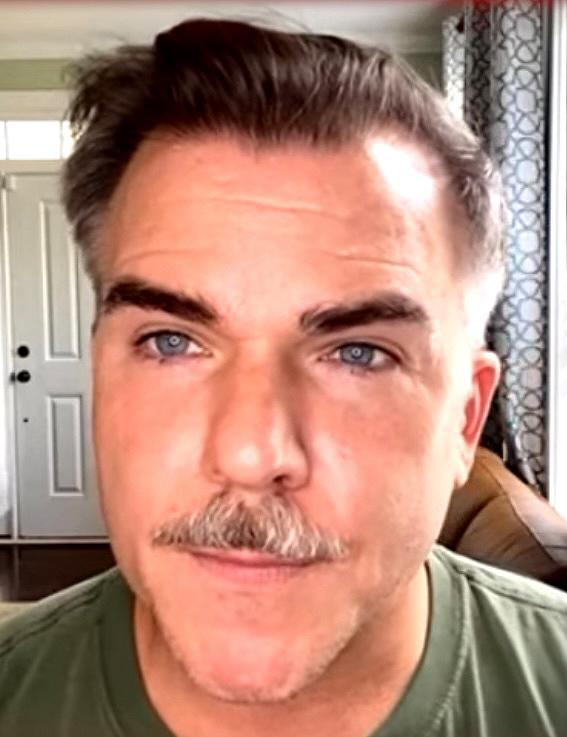
- Moss in 2022
- Born: July 8, 1975 (age 51); Buffalo, New York, U.S.
- Occupation: Actor
- Years active: 1996–present

Cullen Moss (born July 8, 1975) is an American actor. He is known for his roles on Outer Banks (2020–present), One Tree Hill (2003–2012), and The Notebook (2004).

== Early life ==
Moss is a native of Winston-Salem, North Carolina, who graduated from Mount Tabor High School in 1993.

== Career ==
Moss has portrayed a variety of supporting roles in numerous productions; his most notable television roles are Junk on One Tree Hill, Officer Gorman on The Walking Dead, and Joey on Resurrection.

Moss's film work includes The Notebook, Dear John, The Conspirator, and Times Like Dying.

Moss has provided the English-version voice for a few Japanese anime such as You're Under Arrest and its motion picture version.

Moss will appear in the upcoming Netflix limited series adaptation All the Sinners Bleed, based on the S. A. Cosby novel of the same name.

== Filmography ==
=== Film ===
Year	Title	Role	Notes	Ref.
1999	You're Under Arrest: The Movie	Shouji Tokairen	English version; voice	
2003	Ball of Wax	Ricky Sparks		
2004	The Notebook	Bodee		
2005	The Last Confederate: The Story of Robert Adams	Prison guard #2		
2005	The Pigs	Damon		
2006	Find Love	Cousin		
2006	Four the Roses	Officer Cop		
2007	Southern Gothic	Tobias		
2007	Dead Heist	Deputy		
2008	The 27 Club	Elliot's lawyer		
2008	The Secret Life of Bees	Young White Policeman		
2009	The Marc Pease Experience	Young Father		
2010	Dear John	Rooster		
2010	Blood Done Sign My Name	Larry Teel		
2010	The Conspirator	Stanton's Officer		
2011	to.get.her	Paul		
2011	Seeking Justice	Jones		
2011	Breaking Waves	Dan		
2012	The Odd Life of Timothy Green	Cop		
2013	Identity Thief	Boyfriend 'The Ville'	Uncredited	
2013	Safe Haven	Police Officer Bass		
2013	42	Waiting Reporter	Uncredited	
2013	Iron Man 3	Extremis Candidate		
2013	The Heroes of Arvine Place	Kevin Hedges		
2013	Don't Know Yet	Big Deal		
2014	The Remaining	Survivor-Bridge		
2014	99 Homes	Bill		
2014	Toonstone	Wild Harry Johnson		
2015	Well Wishes	Jack		
2016	The Birth of a Nation	Man		
2016	Keeping Up with the Joneses	Guard #1		
2016	Hidden Figures	Mission Control Commander		
2017	The Shadow Effect	Governor Francis		
2018	Arizona	Burt	Uncredited	
2018	Assassination Nation	Mayor Bartlett		
2019	The Highwaymen	Oklahoma Cop		
2019	Chameleon	Parole Board Supervisor	Voice	
2020	One of These Days	Chris		
2020	The Immortal Jellyfish	The Officer		
2021	Faceless	Spandex Face Man		
2024	Brooklyn, Minnesota	Scotty		
2026	Gaia	Rich		
2026	American Summer †	Eddie		

=== Television ===
Key
†	Denotes television productions that have not yet been released

Year	Title	Role	Notes	Ref.
1996	You're Under Arrest	Tokairin	Episode: "File 1: Soshitefutariha deatta"	
1997	You're Under Arrest: Mini Specials	Tokairin	English version; voice	
1998	Blue Submarine No. 6	Alexender David Cekeros	Miniseries	
2003	Dawson's Creek	Fellow Counselor	Episode: "Lovelines"	
2003–2012	One Tree Hill	Junk	42 episodes	
2006	Surface	Paramedic #1	Episode #1.11	
2010	Hollywood East	Howard	Episode: "Hungover & Out"	
2010	Army Wives	Sgt. Danny Farina	Episode: "Be All You Can Be"	
2011	Teen Spirit	Faline	Television film	
2012	Outlaw Country	Rafe Porter	Television film	
2012	Doraleous & Associates	Lord Yahtzee	Episode: "Hero Punctuation"	
2013	Eastbound & Down	Mark	2 episodes	
2014	Turn: Washington's Spies	Bailey / Continental #1	2 episodes	
2014	Reckless	Carter Davidson	Episode: "Deep Waters"	
2014	Constantine	Owen	Episode: "The Darkness Beneath"	
2014	The Walking Dead	Officer Gorman	Episode: "Slabtown"	
2014–2015	Resurrection	Joey	5 episodes	
2015	Secrets and Lies	Uniform #5	Episode: "The Lie"	
2015	Sleepy Hollow	I.C.E. Officer	Episode: "I, Witness"	
2016	Mercy Street	Captain Saunders	2 episodes	
2016	Vice Principals	Mr. Chrysler	Episode: "Gin"	
2016	Rectify	Rusty Pell	Episode: "All I'm Sayin'"	
2017	Underground	Jack	2 episodes	
2017	Shots Fired	Brock	3 episodes	
2018	Hap and Leonard	Tim Garner	5 episodes	
2018	Bobcat Goldthwait's Misfits & Monsters	Dubbing Actor	Episode: "Bubba the Bear"	
2018	Queen Sugar	Colton Landry	2 episodes	
2019	True Detective	State Trooper	2 episodes	
2019	Step Up: High Water	Gus	Episode: "Splits"	
2019	Broker	Gary	Television film	
2019	Dolly Parton's Heartstrings	Hackmeyer	Episode: "Down from Dover"	
2019–2022	The Righteous Gemstones	Brock	4 episodes	
2020–2023	Your Honor	Det. Rudy Cunningham	8 episodes	
2020–2026	Outer Banks	Deputy Vic Shoupe	38 episodes	
2021	The Underground Railroad	Judge Smith	Miniseries; 2 episodes	
2022	Women of the Movement	Deputy John Cothran	Miniseries; 2 episodes	
2022	Killing It	Donald Assarian	Episode: "Pilot"	
2022	The Staircase	Jim Hardin	Miniseries; 5 episodes	
2022	Black Bird	Russ Aborn	Miniseries; 2 episodes	
2025	The Runarounds	Tony	Episode: "Kill Devil"	
TBA	All the Sinners Bleed †	Deputy Roger Simmons	Limited series	

== Awards and nominations ==
Year	Award	Category	Work	Result	Ref.
2013	Williamsburg International Film Festival	Best Actor	The Heroes of Arvine Place	Won	
2016	Beaufort International Film Festival	Best Actor	The Visitor	Nominated	
