= Giancarlo Esposito =

American actor (born 1958)

- Esposito in 2026
- Born: Giancarlo Giuseppe Alessandro Esposito; April 26, 1958 (age 68); Copenhagen, Denmark
- Citizenship: US; Italy
- Education: Elizabeth Seton College
- Occupation: Actor
- Years active: 1968–present
- Spouse: Joy McManigal (divorced)
- Children: 4

Giancarlo Giuseppe Alessandro Esposito (Italian: [dʒaŋˈkarlo dʒuˈzɛppe alesˈsandro eˈspɔːzito]; born April 26, 1958) is an American actor. He is best known for his portrayal of Gus Fring in the AMC crime drama series Breaking Bad (2009–2011), a role he reprised in the spin-off Better Call Saul (2017–2022). For this role, Esposito won the Critics' Choice Television Award for Best Supporting Actor in a Drama Series twice and earned three nominations for the Primetime Emmy Award for Outstanding Supporting Actor in a Drama Series.

His other television roles include federal agent Mike Giardello in the NBC series Homicide: Life on the Street (1998–1999), Sidney Glass / Magic Mirror in the ABC fantasy series Once Upon a Time (2011–2017), Tom Neville in the NBC series Revolution (2012–2014), Dr. Edward Ruskins in the Netflix series Dear White People (2017–2021), Stan Edgar in the Amazon series The Boys (2019–2026), Moff Gideon in the Disney+ series The Mandalorian (2019–2023), which earned him two Primetime Emmy Award nominations, Adam Clayton Powell Jr. in the MGM+ series Godfather of Harlem (2019–2023), and Stanley Johnston in the Netflix series The Gentlemen (2024–present).

In film, he collaborated with Spike Lee, acting in several of his films; School Daze (1988), Do the Right Thing (1989), Mo' Better Blues (1990), Jungle Fever (1991) and Malcolm X (1992). His other major films include Taps (1981), King of New York (1990), Bob Roberts (1992), Fresh (1994), The Usual Suspects (1995), Ali (2001), Monkeybone (2001), Last Holiday (2006), Rabbit Hole (2010), Maze Runner: The Scorch Trials (2015) and its sequel Maze Runner: The Death Cure (2018), The Jungle Book (2016) Okja (2017), Megalopolis (2024), and Captain America: Brave New World (2025).

== Early life and education ==
Giancarlo Giuseppe Alessandro Esposito was born in Copenhagen, Denmark. He is the son of Giovanni "John" C. Esposito (1931–2002), an Italian stagehand and carpenter from Naples, and Elizabeth "Leesa" Foster (1926–2017), an African-American opera and nightclub singer from Alabama.

Esposito lived in Rome, Italy, until he was five, when his family moved to the United States, settling in Manhattan, New York City. He grew up in Manhattan Plaza in Hell's Kitchen. He attended Elizabeth Seton College in New York and earned a two-year degree in radio and television communications.

== Career ==
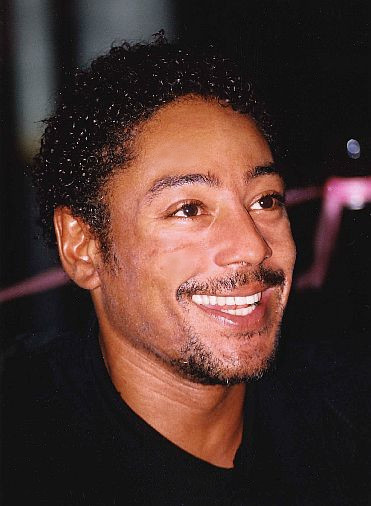
Esposito in 1998

Esposito made his Broadway debut in 1968, playing a child opposite Shirley Jones in the short-lived musical Maggie Flynn (1968), set during the 1863 New York City draft riots. He was among the singers of The Electric Company original theme song and later appeared as Big Bird's camp counselor on Sesame Street. He was also a member of the youthful cast of the Stephen Sondheim–Harold Prince collaboration Merrily We Roll Along, which closed with 16 performances and 56 previews in 1981.

During the 1980s, Esposito appeared in films such as Maximum Overdrive, King of New York, and Trading Places. He also performed in TV shows such as Miami Vice and Spenser: For Hire. He played J. C. Pierce, a cadet in the 1981 movie Taps.

In 1988, he landed his breakout role as the leader ("Dean Big Brother Almighty") of the black fraternity "Gamma Phi Gamma" in director Spike Lee's film School Daze, exploring color relations at black colleges. Over the next four years, Esposito and Lee collaborated on three other movies: Do the Right Thing, Mo' Better Blues, and Malcolm X. During the 1990s, Esposito appeared in the acclaimed indie films Night on Earth, Fresh and Smoke, as well as its sequel Blue in the Face. He also appeared in the mainstream films Harley Davidson and the Marlboro Man with Mickey Rourke, Reckless with Mia Farrow, and Waiting to Exhale starring Whitney Houston and Angela Bassett. In 1996, Esposito was featured in a music video "California" by French superstar Mylène Farmer, directed by Abel Ferrara.

Esposito played FBI agent Mike Giardello on the TV crime drama Homicide: Life on the Street. That role drew from both his African American and Italian ancestry. He played this character during the show's seventh and final season, and reprised the role for its 2000 made-for-TV movie. He had another multiracial role as Sergeant Paul Gigante in the television comedy, Bakersfield P.D.

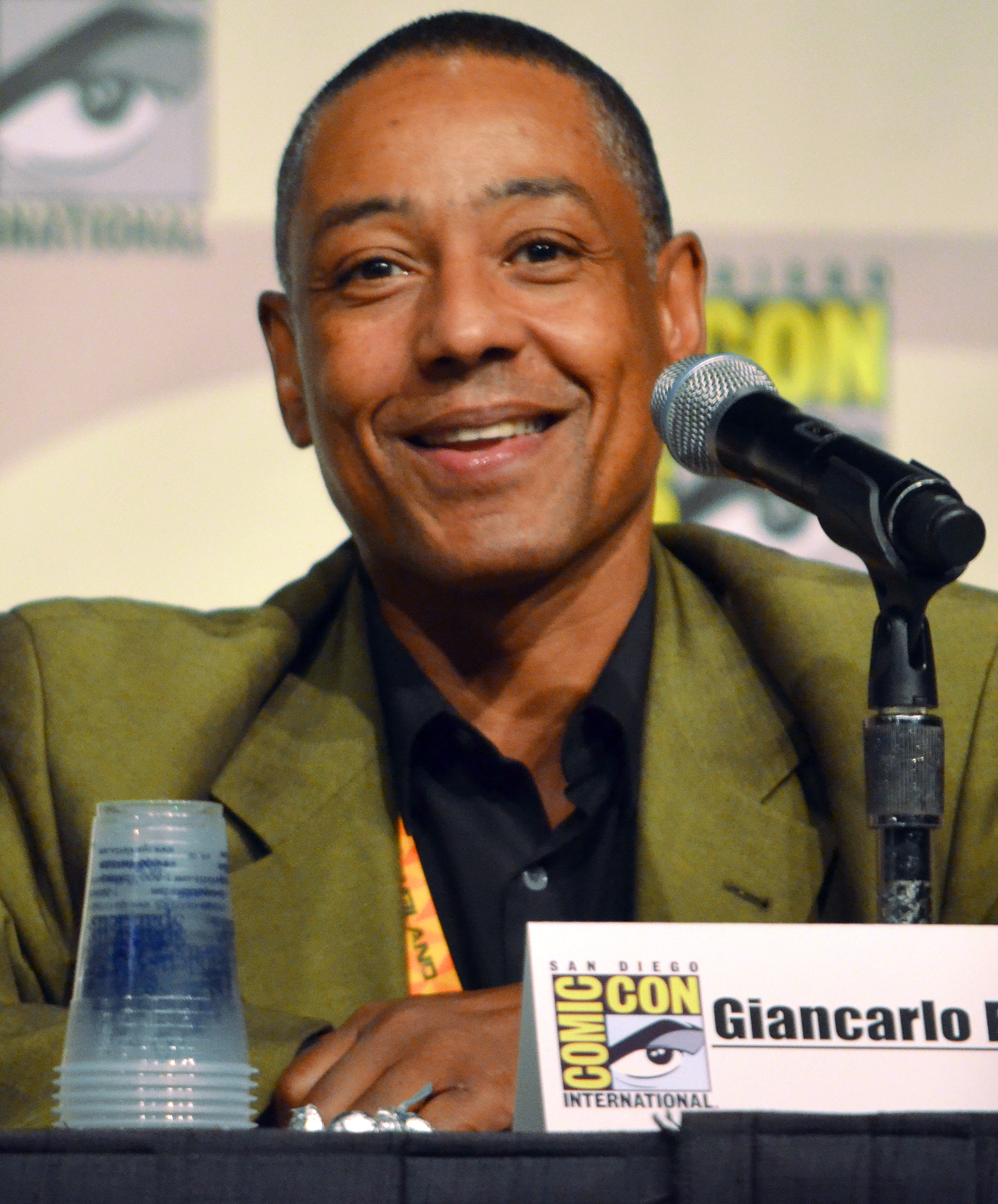
Esposito in 2012

In 1997, Esposito played the film roles of Darryl in Trouble on the Corner and Charlie Dunt in Nothing to Lose. Other TV credits include NYPD Blue, Law & Order, The Practice, New York Undercover, and Fallen Angels: Fearless.

Esposito has portrayed drug dealers (Fresh, Breaking Bad, King of New York, Better Call Saul, The Gentlemen), policemen (The Usual Suspects, Derailed), political radicals (Bob Roberts, Do the Right Thing), and a demonic version of the Greek god of sleep Hypnos from another dimension (Monkeybone). In 2001, he played Cassius Marcellus Clay Sr. in Ali, and Miguel Algarín, friend and collaborator of Nuyorican poet Miguel Piñero, in Piñero.

In 2002, Esposito was cast as a legal eagle in the David E. Kelley television drama Girls Club. Although the series only lasted one season, and did not garner generally positive reviews, it represented a personal turning point for Esposito, who relayed to The Washington Post: "I started to play bosses. And I realized, 'Oh, okay, this is an opportunity.' It was really a great opening for me to show who I really was. And it's kept going like that."

In 2005, Esposito played an unsympathetic detective named Esposito in the film Hate Crime, which centers upon homophobia as a theme.

In 2006, Esposito starred in Last Holiday as Senator Dillings, alongside Queen Latifah and Timothy Hutton. Esposito played Robert Fuentes, a Miami businessman with shady connections, on the UPN television series South Beach. He appeared in New Amsterdam and CSI: Miami. In Feel the Noise (2007), he played ex-musician Roberto, the Puerto Rican father of Omarion Grandberry's character, aspiring rap star "Rob". In 2008, he made his directorial debut with Gospel Hill, serving also as producer and star of the film.

New York theater credits for Esposito include The Me Nobody Knows, Lost in the Stars, Seesaw, and Merrily We Roll Along. In 2008, he appeared on Broadway as Gooper in an African American production of Tennessee Williams' Pulitzer Prize-winning drama Cat on a Hot Tin Roof, directed by Debbie Allen and starring James Earl Jones, Phylicia Rashad, Anika Noni Rose, and Terrence Howard.

From 2009 to 2011, Esposito appeared in seasons 2 through 4 of the AMC drama Breaking Bad, as Gus Fring, the head of a New Mexico-based methamphetamine drug ring. In the fourth season, he was the show's primary antagonist, and won critical acclaim for this role. He won the Best Supporting Actor in a Drama award at the 2012 Critics' Choice Television Awards and was nominated for an Outstanding Supporting Actor in a Drama Series award at the 2012 Primetime Emmy Awards, but lost to co-star Aaron Paul.

Esposito appeared in the film Rabbit Hole (2010). He also appeared in the first season of the ABC program Once Upon a Time, which debuted in October 2011. He portrayed the split role of Sidney Glass, a reporter for The Daily Mirror in the town of Storybrooke, Maine, who is really a genie trapped in the Magic Mirror, possessed by The Evil Queen in a parallel fairy tale world. Esposito would periodically reprise the role in later seasons as a guest star. Esposito appeared in Revolution as Major Tom Neville, a central character who kills Ben Matheson in the pilot. He escorts a captured Danny to the capital Philadelphia of the Monroe Republic.

Esposito also appeared in Community as a guest star for the episode titled "Digital Estate Planning". He performed again in the fourth season, in the episode titled "Paranormal Parentage". Esposito has additionally appeared in a video of the action role-playing sci-fi first-person shooter game Destiny. Esposito voices antagonist Faraday in the Netflix anime series Cyberpunk: Edgerunners (2022). Esposito also voices Antón Castillo, the main antagonist of the video game Far Cry 6, who was modeled after Esposito's appearance. He was also included in the videogame Payday 2, as the supporting character, then antagonist "The Dentist".

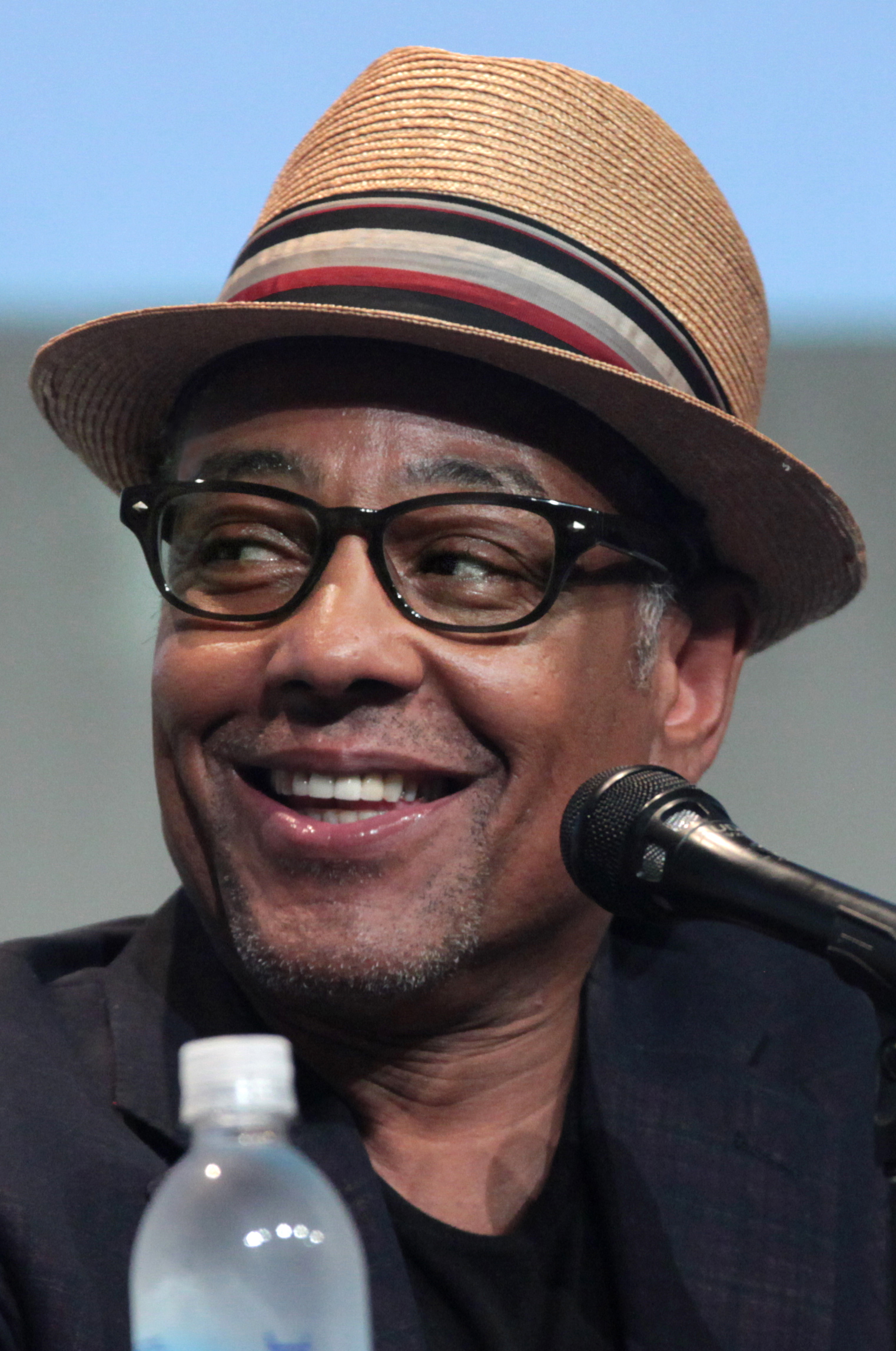
Esposito at the 2015 San Diego Comic-Con

He has joined the DC Universe Animated Original Movies series. He played Ra's al Ghul in Son of Batman and Eric Needham / Black Spider in Batman: Assault on Arkham. He also had a recurring role in the first season of The Get Down on Netflix. In 2017, Esposito reprised his role as Gus Fring in the Breaking Bad prequel series, Better Call Saul. In 2019, he appeared in the first-season finale of The Boys as Stan Edgar, and reprised the role in the second and third season.

In 2016, Esposito voiced Akela in the film The Jungle Book, which was directed by Jon Favreau. Esposito and Favreau would work together once again in the Disney+ series The Mandalorian in which Esposito appears in a starring role, while Favreau acts as an executive producer for the series and as its writer. He plays the role of New York congressman Adam Clayton Powell Jr. in the 2019 Epix series Godfather of Harlem.

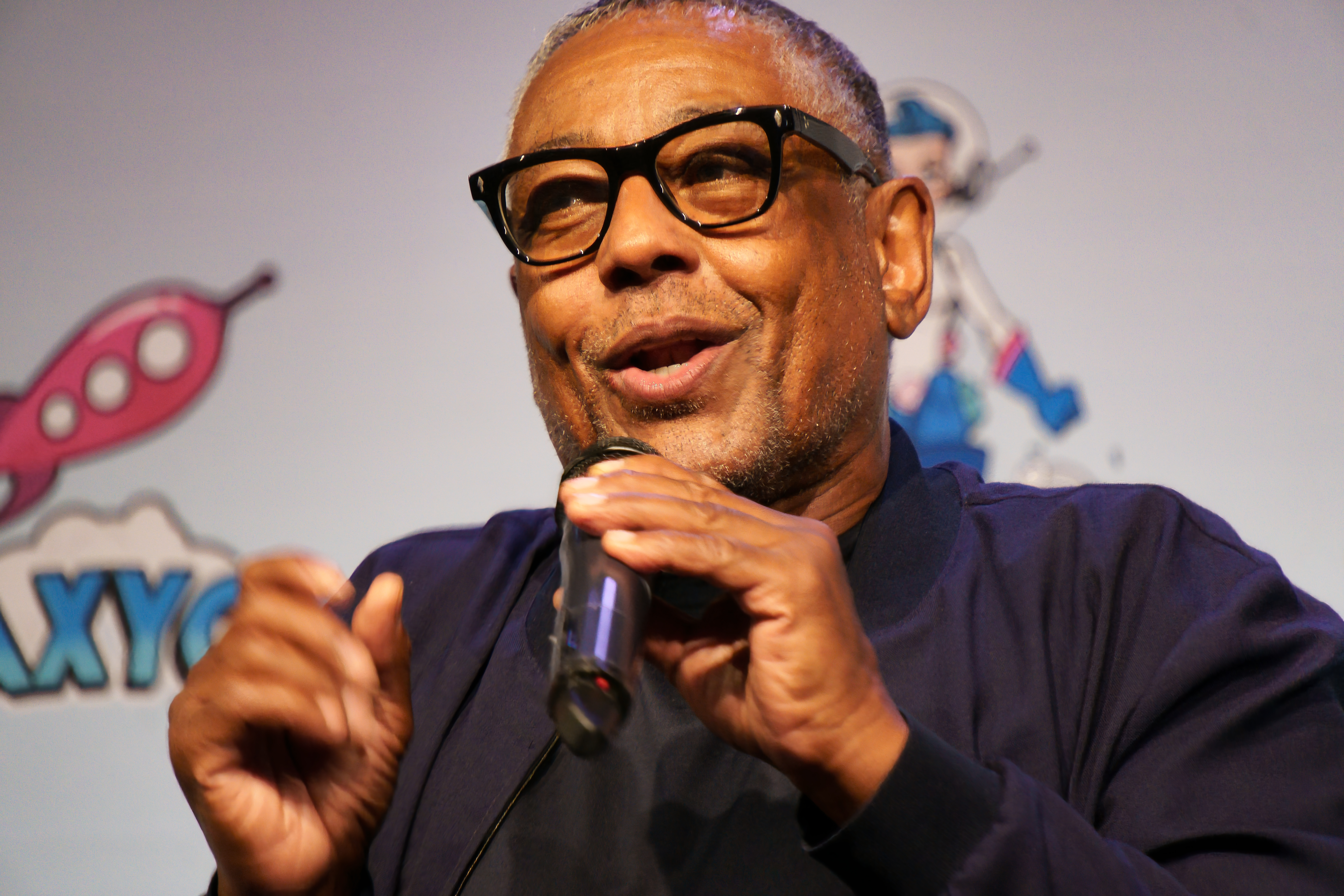
Esposito at GalaxyCon Raleigh 2023

In July 2020, Esposito began teasing his role in "a huge video game". His role was later revealed as the main antagonist of Ubisoft's Far Cry 6, in which he would portray and voice Antón Castillo, the dictatorial ruler of the fictional Caribbean island country of Yara.

In 2022, Esposito played Taxi Driver in Euphoria, a film installation by Julian Rosefeldt.

In 2024, he launched his first graphic novel, The Venetian.

In December 2024, Esposito was announced as a cast member in independent drama Out Come the Wolves, based on the Rancid 1995 album of the same name.

In February 2025, Esposito appeared as Seth Voelker / Sidewinder of the Serpent Society in the Marvel Cinematic Universe (MCU) film Captain America: Brave New World. Esposito was added to the film's reshoots.

Esposito will appear in the upcoming Netflix limited series adaptation All the Sinners Bleed, based on the S. A. Cosby novel of the same name.

== Personal life ==
Esposito was married to Joy McManigal, with whom he has four daughters. Around the time of their divorce in the late 2000s, Esposito filed for bankruptcy and lost his home. Prior to being cast in Breaking Bad, he was in such severe financial distress that he contemplated arranging his own murder to provide life insurance money for his children.

Esposito was raised Catholic and considered becoming a priest. In June 2026, following his work on the film 7 Dogs, regional media and Saudi officials reported that Esposito had embraced Islam and recited the Shahada, after video surfaced of him performing salah at a mosque in Morocco. When asked about the experience while promoting the film, Esposito expressed profound appreciation for Islamic faith and devotion, remarking that "there is one God, one Allah."

== Acting credits ==
Key
†	Denotes films that have not yet been released

=== Film ===
Giancarlo Esposito film credits
Year	Title	Role	Notes	Ref.
1979	Running	Puerto Rican teenager		
1980	The Changeling	Extra		
1981	Taps	Cadet Captain JC Pierce		
1983	Trading Places	Cellmate #2		
1984	The Brother from Another Planet	Man getting arrested		
1984	The Cotton Club	Bumpy Hood		
1984	Go Tell It on the Mountain	Elisha		
1985	Desperately Seeking Susan	Street vendor		
1986	Maximum Overdrive	Videoplayer		
1987	Sweet Lorraine	Howie		
1988	School Daze	Julian		
1989	Do the Right Thing	Buggin' Out		
1990	King of New York	Lance		
1990	Mo' Better Blues	Left Hand Lacey		
1991	Harley Davidson and the Marlboro Man	Jimmy Jiles		
1991	Night on Earth	YoYo		
1991	Jungle Fever	Homeless Man		
1992	Bob Roberts	John Alijah "Bugs" Raplin		
1992	Malcolm X	Thomas Hagan		
1993	Amos & Andrew	Reverend Fenton Brunch		
1993	Seven Songs for Malcolm X	Autobiography reading	Voice; documentary	
1994	Fresh	Esteban		
1995	The Usual Suspects	Jack Baer		
1995	Smoke	OTB Man #1 / Tommy Finelli		
1995	Blue in the Face	Tommy Finelli		
1995	Reckless	Tim Timko		
1995	Waiting to Exhale	David Matthews		
1997	Nothing to Lose	Charlie Dunt		
1997	Loose Women	Stylist #2		
1997	Trouble on the Corner	Darryl		
1997	Big City Blues	Georgie		
1998	Twilight	Reuben Escobar		
1998	Phoenix	Louie		
1998	Where's Marlowe?	Blind Man		
2001	Josephine	Spike		
2001	Monkeybone	Hypnos		
2001	Piñero	Miguel Algarín		
2001	Ali	Cassius Marcellus Clay Sr.		
2003	Ash Tuesday	Karl		
2003	Blind Horizon	JC Reynolds		
2004	Doing Hard Time	Captain Pierce	Direct-to-video	
2004	A Killer Within	Vargas		
2005	Hate Crime	Detective Esposito		
2005	Chupacabra: Dark Seas	Dr. Peña	Direct-to-video	
2005	Back in the Day	Benson Copper		
2005	Carlito's Way: Rise to Power	Little Jeff	Direct-to-video	
2005	Derailed	Detective Franklin Church		
2006	Last Holiday	Senator Dillings		
2006	Sherrybaby	Parole Officer Hernandez		
2006	Rain	Ken Arnold		
2007	The Box	Detective Dwayne Burkhalter		
2007	Feel the Noise	Roberto		
2008	Gospel Hill	Dr. Palmer	Also director and producer	
2010	Rabbit Hole	Auggie		
2011	S.W.A.T.: Firefight	Inspector Hollander	Direct-to-video	
2011	Certainty	Father Heery		
2012	Alex Cross	Daramus Holiday		
2014	Son of Batman	Ra's al Ghul	Voice	
2014	Batman: Assault on Arkham	Eric Needham / Black Spider	Voice	
2014	Poker Night	Bernard		
2015	Maze Runner: The Scorch Trials	Jorge		
2015	The Long Home	William Tell Oliver	Unreleased	
2016	The Pills – Sempre meglio che lavorare	Bangla Boss		
2016	The Jungle Book	Akela	Voice	
2016	Money Monster	Captain Marcus Powell		
2016	Brother Nature	Congressman Frank McClaren		
2017	The Show	Mason Washington	Also director and producer	
2017	Stuck	Lloyd	Also associate producer	
2017	Okja	Frank Dawson		
2017	Mutafukaz	Mr. K	Voice; English dub	
2018	Maze Runner: The Death Cure	Jorge		
2019	Coda	Paul		
2019	Line of Duty	Tom Volk		
2020	Stargirl	Archie Brubaker		
2020	Unpregnant	Bob		
2022	Beauty	Beauty's Father		
2023	Teenage Mutant Ninja Turtles: Mutant Mayhem	Baxter Stockman	Voice	
2024	Abigail	Lambert		
2024	Megalopolis	Frank Cicero		
2024	MaXXXine	Teddy Knight		
2024	Please Don't Feed the Children	Fitz		
2025	Captain America: Brave New World	Seth Voelker / Sidewinder		
2025	The Electric State	Colonel Marshall Bradbury		
2026	The Only Living Pickpocket in New York	Detective Allan Warren		
2026	Kill Me	Dr. Singer		
2026	7 Dogs	Roman Marks		
2026	By Any Means	Vernon Dahmer		
2026	Your Mother Your Mother Your Mother	Abdul Malik		
2026	The Cat in the Hat	Mr. Hoogeboom	Voice	
2027	Karoshi †	TBA	Post-production	
TBA	The Prince †	TBA	Post-production	
TBA	And Out Comes the Wolf †	TBA	Post-production	
TBA	Weird Party †	TBA	Post-production	

=== Television ===
Giancarlo Esposito television credits
Year	Title	Role	Notes	Ref.
1981	The Gentleman Bandit	Jamie	Television film	
1982	Another World	Willie Armstrong	Episode: "Episode #1.4498"	
1982–1983	Guiding Light	Clay Tynan	Regular cast	
1982–1984	Sesame Street	Mickey	7 episodes	
1984–1985	Miami Vice	Luther / Ricky / Adonis Jackson	3 episodes	
1985	CBS Schoolbreak Special	Kyle	Episode: "The Exchange Student"	
1985	Finnegan Begin Again	Intruder	Television film	
1985–1986	American Playhouse	Elisha / Simon Fernandes	2 episodes	
1986	Rockabye	Marcus	Television film	
1986	The Equalizer	Jumpin' Jack	Episode: "The Line"	
1987	Spenser: For Hire	Ramos	Episode: "On the Night He Was Betrayed"	
1987	Leg Work	Tyson	Episode: "Blind Trust"	
1990	Lifestories	Julio	Episode: "Jerry Forchette"	
1993	Relentless: Mind of a Killer	Arthur Sistrunk	Television film	
1993	The American Experience	Dr. Kenneth Clark	Episode: "Simple Justice"	
1993–1994	Bakersfield P.D.	Detective Paul Gigante	17 episodes	
1995	New York Undercover	Adolfo Guzman	3 episodes	
1995	Fallen Angels	Paris Minton	Episode: "Fearless"	
1996	Chicago Hope	Cherchez LaFemme	Episode: "Right to Life"	
1996	Swift Justice	Andrew Coffin	3 episodes	
1996	Living Single	Jackson Turner	Episode: "Kiss of the Spider Man"	
1996	The Tomorrow Man	Jonathan Driscoll	Television film	
1996–1998	NYPD Blue	Ferdinand Hollie / Jamaal	2 episodes	
1996–1999	Nash Bridges	Arnold / Gordon Keller / Whip Tyrell	2 episodes	
1996–2005	Law & Order	Mr. Baylor / Rodney Fallon	4 episodes	
1997	Five Desperate Hours	Joseph Grange	Television film	
1998	The Hunger	Vampire	Episode: "Fly-By-Night"	
1998	Creature	Lieutenant Thomas Peniston / Werewolf	Miniseries	
1998	Naked City: Justice with a Bullet	Chaz Villanueva	Television film	
1998	Thirst	Dr. Lawrence Carver	Television film	
1998–1999	Homicide: Life on the Street	Federal Agent Mike Giardello	22 episodes	
2000	Homicide: The Movie	Officer Mike Giardello	Television film	
2000	Touched by an Angel	Antonio	Episode: "Here I Am"	
2000–2001	The $treet	Tom Divack	12 episodes	
2001	Strong Medicine	James 'Junior' Bell	Episode: "Mortality"	
2001	100 Centre Street	Jacob Lenz	Episode: "Andromeda and the Monster"	
2002	The Practice	Ray McMurphy	Episode: "Pro Se"	
2002	Third Watch	Father Romero	Episode: "The Unforgiven"	
2002	A Nero Wolfe Mystery	Ambassador Theodore Kelefy	Episode: "Immune to Murder"	
2002	Girls Club	Nicholas Hahn	9 episodes	
2003	The Division	Dr. Pembroke	Episode: "Wish You Were Here"	
2003	Lucky	Lord Marion	Episode: "The Method"	
2003	Street Time	Jesse Haslim	Episode: "Brothers"	
2004	Half & Half	Darrell Washington	Episode: "The Big Employee Benefits Episode"	
2004	Soul Food	Jules	2 episodes	
2004	5ive Days to Midnight	Tim Sanders	5 episodes	
2004	NYPD 2069	Lieutenant Garner	Pilot	
2005	Law & Order: Trial by Jury	Orlando Ramirez	Episode: "Boys Will Be Boys"	
2006	South Beach	Robert Fuentes	8 episodes	
2006	Ghost Whisperer	Ely Fisher	Episode: "Fury"	
2006	Bones	Richard Benoit	Episode: "The Man in the Morgue"	
2006	Dr. Vegas		Episode: "For Love or Money"	
2006	Las Vegas	Reggie Archibald	Episode: "White Christmas"	
2006–2008	CSI: Miami	Chief Braga	2 episodes	
2007	Kidnapped	Vance	2 episodes	
2008	New Amsterdam	Special Agent Derek Lawson	Episode: "Legacy"	
2008	Xenophobia	Young	Television film	
2009–2011	Breaking Bad	Gus Fring	26 episodes	
2010	Leverage	Alexander Moto	Episode: "The Scheherazade Job"	
2010	Lie to Me	Beau Hackman	Episode: "Black and White"	
2010	Detroit 1-8-7	Eddie Henderson	Episode: "Shelter"	
2011	Criminal Minds: Suspect Behavior	Gordon Ramirez	Episode: "The Time is Now"	
2011–2017	Once Upon a Time	Sidney Glass / Magic Mirror	14 episodes	
2012	NYC 22	Harvey Williams	2 episodes	
2012–2013	Community	Gilbert Lawson	2 episodes	
2012–2014	Revolution	Lieutenant Tom Neville	42 episodes	
2013	Over / Under	Oliver Ohrt	Television film	
2013	Revolution: Enemies of the State	Lieutenant Tom Neville	Television shorts	
2013	Axe Cop	Army Chihuahua	Voice; episode: "Night Mission: Stealing Friends Back"	
2013	Timms Valley	Pruit Normings	Voice; episode: "Pilot"	
2014	30 for 30	Narrator	Voice; episode: "Requiem for the Big East"	
2015	Allegiance	Oscar Christoph	7 episodes	
2015	Drunk History	Andrés Pico	Episode: "Los Angeles"	
2016–2017	The Get Down	Pastor Ramon Cruz	10 episodes	
2017	Rebel	Charles Gold	4 episodes	
2017–2019	Dear White People	Dr. Edward Ruskins / The Narrator	23 episodes	
2017–2022	Better Call Saul	Gus Fring	34 episodes; also director for episode: "Axe and Grind"	
2018	Westworld	El Lazo	Episode: "Reunion"	
2018	Dallas & Robo	Victor Goldsmith	Voice; 5 episodes	
2019	Jett	Charlie Baudelaire	9 episodes	
2019	Creepshow	Doc	Episode: "Gray Matter"	
2019–2023	Harley Quinn	Lex Luthor	Voice; 11 episodes	
2019–2023	Godfather of Harlem	Adam Clayton Powell Jr.	21 episodes	
2019–2023	The Mandalorian	Moff Gideon / Gideon's Force clones	9 episodes	
2019–2026	The Boys	Stan Edgar / The Guy from Vought	13 episodes	
2020	Home Movie: The Princess Bride	The Grandfather	Episode: "Chapter Five: Life Is Pain"	
2020–2021	DuckTales	Phantom Blot	Voice; 3 episodes	
2022	The Boys Presents: Diabolical	Stan Edgar / The Guy from Vought	Voice; episode: "One Plus One Equals Two"	
2022	Cyberpunk: Edgerunners	Faraday	English dub; 6 episodes	
2023	Kaleidoscope	Leo Pap / Ray Vernon	Miniseries; 8 episodes	
2024–present	The Gentlemen	Stanley Johnston	7 episodes	
2024	Moon Girl and Devil Dinosaur	Granite	Voice; episode: "The Devil You Know"	
2024	Parish	Gracián "Gray" Parish	6 episodes; also executive producer	
2025	The Residence	A. B. Wynter	8 episodes	
2025	Poker Face	Fred Finch	Episode: "Last Looks"	
2025	Gen V	Stan Edgar	Episode: "Cooking Lessons"	
TBA	All the Sinners Bleed †	Ezekiel Wiggins	Limited series	

=== Theatre ===
Giancarlo Esposito Theatre credits
Year	Title	Role	Venue	Ref.
1968–1969	Maggie Flynn	Andrew	ANTA Theatre, Broadway	
1970–1971	The Me Nobody Knows	Understudy	Helen Hayes Theatre, Broadway	
1972	Lost in the Stars	Alex	Imperial Theatre, Broadway	
1973	Seesaw	Julio Gonzalez	Uris Theatre, Broadway	
1980–1981	Zooman and the Sign	Zooman	Theater Four, Off-Broadway	
1981	Merrily We Roll Along	Valedictorian	Alvin Theatre, Broadway	
1984	Do Lord Remember Me		American Palace Theatre, Off-Broadway	
1984–1985	Balm in Gilead	Ernesto	Circle Repertory Theatre, Off-Broadway	
1987–1988	Don't Get God Started	Jack / Silk	Longacre Theatre, Broadway	
1991	Distant Fires	Foos	Linda Gross Theater, Off-Broadway	
1992	Distant Fires	Foos	Circle in the Square Downtown, Off-Broadway	
1993	The Root	Willie	Linda Gross Theater, Off-Broadway	
1994	Trafficking in Broken Hearts	Papo	Linda Gross Theater, Off-Broadway	
1995	Sacrilege	Ramon	Belasco Theatre, Broadway	
2003	The 24 Hour Plays	Earl	American Airlines Theatre, Broadway	
2008	Cat on a Hot Tin Roof	Gooper	Broadhurst Theatre, Broadway	
2012	Storefront Church	Donald Calderon	Linda Gross Theater, Off-Broadway	

=== Video games ===
Year	Title	Role	Notes	Ref.
2013	The Law of the Jungle	Father	Destiny video game trailer	
2014	Payday 2	"The Dentist" / Dr. Helmann	Likeness and vocal performance	
2021	Far Cry 6	"El Presidente" Antón Castillo	Likeness and vocal performance portrayed character in promotional marketing	

=== Other work ===
Year	Title	Role	Project	Notes	Ref.
1986	"Growing Up"	Himself	Music video	Whodini song	
1996	"California"	Rich man	Music video	Mylène Farmer song	
2017	Better Call Saul: Los Pollos Hermanos Employee Training	Gus Fring	Web series	Voice; 10 episodes	
2020	Game Changer	Himself	Game show	Episode: "Ham It Up"	
2021	Vought News Network: Seven on 7 with Cameron Coleman	Stan Edgar	Web series	Voice; episode Aug 2021	
2022	The Big Lie	Dr. Greco	Podcast series		
2025	"Cabin Talk"	Himself	Feature	De La Soul song	

== Awards and nominations ==
Year	Association	Category	Nominated work	Result	Ref.
1995	Independent Spirit Awards	Best Supporting Male	Fresh	Nominated	
1995	National Board of Review	Best Cast	The Usual Suspects	Won	
1999	NAACP Image Awards	Outstanding Supporting Actor in a Drama Series	Homicide: Life on the Street	Nominated	
2011	NAACP Image Awards	Outstanding Supporting Actor in a Drama Series	Breaking Bad	Nominated	
2011	Saturn Awards	Best Guest Starring Role on Television	Breaking Bad	Nominated	
2012	Critics' Choice Television Awards	Best Supporting Actor in a Drama Series	Breaking Bad	Won	
2012	Primetime Emmy Awards	Outstanding Supporting Actor in a Drama Series	Breaking Bad	Nominated	
2012	Satellite Awards	Best Supporting Actor – Series, Miniseries or Television Film	Breaking Bad	Nominated	
2012	Saturn Awards	Best Supporting Actor on Television	Breaking Bad	Nominated	
2012	Screen Actors Guild Awards	Outstanding Performance by an Ensemble in a Drama Series	Breaking Bad	Nominated	
2013	Saturn Awards	Best Supporting Actor on Television	Revolution	Nominated	
2019	Screen Actors Guild Awards	Outstanding Performance by an Ensemble in a Drama Series	Better Call Saul	Nominated	
2019	Primetime Emmy Awards	Outstanding Supporting Actor in a Drama Series	Better Call Saul	Nominated	
2020	Primetime Emmy Awards	Outstanding Supporting Actor in a Drama Series	Better Call Saul	Nominated	
2020	Primetime Emmy Awards	Outstanding Guest Actor in a Drama Series	The Mandalorian	Nominated	
2021	Screen Actors Guild Awards	Outstanding Performance by an Ensemble in a Drama Series	Better Call Saul	Nominated	
2021	MTV Movie & TV Awards	Best Villain	The Mandalorian	Nominated	
2021	Saturn Awards	Best Guest Starring Role on Television	The Mandalorian	Nominated	
2021	Primetime Emmy Awards	Outstanding Supporting Actor in a Drama Series	The Mandalorian	Nominated	
2021	The Game Awards	Best Performance	Far Cry 6	Nominated	
2022	New York Game Awards 2022	Great White Way Award for Best Overall Acting in a Game	Far Cry 6	Nominated	
2022	Hollywood Critics Association TV Awards	Best Supporting Actor in a Broadcast Network or Cable Series, Drama	Better Call Saul	Won	
2023	Critics' Choice Television Awards	Best Supporting Actor in a Drama Series	Better Call Saul	Won	
2023	NAACP Image Awards	Outstanding Directing in a Drama Series	Better Call Saul (for "Axe and Grind")	Won	
2023	Screen Actors Guild Awards	Outstanding Performance by an Ensemble in a Drama Series	Better Call Saul	Nominated	
2024	Saturn Awards	Best Guest Star in a Television Series	The Mandalorian	Nominated	
2024	Prize for American-Italian Relations (PAIR)	Arts & Culture		Won	
2025	Golden Raspberry Awards	Worst Screen Combo (Note: Shared with the entire cast of Megalopolis)	Megalopolis	Nominated	
2025	Primetime Emmy Awards	Outstanding Guest Actor in a Drama Series	The Boys	Nominated	
