= Christopher Thornton =

American actor (born 1967)

- Born: March 29, 1967 (age 59); New Orleans, Louisiana, U.S.
- Education: University of New Orleans
- Occupation: Actor
- Years active: 1990–present

Christopher Thornton (born March 29, 1967) is an American actor. He is known for his role as Kenny "Shammy" Shamberg in Magnum P.I., and has had numerous other film and television roles from 1990 to the present.

== Early life and education ==
Thornton was born in New Orleans, Louisiana. His father was an amateur opera singer who appeared in local theater. Thornton appeared in several plays while majoring in theater at the University of New Orleans, but quit college after two years to relocate to Los Angeles and train at the Stella Adler Academy.

== Career ==
Thornton made his first feature film appearance in the 1990 horror sequel Watchers II, playing a young man who gets his eyes gouged out by the mutant antagonist. Only two years later, at age 25, Thornton suffered an accident while rock climbing which fractured two vertebrae and left him paralyzed from the waist down. He returned to mostly theater roles for the remainder of the 1990s. In 2000, he was cast to play Hamlet at the Lillian Theater in Los Angeles. Believed to be the first actor to ever play the iconic Shakespeare character in a wheelchair, Thornton's performance won rave reviews.

Thornton has gone on to appear in numerous film and television roles. He has recurred in TV series such as Any Day Now, Rules of Engagement and Vice Principals, and had guest roles in Curb Your Enthusiasm, Alias, Brothers & Sisters, My Name Is Earl, Grey's Anatomy, and Will & Grace. From 2018 to 2024, he played recurring character Kenny "Shammy" Shamberg, a Marine veteran paralyzed during a tour of duty in Iraq, on the CBS reboot of Magnum P.I.

Thornton was both writer and lead actor for the 2010 film Sympathy for Delicious, playing disc jockey "Delicious" Dean O'Dwyer. The film was directed by close friend Mark Ruffalo, who also stars in it alongside Orlando Bloom, Laura Linney, and Juliette Lewis.

He will appear in the upcoming Netflix limited series adaptation All the Sinners Bleed, based on the S. A. Cosby novel of the same name.

== Filmography ==
=== Film ===
Year	Title	Role	Notes	Ref.
1990	Watchers II	Boy at Motel		
1992	Valhalla	Paul Reitnauer	Lead Actor	
1993	A Song for You	Donny O’Brien	Short film	
2002	Bug	Gary – Guy Hit by Car		
2005	Pretty Persuasion	Emmett Friedman		
2005	Hitched	Gary	TV movie	
2010	Sympathy for Delicious	"Delicious" Dean O’Dwyer	Lead actor and writer	
2017	Anything	Ted Sachman		

=== Television ===
Key
†	Denotes television productions that have not yet been released

Year	Title	Role	Notes	Ref.
1991	Homefront	Bartender	Episode: “Man, This Joint Is Jumping”	
2000	Any Day Now	Marty	3 episodes	
2001	Curb Your Enthusiasm	Cliff Cobb	Episode: “Trick or Treat”	
2001	Alias	Nevil	2 episodes	
2008	Unhitched	Darren	Episode: “Yorkshire Terrier Sucked Into the Internet”	
2008	My Name Is Earl	Brett Hansen	Episode: "Killerball"	
2010	Brothers & Sisters	Aaron	Episode: "Time After Time: Part 2"	
2010	Lie to Me	Johnny Wheels	Episode: "The Canary Song”	
2013	Rules of Engagement	Edward	3 episodes	
2015	Battle Creek	Mickey Long	Episode: “The Hand-Off”	
2016	Grey's Anatomy	Daniel Campbell	Episode: “Falling Slowly”	
2017	Vice Principals	Mr. Milner	5 episodes	
2018	Speechless	Chris	Episode: "N-o-Nominee"	
2018	Santa Clarita Diet	Kevin	Episode: "Going Pre-med"	
2018–2024	Magnum P.I.	Kenny "Shammy" Shamberg	Recurring role, 27 episodes	
2020	Will & Grace	Luke	2 episodes	
2020	Broke	Max Lefleur	2 episodes	
2022– present	The Lincoln Lawyer	Sam Scales	8 episodes	
2023	Class of '09	James Row	Episode: "Orders Night"	
2024	Presumed Innocent	Jeremy Buck	Episode: "The Elements"	
2024	FBI: Most Wanted	Elias Nelson	Episode: "The Electric Company"	
2026-	The Pitt	Dr. Caleb Jefferson	Recurring role, 5 episodes	
2026	Doc	Troy Willis	Episode: "Fare Well"	
TBA	All the Sinners Bleed †	Dispatcher Cam Trowder	Limited series	
