= Miles Hubley and Tommy White =

Filmmaking duo

Miles Hubley (born April 11, 1985) and Tommy White (born July 9, 1985) are an American filmmaking duo. They are known for their work on the action thriller film Runner (2026), and the Academy Award winning documentary film The Cove (2009).

Hubley is the grandson of animator John Hubley, and nephew of animator Emily Hubley and musician Georgia Hubley.

== Lives and careers ==
In 2015, Hubley and White sold their Hollywood Black List script, The Shave, to Route One Entertainment and Lost City. It was announced that Chris Columbus was producing the film.

In 2025, the duo sold their 2023 Black List script Runner to A Higher Standard. The film stars Owen Wilson, Alan Ritchson, Rodrigo Santoro, and Leila George, and is directed by Scott Waugh.
