= Leila George =

Australian and American actress (born 1992)

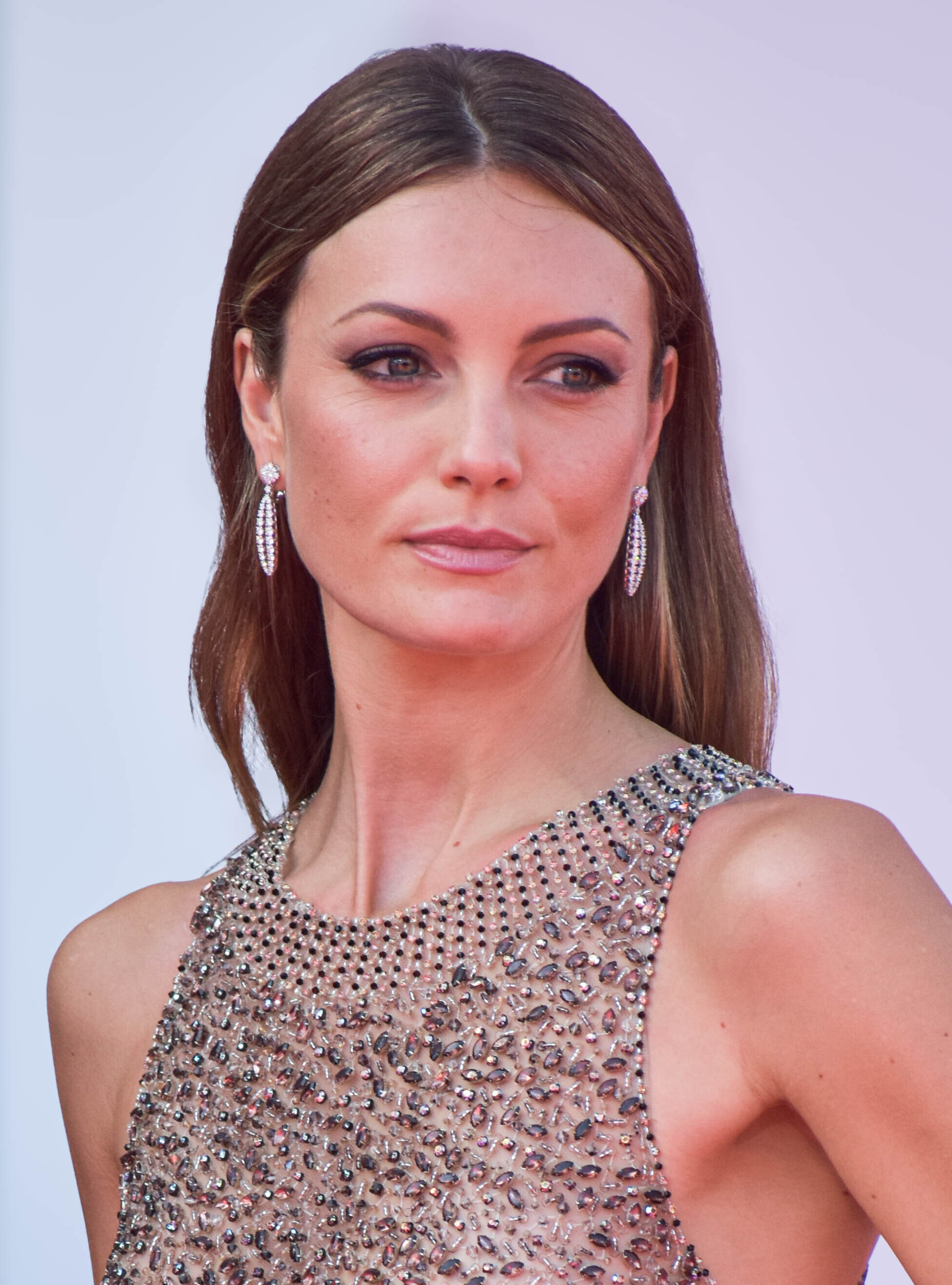
- George in 2024
- Born: Leila George D'Onofrio; 1992 (age 33–34); Sydney, New South Wales, Australia
- Citizenship: Australia, United States, United Kingdom
- Occupation: Actress
- Years active: 2016–present
- Spouse: Sean Penn (m. 2020; div. 2022)
- Parents: Vincent D'Onofrio (father); Greta Scacchi (mother)

Leila George D'Onofrio (born 1992) is an Australian and American actress. She is the daughter of actors Vincent D'Onofrio and Greta Scacchi.

== Early life and education ==
Leila George D'Onofrio was born in 1992 in Sydney, New South Wales, Australia, to actor and producer Vincent D'Onofrio and actress Greta Scacchi, and raised by her mother in Hurstpierpoint near Brighton, East Sussex, United Kingdom.

In 2008, she took acting classes at Brighton College. The following year, she attended Crawley College, her mother's alma mater, and in 2010, studied at the Arts Educational Schools, London. In 2011, she went to Australia to study at Sydney Film School. In 2012, she went to the United States to study at the Lee Strasberg Institute in New York City near her father.

== Career ==
In 2013, George worked on the documentary The Last Impresario as an additional camera operator. In 2014, she starred with her mother in Anton Chekhov's The Seagull for Black Swan Theatre Company in Perth. Her mother acted as Arkadina, and she acted as Nina, Arkadina's romantic rival.

In 2016, she played the starring role in Mother, May I Sleep with Danger?, her first feature television film. She appeared in the films Mortal Engines (2018) and The Kid (2019).

In 2019, George began playing the younger version of Ellen Barkin's character, Janine "Smurf" Cody, in the television series Animal Kingdom.

George will appear in the upcoming Netflix limited series adaptation All the Sinners Bleed, based on the S. A. Cosby novel of the same name.

== Personal life ==
George began a relationship with actor Sean Penn in 2016. They married on 30 July 2020. George filed for divorce on 15 October 2021. The divorce was finalised on 22 April 2022.

Following the 2019–20 Australian bushfires, she co-produced a celebrity fundraiser to support long-term conservation of areas affected by the bushfires. The event was hosted by the Los Angeles Zoo.

== Filmography ==
=== Film ===
Key
†	Denotes works that have not yet been released

Year	Title	Role	Notes	Ref.
2018	Mortal Engines	Katherine Valentine		
2019	The Kid	Sara Cutler		
2023	Gonzo Girl	September McAvoy		
2024	He Ain't Heavy	Jade		
2026	Runner	Kate		
TBA	Road House 2 †	TBA	Post-production	
TBA	White Lies †	TBA	Post-production	
TBA	The Long Home †	Edna Hodges	Completed	
TBA	Copperhead †	TBA	Filming	

=== Television ===
Year	Title	Role	Notes	Ref.
2016	Mother, May I Sleep with Danger?	Leah Lewisohn	Television film	
2019–2022	Animal Kingdom	Young Janine "Smurf" Cody	Recurring role (season 4); main role (seasons 5–6)	
2024	Disclaimer	Young Catherine Ravenscroft	Miniseries	
2025	The Beast in Me	Madison Jarvis	Miniseries	
2026	Love Story	Kelly Klein	Recurring role	
TBA	All the Sinners Bleed †	Marlow Stoner	Limited series	
