= Blacktop Wasteland =

2020 noir mystery novel by S.A. Cosby

- First edition cover
- Author: S.A. Cosby
- Language: English
- Genre: Crime; thriller
- Publisher: Flatiron Books (US); Headline (UK)
- Publication date: July 14, 2020
- Publication place: United States
- Media type: Print (hardcover), e-book, audio
- Pages: 304 (1st ed. Hardcover)
- ISBN: 9781250252685 (1st ed. Hardcover)
- OCLC: 1112262092
- Dewey Decimal: 813.6
- LC Class: PS303.O7988 B53 2020

Blacktop Wasteland is a noir novel written by S.A. Cosby and published in July 2020 by Flatiron Books.

== Plot ==
Beauregard "Bug" Montage is a hardworking black mechanic with a remarkable talent for driving. He has a checkered past, but has chosen instead the path of the straight and narrow. He lives in rural Virginia, but is now struggling to keep his family afloat, and his auto shop is failing, His sons need braces and glasses, and his mother faces eviction. Desperate, Beauregard plans a final heist to solve his problems. Ironically, returning to crime feels strangely comfortable. However, the heist goes wrong, plunging Beauregard into a dangerous situation, and Beauregard gets caught up in the chaos that follows.

== Analysis ==
=== A means to an end ===
Gabino Iglesias, reviewing this book for NPR, says that S.A. Cosby, the author, shows himself to be empathetic to the allure of crime. Through the depiction of Bug, the audience sees that Cosby gets how financial hardship can push even good people to make bad choices. Through Bug, we see that Cosby recognizes the sacrifices that people sometimes make, believing their actions are ultimately for noble reasons. Furthermore, Cosby ably expresses this sentiment through Bug, a complex character burdened by the legacy of his now absent criminal father – who was also a driver. Bug has to contend with the conflicting emotions of guilt and intense excitement that come with a criminal escape. Despite past imprisonment, the pressure to take care of his family – from preserving his business to his children's well-being and his daughter's college dreams – offsets the terrifying concern of returning to jail. The desire to offer his children a better future surpasses the personal risk.

=== Racial prejudice ===
Iglesias says that this book serves as a strongly effective criticism of racial prejudice, starting in Appalachia and resonating throughout the country. While violence is present, the most lasting impact comes from the sadness and yearning for a better life that permeates the story. Additionally, Iglesias says that Blacktop Wasteland directly confronts racism. Author S.A. Cosby, a Black man from the American South, brings his own experiences to life in the story. He portrays the various realities of being Black in areas where symbols of perceived racial hatred are still present, such as the Confederate flag.

== Awards ==
In 2021, Blacktop Wasteland book won the Anthony Award. It also won the 2020 Los Angeles Times Book Prize. And it was chosen as a New York Times Notable Book.

Year	Award		Result	Ref
2020	Goodreads Choice Awards	Mystery & Thriller	Nominated—16th	
2020	Los Angeles Times Book Prize	Mystery/Thriller	Won	
2021	Anthony Award	Novel	Won	
2021	Barry Award	Novel	Won	
2021	BCALA Literary Awards	Fiction	Honor	
2021	CWA Gold Dagger	—	Shortlisted	
2021	ITW Award	Hardcover Novel	Won	
2021	Lefty Award	Mystery Novel	Shortlisted	
2021	Macavity Award	Mystery Novel	Won	
2021	RUSA Codes Reading List	Adrenaline	Shortlisted	

== See also ==
- Razorblade Tears, also by S.A. Cosby
- Harlem Shuffle by Colson Whitehead
- Crook Manifesto, also by Colson Whitehead
