= King of Ashes =

King of Ashes may refer to:

- King of Ashes, 2018 novel by Raymond E. Feist
- King of Ashes (novel), 2025 novel by S. A. Cosby
- King of Ashes, character in Sword Art Online Abridged
