= Bleeding Fingers Music =

Musical collective

- Type: Subsidiary
- Industry: Music production
- Founded: 2013; 13 years ago
- Founders: Russell Emanuel, Hans Zimmer and Steve Kofsky
- Headquarters: Santa Monica, California
- Area served: Worldwide
- Services: Score music for film, television, and digital media
- Parent: Sony Music Publishing
- Website: www.bleedingfingersmusic.com

Bleeding Fingers Music is a collective of composers that create film and television scores. A joint venture between composer Hans Zimmer, his business partner Steve Kofsky, and Extreme Music, the production arm of Sony Music Publishing, it is a custom scoring company in the film and television industry.

== History ==
Zimmer began composing music for the Extreme production library in the late 1990s, and when Extreme expanded from the UK to the United States in 2001, it set up its offices at Zimmer's Remote Control Productions in Santa Monica, California. In 2012, as Extreme sought to meet increased requests from clients for custom scores for television productions, it partnered with Kofsky and Zimmer to develop what would become Bleeding Fingers Custom Music Shop. During an eight-month test run prior to the company's launch, it created music for 30 television shows, and in August 2013, Bleeding Fingers was officially founded. Extreme's Russell Emanuel served as its CEO and chief creative officer and Kofsky its chairman.

With a staff of experienced TV and film composers assembled by Zimmer, Bleeding Fingers initially focused on unscripted, reality, documentary and light drama television productions, developing custom micro-libraries for client properties in keeping with each program's style and tone. Its early work included scores for Survivor, Hatfields & McCoys, The Men Who Built America and Mountain Men, for which it won both ASCAP and BMI awards.

In 2016, Bleeding Fingers was selected to score the BBC docu-series Planet Earth II. The theme was written by Zimmer, and composers Jacob Shea and Jasha Klebe wrote the score. More than a year was spent composing the score for the series, which was recorded by an 80-piece orchestra at Air Studios in London. Zimmer, Shea and Klebe were nominated for a British Academy of Television Craft award in the Best Original Television Music category, and Shea and Klebe were nominated for the Emmy in Outstanding Music Composition for a Series (Original Dramatic Score).

Bleeding Fingers also composed the score for the BBC's Blue Planet II, a sequel to the 2001 documentary The Blue Planet. To promote the series, Zimmer collaborated with Radiohead to create "(ocean) Bloom," an orchestral reworking of Radiohead's song "Bloom" from the 2011 album The King of Limbs. Emanuel produced the track, which debuted in September 2017. Zimmer co-wrote the score with Shea and Dave Fleming.

In October 2017, it was announced that Bleeding Fingers would replace longtime composer Alf Clausen for The Simpsons, beginning with season 29.

In 2020, Bleeding Fingers wrote the music package for the Jeopardy! The Greatest of All Time special which aired in January of that year on ABC. The following year, they wrote music cues for Celebrity Wheel of Fortune. When both Jeopardy! and Wheel of Fortune premiered their respective 38th and 39th seasons in syndication on September 13, 2021, Bleeding Fingers re-arranged the main theme on the former while overhauling the music package on the latter featuring an arrangement of the longtime "Changing Keys" theme song, which was used on Wheel during the 1980s and 1990s. Bleeding Fingers also did the music package for the Jeopardy! National College Championship in 2022.

Bleeding Fingers is based at Remote Control's Santa Monica complex, known as "The Stanford of Score." As of 2018, there were 11 full-time composers on the Bleeding Fingers staff, many of whom had apprenticed with Zimmer. Bleeding Fingers Music worked on the music for the stop-motion Netflix television special Alien Xmas.

In January 2026, it was announced that Zimmer and Bleeding Fingers would compose the score for the upcoming HBO adaptation of the Harry Potter series. The following month, it was announced Zimmer and Bleeding Fingers would compose the music for the forthcoming Netflix limited series adaptation of All the Sinners Bleed, based on the Southern noir novel of the same name by S. A. Cosby.
