= All the Sinners Bleed (TV series) =

American television series

- Genre: Crime drama
- Created by: Joe Robert Cole
- Based on: All the Sinners Bleed by S.A. Cosby
- Written by: Joe Robert Cole
- Directed by: Joe Robert Cole
- Starring: Sope Dirisu; Nicole Beharie; John Douglas Thompson; Daniel Ezra; Andrea Cortés; Murray Bartlett; Leila George
- Music by: Hans Zimmer
- Country of origin: United States
- Original language: English

Production
- Executive producers: Joe Robert Cole; S.A. Cosby
- Production companies: Amblin Television; Higher Ground

Original release
- Network: Netflix

All the Sinners Bleed is an upcoming television miniseries for Netflix adapted from the novel of the same name by S.A. Cosby. The nine episode limited series was ordered by Netflix in May 2025.

== Premise ==
A sheriff leads the hunt for a serial killer preying on the black community in Bible Belt America.

== Cast ==
=== Main ===
- Sope Dirisu as Titus Crown
- Nicole Beharie as Darlene Taylor
- John Douglas Thompson as Albert Crown
- Daniel Ezra as Marquis Crown
- Andrea Cortés as Deputy Carla Ortiz
- Murray Bartlett as Scott Cunningham
- Leila George as Marlow Stoner

=== Recurring ===
- Giancarlo Esposito as Ezekiel Wiggins
- David Lyons as Jasper Sanderson
- Donald Elise Watkins as Deputy Trey Avery
- Mackenzie Astin as Deputy Pip Collins
- Jordan M. Cox as Deputy Tom Sadler
- Cullen Moss as Deputy Roger Simmons
- Angus O'Brien as Deputy Davy Burks
- Cranston Johnson as Reverend Jamal Addison
- Christopher Matthew Cook as Royce Lazare
- Christopher Thornton as Dispatcher Cam Trowder
- Grace Junot as Julie Kim
- Bill Oberst Jr. as Pastor Elias Hillington
- Kelly Jenrette as Helen Crown
- Ren Brown as Band Member/Pianist

=== Guest ===
- Amy Madigan as Scarlett Cunningham

== Production ==
=== Development ===
The adaptation of the Southern noir novel All the Sinners Bleed by S.A. Cosby has Joe Robert Cole as writer, showrunner, executive producer, and director of multiple episodes. Executive producers on the series include Cosby. It is produced by Amblin Television and Higher Ground. The nine episode limited series was ordered by Netflix in May 2025.

=== Casting ===
Ṣọpẹ́ Dìrísù joined the cast in August 2025. The following month, Nicole Beharie and John Douglas Thompson joined the starring cast. In October 2025, Daniel Ezra, Andrea Cortés, and Murray Bartlett were cast as series regulars. The following month, Leila George joined the cast and Giancarlo Esposito was one of a number of recurring cast members added in December. In January 2026, Amy Madigan joined the series as guest star. In February 2026, Kelly Jenrette joined the series in a recurring role.

=== Filming ===
Filming started in Atlanta, Georgia in November 2025 and continued into early 2026.

=== Music ===
In February 2026, it was announced that Hans Zimmer and his composer collective Bleeding Fingers Music will compose the score.
