= His House =

2020 thriller film directed by Remi Weekes

- Official British release poster
- Directed by: Remi Weekes
- Screenplay by: Remi Weekes
- Story by: Felicity Evans; Toby Venables
- Produced by: Aidan Elliott; Martin Gentles; Arnon Milchan; Ed King; Roy Lee
- Starring: Wunmi Mosaku; Sope Dirisu; Matt Smith
- Cinematography: Jo Willems
- Edited by: Julia Bloch
- Music by: Roque Baños
- Production companies: Regency Enterprises; BBC Films; Vertigo Entertainment; Starchild Pictures
- Distributed by: Netflix
- Release dates: January 27, 2020 (Sundance); October 30, 2020 (United States)
- Running time: 93 minutes
- Countries: United States; United Kingdom
- Languages: English; Dinka

His House is a 2020 folk horror thriller film written and directed by Remi Weekes, from a story by Felicity Evans and Toby Venables. It stars Wunmi Mosaku, Sope Dirisu and Matt Smith. The film tells the story of a refugee couple from South Sudan, struggling to adjust to their new life in an English town that has an evil lurking beneath the surface.

It had its world premiere at the 2020 Sundance Film Festival on 27 January 2020. It was released on 30 October 2020 by Netflix, and received widespread acclaim from critics.

== Plot ==
Bol and Rial are refugees fleeing with their daughter, Nyagak, from war-torn South Sudan. They brave stormy waters on an overcrowded motorboat, along with fellow refugees traversing the perilous English Channel from France to seek asylum. Although they survive the treacherous crossing, their daughter and many others do not. When they are finally granted probational asylum in Britain three months later, the government assigns them a shabby house with peeling walls and dismal furnishings on the outskirts of London. They are given strict restrictions or they may face deportation. They experience racism and hatred from their tenement neighbours. They are met by their case worker Mark, who tells them he hopes they are two of "the good ones."

Bol tries to assimilate: he sings football songs, asks Rial to use utensils rather than her hands when they eat, and even changes how he dresses. Bol wants to prove to the government that he and Rial belong in the UK. Rial, however, clings to their culture. She retains their daughter's necklace, dresses in colourful clothes, and rather than using a table, sits on the floor to eat. Bol and Rial soon experience strange phenomena in their new home and see visions of Nyagak and a mysterious man, who both escape into the walls.

Rial figures out that the evil in the house is an apeth or "night witch." She tells Bol the story of a poor man in her village who accidentally stole from an apeth by the river. When the thief built his home, the apeth moved in with him and haunted him. Rial believes that an apeth has followed them and if they repay their debt, the apeth will bring Nyagak back to them. However it is not immediately clear what the "debt" is. Bol burns everything they brought with them, but the apeth continues to torment him and the couple's relationship deteriorates. He goes to Mark and requests new accommodation under the guise that their unit is infested with rats, but is unable to convince him. Bol tears apart the house looking for the apeth, which threatens the couple's chances of staying in the UK when Mark discovers the damage. Rial expresses her desire to leave, but Bol confines her within the house and summons the apeth on his own. The apeth accuses Bol of being a thief and claims that he has wrongfully claimed a life that didn't belong to him. The apeth then offers Bol a deal: his life for Nyagak's, but he refuses this offer, resulting in Bol being forced into a state of catatonia.

Rial escapes the house but finds herself inexplicably back in South Sudan in a familiar classroom. She is reunited with old friends, who are revealed in a further flashback to be victims of a horrendous massacre. Rial was able to survive by hiding. Bol finds her and they escape as violence grips the region, but find that a bus they need to board would only let people with children on. Desperate, Bol sees Nyagak in the crowd and abducts her, falsely claiming that she is their daughter. The couple get on the bus and escape, leaving Nyagak's real mother behind as gunfire erupts. Later, when crossing the rough sea, Nyagak and others fall overboard. Neither Bol nor Rial reaches her in time. Having accepted what they did, Bol decides to repay the debt to the apeth and tells Rial. Bol starts to let the apeth into his skin and Nyagak enters the room and returns to Rial. Rial chooses to save Bol instead of accepting this alternative reality, by slitting the apeth's throat.

Later, Mark comes to inspect the house to find it repaired. Bol and Rial tell him they have chosen to stay and make it their new home. They say Rial killed the witch that haunted them, which Mark finds funny. Bol says they decided to live with the ghosts of their past from South Sudan, including Nyagak.

== Cast ==
- Wunmi Mosaku as Rial
- Sope Dirisu as Bol
- Matt Smith as Mark
- Javier Botet (on-set) and Cornell John (voice) as the Apeth
- Emily Taaffe as Dr. Hayes
- Malaika Abigaba as Nyagak
- Dominic Coleman as the lead immigration officer

== Production ==
His House was developed by British production company Starchild Pictures run by producers Ed King and Martin Gentles. In August 2017, it was announced that Remi Weekes would direct the film from a screenplay he wrote. The Weinstein Company filed a lawsuit against Starchild Pictures claiming they had backed out of an unsigned distribution agreement. In March 2018, it was announced Wunmi Mosaku, Sope Dirisu had joined the cast of the film, with the lawsuit not proceeding and The Weinstein Company no longer attached. New Regency Pictures, BBC Films and Vertigo Entertainment were set to finance and produce. In May 2018, Matt Smith joined the cast of the film.

== Release ==
His House had its world premiere at the 2020 Sundance Film Festival on 27 January 2020. Netflix acquired distribution rights to the film. It was released on 30 October 2020.

== Reception ==
On review aggregator Rotten Tomatoes, the film holds an approval rating of 100% based on 128 reviews, with an average rating of 8.1/10. The website's critics consensus reads, "Featuring genuine scares through every corridor, His House is a terrifying look at the specters of the refugee experience and a stunning feature debut for Remi Weekes." On Metacritic, it has a score of 72/100 based on reviews from 19 critics, indicating "generally favorable" reviews.

Writing for Rolling Stone, K. Austin Collins gave the film a score of 3.5/5 stars, writing that the film is "a strong debut, and exciting -- even as its horrors risk redundancy as the film wears on -- for its uncanny merging of political experience and the usual, perilous haunted-house thrills." Justin Chang of the Los Angeles Times described the film as "one of those return-of-the-repressed freakouts in which suspense and social conscience effectively breathe as one", and added: "it’s a calculated mix of migrant drama and B-movie thrills that can feel reminiscent of movies as different as Jacques Audiard’s Dheepan and especially Romola Garai’s Amulet".

=== Accolades ===
Award	Date of ceremony	Category	Recipient(s)	Result	Ref.
Critics' Choice Super Award	10 January 2021	Best Actor in a Horror Movie	Sope Dirisu	Nominated	
British Independent Film Awards	18 February 2021	Best British Independent Film	Remi Weekes, Aidan Elliott, Martin Gentles, Arnon Milchan, Edward King, Roy Lee	Nominated	
British Independent Film Awards	18 February 2021	Best Director	Remi Weekes	Won	
British Independent Film Awards	18 February 2021	Best Performance by an Actor	Sope Dirisu	Nominated	
British Independent Film Awards	18 February 2021	Best Performance by an Actress	Wunmi Mosaku	Won	
British Independent Film Awards	18 February 2021	Best Screenplay	Remi Weekes	Nominated	
British Independent Film Awards	18 February 2021	The Douglas Hickox Award (Best Debut Director)	Remi Weekes	Nominated	
British Independent Film Awards	18 February 2021	Best Debut Screenwriter	Remi Weekes	Nominated	
British Independent Film Awards	18 February 2021	Best Casting	Carmen Cuba	Nominated	
British Independent Film Awards	18 February 2021	Breakthrough Producer	Edward King and Martin Gentles	Nominated	
British Independent Film Awards	18 February 2021	Best Cinematography	Jo Willems	Nominated	
British Independent Film Awards	18 February 2021	Best Editing	Julia Bloch	Nominated	
British Independent Film Awards	18 February 2021	Best Effects	Pedro Sabrosa and Stefano Pepin	Won	
British Independent Film Awards	18 February 2021	Best Music	Roque Baños	Nominated	
British Independent Film Awards	18 February 2021	Best Production Design	Jacqueline Abrahams	Won	
British Independent Film Awards	18 February 2021	Best Sound	Adrian Bell, Glenn Freemantle, Frank Kruse, Brendan Nicholson and Richard Pryke	Nominated	
NAACP Image Awards	27 March 2021	Outstanding International Motion Picture	His House	Nominated	
NAACP Image Awards	27 March 2021	Outstanding Breakthrough Creative (Motion Picture)	Remi Weekes	Nominated	
British Academy Film Awards	11 April 2021	Best Actress in a Leading Role	Wunmi Mosaku	Nominated	
British Academy Film Awards	11 April 2021	Outstanding Debut by a British Writer, Director or Producer	Remi Weekes	Won	
British Academy Film Awards	11 April 2021	Outstanding British Film	Ed King, Remi Weekes, Martin Gentles, Roy Lee	Nominated	
