= Sope Dirisu =

British actor (born 1991)

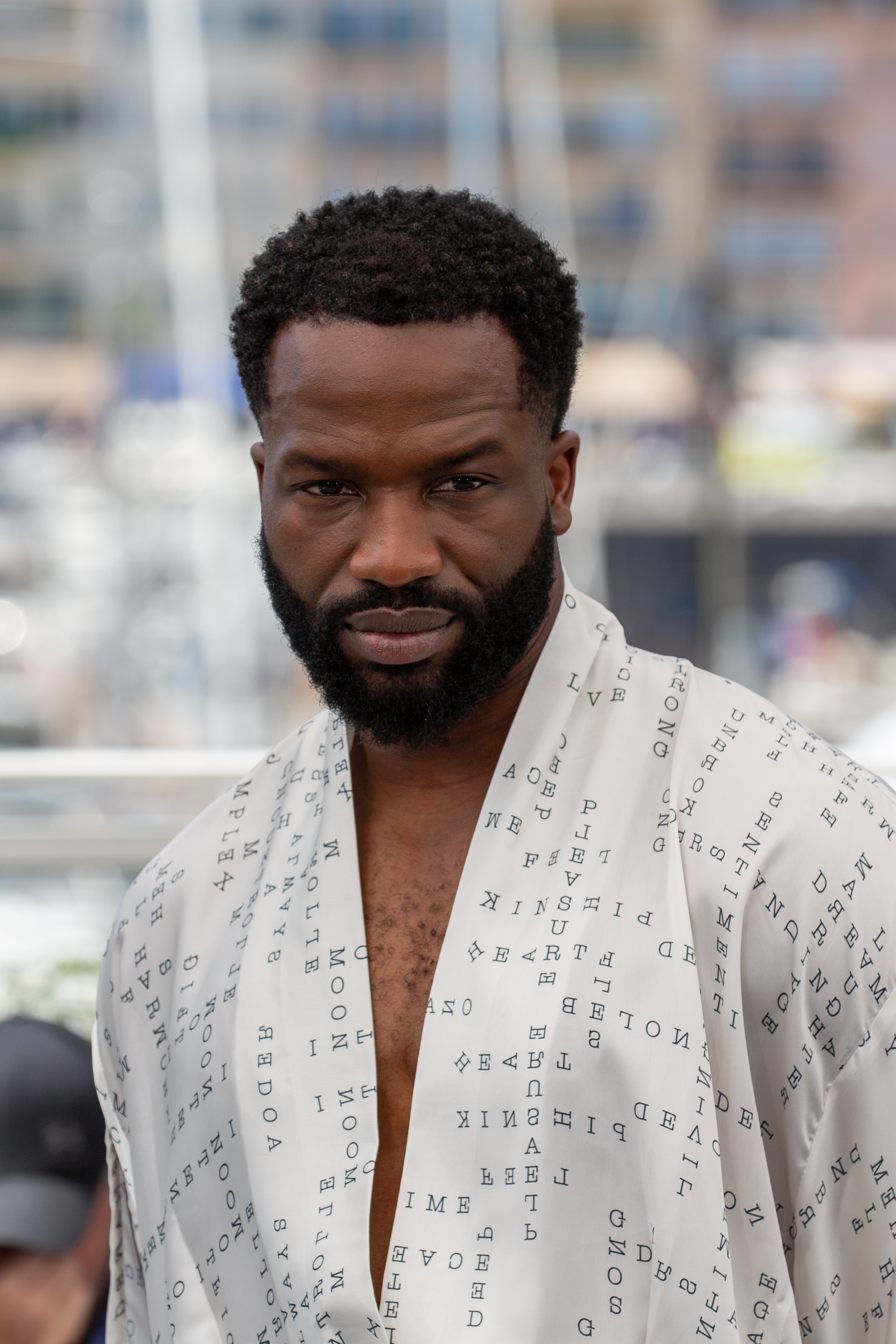
- Dirisu at the 2025 Cannes Film Festival
- Born: 1991 (age 34–35); London, England
- Occupation: Actor
- Years active: 2012–present
- Known for: Gangs of London; Mr. Malcolm's List

Sope Dirisu (Yoruba: Ṣọpẹ́ Dìrísù, [ʃɔ̄k͡pɛ́ dìɾísù]; born 1991) is a British actor. He made his film debut in 2016 with Sand Castle, Criminal, and The Huntsman: Winter's War. Since 2020, he has starred as Elliot Carter in the Sky Atlantic series Gangs of London, while in 2022, he starred as the titular character in the period drama film Mr. Malcolm's List.

== Early life and education ==
Dirisu was born in 1991 in London to Nigerian parents. His father studied history and his mother law before becoming preachers.

He was educated at Bedford Modern School, where he excelled at drama, and joined the National Youth Theatre in 2006.

He later studied Economics at the University of Birmingham. While studying there he played quarterback for the University of Birmingham Lions American Football team.

== Career ==
In 2012, Dirisu successfully auditioned for the Royal Shakespeare Company’s Open Stages Programme. His first stage role was as Pericles in Shakespeare’s Pericles, Prince of Tyre. After the Royal Shakespeare Company, Dirisu returned to the National Youth Theatre where he trained in the REP company programme for eight months.

He has subsequently acted in a number of television series including The Mill, Utopia, Humans, The Casual Vacancy, Siblings, and Undercover.

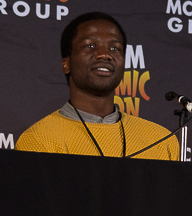
Dirisu at the 2015 London Comic Con

Dirisu appeared in three 2016 films, Criminal, The Huntsman: Winter's War, and Sand Castle. In 2016, he also appeared in "Nosedive", an episode of the anthology series Black Mirror.

Dirisu received a Commendation at the Ian Charleson Awards for his 2017 performance as Coriolanus in Coriolanus at the Royal Shakespeare Company.

He was nominated as Best Actor for the 2020 British Independent Film Awards for his role as Bol in the film His House.

In 2023, Dirisu played the role of Sean Donovan in the third season of the Apple TV series Slow Horses.

In 2025, Dirisu played the role of Wes in the Netflix series "Black Rabbit".

In the Full Cast audiobook recordings of Harry Potter, released by Audible, he voices the character of Sirius Black.

Dirisu will star alongside Nicole Beharie and John Douglas Thompson in the upcoming Netflix limited series adaptation All the Sinners Bleed, based on the S. A. Cosby novel of the same name.

== Filmography ==
=== Film ===
Year	Title	Role	Notes
2012	Lazarus Rising	Pvt. Maurice (voice)	Short film
2013	Circles	The Boy (C)	Short film
2016	Criminal	Fire Officer	
2016	The Huntsman: Winter's War	Tull	
2016	The Trip	James	Short film
2016	The Dead Sea	Emmanuel	Short film
2016	Motherland	Moussa Sidibé	Short film
2017	Sand Castle	Sgt. Cole	
2017	The Fight	Said	Short film
2017	A Battle in Waterloo	Coleman	Short film
2020	His House	Bol	
2021	Mothering Sunday	Donald	
2021	Silent Night	James	
2021	Tides	Tucker	Also released as The Colony
2022	Mr. Malcolm's List	Mr. Malcolm	
2023	Chasing the Night	Leon	Short film
2025	The Gorge	Jasper "J.D" Drake	
2025	My Father's Shadow	Folarin	Feature film
TBA	A Colt Is My Passport †	TBA	Post-production

=== Television ===
Year	Title	Role	Notes
2014	Utopia	Roy	Episode #2.4
2014	The Mill	Peter	6 episodes
2015	The Casual Vacancy	Young Doctor	3 episodes
2015–2018	Humans	Fred	8 episodes
2016	Black Mirror	Man in Prison	Episode: "Nosedive"
2016	Undercover	Michael Antwi	4 episodes
2016	Siblings	Zeff	Episode: "Golden Aunt"
2017	The Halcyon	Sonny Sullivan	8 episodes
2018	Next of Kin	DS Stanley Hart / DS Elliot Hart	5 episodes
2019	State of the Union	Giles	Episode: "Plaster Cast"
2020–2022	His Dark Materials	Sergi (voice)	2 episodes
2020–present	Gangs of London	Elliot Carter / Elliot Finch	24 episodes
2021	Foresight	Kwesi	Episode: "Digging"
2023	Tabby McTat	Tabby (voice)	Television film
2023	Slow Horses	Sean Donovan	6 episodes
2025	Black Rabbit	Wes	Miniseries
TBA	All the Sinners Bleed †	Titus Crown	Limited series

=== Audiobooks ===
Year	Title	Role	Notes
2026	Harry Potter and the Prisoner of Azkaban (Full-Cast Audio Edition)	Sirius Black	
2026	Harry Potter and the Goblet of Fire (Full-Cast Audio Edition)	Sirius Black	
2026	Harry Potter and the Order of the Phoenix (Full-Cast Audio Edition)	Sirius Black	
2026	Harry Potter and the Deathly Hallows (Full-Cast Audio Edition)	Sirius Black	

=== Stage ===
From 6 October to 3 December 2016, Dirisu played Muhammad Ali in One Night in Miami by Kemp Powers, at Donmar Warehouse in London, alongside David Ajala as Jim Brown, Arinzé Kene as Sam Cooke, and Francois Battiste as Malcolm X.

Other theatre includes The Whipping Man, Tory Boyz, Romeo and Juliet, Hamlet, Red Riding Hood, Our Days of Rage, Fallujah, and Pericles with the RSC.

Dirisu received a Commendation at the Ian Charleson Awards for his 2017 performance as Coriolanus in Coriolanus at the Royal Shakespeare Company.

== Awards and nominations ==
Award	Year	Category	Work	Result	Ref
British Independent Film Award	2020	Best Performance by an Actor	His House	Nominated	
British Academy Film Awards	2021	Rising Star Award	Himself	Nominated	
Critics' Choice Super Award	2021	Best Actor in a Horror Movie	His House	Nominated	
Gotham Independent Film Awards	2025	Best Lead Performance	My Father's Shadow	Won	
