= Sympathy for Delicious =

- Film poster
- Directed by: Mark Ruffalo
- Written by: Christopher Thornton
- Produced by: Mark Ruffalo; Matt Weaver; Andrea Sperling; Scott Prisand
- Starring: Christopher Thornton; Mark Ruffalo; Juliette Lewis; Laura Linney; Orlando Bloom
- Cinematography: Chris Norr
- Edited by: Pete Beaudreau
- Distributed by: Corner Store Entertainment; Super Crispy Entertainment
- Release date: January 23, 2010 (Sundance)
- Running time: 94 minutes
- Country: United States
- Language: English
- Box office: $13,826

Sympathy for Delicious is a 2010 American drama film, and the directorial debut of Mark Ruffalo. Filming took place in Los Angeles.

== Premise ==
A newly paralyzed disc jockey (Thornton) gets more than he bargained for when he seeks out the world of faith healing.

== Cast ==
- Christopher Thornton as "Delicious' Dean O'Dwyer
- Juliette Lewis as Ariel Lee
- Mark Ruffalo as Joe
- Laura Linney as Nina Hogue
- Orlando Bloom as The Stain
- Noah Emmerich as Rene Faubacher
- John Carroll Lynch as Healer
- Robert Wisdom as Prendell
- Dov Tiefenbach as Oogie
- Deantoni Parks as Chuck
- Sandra Seacat as Mrs. Matilda

== Awards ==
Ruffalo won the Special Jury Prize at the 2010 Sundance Film Festival, and was also nominated for the Grand Jury Prize.

== Production ==
Filming took place in Los Angeles, California, from 5 January to 28 February 2009.
