= Mr. Malcolm's List =

2022 American period drama film

- Theatrical release poster
- Directed by: Emma Holly Jones
- Screenplay by: Suzanne Allain
- Based on: Mr. Malcolm's List by Suzanne Allain
- Produced by: Laura Rister; Laura Lewis; Katie Holly; Emma Holly Jones
- Starring: Freida Pinto; Sope Dirisu; Oliver Jackson-Cohen; Ashley Park; Zawe Ashton; Theo James
- Cinematography: Tony Miller
- Edited by: Kate Hickey
- Music by: Amelia Warner
- Production companies: Ingenious Media; Fís Éireann/Screen Ireland; Refinery29; Untitled Entertainment; Rebelle Media; Blinder Films; Holly Films Production
- Distributed by: Bleecker Street (United States); Vertigo Releasing (United Kingdom); Universal Pictures (International)
- Release dates: July 1, 2022 (United States); August 26, 2022 (United Kingdom and Ireland)
- Running time: 117 minutes
- Countries: United Kingdom; Ireland; United States
- Languages: English; Japanese; Welsh; Korean
- Box office: $2 million

Mr. Malcolm's List is a 2022 historical drama film directed by Emma Holly Jones and written by Suzanne Allain, based on her novel of the same name. It stars Freida Pinto, Sope Dirisu, Oliver Jackson-Cohen, Ashley Park, Zawe Ashton, and Theo James.

The film follows a young woman in 1800s England who helps her friend get revenge on a suitor who rejected her for failing to meet a requirement on his list of qualifications for a bride.

The film was released in the United States and Canada on July 1, 2022, and later in the United Kingdom and Ireland on August 26, 2022.

== Plot ==
The beautiful Julia Thistlewaite attends the opera with the most eligible bachelor of the season, Mr. Jeremy Malcolm. After she fails to impress him, she is widely mocked in a caricature. Julia employs her cousin, the feckless Lord Cassidy, to see what she has done to offend Mr. Malcolm. Malcolm reveals to him that he has a list of requirements for a wife that she did not meet.

Cassidy tells this to Julia, who is offended. She then decides to invite her friend, Selina Dalton, a vicar's daughter, to London to try and exact revenge on Mr. Malcolm. Julia greatly exaggerates Malcolm's rejection of her and trains her reluctant friend to act as the perfect potential bride, so she can later present him with a similar list to reject him.

On the night she is to meet Malcolm, Selina accidentally runs into him in the orangery. There, they debate philosophy and are immediately attracted to one another. When they are formally introduced, Malcolm invites Selina to the museum with him, where he explains that he and Julia had a very weak connection.

While there, the two run into Captain Ossory, with whom Selina was previously acquainted, having served as his aunt's companion in Bath. The following day, he invites her to walk with him. Then Ossory formally announces his intention to court Selina, as his aunt's final letter to him expresses her desire for the two of them to be matched.

Malcolm does not stop his pursuit of Selina, who, aided by Julia's machinations, continues to present as his perfect woman. When the two women accidentally run into Selina's vulgar cousin Gertie Covington, Julia claims her as her relation. Malcolm later privately tells Selina he is glad she is not related to someone so crass, and Selina is upset by the news. When Malcolm learns the truth, he privately apologizes to Selina and even extends an invitation to Gertie to join him and the rest of the party at his country estate, for a masquerade ball.

Julia decides that Malcolm is suitably in love with Selina and decides it is time for her to reject him. However, Selina reveals she no longer wants to proceed with the plan, as she believes Malcolm is honorable and has no intention of hurting Julia. Julia is livid and believes Selina only changed her mind after seeing how wealthy Malcolm is.

At the masquerade, where Malcolm plans to propose to Selina, Julia has her maid call Selina away and lock her in a room. Then she sends a message to Malcolm to meet him in secret, posing as Selina. When he proposes, Julia rejects him with a similar list to his and runs away, only to be immediately found out by Selina, Malcolm, and Ossory. Julia reveals Malcolm's rejection still hurts her and that Selina was a participant in her scheme, causing Malcolm to become heartbroken and reject Selina as well.

The following day, a guilt-ridden Julia tries another scheme to reunite Malcolm and Selina but is dissuaded by Ossory, who confesses he has fallen in love with her. Malcolm and Selina later are led to be alone in the garden with unsigned notes, so Malcolm accuses Selina of trying to trap him in an engagement. Infuriated, she wishes him luck with his list and remarks that he does not deserve to be loved.

After Julia apologizes, Selina decides to leave for home. As she does, Malcolm's mother blames her son for Selina's departure, revealing that she was the one who plotted to get the two alone in the garden. Malcolm chases after Selina and gives her a new list of everything he is looking for in a wife, the sole line reading "Selina Dalton". He proposes and she accepts.

== Cast ==
- Freida Pinto as Selina Dalton
- Sope Dirisu as Mr. Jeremy Malcolm
- Oliver Jackson-Cohen as Lord Cassidy
- Ashley Park as Gertie Covington
- Zawe Ashton as Julia Thistlewaite
- Theo James as Captain Henry Ossory
- Divian Ladwa as John
- Naoko Mori as Mrs. Thistlewaite
- Sophie Vavasseur as Lady Gwyneth Amberton
- Sianad Gregory as Molly
- Doña Croll as Lady Kilbourne
- Paul Tylak as Mr. Dalton
- Dawn Bradfield as Mrs. Dalton

== Production ==
Suzanne Allain self-published her novel Mr. Malcolm's List in 2009 and subsequently adapted it into a script. The script was discovered by filmmaker Emma Holly Jones when The Black List did a podcast script reading of the script submitted through the website in 2015. Jones pursued the rights and then brought on producer Laura Rister and subsequently Laura Lewis to produce the feature film adaptation. The team decided to make a short film, as an overture to the feature version and partnered with Vice Studios' Refinery29 and their Shatterbox short film series for female filmmakers to make the short. It was shot in October 2018, in London, and was released online on February 14, 2019 and it has had over 2 million views. It stars Gemma Chan, Sope Dirisu, Oliver Jackson-Cohen, and Freida Pinto. Based on its success, Suzanne's novel was published in 2020 by Berkley Press, and the feature film was financed. The team partnered with producer Katie Holly and her Blinder Films to shoot in Ireland.

Filming began in March 2021 in Ireland, with Zawe Ashton, Theo James, and Ashley Park joining the cast. Bleecker Street acquired the US distribution rights to the film, while Universal Pictures acquired the international distribution rights.

== Release ==
The film was released on July 1, 2022, in the United States by Bleecker Street and in Canada by levelFILM and was later released in the United Kingdom on August 26, 2022, by Vertigo Releasing. Universal Pictures released the film internationally.

The film was released to VOD platforms on July 21, 2022, by Bleecker Street, followed by a Blu-ray and DVD release on August 23, 2022.

== Reception ==
=== Box office ===
Mr. Malcolm's List grossed $1.9 million in North America and $138,789 in other territories for a worldwide total of $2 million. In the United States and Canada, the film made $1 million over the four-day Independence Day weekend, finishing seventh. The film dropped out of the top nine at the box office in its second weekend, grossing $255,116 with a $241 average revenue.

=== Critical response ===
On the review aggregator website Rotten Tomatoes, 82% of 112 reviews are positive, with an average rating of 6.5/10. The critical consensus reads, "Mr. Malcolm's List references countless Regency romps without particularly distinguishing itself from the pack, but it gently entertains as a diversely-cast ode to Jane Austen's works. On Metacritic, the film has an average score of 65 out of 100 based on 31 critic reviews, indicating "generally favorable reviews".
