= Runner (2026 American film) =

American action film

- Theatrical release poster
- Directed by: Scott Waugh
- Written by: Miles Hubley; Tommy White
- Produced by: Alan Ritchson; Todd Garner; Mark Fasano; Jeffrey Greenstein
- Starring: Alan Ritchson; Owen Wilson; Rodrigo Santoro
- Cinematography: Lorenzo Senatore
- Edited by: Matt Villa
- Music by: Charlie Nguyen Kim
- Production companies: 2521 Entertainment; Broken Road Productions; Nickel City Pictures; A Higher Standard; Industry Entertainment
- Distributed by: Angel Studios
- Release date: September 11, 2026
- Running time: 98 minutes
- Country: United States
- Language: English
- Budget: $35–45 million
- Box office: $19 million

Runner is a 2026 American action comedy film directed by Scott Waugh and written by Miles Hubley and Tommy White. Starring Alan Ritchson and Owen Wilson, the film follows a former soldier and a medical courier who must deliver a rare organ to a terminally ill girl while being pursued by the cartel.

The film was theatrically released on September 11, 2026 by Angel Studios. It received generally positive reviews from critics, with praise for the action sequences and Ritchson and Wilson's performances, but criticism towards the story.

== Plot ==
In Brisbane, Australia former Army Special Forces operative Hank Malone works as a "runner", who transports legal and illegal items for clients. After acquiring an exotic parrot from a job gone wrong, Hank is contacted by his boss, Iggy, who instructs him to transport a package from an airport. At the airport, Hank meets Ben Bishop. On Ben's insistence, Hank takes him and the package—a transplant liver—to a hospital.

On the way to the hospital, Hank calls Iggy. Hank ignores Iggy's fearful demands that the liver be taken straight to the drop-off point. Realizing they have been followed, Hank questions Ben, and Ben reveals that the liver's donor and recipient both have Rh Null, an extremely rare blood type. Hank asks how the organ was obtained, and Ben replies that it is from a victim of the Colombian cartel. The two are chased by cartel members, who are in pursuit of the liver. After a series of vehicular chases, Iggy calls Hank to beg for the liver. Hank refuses, as the liver is intended for a young girl named Ellie, and the cartel kills Iggy. During the chase to escape, Hank's car is destroyed.

Hank and Ben escape the cartel and go to the house of Hank's ex-wife, Monica. Monica gives them a bike to get to her car, and Hank gives Monica the exotic parrot as thanks. While biking to the car, Hank reveals that he is a recovering alcoholic whose marriage to Monica ended after their daughter, Isabel, died of leukemia. Isabel had been obsessed with France, leading to Hank trying to learn the language. They are ambushed upon arriving at the car, resulting in Ben being kidnapped and the cooler being taken. Before being taken away, Ben deliberately drops his phone, giving Hank a way to track the organ cooler and the liver.

Ben is taken to a remote house and interrogated by Damian Zaldívar, a cartel leader. Damian reveals that the liver is for his dying mother. Suddenly, Hank breaks into the building and rescues Ben, who shoots Damian in the chaos. As they speed away, they discover that Ben and the organ cooler have been shot. They stop by a gas station and buy ice to cool the liver, then contact emergency services while Ben gives Hank the cooler's code. They are picked up by an ambulance but are pursued by the cartel, and Ben dies from his gunshot wound.

At the hospital, Hank is informed that the surgery may be compromised. Hank tells Kate, Ellie's mother, to watch for cartel members. However, the insider is revealed to be Ellie's nurse Julie, whose brother was kidnapped by the cartel to perform the surgery on Damian's mother. Damian arrives, shooting a stream of bullets that kill Julie, and takes the cooler. Hank fights Damian, devastating much of the hospital wing and ending with Hank killing Damian before collapsing from his injuries.

While recovering, Hank visits Ellie, whose surgery was a success, at the hospital. Sometime later, Hank takes a vacation to Paris to honor Isabel.

== Cast ==
- Alan Ritchson as Hank Malone
- Owen Wilson as Ben Bishop
- Rodrigo Santoro as Damian Zaldívar
- Leila George as Kate Baker
- Kate Box as Dr. Ainsley
- Peta Sergeant as Nurse Julie
- Cecilia Toussaint as Donna Zaldívar
- Geraldine Hakewill as Monica
- Goran D. Kleut as Luke Robbie
- Scarlett Crabtree as Ellie
- Gyton Grantley as Iggy
- Sullivan Stapleton as Josh
- Kate Jenkinson as bird lady

== Production ==
The film is written by Miles Hubley and Tommy White and was included in the 2023 "Black List" of the most-liked unproduced screenplays. In October 2024, Scott Waugh was confirmed as director with Alan Ritchson in the lead role. Producers on the project included: Todd Garner (Broken Road Productions), Dan Spilo (Industry Entertainment), Mark Fasano (Nickel City Pictures), Jeffrey Greenstein (A Higher Standard), and Ritchson himself. Owen Wilson joined the cast in February 2025. In April 2025, Rodrigo Santoro, Leila George, Adriana Barraza, Sullivan Stapleton, Peta Sergeant, Geraldine Hakewill, and Goran D. Kleut joined the cast.

Principal photography began in April 2025, in Australia. Spilo was removed as a producer following a HR investigation into alleged inappropriate behaviour that included bullying and yelling at crew. In May 2025, Ritchson shared that production had wrapped on the film.

== Release ==
Runner was released in the United States by Angel Studios on September 11, 2026.

== Reception ==
=== Box office ===
In the United States and Canada, Runner was released alongside Practical Magic 2, Hope, The Uprising, and Oasis: Don't Look Back in Anger, and was projected to gross around $5 million from 2,568 theaters in its opening weekend. It ended up debuting to $6.5 million, finishing in fourth.

=== Critical response ===
On the review aggregator website Rotten Tomatoes, 78% of 64 critics' reviews are positive, with an average rating of 6.1/10. The website's consensus reads: "Fast and gleefully over-the-top, Runner makes the most of Alan Ritchson and Owen Wilson's winning chemistry to deliver crowd-pleasing action and humor with plenty of heart." Metacritic, which uses a weighted average, assigned the film a score of 55 out of 100, based on 15 critics, indicating "mixed or average" reviews. Audiences polled by CinemaScore gave the film an average grade of "A-" on an A+ to F scale.
