= My Darkest Prayer =

2018 novel by S. A. Cosby

- Author: S. A. Cosby
- Genre: Southern noir
- Published: 2018

My Darkest Prayer is a 2018 mystery thriller novel by S. A. Cosby. My Darkest Prayer is Cosby's debut novel. It was not met with widespread critical attention at the time of its original publication. It was re-published in 2022, after Cosby had become successful due to his subsequent novels.

== Plot summary ==
Nathan Waymaker is a former sheriff's deputy and retired US Marine who now works at a funeral home in rural Virginia. After the suspicious death of Reverend Esau Watkins is ignored by local police, Nathan decides to investigate the death himself.

== Reception ==
After the novel's re-issue in 2022, it was widely praised by critics. Lorraine Berry of the Los Angeles Times, described Cosby was "one of the foremost writers of Southern noir". Berry praised Nathan's characterization, noting his brutal physicality and complex conflicts with race and injustice. Some reviewers considered the novel to be slightly inferior to Cosby's later novels. Sandra Hoover of Mystery & Suspense called it "a brilliant piece of work plot wise if you can get past the reiteration of violence, profanity and street references to well-endowed women." In CrimeSpree Magazine, Dan Malmon "a prime example of economy in storytelling without sacrificing character or story."
