= King of Ashes (novel) =

2025 novel by S. A. Cosby

- First edition hardcover
- Author: S. A. Cosby
- Cover artist: Pete Garceau
- Language: English
- Genre: Southern Gothic
- Publisher: Flatiron Books
- Publication date: October 6, 2025
- Publication place: United States
- Pages: 352
- ISBN: 9781250832078

King of Ashes is a Southern Gothic novel by American author S. A. Cosby. It was published by Flatiron Books on October 6, 2025. An audiobook edition narrated by Adam Lazarre-White was released concurrently with the ebook and hardcover editions.

== Background ==
Cosby based the fictional town of Jefferson Run on several cities in the American South that experience a rise in crime after the departure of industry. Its themes of family, loyalty, and organized crime were influenced by The Godfather.

== Synopsis ==
Roman Carruthers is a financial advisor living in Atlanta who returns to his hometown of Jefferson Run, Virginia when his father is left in a coma following a car crash. There, he finds his sister, Neveah, exhausted and embittered from being left with the responsibility of managing the family crematorium, while his brother, Dante, is struggling with addiction. Within a few hours, Roman finds out that the crash was caused by a drug gang—the Black Baron Boys led by siblings Torrent and Tranquil Gilchrist—as revenge against Dante, who is three weeks late in paying back a $300,000 debt to them. Roman offers his financial expertise to the gang in order to save his family, setting him down a path of violence. Meanwhile, Neveah reinvestigates the unsolved nineteen-year-old disappearance of their mother, which the town suspects their father of being responsible for.

== Reception ==
Time listed it among their 100 Must-Read Books of 2025. It was featured on Amazon's Best Books of 2025. It was nominated for a Goodreads Choice Award in the categories of Readers' Favorite Mystery & Thriller and Readers' Favorite Audiobook. It was also nominated for a Barry Award for Best Mystery. It was longlisted for a PEN/Faulkner Award for Fiction and an Aspen Words Literary Prize. The audiobook was nominated for an ITW Thriller Award for Best Audiobook and an Audie Award for Audiobook of the Year.

Kirkus Reviews called the novel "tense" and praised its "lofty" philosophizing for "freshening the genre", but stated that the plot "sometimes wobbles" with the romance between Roman and Torrent's half-sister. Publishers Weekly called Roman's transition into becoming an aspiring crime boss "almost too smooth", his growing appetite for violence "overplayed and undermotivated", and the novel's nihilism "more suffocating than powerful", but praised its "evocative" scene-setting and its "richly detailed" portraits of rural black family life. Neely Tucker of The Washington Post called the novel as "dark, riveting and accomplished" as Cosby's previous works, but said that the Black Baron Boys were not "that interesting" and called Dante "irritating". Chanelle Benz called the novel "propulsive" and "powerful" in her review for The New York Times, praising how Cosby "flawlessly" conjures Jefferson Run as a poverty-stricken Southern city and calling Roman "a character of Shakespearean proportions". Roxane Gay gave it a four star review on Goodreads, calling it "one hell of a thrilling read", but noted that a few elements felt "a bit repetitive". Former Amazon editor Vanessa Cronin called it "riveting", and described Cosby as "one of the greatest American crime writers ever to do it."
