= Jennifer Stanley =

American mystery novelist

- Born: 1970 (age 55–56); United States
- Education: Franklin and Marshall (B); West Chester University (MA); North Carolina Central
- Occupation: Novelist
- Writing career
- Pen name: Ellery Adams
- Language: English
- Genre: Mystery fiction
- Notable works: The Secret, Book & Scone Society
- Website: Official website

Jennifer Stanley (born 1970) is an American mystery fiction novelist. She also writes under the name Ellery Adams.

== Biography ==
Stanley is from Long Island, New York.

She received a bachelor's degree from Franklin and Marshall College. She has a Master of Arts from West Chester University and a master of library and information science from North Carolina Central University. Stanley began her writing career when she moved from Durham, North Carolina to Richmond, Virginia. Her pen name was inspired by one of her favorite authors, Ellery Queen.

The Secret, Book & Scone Society was a New York Times best seller.

Stanley is married and has two children.

== Selected works ==
=== As Ellery Adams ===
==== The Secret, Book & Scone Society ====
- —— (2017). The Secret, Book & Scone Society. Kensington. ISBN 9781496712370.
- —— (2018). The Whispered Word. Kensington.
- —— (2020). The Book of Candlelight. Kensington. ISBN 9781496712431.
- —— (2021). Ink and Shadows. Kensington. ISBN 9781496726414.
- —— (2022). The Vanishing Type. Kensington. ISBN 9781496726445.
- —— (2023). Paper Cuts. Kensington Cozies. ISBN 9781496726476.
- —— (2024). The Little Lost Library. Kensington Cozies. ISBN 9781496743794.

==== The Book Retreat Mysteries ====
- —— (2014). Murder in the Mystery Suite. Berkley. ISBN 9780425265598.
- —— (2015). Murder in the Paperback Parlor. Berkley. ISBN 9780425265604.
- —— (2016). Murder in the Secret Garden. Berkley. ISBN 9780425265611.
- —— (2018). Murder in the Locked Library. Kensington. ISBN 9781496715630.
- —— (2019). Murder in the Reading Room. Kensington. ISBN 9781496715654.
- —— (2020). Murder in the Storybook Cottage. Kensington. ISBN 9781496715678.
- —— (2022). Murder on the Poet's Walk. Kensington. ISBN 9781496729484.

==== Charmed Pie Shoppe Mysteries ====
- —— (2012). Pies and Prejudice. Berkley. ISBN 9780425251409.
- —— (2013). Peach Pies and Alibis. Berkley. ISBN 9780425251997.
- —— (2014). Pecan Pies and Homicides. Berkley. ISBN 9780425252413.
- —— (2015). Lemon Pies and Little White Lies. Berkley. ISBN 9780425276020.
- —— (2016). Breach of Crust. Berkley. ISBN 9780425276037.

=== As Jennifer Stanley ===
- Stirring Up Strife (Minotaur, 2009)

=== As J. B. Stanley ===
- Stiffs & Swine (Midnight Ink/Llellyn, 2008) ISBN 978-0-7387-1267-3
- Chili Con Corpses (Midnight Ink/Llewellyn, 2008) ISBN 978-0-7387-1259-8
- The Battered Body (Midnight Ink/Llewellyn, 2009) ISBN 978-0-7387-1472-1
- Black Beans & Vice (Midnight Ink/Llewellyn, 2010) ISBN 978-0-7387-1954-2
