= Russell Emanuel =

British entrepreneur and musician

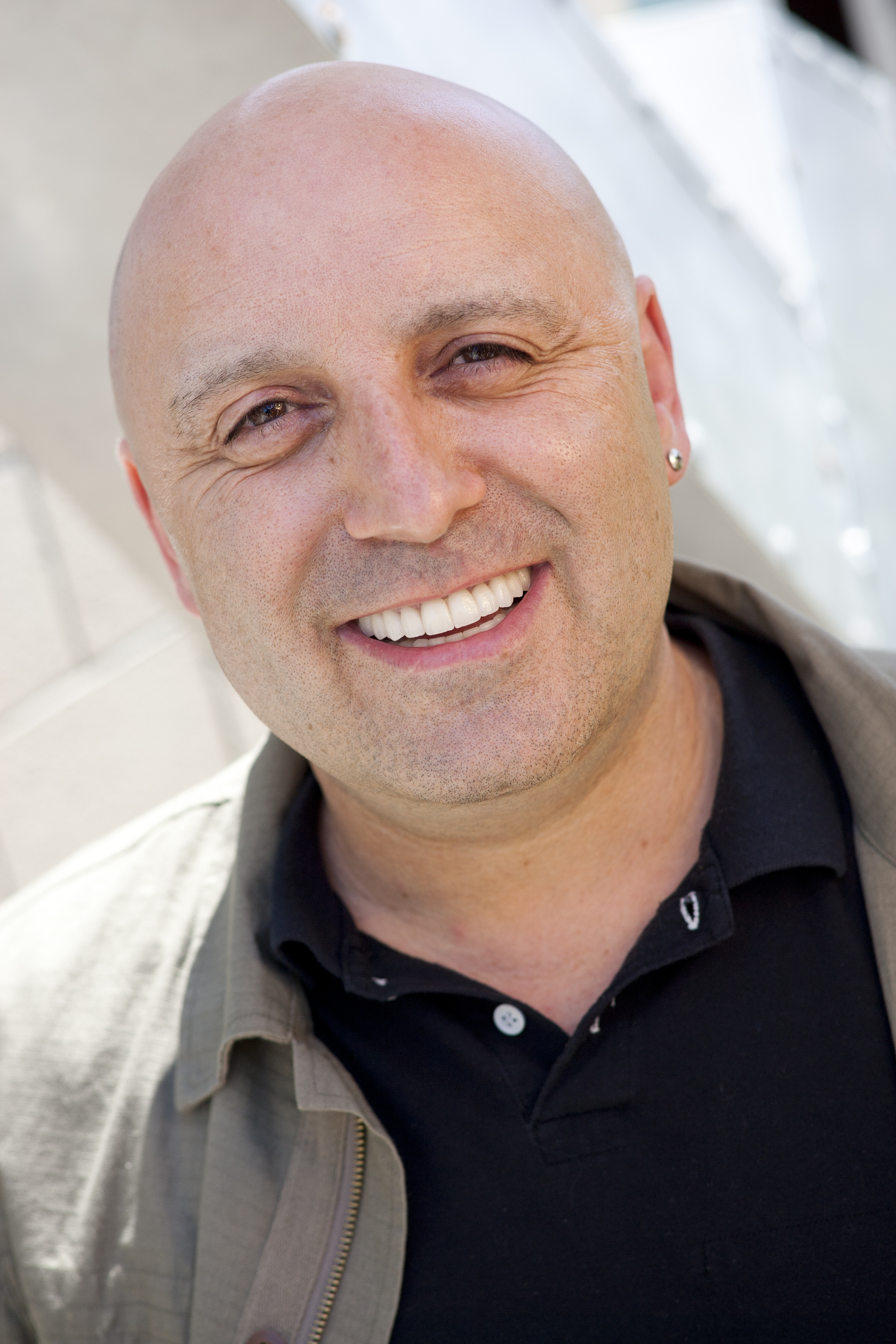
- Born: London, England
- Citizenship: English
- Occupations: CEO, Extreme Music
- Years active: 1980–present
- Website: extrememusic.com

Russell Emanuel is a British entrepreneur, musician, and producer. He is the co-founder, president, and CEO of Extreme Music, which creates and licenses music for use in television, film, advertising, and online media, and the president and CEO of Bleeding Fingers Custom Music Shop, a scoring, composition, and music production company co-founded with Hans Zimmer and Steve Kofsky.

== Early life ==
Emanuel was born in London to Maureen Emanuel and Edward Potok, a Polish survivor of World War II. He grew up in a working-class neighbourhood in North London, and began to play the guitar when he was a child. As a teenager, Emanuel played in bands and bought his first electric guitar with money earned from a newspaper delivery route. He left high school at 15 and remained in London, where he became involved in the English punk scene of the late 1970s.

== Career ==
After leaving secondary school, Emanuel got a job in the mailroom at the BBC. Later, he was a studio assistant at MCA Music Publishing as well as a tape operator and eventually a sound engineer at studios including Abbey Road. During the same time period, he played bass in a punk band, Class Ties, who released an album on EMI in 1981. In the mid-1980s, he began to manage bands including The Jam and Stiff Little Fingers, with whom he co-wrote several songs, produced and engineered.

Emanuel was introduced to production music when he was hired by Bruton Music, a production music library. Although he worked in the mailroom, he and a friend, Warren Bennett, were asked to record an album for the library. Bennett's father, Brian Bennett who had played with The Shadows and Cliff Richard, served as the album's producer. Commenting on the aesthetic of production music of the time, Emanuel said: "Bruton was one of the first production music libraries, and it was all on vinyl back then, and with a few exceptions tended to be full of people knocking out soundalikes of current hits. They'd change the chord structure round a bit and that would be it." Over the next fifteen years, Emanuel and Bennett received royalty payments for the Bruton soundalike album.

Emanuel was subsequently hired by MatchMusic, a small music library, and began to compose production music with Stiff Little Fingers drummer Dolph Taylor. In addition to writing while on tour with portable equipment, Emanuel and Taylor wrote together in a small MIDI studio in Taylor's London flat. With significant success, Taylor joined the staff of Match Music, and ultimately he and Emanuel ran the company. Rather than writing and recording the "traditional old-school emulations," Emanuel and Taylor approached commercial artists, many of whom they already knew, to create tracks with high production values. They subsequently developed the "Extreme Music" series for Match, creating production music by established artists. In 1997, when MatchMusic was sold to BMG, Emanuel and Taylor decided to found their own library, naming the company Extreme Music. It was pitched as a "production music company that would up the industry ante by using professional recording equipment and top-notch musicians" and financed through a $100,000 investment from Mark Levinson, a previous owner of Palan Music,

Extreme Music was positioned to reflect the punk rock ethos of its founders; for example, they mailed condoms to 1,000 music industry executives with packaging that read "Extreme Music: The Only Safe Thing You'll Ever Get From Us." With a focus on production, they intentionally limited the size of the catalogue, "upping the industry ante by using professional recording studios and top-notch musicians." Through keeping the library's emphasis on quality over quantity, they streamlined the process of selecting music for advertising agencies and music supervisors, eventually building one of the most profitable production music libraries in the UK. In August 2005 it was bought by Viacom for $45.1 million, and in 2008 it was acquired by Sony/ATV Music Publishing. The terms of the sale were not disclosed.

Extreme Music remains based in London. In 2005 it expanded to include a production facility in Santa Monica, California, United States. Additional offices were opened globally, and as of 2016, Extreme had built a library which contained approximately 15,000 original copyrights. Noting its size and the impact of using only high-quality music in the library, Emanuel said: “We’re very surgical about what we put in the catalog,” he says. “Our biggest competition, who we outperform, have a million copyrights.”

In August 2013, Extreme partnered with composer Hans Zimmer and his business partner, Steve Kofsky, to found Bleeding Fingers Custom Music Shop, a joint venture. It focuses on creating original music for use in light television drama, documentaries, animated features, reality television and film scores. Emanuel serves as the company's president and CEO. In 2017, Emanuel produced the track "Ocean (Bloom)" (stylised "ocean (bloom)"), a Zimmer and Radiohead collaboration for the BBC's Blue Planet II.
