= Hollywood East =

Film Industry in the Northeastern United States

Hollywood East is a term for the multiple efforts to build film industry agglomerations on the East Coast of the United States. Recently, the term has been applied to the growing film industry in New England, particularly in Massachusetts and Connecticut, that served as home to the production of over 140 major motion pictures and television series between 2000 and 2013. It is a reference to Hollywood, California, the center of the American film industry, located on the west coast of the United States. The term as used in New England was popularized in the press in 2007 as film and television productions migrated to the east coast to take advantage of the region's scenery, culture, character, and tax incentives put in place by several state governments.

== History ==
=== Orlando, Florida ===
Hollywood East was a term originally used by local press in Orlando, Florida in anticipation of the opening of Disney-MGM Studios (now Disney's Hollywood Studios) in 1989 and Universal Studios Florida in 1990. While founded as production studios, they are now predominantly theme parks. Nickelodeon Studios operated within Universal Studios Florida from 1990 to 2005 and at one time employed 400 people, making it the largest production studio in Florida.

The collapse of the Florida film industry has been attributed to multiple factors. Local talent was limited, and flying in cast and crew from out of state proved costly. Although a right-to-work state, Florida productions shot on film stock were regulated by the International Alliance of Theatrical Stage Employees (IATSE). IATSE organized a union strike at Nickelodeon Studios in 1997, which led Nickelodeon to move production of its scripted shows elsewhere. The 2012 bankruptcy of Digital Domain resulted in the closure of its tax-subsidized Florida studio. Americans for Prosperity then led a successful campaign to eliminate tax incentives for filming within the state in 2016.

=== New England ===
==== History of film in New England ====
New England, specifically Boston, played a prominent role in the dawn of the film industry at the turn of the 20th century. After Thomas Edison's Vitascope projector was debuted in a commercial setting in New York City on April 23, 1896, it was soon thereafter debuted in Boston by Benjamin Franklin Keith on May 18, 1896, at Keith's theater on 547 Washington street.

The technology received rave reviews from local media, with the Boston Herald writing, "The Vitascope is going to be the greatest drawing card of the season. Its possibilities are unlimited. Just think what it means. The scenes shown are full of life and action, simply lacking in vocalization. To describe the enthusiasm aroused would be impossible."

As motion pictures grew in popularity, so did the local and regional film production community. Filmmakers during this time period typically created short films based on either real life or based on stories or entertainment. Roxbury, Massachusetts born G.W. "Billy" Bitzer rose to prominence during this early age of motion pictures, and created two pictures set in Boston: Seeing Boston in 1905, a picture consisting of a series of scenes from Boston, and Midwinter Bathing, L Street Bath, Boston, also in 1905. These two pictures are thought to be two of the first ever shot in Boston.

As motion picture production evolved, so did its themes. Shortly after the silent shorts, filmmakers began adapting novels to the screen. Adaptation material in New England was especially rich with so many well-known novels being based there. House of the Seven Gables and The Scarlet Letter are two such novels based in New England and adapted into motion pictures, and two films that played a role in shaping the cinematic themes that would become part of New England film's identity for the entirety of the 20th century.

According moving picture archives Northeast Historic Film (NHF), these themes include Development of Yankee Characters, Smalltown Life Contrasted with city Values, Seafaring Tales, Family Secrets, and Haunted New England. These themes, rooted in centuries of New England culture, are complemented by the region's diverse natural landscape and architecture, from the Atlantic Ocean and brilliant fall foliage to church steeples and skyscrapers.

After the motion picture's introduction to New England in the late 1800s, the region saw a boom in film production in the 1930s and 1940s due to the spread of talking pictures or "talkies." Classic movies set in Boston from this era include Captains Courageous (1937), Boomerang (1947), Lost Boundaries (1949) and Our Town (1940). The number of movies produced in Boston between the 1950s and 1980s averaged 10 per decade, including box office hits Boston Strangler (1968) and Jaws (1975), until the 1990s when film production in the region exploded thanks to new and improved filming infrastructure. This upward trend continued in the 2000s, due in large part to tax incentive programs put in place by regional governments to attract filmmakers and production companies. One such example is the Massachusetts Tax Incentive program. Many television series were also filmed in New England during the 20th century, the most well-known of them being Cheers, Ally McBeal, Boston Legal, and Sabrina the Teenage Witch.

All in all, 352 TV series and films have been produced in Boston since 1900, with a number of them winning Academy Awards: Good Will Hunting (1997), Jaws, (1975), The Departed (2006), The Fighter (2010). The area has also produced many film and television stars, including but not limited to Ben Affleck, Matt Damon, Amy Poehler, Elizabeth Banks, Steve Carell, Ruth Gordon, John Krasinski, Edward Norton, Mark Wahlberg, and Matthew Perry. A full list can be found here, and a listing of notable films and television series produced in the area here.

==== Recent developments ====
In 2008, the name Hollywood East was used to brand Plymouth Rock Studios, a proposed movie studio that was to be built in Plymouth, Massachusetts before funding failed to materialize in 2009. More recently, the phrase has resurfaced thanks in part to the opening of New England Studios.

== Facilities ==
=== Orlando, Florida ===
Multiple efforts attempted to build functioning studios:

- Universal Studios Florida housed multiple live-action productions, including Nickelodeon Studios game shows and family sitcoms
- Disney/MGM Studios housed multiple live-action productions, as well as Walt Disney Feature Animation Florida.

While the amusement parks remain, the studios are rarely used for film production.

=== New England ===
When the film industry began shooting films in New England with frequency in the early 2000s, old warehouses and office buildings were used for filming due to a lack of infrastructure in the region, leading to several groups of developers coming forward with plans to build full service studios.

==== New England Studios ====
In November 2013, New England Studios (NEStudios) opened its 72,000 sq. foot, $41 million film studio in Devens, Massachusetts after the failure of Plymouth Rock Studios and Southfield Studios. Four 18,000-sq. ft. sound stages anchor the full-service television and film facility. NEStudio's technical capabilities include nailable floors, aerial catwalks, elephant doors, as well as office space for staff and dressing rooms for actors.

==== Failed proposals ====
===== Plymouth Rock Studios =====
Plymouth Rock Studios was a proposed film studio that was to be located in Plymouth, Massachusetts. The studios were conceived in 2006 when David Kirkpatrick, a former head of Paramount Motion Pictures, announced plans to build a $500 million studio, with 14 sound stages, an office building, post-production facilities, a hotel, restaurants, theater, visitors center and retail space. Plymouth Rock Studios began receiving considerable regional attention after passing their Plymouth Town Meeting vote in October 2008 and announcing a partnership with MIT Media Lab in November 2008 that was featured in the New York Times. The partnership was described as "a fusion between technology and the arts" that the studio and Massachusetts Institute of Technology believe will come to define Hollywood East as a movement.

However, before groundbreaking could begin as planned in late 2009, the state of Massachusetts denied Plymouth Rock's request for $50 million in state funding that would have been used to pay for road and sewer work. Around this same time, the project's co-founders missed the deadline to purchase the Waverly Oaks golf course that occupied the land targeted for studio construction.

In a final attempt at funding, Kirkpatrick announced that the project had reached a deal with Prosperity International of Orlando, FL, a company headed by Michael Burgess, to secure $500 million in funding. Plymouth Rock studios gave $3.5 million to Burgess as collateral in return for Burgess promising to secure the loan, however, Burgess never secured the loan and never returned the deposit afterwards. In 2011, Michael Burgess was sentenced to 15 years in prison on 42 counts of wire fraud and conspiracy.

===== Southfield Studios =====
Around the same time that Plymouth Rock Studios was beginning to experience financial difficulties, the Los Angeles based International Studio Group proposed another movie studio to be based in Massachusetts called Southfield Studios. These studios were to be built in Weymouth, Massachusetts on the former naval base there just 12 miles south of Boston. The studios were to cost $147 million and power the 600,000 square feet complex that could host all types of media production companies, including movies, television, video games, live broadcasts, satellite simulcasts, music videos and commercials. However, ground was never broken and today Southfield is home to a residential community.

== Government incentives ==
=== Florida ===
For decades, Florida provided considerable tax incentives to attract film production. However, after the 2012 bankruptcy of Digital Domain resulted in the closure of studios largely subsidized by state and local governments, Florida ceased its state film tax incentives program.

=== Massachusetts ===
The Commonwealth of Massachusetts has incentivized the film industry to create projects in Massachusetts through an attractive tax credit law. For film production companies doing business in Massachusetts, these tax incentives include Sales & Use Tax Exemption, Transferable 25% Payroll Credit, and a Transferable 25% Production Expense Credit.

For productions created in Massachusetts between calendar years 2006 and 2011, approximately $326.5 million in total film tax credits were generated by 676 individual productions, resulting in $185.8 million in net new spending in the Massachusetts economy. In 2011 alone, the state of Massachusetts generated $375 million in economic output through the $38 million worth of tax incentives that were handed out to the film industry, or in other words, generated $10 worth of in-state spending for every $1 awarded through tax credits. This resulted in 2,220 Full Time Equivalent jobs across all industries in Massachusetts in 2011.

According to the Massachusetts Film Office, parties eligible for the tax credit include Feature-length film, video, or digital media projects (narrative or documentary);TV series (not to exceed 27 episodes); and Commercials (multiple commercials for one client may be aggregated). All projects must spend at least $50,000 and be made in part or whole in Massachusetts to be eligible for the credit.

=== MA Film Office ===
The Massachusetts Film Office is the official state agency charged with assisting movie-making, television and commercial production in Massachusetts. The organization's website serves as a resource for productions interested in learning about filming in Massachusetts by providing a breakdown of the state's tax incentives, a filmography of films and TV series shot in the state, a directory of filming locations and more.
