= Razorblade Tears =

2021 novel by S. A. Cosby

- First edition cover
- Author: S.A. Cosby
- Language: English
- Genre: Crime; thriller
- Publisher: Flatiron Books
- Publication date: July 6, 2021
- Publication place: United States
- Media type: Print (hardcover), e-book, audio
- Pages: 322 (1st ed. Hardcover)
- Award: Hammett Prize (2022); ITW Award (2022)
- ISBN: 9781250252708 (1st ed. Hardcover)
- OCLC: 1184238878
- Dewey Decimal: 813/.6
- LC Class: PS3603.O7988 R39 2021

Razorblade Tears: A Novel is a crime novel by S. A. Cosby, published in July 2021 by Flatiron Books. This novel debuted at number 10 on the New York Times bestseller list. Jerry Bruckheimer's company has "optioned the story for Paramount."

== Plot ==
Ike Randolph and Buddy Lee are aging ex-cons living in rural Virginia. When their sons, a black and white couple with a baby daughter, are brutally murdered, the two men team up and embark on a quest for revenge. As they try and track down their sons' killers, they also confront their own prejudices toward their sons and each other.

== Reception ==
In a starred review, Kirkus Reviews praised Cosby's main characters, calling them "two compelling antiheroes you’ll root for from the start", and concluded by noting "violence and love go hand in hand in this tale of two rough men seeking vengeance for their murdered sons."

Langston Collin Wilkins of BookPage called the novel a "contemplative mystery and a stunning thrill ride" and praised Cosby's balance between "incredibly complicated characters" and "enveloping suspense." Wilkins continues: "Razorblade Tears features poignant, purposeful social commentary as Cosby takes a critical yet sensitive look at homophobia, racism, classicism and toxic masculinity."

José H. Bográn of the Washington Independent Review of Books writes, "Although it touches on sensitive topics, Razorblade Tears is primarily crime fiction with a mystery at its core and a big reveal at the end. The action sequences come fast and close together and pulse with a visceral streak that will leave readers holding their breath until the final gunshot rings out. It's no wonder the novel has already been optioned by Paramount Players."

Carole Bell of NPR says, "Reading Razorblade Tears is a visceral full-body experience, a sharp jolt to the heart, and a treat for the senses." Bell continues: "As uneasy as I was, he made me root for the redemption of two men with homophobia and bloody revenge in their hearts [...] Cosby's high-octane drama cements his ascension as a prince of the literary action thriller."

Adam Sternbergh of The New York Times says, "Cosby writes in a spirit of generous abundance and gleeful abandon and, unlike a lot of noir writers, he doesn't shy from operatic emotion. His antiheroes rant, they cry, they beat their chests in anguish and pound their fists in rage...The ride isn't seamless. When you're as exuberant with language as Cosby is, not every turn of phrase is going to land, though his hit rate is impressively high. And the novel's...finale...snaps together with a tidy efficiency that belies the emotional messiness of the preceding tale."

=== Awards ===
Year	Award		Result	Ref
	Goodreads Choice Awards	Mystery & Thriller	Nominated—10th	
2021	Los Angeles Times Book Prize	Mystery/Thriller	Shortlisted	
2022	Anthony Award	Novel	Shortlisted	
2022	Audie Award	Thriller/Suspense	Shortlisted	
2022	Barry Award	Novel	Won	
2022	BCALA Literary Awards	Fiction	Won	
2022	Edgar Awards	Novel	Shortlisted	
2022	CWA Gold Dagger	—	Shortlisted	
2022	Hammett Prize	—	Won	
2022	ITW Award	Audiobook	Won	
2022	ITW Award	Hardcover Novel	Won	
2022	Lefty Award	Mystery Novel	Shortlisted	
2022	Macavity Award	Mystery Novel	Won	
2022	RUSA CODES Reading List	Adrenaline	Won	
