= All the Sinners Bleed =

2023 novel by S.A. Cosby

- Author: S. A. Cosby
- Audio read by: Adam Lazarre-White
- Language: English
- Genre: Thriller, Southern noir
- Publisher: Flatiron Books (US); Headline Publishing (UK)
- Publication date: June 6, 2023 (US & UK)
- Media type: Print, ebook, audiobook
- Pages: 338 pp (1st International hardcover ed.)
- ISBN: 9781250831910 (1st International hardcover ed.)
- OCLC: 1340645849
- Dewey Decimal: 813/.6
- LC Class: PS3603.O7988 A55 2023

All the Sinners Bleed is a 2023 Southern noir thriller novel written by S. A. Cosby and published by Flatiron Books.

== Overview ==
An African American sheriff, in a small town in southern Virginia, faces off against a serial killer.

An example of "southern noir", the book examines the racial and geopolitical fault lines of America's South.

== Reception ==
In a starred review, Kirkus Reviews called the novel "another provocative and page-turning entry in the Southern noir genre." In another starred review, Publishers Weekly begins their assessment calling it "a superb thriller" and continues to say that "the hard-edged storytelling is supplemented by richly developed characters", that Cosby "elegantly layers his narrative over Virginia's racial history, giving the proceedings uncommon emotional depth."

Authors Chris Bohjalian, Ellery Adams, and Roxane Gay praised the novel with 5-star reviews on Goodreads. The novel was also nominated for the 2023 Goodreads Choice Awards for Mystery & Thriller.

== Awards ==
Year	Award		Result	Ref
2023	Crime Fiction Lovers Award	Book of the Year	Shortlisted	
2023	Goodreads Choice Awards	Mystery & Thriller	Nominated—10th	
2023	Los Angeles Times Book Prize	Mystery/Thriller	Shortlisted	
2023	Libby Book Award	Audiobook	Shortlisted	
2024	Anthony Award	Hardcover Novel	Won	
2024	Andrew Carnegie Medals for Excellence	Fiction	Longlisted	
2024	Audie Award	Audiobook of the Year	Shortlisted	
2024	CWA Ian Fleming Steel Dagger	—	Shortlisted	
2024	Edgar Award	Novel	Shortlisted	
2024	ITW Award	Hardcover Novel	Won	
2024	Lefty Award	Mystery Novel	Shortlisted	
2024	Macavity Award	Mystery Novel	Won	
2024	Southern Book Prize	Fiction	Shortlisted	
2024	The Strand Critics Award	Novel	Shortlisted	

== Television series adaptation ==
In May 2025, Netflix ordered a limited television series adaptation of the novel with Joe Robert Cole serving as writer, director, and executive producer. The nine-episode limited series will star Ṣọpẹ́ Dìrísù, Nicole Beharie, and John Douglas Thompson. Hans Zimmer and his composer collective Bleeding Fingers Music are set to score the music.
