= S. A. Cosby =

American novelist (born 1973)

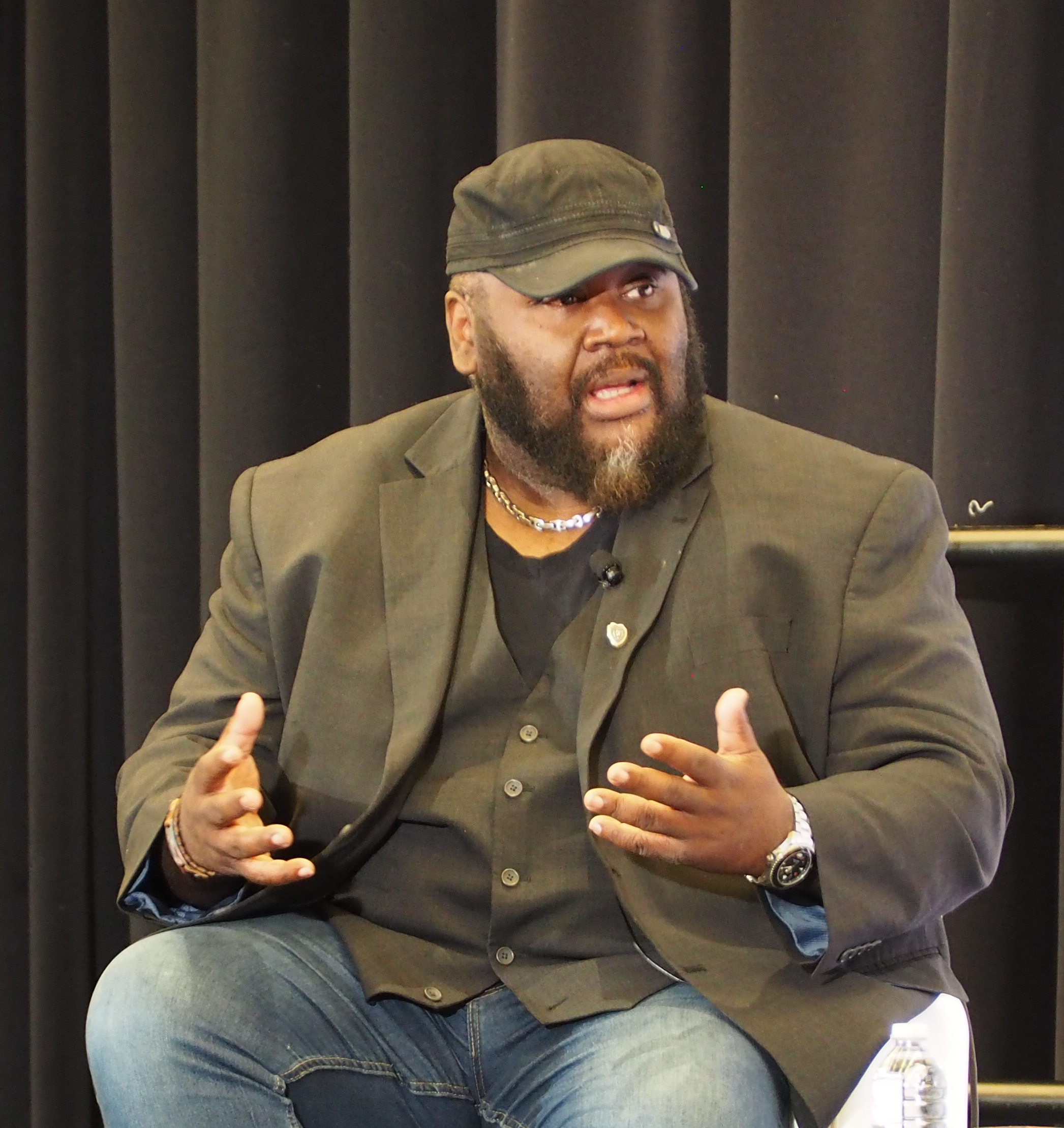
- Cosby at the 2023 National Book Festival
- Born: Shawn Andre Cosby; August 4, 1973 (age 53); Newport News, Virginia, U.S.
- Occupation: Author
- Writing career
- Language: English
- Genre: Southern noir • crime thriller• fantasy
- Notable works: Blacktop Wasteland; Razorblade Tears
- Notable awards: Anthony–Short Story (2019); Anthony–Novel (2021); ITWA–Hardcover (2021); ITWA–Hardcover (2022)

Shawn Andre Cosby (born August 4, 1973, in Newport News, Virginia) is an American author of Southern noir crime fiction. He resides in Gloucester, Virginia on the York River. Cosby has published five crime novels: My Darkest Prayer, Blacktop Wasteland, Razorblade Tears, All the Sinners Bleed, and King of Ashes.

== Early life ==
Cosby grew up in Mathews County, Virginia. His mother was partially disabled and raised Cosby and his brother. His father was a scallop boater on the Chesapeake Bay. Cosby describes his childhood as “a pastoral, almost Huck Finn type.” He spent much of his time reading, and was encouraged by his mother to try writing books of his own. He attended Lee-Jackson Elementary School.

After high school, Cosby began attending college courses, but dropped out due to financial issues. He continued writing while moving around Virginia, eventually settling back in Mathews County. He worked multiple jobs including as a bouncer, in construction, and at a Lowe's while finding some initial publishing success with short stories.

== Career ==
Cosby self-published his first novel, Brotherhood of the Blade, in 2014.

His first traditionally published novel, My Darkest Prayer, was released in 2018 by a small press. His career breakthrough came after he impressed agent Josh Getzler during a crime writing symposium. Getzler was able to place Cosby's second novel, Blacktop Wasteland, with Flatiron Books. This was followed by Razorblade Tears in 2021, All the Sinners Bleed in 2023, and King of Ashes in 2025.

Cosby's writing is informed by his experiences growing up and living in the South. His works explore masculinity, racism, and the tension between Southern history and the present. Cosby says of the South: "If there's a place that is more haunted by its past and more overwhelmed by its original sin than the South, I'm unaware of it."

== Awards and accolades ==
Cosby's 2021 novel, Razorblade Tears, debuted #10 on The New York Times Best Seller list. The book was featured on Jimmy Fallon's The Tonight Show for Fallon's 2021 Summer Reads Book Club. The book was one of six contenders for a Jimmy Fallon read. It won or was nominated for a slew of awards, particularly ones that honor thrillers, suspense, and mystery, such as the Anthony Award, Barry Award, Edgar Award, Gold Dagger, ITW Award, Macavity Award, and Lefty Award. It was received positively by critics and audiences.

His previous novel, Blacktop Wasteland "...won a landslide of awards, including a Los Angeles Times Book Prize in 2020." Notably, it is a 2021 Anthony Award and Macavity Award winner. The International Thriller Writers, an association spanning 49 countries, with a membership of 4,500 authors of the genre, voted Blacktop Wasteland the ITW Award Best Hardcover Novel of 2021. It also was chosen as a 2020 New York Times Notable Book and charted at #22 on that list.

| Year | Work | Award | | Result | Ref |
|---|---|---|---|---|---|
| 2020 | Blacktop Wasteland | Goodreads Choice Awards | Mystery & Thriller | Nominated—16th | |
| 2020 | Blacktop Wasteland | Los Angeles Times Book Prize | Mystery/Thriller | Won | |
| 2021 | Blacktop Wasteland | Anthony Award | Novel | Won | |
| 2021 | Blacktop Wasteland | Barry Award | Novel | Won | |
| 2021 | Blacktop Wasteland | BCALA Literary Awards | Fiction | Honor | |
| 2021 | Blacktop Wasteland | CWA Gold Dagger | — | Shortlisted | |
| 2021 | Blacktop Wasteland | ITW Award | Hardcover Novel | Won | |
| 2021 | Blacktop Wasteland | Lefty Award | Mystery Novel | Shortlisted | |
| 2021 | Blacktop Wasteland | Macavity Award | Mystery Novel | Won | |
| 2021 | Blacktop Wasteland | RUSA CODES Reading List | Adrenaline | Shortlisted | |
| 2021 | Razorblade Tears | Goodreads Choice Awards | Mystery & Thriller | Nominated—10th | |
| 2021 | Razorblade Tears | Los Angeles Times Book Prize | Mystery/Thriller | Shortlisted | |
| 2022 | Razorblade Tears | Anthony Award | Novel | Shortlisted | |
| 2022 | Razorblade Tears | Audie Award | Thriller/Suspense | Shortlisted | |
| 2022 | Razorblade Tears | Barry Award | Novel | Won | |
| 2022 | Razorblade Tears | BCALA Literary Awards | Fiction | Won | |
| 2022 | Razorblade Tears | Edgar Awards | Novel | Shortlisted | |
| 2022 | Razorblade Tears | CWA Gold Dagger | — | Shortlisted | |
| 2022 | Razorblade Tears | Hammett Prize | — | Won | |
| 2022 | Razorblade Tears | ITW Award | Audiobook | Won | |
| 2022 | Razorblade Tears | ITW Award | Hardcover Novel | Won | |
| 2022 | Razorblade Tears | Lefty Award | Mystery Novel | Shortlisted | |
| 2022 | Razorblade Tears | Macavity Award | Mystery Novel | Won | |
| 2022 | Razorblade Tears | RUSA CODES Reading List | Adrenaline | Won | |
| 2023 | All the Sinners Bleed | Crime Fiction Lovers Award | Book of the Year | Shortlisted | |
| 2023 | All the Sinners Bleed | Goodreads Choice Awards | Mystery & Thriller | Nominated—10th | |
| 2023 | All the Sinners Bleed | Los Angeles Times Book Prize | Mystery/Thriller | Shortlisted | |
| 2023 | All the Sinners Bleed | Libby Book Award | Audiobook | Shortlisted | |
| 2024 | All the Sinners Bleed | Anthony Award | Hardcover Novel | Won | |
| 2024 | All the Sinners Bleed | Andrew Carnegie Medals for Excellence | Fiction | Longlisted | |
| 2024 | All the Sinners Bleed | Audie Award | Audiobook of the Year | Shortlisted | |
| 2024 | All the Sinners Bleed | CWA Ian Fleming Steel Dagger | — | Finalist | |
| 2024 | All the Sinners Bleed | Edgar Award | Novel | Shortlisted | |
| 2024 | All the Sinners Bleed | ITW Award | Hardcover Novel | Won | |
| 2024 | All the Sinners Bleed | Lefty Award | Mystery Novel | Shortlisted | |
| 2024 | All the Sinners Bleed | Macavity Award | Mystery Novel | Won | |
| 2024 | All the Sinners Bleed | Southern Book Prize | Fiction | Shortlisted | |
| 2024 | All the Sinners Bleed | The Strand Critics Award | Novel | Shortlisted | |
| 2025 | King of Ashes | Los Angeles Times Book Prize | Mystery/Thriller | Shortlisted | |
| 2026 | King of Ashes | Barry Award | Best Novel | Pending | |
| 2026 | King of Ashes | PEN/Faulkner Award for Fiction | Fiction | Longlisted | |
| 2026 | King of Ashes | Aspen Words Literary Prize | — | Longlisted | |

== Publications ==
- —— (2019). My Darkest Prayer. Intrigue Publishing. ISBN 9781940758862.
- —— (2020). Blacktop Wasteland. Flatiron Books. ISBN 9781250252685.
- —— (2021). Razorblade Tears. Flatiron Books. ISBN 9781250252708.
- —— (2023). All the Sinners Bleed. Flatiron Books. ISBN 9781250831910.
- —— (2025). King of Ashes. Flatiron Books. ISBN 9781250832061.
- —— (2026). Truth to Power: A Luke Cage Marvel Crime Novel. Hyperion Avenue. ISBN 9781368095389.

== Adaptations ==
Blacktop Wasteland and Razorblade Tears have been optioned for films. Jerry Bruckheimer Films "was among the group that won the film rights in an auction" for Razorblade Tears. All the Sinners Bleed is being adapted by Netflix into a nine-episode limited series starring Ṣọpẹ́ Dìrísù, Nicole Beharie, and John Douglas Thompson, with Joe Robert Cole as showrunner, executive producer, and writer. Hans Zimmer and his composer collective Bleeding Fingers Music are set to score the music.
