= Crook Manifesto =

2023 novel by Colson Whitehead

- 2023 dust jacket
- Author: Colson Whitehead
- Language: English
- Series: The Harlem Trilogy #2
- Genre: Crime fiction, detective fiction
- Set in: Harlem in 1971, 1973, and 1976
- Publisher: Doubleday
- Publication date: July 18, 2023
- Publication place: United States
- Media type: Print, ebook, audio
- Pages: 338 (hardcover 1st ed.)
- ISBN: 9780385545150 (hc 1st ed.); 9780385545167 (ebook)
- OCLC: 1330712031
- Dewey Decimal: 813/.54
- LC Class: PS3573.H4768 C76 2023
- Preceded by: Harlem Shuffle
- Followed by: Cool Machine
- Website: Penguin Random House

Crook Manifesto is a 2023 novel by Colson Whitehead, published by Doubleday. It returns to the fictional world of his previous book, Harlem Shuffle. It is a work of crime fiction and a family saga that takes place in Harlem during three periods: 1971, 1973, and 1976, the year of the celebratory United States Bicentennial. It was followed by Cool Machine in July 2026.

== Plot Summary ==
Now older than in Harlem Shuffle, Ray Carney has retreated from the world of small-time crime and is successful as a furniture salesman. As his daughter has grown distant from him, he sees a chance for reconnection in helping her find tickets to a sold out Jackson 5 show. This forces him to rekindle former relationships, drawing him into small-time criminal moves once again. Along the way he reacquaints himself with a corrupt white cop whose goal is to escape the heat that is on him in New York City. Carney transports stolen jewels, robs a poker game, and rummages through criminals' apartments. According to The New York Times, "Carney is resigned and observant, a participant and a hostage, as he embarks on a nightmarish shotgun ride across New York City."

== Analysis ==
According to Evan Kindley, writing for The New Republic, in recent decades, there has been a meaningful rebirth in the historical fiction genre. He says that it has become the most respected genre in contemporary literature. Kindley, citing a literary scholar, also points out that most of the novels nominated for major American awards since 2000 are historical fiction.

In Kindley's view, Colson Whitehead has been impactful as an author advancing the rise of historical fiction during the 21st century. Although Whitehead has written many kinds of stories, historical fiction is shown to be his forte. Whitehead's career shows that he has interest in writing elaborate historical settings. These settings can be unusual. For instance, there is the unclear time period of New York City in his first book, The Intuitionist. Then there is the bizarre, such as the alternate reality of the South in The Underground Railroad. Only Whitehead's 2006 novel, Apex Hides the Hurt, approximates the present, yet it is surreal.

== Reception ==
In a starred review, Kirkus Reviews said of the novel, "It’s not just crime fiction at its craftiest, but shrewdly rendered social history."

Writing for The New York Times Book Review, Walter Mosley described the novel as a "dazzling treatise, a glorious and intricate anatomy of the heist, the con and the slow game. There’s an element of crime here, certainly, but as in Whitehead’s previous books, genre isn’t the point. Here he uses the crime novel as a lens to investigate the mechanics of a singular neighborhood at a particular tipping point in time."

The novel was a finalist for the 2024 Edgar Allan Poe Award for Best Novel. It won the 2024 Gotham Book Prize.

== See also ==
- Blacktop Wasteland (2020) by S. A. Cosby
- Razorblade Tears (2021) by S. A. Cosby
- The Underground Railroad (2016) by Colson Whitehead
- The Nickel Boys (2019) by Colson Whitehead
