= Cool Machine =

2026 novel by Colson Whitehead

- 2026 hardcover book jacket
- Author: Colson Whitehead
- Audio read by: Dion Graham
- Language: English
- Series: Harlem Trilogy
- Subject: Harlem, Theft, Family
- Genre: Historical fiction
- Set in: Harlem, New York City
- Published: July 21, 2026
- Publisher: Doubleday
- ISBN: 9780385550505
- OCLC: 1547291804
- Preceded by: Crook Manifesto
- Website: Penguin Random House

Cool Machine is the third novel in Colson Whitehead's Harlem Trilogy series. It was released by Doubleday on July 21, 2026.

== Plot summary ==
Cool Machine is the third and final novel in Whitehead’s Harlem Trilogy, preceded by Harlem Shuffle, set in the 1960s, and Crook Manifesto, set in the 1970s. The book takes place in New York City, specifically Harlem, during the 1980s. This is a period with real estate development, homelessness, and high crime rates. The story centers on Ray Carney, a successful furniture store owner who also lives a double life as a part-time criminal fence, in other words, someone who buys and sells stolen goods.

The novel is divided into three connected sections, each set in a different year of the 1980s. So, in 1981, after his wife Elizabeth is denied a bank loan to start her own travel agency, Carney decides to help fund her business by joining a crew for a major heist at the Waldorf Astoria hotel. In 1983, the focus shifts to Pepper, Carney’s noticeably older criminal associate. Elizabeth hires Pepper to act as a bodyguard for an art dealer transporting a valuable African mask. When the mask goes missing, Pepper searches the gritty East Village for it while dodging a violent hitman. In 1986, Carney is forced to use his criminal connections and skills to protect his nephew, Robert, the son of his late cousin Freddie, who is being framed for the murder of a corrupt lawyer.

== Themes ==
In this book, the city becomes a character. Hence, New York City is central to the story, with its changing landscape that mirrors the characters' lives and decisions. There are also themes of survival and morality. In other words, the book shows how the characters navigate a corrupt system. They have to juggle their family obligations and lives with their criminal activities to survive and protect the people they care about.

== Analysis ==
According to Evan Kindley, writing for The New Republic, in recent decades, there has been a meaningful rebirth in the historical fiction genre. He says that it has become the most respected genre in contemporary literature. Kindley, citing a literary scholar, also points out that most of the novels nominated for major American awards since 2000 are historical fiction.

In Kindley's view, Colson Whitehead has been impactful as an author advancing the rise of historical fiction during the 21st century. Although Whitehead has written many kinds of stories, historical fiction is shown to be his forte. Whitehead's career shows that he has interest in writing elaborate historical settings. These settings can be unusual. For instance, there is the unclear time period of New York City in his first book, The Intuitionist. Then there is the bizarre, such as the alternate reality of the South in The Underground Railroad. Only Whitehead's 2006 novel, Apex Hides the Hurt, approximates the present, yet it is surreal.

== Reception ==
Harper's Bazaar says, "Colson Whitehead has won the Pulitzer Prize two very well-deserved times, and Cool Machine is the latest in his staggeringly poignant oeuvre. New York City as it existed in the 1980s serves as the backdrop for this novel, and Whitehead masterfully leverages both its grit and glamour to stunning effect." Oprah Daily says, this book is a vainglorious journey "through early ’80s New York. In Cool Machine, furniture dealer Ray Carney—who secretly buys and flips stolen goods with expert finesse. [He] is tempted into one last job when money tightens at home, while his lethal partner Pepper drifts into downtown art-club chaos. Add old ghosts, bigger risks, and a city turning glossy and ruthless, and you’ve got Whitehead at his best."

Kirkus Reviews says that Whitehead's "... three page-turning thrillers...that [are] sustained throughout by rich, engaging characterizations and lucid, provocative reflections on a community, a city, and a people which it presents as both exasperating and captivating with equal intensity. [Whitehouse] is a master novelist in full command of his powers as a storyteller, prose stylist, and social observer." Christopher Borrelli, writing for the Chicago Tribune says, his assessment about Whitehead's Harlem Trilogy amounts to being undecided, even though Whitehead is a two-time Pulitzer Prize winner. Borelli then says, however, with [the book] Cool Machine the Trilogy culminates "into a cohesive crime series about Black New York across generations with the finale. This [last book of the Trilogy] runs up to the real estate boom or , bubble, of the mid-1980s, starring visionary/thief/businessman Ray Carney."

According to Miguel Salazar and Laura Thompson writing for the The New York Times Colson's recent three volume work that has Harlem as the backdrop has been completed. The two reviewers also say that "[t]he conclusion to Whitehead’s Harlem trilogy finds the furniture salesman Ray Carney and his on-again-off-again partner in crime, Pepper, navigating midlife, a city in the midst of dramatic transition and, as always, a dubious scheme or two." Claire Valentine McCartney, writing for W culture magazine says, "The two-time Pulitzer Prize winner —— for The Underground Railroad and The Nickel Boys—— closes out his Harlem Trilogy with a novel set in 1980s New York, a decade in which rampant economic growth and real estate development collided with the violent undercurrents running the city. Whitehead’s main character, Ray Carney, a furniture dealer turned master fence, navigates both as he takes on one last big job and tries to rescue his cousin’s son from the city’s worst forces."

The novel was a finalist for the 2026 Kirkus Prize for Fiction.
