= St. Nicholas Historic District =

Historic district in Manhattan, New York

- St. Nicholas Historic District ("Striver's Row")
- U.S. National Register of Historic Places
- U.S. Historic district
- New York State Register of Historic Places
- New York City Landmark
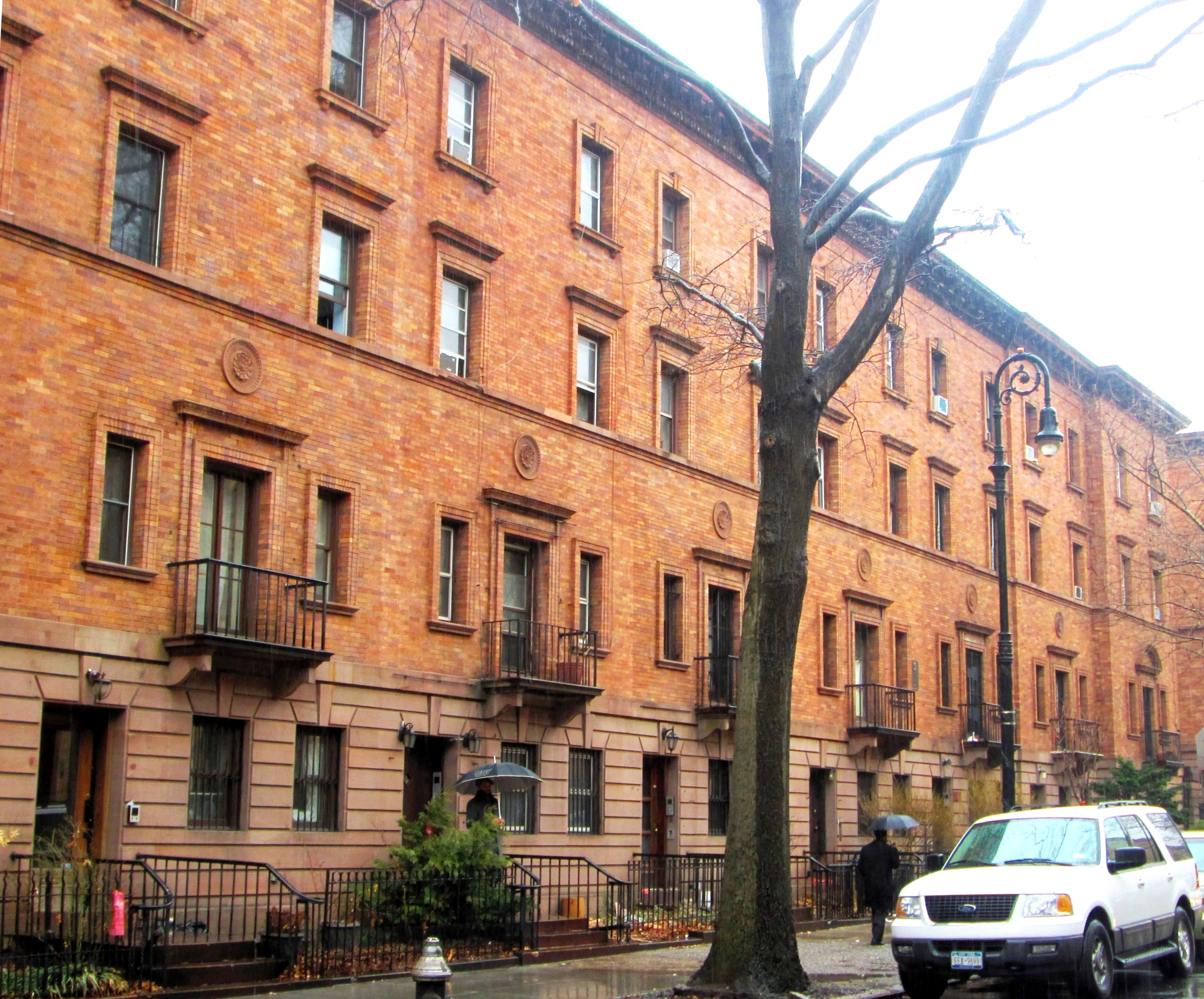
- Row houses by Stanford White on West 139th Street (2014)

- Location within New York City Location within New York Location within the United States
- Location: W. 138th and W. 139th Sts. (both sides) btwn. Adam Clayton Powell Jr. & Frederick Douglass Blvds. Manhattan, New York City
- Coordinates: 40°49′5″N 73°56′37″W
- Area: 9.9 acres (4.0 ha)
- Built: 1891–93
- Architect: James Brown Lord (W.138/south); Bruce Price and Clarence S. Luce (W.138/north & W.139/south); Stanford White of McKim, Mead & White (W.139/north).
- Architectural style: Georgian Revival; Colonial Revival; Italian Renaissance Revival
- NRHP reference No.: 75001209
- NYCL No.: 0322

Significant dates
- Added to NRHP: October 29, 1975
- Designated NYSRHP: June 23, 1980
- Designated NYCL: March 16, 1967

The St. Nicholas Historic District, known colloquially as "Striver's Row", is a historic district located on both sides of West 138th and West 139th Streets between Adam Clayton Powell Jr. Boulevard (Seventh Avenue) and Frederick Douglass Boulevard (Eighth Avenue), in the Harlem neighborhood of Upper Manhattan, New York City. It is both a national and a New York City historic district, and consists of row houses and associated buildings designed by three architectural firms and built in 1891–93 by developer David H. King Jr. These are collectively recognized as gems of New York City architecture, and "an outstanding example of late 19th-century urban design":

There are three sets of buildings:

- the red brick and brownstone buildings on the south (even-numbered) side of West 138th Street and at 2350–2354 Adam Clayton Powell Jr. Boulevard were designed by James Brown Lord in the Georgian Revival style;
- the yellow brick and white limestone with terra cotta trim buildings on the north (odd-numbered) side of 138th and on the south (even-numbered) side of 139th Street and at 2360–2378 Adam Clayton Powell Jr. Boulevard were designed in the Colonial Revival style by Bruce Price and Clarence S. Luce;
- the dark brick, brownstone and terra cotta buildings on the north (odd-numbered) side of 139th Street and at 2380 Adam Clayton Powell Jr. Boulevard were designed in the Italian Renaissance Revival style by Stanford White of the firm McKim, Mead & White.

The district was designated by the New York City Landmarks Preservation Commission in 1967, and was listed on the National Register of Historic Places in 1975. The district's name reflects the nearby St. Nicholas Park.

== History ==
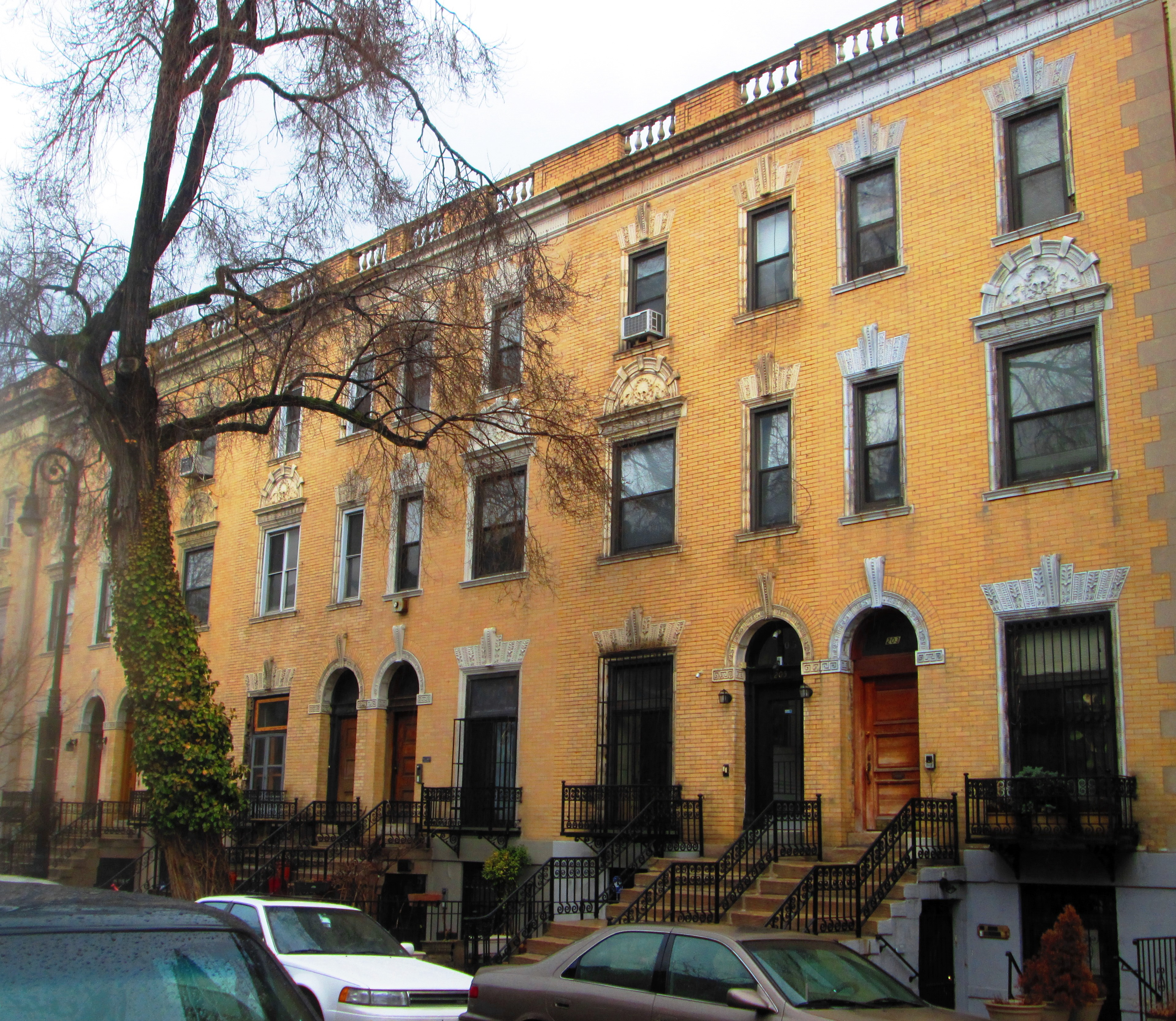
Row houses on West 138th Street designed by Bruce Price and Clarence S. Luce (2014)

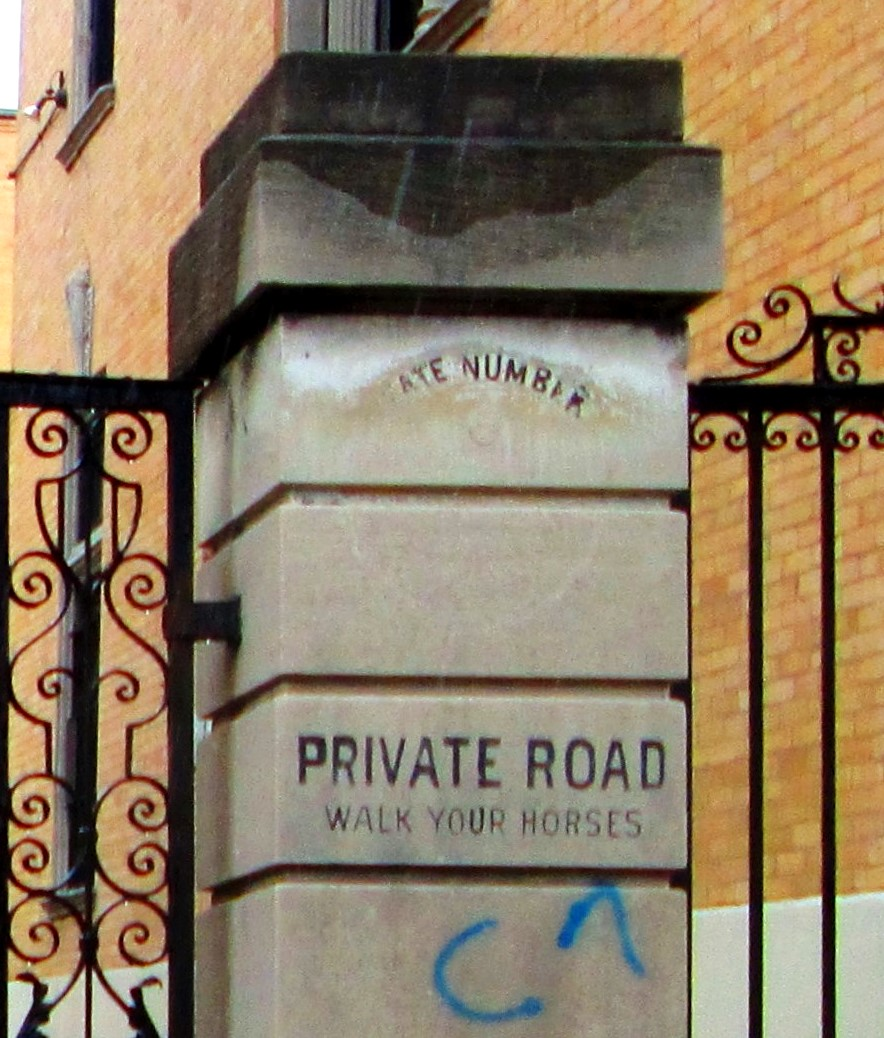
"Walk your horses"

David H. King Jr., the developer of what came to be called "Striver's Row", had previously been responsible for building the 1870 Equitable Building, the 1889 New York Times Building, the version of Madison Square Garden designed by Stanford White, and the Statue of Liberty's base. The townhouses in his new project, which were originally called the "King Model Houses", were intended for upper-middle-class whites, and featured modern amenities, dark woodwork, and views of City College. King's idea was that the project would be "on such a large scale and with such ample resources as to 'Create a Neighborhood' independent of surrounding influences."

The houses sit back-to-back, which allowed King to specify that they would share rear courtyards. The alleyways between them – a rarity in Manhattan – are gated off; some entrance gates still have signs that read "Walk Your Horses". At one time, these alleys allowed discreet stabling of horses and delivery of supplies without disrupting activities in the main houses. Today, the back areas are used almost exclusively for parking.

King sold very few houses and the development failed, with Equitable Life Assurance Society, which had financed the project, foreclosing on almost all the units in 1895, during an economic depression. By this time, Harlem was being abandoned by white New Yorkers, yet the company would not sell the King houses to blacks, and so they sat empty until 1919–20, when they were finally made available to African Americans for $8,000 each. Some of the units were turned into rooming houses, but generally they attracted both leaders of the black community and upwardly-mobile professionals, or "strivers", who gave the district its colloquial name.

Between Seventh and Eighth Avenues, is 139th Street, known among Harlemites as 'strivers' row.' It is the most aristocratic street in Harlem. Stanford White designed the houses for a wealthy white clientele. Moneyed African-Americans now own and inhabit them. When one lives on 'strivers' row' one has supposedly arrived. Harry Rills resides there, as do a number of the leading Babbitts and professional folk of Harlem.

By the 1940s, many of the houses had decayed and were converted to single-room occupancies (SROs). Much of the original decorative detail inside the houses was lost at this time, though the exteriors generally remained unaltered. With the post-1995 real-estate boom in Harlem, many of these buildings are being restored to something resembling their original condition.

== Notable residents ==
Among those who lived on Striver's Row were:

- Eubie Blake, composer, lyricist, and pianist
- Alvin Bragg, attorney and politician
- Will Marion Cook, composer
- Stepin Fetchit, comic actor
- W. C. Handy, composer
- Fletcher Henderson, bandleader and arranger
- Harry Pace, founder of Black Swan Records
- William Pickens, orator, educator, journalist, and essayist
- Adam Clayton Powell Jr., preacher and congressman
- Bill "Bojangles" Robinson, tap dancer and actor
- Noble Sissle, composer
- Vertner Tandy, architect
- Harry Wills, heavyweight boxer
- Louis T. Wright, brain surgeon

== In popular culture ==
- Jazz saxophonist Sonny Rollins, a Harlem native, named a contrafact of Charlie Parker's "Confirmation" after Striver's Row. The piece appears on the 1958 album A Night At The Village Vanguard.
- Jazz singer Cab Calloway mentions Striver's Row in his songs "Hard Times (Topsy Turvy)" and "The Ghost of Smokey Joe".
- Abram Hill's 1940 satirical comedy of manners On Strivers Row, produced with the American Negro Theatre (ANT), concerns "the follies of both social climbing and subtle racism among African Americans during Harlem's Renaissance".
- The Row is mentioned in the W. C. Handy song "Harlem Blues" which appears on the soundtrack to Spike Lee's 1990 film Mo' Better Blues.
- Strivers Row is the name for Penguin Random House publishing imprint created to elevate African-American writers.
- One of the chapters of Colson Whitehead's 2001 novel John Henry Days is set on Striver's Row in the early 1940s.
- Striver's Row, A Novel (2006) by Kevin Baker. This is the third book in Baker's trilogy of historical novels that take place in early 20th-century Harlem. Striver's Row is about a young Malcolm X before he becomes Malcolm X.
- The Strivers' Row Spy by Jason Overstreet. Jason Overstreet's first novel is a historical fiction account of the Harlem Renaissance. Characters include Marcus Garvey, W. E. B. Du Bois, James Weldon Johnson, Adam Clayton Powell, among other historically significant figures.
- In the conclusion of Colson Whitehead’s 2021 novel Harlem Shuffle, the protagonist, Ray Carney considers purchasing a place on Striver’s Row.
- Striver's Row is mentioned as the home of a white murder victim in Law & Order: SVU S10E18 "Baggage"

== See also ==
- List of New York City Designated Landmarks in Manhattan above 110th Street
- National Register of Historic Places listings in Manhattan above 110th Street
