= Sag Harbor (novel) =

2009 novel by Colson Whitehead

- First edition
- Author: Colson Whitehead
- Language: English
- Genre: Literary fiction
- Publisher: Doubleday (HB) & Anchor Books (PB)
- Publication date: April 28, 2009
- Publication place: United States
- Media type: Print (hardcover)
- Pages: 288 pp.
- ISBN: 9780385527651
- OCLC: 213766008

Sag Harbor is a 2009 novel by author Colson Whitehead and distributed by Doubleday.

Sag Harbor takes place in Sag Harbor, New York, a small village in the exclusive Hamptons on the east end of Long Island. The village of Sag Harbor is on the bay side (northern part) of the South Fork of the tip of Long Island, and an old whaling port where several African-American families have bought property over many years despite the area's history of segregation. The novel's main character is Benji, an African American teenager spending the summer in this black enclave of the predominantly white and close-knit town along with his brother Reggie. Set in 1985, the novel touches on themes of race, class, substance abuse, and commercial culture.

== Plot ==
At the start of summer vacation, teenage brothers Benji and Reggie Cooper escape their majority white preparatory academy in Manhattan for the Sag Harbor Hills, Azurest, and Ninevah Beach Subdivisions Historic District. Still clad in Brooks Brothers polos and salmon colored pants, the pair re-meet all of their friends. Like most well-to-do kids at their families' beach houses during the summer, most of the teens in Sag Harbor go almost the entire season with virtually no contact from their parents, including allowances. Benji and Reggie get summer jobs to cover basic expenses, getting around on old bicycles and, sometimes, in a friend's old car. With the lack of parental supervision, the boys manage to get into trouble, like being stuck out of town when their car won't start, and having a BB gun fight that nearly takes out an eye. Racism and the boys' family dysfunctions also haunt them, though Benji finds solace in music and his friends.

== Characters ==
- Benji Cooper
- Reggie Cooper, Benji's brother
- Various friends in Sag Harbor: Clive, Marcus, Bobby, Randy, NP

== Analysis ==
According to Touré's New York Times review of the book, Sag Harbor speaks to a new generation of wealthy young black people. In the wake of the election of President Barack Obama and the success of other African Americans in the national spotlight, this story of a wealthy black teenager depicts a situation that was anachronistic for its 1985 setting. Himself the son of wealthy parents, the novel is a fictional account of Whitehead's life at that time. The 2009 publication of Sag Harbor coincides with what Touré terms the post-black period, when blacks are less noticed for their color and more for their public achievements.

In writing Sag Harbor, named after the town in which Whitehead used to vacation with his family, he wanted to take up a different path, writing for The Wall Street Journal in 2009 that "Having written a string of books that were heavy on the ideas and social critique, I wanted to try something more modest and personal." His previous books, The Intuitionist and John Henry Days, differ in style and genre.

== Release details ==
- —— (April 28, 2009). Sag Harbor (hardcover 1st ed.). USA: Doubleday. ISBN 9780385527651.

== Reception ==
In 2024, the novel was recognized by the Phi Beta Kappa honor society as one of the most assigned books for first-years in the category of contemporary fiction.

== Honors ==
- Finalist, PEN/Faulkner Award for Fiction
- Finalist, Hurston/Wright Legacy Award

== Adaptations ==
=== TV series ===
In August 2021, it was reported that a television series adaptation of the novel was in development at HBO Max. The project was set to be produced by Boat Rocker Media with Laurence Fishburne as executive producer. There has been no new information since the announcement and HBO Max rebranded as Max in May 2023.
