= Martin Luther King at Zion Hill =

Speech by Martin Luther King Jr

Martin Luther King At Zion Hill is a 1962 album of a speech by Martin Luther King Jr. given at Zion Hill Baptist Church. It was released on LP by Dooto Records, a record label owned by Dootsie Williams.

The speech was recorded without King's permission and released without his consent. The Southern Christian Leadership Conference (SCLC), which was chaired by King, tried to have the record withdrawn from sale. A court injunction was eventually issued to prevent further sales. Dooto informed the SCLC that the album had generated $4750 in sales (equivalent to $49,376 in 2024), but production and marketing costs had resulted in an overall loss of $91. The commercial success of the record led to the SCLC to approve the recording and release of King's speeches by Berry Gordy on his Gordy Records label.

The album plays a prominent part in the early life of the character Elwood Curtis in Colson Whitehead's 2019 novel, The Nickel Boys.
