= The Noble Hustle =

2014 non-fiction book by Colson Whitehead

The Noble Hustle: Poker, Beef Jerky and Death
- Front cover
- Author: Colson Whitehead
- Language: English
- Genre: Non-fiction
- Publisher: Knopf Doubleday
- Publication date: 2014
- Publication place: United States
- Media type: Print, e-book
- Pages: 237 pages
- ISBN: 0345804333

The Noble Hustle: Poker, Beef Jerky and Death is a 2014 non-fiction book by American author Colson Whitehead. The book recounts Whitehead's experiences preparing for and competing in the World Series of Poker, alongside random musings and literary asides. The book was released to mixed reviews, with reviewers enjoying the author's wit and turns of phrase but criticizing the book's aimlessness and lack of substance.

== Background ==
In 2011, the ESPN-affiliated blog Grantland offered the MacArthur Grant-winning author Colson Whitehead a job covering that year's World Series of Poker in Las Vegas, Nevada. Whitehead agreed after Grantland offered to cover the author's $10,000 entry fee to the tournament in lieu of traditional payment, with the allowance that he was entitled to keep any winnings earned. Whitehead's coverage was published as a multi-part series of columns on the site beginning in July 2011, following which he opted to compile and expand upon the series in book form, which became The Noble Hustle.

== Synopsis ==
The Noble Hustle is written as narrative non-fiction, proceeding mostly linearly from Whitehead's acceptance of the Grantland job offer through his six-week training session and finally the tournament competition itself. The author takes numerous side roads during the narrative journey, adding his thoughts about his pending divorce and shared custody of a child, his first trip to Las Vegas with college friends (one of whom turns out to be film director Darren Aronofsky), historical information about the game of poker, and more.

Whitehead describes the process of training for the tournament, including consulting with a coach and hiring a personal trainer, who helped him with the "Rocky-style conditioning" needed to remain seated for hours at a time. Though he had experience playing poker with friends, Whitehead had never participated in a casino tournament, and he spent much of the training period taking a bus from his home in New York to Atlantic City and playing there.

The author eventually recounts his time spending seven days in Las Vegas during the World Series event. While Whitehead is able to last until the second day of the tournament's main event, he ultimately loses without placing high enough to earn money. That loss was partially responsible for the existence of the book; "If I'd won," he writes, "you might not be reading this right now."

== Reception ==
The Noble Hustle received mixed reviews upon its release. David Kirby wrote in The New York Times Book Review that the book uses poker as a metaphor for the human experience and praised Whitehead's ability to include "a one-liner on almost every page". Writing for the Los Angeles Times, Robert Anasi called the book "charming" but ultimately lacking the depth needed to elevate it from magazine article status. Similarly, Steven Barthelme wrote in The Washington Post that the book frequently succeeds in making something interesting out of reading about poker, but that its "lack of overall substance" caused it to be "disappointing".
