= Anasi =

Anasi may refer to:

- Anasi language
- Robert Anasi
