= The Colossus of New York (book) =

2003 book by Colson Whitehead

- Author: Colson Whitehead
- Language: English
- Set in: New York City
- Published: 2003
- Publisher: Doubleday
- Publication place: United States
- Media type: Print, e-book
- Pages: 158
- ISBN: 978-0385507943

The Colossus of New York is a 2003 book about the history of New York City by American writer Colson Whitehead.

The subtitle of the book reads "A City in 13 Parts."
