= Harlem Shuffle (novel) =

2021 novel by Colson Whitehead

- First edition cover
- Author: Colson Whitehead
- Language: English
- Series: The Harlem Trilogy
- Release number: 1
- Genre: Crime; family saga
- Set in: Harlem in 1959, 1961 and 1964
- Publisher: Doubleday
- Publication date: September 14, 2021
- Publication place: United States
- Media type: Print (hardcover and paperback), ebook, audiobook
- Pages: 336
- ISBN: 978-0-385-54513-6 (first edition hardcover)
- OCLC: 1198988746
- Dewey Decimal: 813/.54
- LC Class: PS3573.H4768 H37 2020
- Followed by: Crook Manifesto

Harlem Shuffle is a 2021 novel by American novelist Colson Whitehead. It is the follow-up to Whitehead's 2019 novel The Nickel Boys, which earned him his second Pulitzer Prize for Fiction. The first book in Whitehead's "Harlem Trilogy," it is a work of crime fiction and a family saga that takes place in Harlem between 1959 and 1964. It was published by Doubleday on September 14, 2021.

A sequel entitled Crook Manifesto was published in July 2023, followed by Cool Machine in July 2026.

== Synopsis ==
=== Part One ===
In 1959, Ray Carney lives in Harlem with his wife Elizabeth, with whom he is expecting a second child. Although descending from a criminal family, Ray makes his living working as an upstanding furniture salesman on 125th Street. However, he occasionally fences stolen goods through his furniture store, including those from his cousin Freddie. Whereas Ray has steered his way toward an honest living, Freddie is descending into Harlem's criminal underworld. Freddie volunteers a reluctant Ray to fence the stolen goods in a robbery of the Hotel Theresa he and his associates, Arthur, Pepper and Miami Joe, are planning, to Ray's fury. However, the heist goes wrong after Miami Joe kills a hostage, leading the group to run afoul of Chink Montague, a mob boss whose territory includes the hotel. The group discovers they stole a necklace intended for Montague's girlfriend and force Ray to fence the stolen goods, to his displeasure. Initially unsure of what to do, Ray decides to tell on Arthur to Chink and warn the former. However, Freddie later tells him Arthur was murdered. Pepper and an unwilling Ray search for a missing Miami Joe, who pursues the latter to his furniture store after being caught and reveals his intentions to betray and kill his team. Pepper kills Miami Joe and leaves Ray to dispose of his body. A month later, Pepper gives Ray the necklace, which he sells a year later and begins accepting his illicit activities.

=== Part Two ===
In 1961, Ray has been paying protection money to Chink and bribes police detective Munson to overlook his fencing since the Hotel Theresa heist. Freddie lives with Linus, a white man and Ray speculates he is involved with Biz Dixon, a drug dealer. Ray unsuccessfully bribes Winifred Duke, a banker, to join the Dumas Club, a prestigious Black social club, to his anger. Plotting revenge against Winifred, Ray schemes to have Winifred photographed in lewd positions with a sex worker, Miss Laura, and distribute the photos to a newspaper. Miss Laura agrees on the condition Ray eliminates her pimp, Cheap Brucie so he informs Munson about Biz Dixon in exchange for the Cheap Brucie's arrest. This leads to Freddie, Biz Dixon and Cheap Brucie getting arrested. A newspaper publishes the photographs and Winifred's past wrongdoings become public knowledge, causing him to flee. Pepper discovers Ray's exploitation of him in his revenge plot, enraging him. Ray begins embracing his criminal behavior more fully.

=== Part Three ===
Three years later, during the Harlem riot of 1964, Freddie visits Ray's store and asks him to hide a suitcase in his safe. Chink's men accost Ray, demanding Freddie's location, prompting Ray to go to his apartment where he discovers Linus has fatally overdosed. Police officials interrogate Ray about Freddie's relation to Linus' death. Ray, now a member of the Dumas club, learns from Pierce, another member, Linus' family, the Van Wycks run a real estate empire and use violence against perceived enemies. Ray opens the suitcase from Freddy and discovers an emerald necklace alongside papers. Freddie explains he and Linus sneaked into the latter's father's mansion but were caught and that he fears their retaliation following Linus' death. Ray enlists Pepper to watch his store while he gets rid of the emerald necklace but gets betrayed by the jeweler who alerts the Van Wyck's lawyer, Ed Bench. Bench repossesses the necklace and negotiates the safe's contents for Freddy's freedom. The exchange occurs in an unfinished Van Wyck office building. Pepper kills Bench's henchmen after seeing them brutally beat Freddy for negatively influencing Linus. Ray hastily completes the exchange and rushes Freddy to the hospital where he succumbs to his injuries. Eighteen moths later, Ray reflects on the Van Wycks' motives and the nature of New York City.

== Background ==
Harlem Shuffle, Whitehead's eighth novel, was conceived and begun before he wrote The Nickel Boys (2019). Whitehead spent years writing the novel, and ultimately finished it in "bite-sized chunks" during the months he spent in quarantine during the COVID-19 pandemic in New York City. Harlem Shuffle was published by Doubleday on September 14, 2021.

== Reception ==
The novel debuted at number three on The New York Times fiction best-seller list for the week ending September 18, 2021.

In its starred review, Kirkus Reviews called it "as audacious, ingenious, and spellbinding as any of his previous period pieces" and praised the novel's "Dickensian array of colorful, idiosyncratic characters" and Whitehead's "densely layered, intricately woven rendering of New York City in the Kennedy era." Publishers Weekly, in its starred review, praised its "superlative story" and Whitehead's depiction of an early 1960s Harlem "which lands as detailed and vivid as Joyce's Dublin." Writing for The New York Times, Janet Maslin commented, "Though it's a slightly slow starter, Harlem Shuffle has dialogue that crackles, a final third that nearly explodes, hangouts that invite even if they're Chock Full o' Nuts and characters you won't forget even if they don't stick around for more than a few pages."

The novel was a finalist for the 2021 Kirkus Prize for Fiction. Former United States President Barack Obama named Harlem Shuffle one of his favorite books of 2021.
