= Florida Department of Juvenile Justice =

State agency of Florida

Department overview
- Jurisdiction: State of Florida
- Headquarters: Knight Building; 2737 Centerview Drive; Tallahassee, Florida
- Annual budget: $115,969,460(2016-2017)
- Department executive: Matthew Walsh, Secretary
- Website: www.djj.state.fl.us

The Florida Department of Juvenile Justice (FDJJ) is a state agency of Florida that operates juvenile detention centers. Its headquarters are in the Knight Building in Tallahassee.

== List of secretaries ==
Calvin Ross	1998	Lawton Chiles
William "Bill" Bankhead	1999–2004	Jeb Bush
Anthony J. Schembri	2004–2006	Jeb Bush
Walter McNeil	2006–2008	Jeb Bush; Charlie Crist
Frank Peterman	2008–2010	Charlie Crist
Wansley Walters	2010–2014	Rick Scott
Christina Daly	2014–2018	Rick Scott
Simone Marstiller	2018-2021	Ron DeSantis
Eric Hall	2021–2025	Ron DeSantis

Matthew Walsh 2025- present Ron Desantis

== Residential facilities ==
Residential facilities are divided among the north, central, and south regions. Within the north region, facilities are divided between the west and east areas.

=== Central Region ===
Car with DJJ markings

Secure:

- Hillsborough Juvenile Detention Center (Tampa)
- Pasco Juvenile Detention Center (Pasco County)
- Brevard Juvenile Detention Center (Cocoa)
- Manatee Regional Juvenile Detention Center (Bradenton)
- Orange Regional Juvenile Detention Center (Orlando)
- Pinellas Juvenile Detention Center (Clearwater)

Hardware secure:

- DeSoto Dual Diagnosed Correctional Facility (unincorporated DeSoto County)
- Falkenburg Academy (unincorporated Hillsborough County)
- Gulf Academy (unincorporated Pinellas County)
- Lake Academy (unincorporated Pinellas County)
- Kissimmee Youth Academy (Kissimmee, Florida)
- Palmetto Youth Academy (unincorporated Manatee County)
- Riverside Academy (Tampa)

Staff secure:

- Brevard Group Treatment Home (unincorporated Brevard County)
- Britt Halfway House (St. Petersburg)
- Les Peters Halfway House (Tampa)
- Mandala (unincorporated Pasco County)
- Peace River Youth Academy (unincorporated DeSoto County)
- Price Halfway House for Girls (Fort Myers)
- Youth Environmental Services (unincorporated Hillsborough County)

Non-secure:

- Avon Park Youth Academy (unincorporated Highlands County)
- Columbus Juvenile Residential Facility (unincorporated Hillsborough County)
- Orlando Intensive Youth Academy (unincorporated Orange County)
- Pasco Girls Academy (unincorporated Pasco County)
- Polk Halfway House (Bartow)
- Space Coast Marine Institute (SCMI) (unincorporated Brevard County)

=== North Region ===
==== East Area ====
Secure:

- Cypress Creek Juvenile Offender Correctional Center (unincorporated Citrus County)
- Daytona Sex Offender Program (unincorporated Volusia County)
- Hastings Youth Academy-Moderate Risk (unincorporated St. Johns County)
- Marion Juvenile Correctional Facility (unincorporated Marion County)
- St. Johns Juvenile Correctional Facility (unincorporated St. Johns County)
- Tiger Serious Habitual Offender Program (SHOP, also the Juvenile Male Serious Habitual Offender Program) (Jacksonville)

Hardware secure: Staff secure:

Staff secure/Non-secure:

- Alachua Academy (Gainesville)

Non-secure:

- Camp E-Nini-Hassee (unincorporated Citrus County)
- Challenge Youth Residential Facility (or Eckerd Youth Challenge Program (EYCP)) - (unincorporated Hernando County)
- Impact House (Jacksonville)
- Nassau Juvenile Residential Facility (or Nassau Halfway House) (Fernandina Beach)
- Oaks Juvenile Residential Facility (unincorporated Volusia County)
- Project Step 1 & 2 Outward Bound (Unincorporated Nassau County)
- St. Johns Youth Academy (unincorporated St. Johns County)
- Union Juvenile Residential Facility (unincorporated Union County)
- Volusia Halfway House (Daytona Beach)

==== West Area ====
Secure:

- North Florida Youth Development Center (NFYDC) (Marianna)
- Okaloosa Youth Development Center (unincorporated Okaloosa County)

Hardware secure:

- Ft. Walton Adolescent Substance Abuse Program (A.S.A.P.) (unincorporated Okaloosa County)
- Gulf Coast Youth Academy (unincorporated Okaloosa County)
- Jackson Juvenile Offender Correctional Center (JJOCC) (Marianna)
- Monticello New Life (Monticello)
- Panther Success Center (unincorporated Hamilton County)
- Walton Youth Development Center (unincorporated Walton County)

Staff secure:

- JoAnn Bridges Academy (unincorporated Madison County)
- Juvenile Unit for Specialized Treatment (J.U.S.T.) (unincorporated Liberty County)
- Milton Girls Juvenile Residential Facility (unincorporated Santa Rosa County)
- Pensacola Boys Base (unincorporated Escambia County)
- Residential Alternative for the Mentally Challenged (RAM-C Program) (unincorporated Madison County)
- Santa Rosa Youth Academy (unincorporated Santa Rosa County)
- Twin Oaks Vocational 14-18 (unincorporated Madison County)
- Twin Oaks Vocational II

Environmentally secure:

- West Florida Wilderness Institute (WFWI) (unincorporated Holmes County)

Non-secure:

- Bristol Youth Academy (Bristol)
- Camp E-Ma-Chamee (unincorporated Santa Rosa County)
- Crestview Sex Offender Program (unincorporated Okaloosa County)
- DOVE Intensive Mental Health (IMH) Program (unincorporated Jackson County)
- DOVE Vocational Academy (unincorporated Jackson County)
- Okaloosa Borderline Development Disability Program (unincorporated Okaloosa County)
- Okaloosa Youth Academy (unincorporated Okaloosa County)

=== South Region ===
Secure:

- Broward Juvenile Detention Center (Fort Lauderdale)
- Palm Beach Juvenile Detention Center (West Palm Beach)
- Monroe Juvenile Detention Center (Key West)
- Collier Juvenile Detention Center (East Naples)
- SWFL Regional Juvenile Detention Center (Fort Myers)
- Miami-Dade Regional Juvenile Detention Center (Miami)
- St Lucie Regional Juvenile Detention Center (Fort Pierce)

Hardware secure:

- Dade Juvenile Residential Facility (unincorporated Miami-Dade County)
- Miami Youth Academy
- Okeechobee Juvenile Offender Corrections Center (Okeechobee)

Staff secure:

- Pompano Substance Abuse Treatment Center (Pompano Beach)
- Palm Beach Youth Academy (West Palm Beach)

Non-secure

- Broward Youth Treatment Center (Pembroke Pines)
- Miami Halfway House (Kendall, unincorporated Miami-Dade County)
- Okeechobee Girls Academy (unincorporated Okeechobee County)
- Okeechobee Intensive Halfway House (OIHH)
- WINGS (Women in Need of Greater Strength) for Life (Goulds, unincorporated Miami-Dade County)

=== Former ===
- Dozier School for Boys

== See also ==
- Youth incarceration in the United States
