= The Nickel Boys =

2019 novel by Colson Whitehead

- First edition cover
- Author: Colson Whitehead
- Audio read by: JD Jackson; Colson Whitehead
- Cover artist: Neil Libbert (photograph); Oliver Munday (design)
- Language: English
- Set in: Florida and New York City
- Publisher: Doubleday
- Publication date: July 16, 2019
- Publication place: United States
- Media type: Print (Hardcover)
- Pages: 224
- Awards: Pulitzer Prize for Fiction; Kirkus Prize for Fiction; Orwell Prize for Political Fiction
- ISBN: 978-0-385-53707-0
- Dewey Decimal: 813.54
- LC Class: PS3573.H4768 N53 2019

The Nickel Boys is a 2019 novel by American novelist Colson Whitehead. It is based on the historic Dozier School, a reform school in Florida that operated for 111 years and was revealed as highly abusive. A university investigation found numerous unmarked graves for unrecorded deaths and a history into the late 20th century of emotional and physical abuse of students.

TIME named it one of the best books of the decade. The Nickel Boys won the 2020 Pulitzer Prize for Fiction. Judges of the prize called the novel "a spare and devastating exploration of abuse at a reform school in Jim Crow-era Florida that is ultimately a powerful tale of human perseverance, dignity and redemption." It is Whitehead's second win, following The Underground Railroad in 2017, making him the fourth writer in history to have won the prize for fiction twice. The novel was adapted into the film Nickel Boys (2024), directed and co-written by RaMell Ross.

== Plot ==
The narrative alternates between the 2010s and the 1960s. In the present, Elwood Curtis is an African-American business owner in New York City. As an investigation into the defunct Nickel Academy begins to expose the school's hidden history of atrocities, including many secretly buried bodies on the premises, many men who were incarcerated at Nickel Academy as boys are coming forward to share their experiences of abuse. Curtis is forced to confront the lasting effects of his experiences there.

In 1960s Tallahassee, Elwood Curtis is a studious African-American high school student with an idealistic sense of justice inspired by Martin Luther King Jr. and Civil Rights marches. He is selected to attend university classes due to his intelligence. However, on the first day of classes he hitchhikes with an African-American man; when they are pulled over and it is discovered that the vehicle was stolen, Elwood is convicted as a delinquent and sent to Nickel Academy, a juvenile reformatory in Eleanor, Florida. Boys at Nickel Academy receive poor education, are made to perform hard labor, and frequently receive brutal corporal punishment. The staff also overlook and cover up sexual abuse and trips "out back" for punishment, from which some boys never return. The students are segregated by race, with Black boys facing worse treatment.

Elwood befriends fellow student Turner, who has a more cynical view of the world and Nickel's administration. Elwood attempts to serve his time without incident, but is seriously beaten on two occasions: once for intervening to help a boy being attacked by sexual assaulters, and another when writing a letter to government authorities detailing the academy's poor conditions and corruption. After Turner overhears of a plan to have Elwood killed by the administration, the two attempt an escape. Elwood is shot dead while Turner escapes; it is revealed that Turner falsely adopted Elwood's identity and attempted to live up to his ideals when he was free.

In the 2010s, with an investigation into Nickel Academy ongoing, "Elwood Curtis" reveals his history and real name, Jack Turner, to his wife, then flies to Tallahassee to give testimony of his friend's fate.

== Characters ==
Whitehead has described the characters as "two different parts of my personality", with Elwood Curtis being "the optimistic or hopeful part of me that believes we can make the world a better place if we keep working at it", and Jack Turner, "the cynical side that says no—this country is founded on genocide, murder, and slavery and it will always be that way."

== Development and writing ==
After dealing with slavery in his Pulitzer-prize winning novel, The Underground Railroad, Whitehead did not want to write "another heavy book." However, he felt the election of Donald Trump compelled him to do so. Whitehead deliberately narrowed the scope of the book and grounded it for the sake of realism, choosing not to include the speculative or fantastic elements of his other novels Zone One or The Underground Railroad.

The Nickel Boys is set at a fictionalized version of the Dozier School for Boys, dubbed Nickel Academy. Whitehead first heard of the real life Dozier School on Twitter in 2014. The school opened in 1900 and closed in 2011. The state of Florida ran Dozier, in Marianna, as a reform school. After decades of allegations against the school for allowing the beatings, rapes, torture, and even murder of students by guards and employees, the Florida Department of Law Enforcement began an investigation of the claims in 2010, followed by additional investigations by the United States Department of Justice in 2011, and an ongoing forensic investigation by Erin Kimmerle at the University of South Florida which began in 2012. The Department of Justice investigation revealed "systemic, egregious, and dangerous practices exacerbated by a lack of accountability and controls". The University of South Florida investigation discovered some 55 graves on school grounds by December 2012, and has continued to identify potential grave sites as recently as March 2019.

== Reception ==
Parul Sehgal, in The New York Times, wrote, "Whitehead has written novels of horror and apocalypse; nothing touches the grimness of the real stories he conveys here." The Washington Post critic Ron Charles wrote, "It shreds our easy confidence in the triumph of goodness and leaves in its place a hard and bitter truth about the ongoing American experiment."

NPR's Maureen Corrigan said "It's a masterpiece squared, rooted in history and American mythology and, yet, painfully topical in its visions of justice and mercy erratically denied."

The New Republic wrote, "The Nickel Boys is fiction, but it burns with outrageous truth." Meanwhile, The Guardian wrote, "[Whitehead] demonstrates to superb effect how racism in America has long operated as a codified and sanctioned activity intended to enrich one group at the expense of another."

The book received a starred review from Kirkus Reviews, which noted "Whitehead's novel displays its author's facility with violent imagery and his skill at weaving narrative strands into an ingenious if disquieting whole."

== Awards and recognition ==
- Winner, 2020 Pulitzer Prize for Fiction
- Winner, 2019 Kirkus Prize for Fiction
- Winner, 2020 Alex Award
- Longlist, 2019 National Book Award for Fiction
- Finalist, 2019 National Book Critics Circle Award for Fiction
- Winner, 2020 Orwell Prize for Political Fiction
- Finalist, 2020 Audie Award for Best Male Narrator

== Film adaptation ==
In October 2022, a film adaptation of The Nickel Boys by MGM's Orion Pictures was announced. RaMell Ross, who directed the film, adapted the screenplay with Joslyn Barnes. The film's cast includes Aunjanue Ellis, Ethan Herisse, Brandon Wilson, Hamish Linklater and Fred Hechinger. Whitehead served as executive producer of the film. The film was released under the title Nickel Boys on December 13, 2024, by Amazon MGM Studios. The film was nominated for Best Picture & Best Adapted Screenplay at the 97th Academy Awards.
