= Zone One =

Book by Colson Whitehead

- First edition (US, hardback)
- Author: Colson Whitehead
- Language: English
- Genre: Horror, post-apocalyptic fiction
- Publisher: Doubleday (US); Harvill Secker (UK)
- Publication date: 2011
- Publication place: United States
- Media type: Print (hardback & paperback)
- Pages: 259 (hardback), 322 (paperback)
- ISBN: 978-0-385-52807-8 (hardback), 978-0-307-45517-8 (paperback)
- OCLC: 699763904
- Dewey Decimal: 813’.54—dc22
- LC Class: 2011008339

Zone One is a 2011 novel by American author Colson Whitehead. Blending elements of genre fiction and literary fiction, the novel takes place in a post-apocalyptic United States ravaged by zombies. Whitehead has stated that the novel was partly an attempt to return to his adolescent fascination with horror writer Stephen King and science fiction icon Isaac Asimov.

== Plot summary ==
A virus has laid waste to civilization, turning the infected into flesh-eating and mortally contagious zombies. But events have stabilized, and the rebuilding process has begun. Over a three-day span, "Mark Spitz" and his fellow "sweepers"—other survivors of the apocalypse—patrol portions of New York City, eliminating zombies as part of a mission to make the city habitable once again. Flashbacks pepper the narrative, explaining how Mark Spitz survived the apocalypse to date and got his nickname along the way.

== Critical reception ==
Reviewing Zone One for Esquire, Tom Chiarella wrote that "Whitehead brilliantly reformulates an old-hat genre to ask the epidemic question of a teetering history—the question about the possibility of survival" and called the book "one of the best books of the year." While Chiarella's review establishes the high-water mark of praise heaped on the book, most critics were similarly impressed. Glen Duncan, who likened the pairing of genre and literary fiction to "an intellectual dating a porn star," concluded that Zone One "is a cool, thoughtful and, for all its ludic violence, strangely tender novel, a celebration of modernity and a pre-emptive wake for its demise." Charlie Jane Anders observed, "this is one zombie story that nobody's ever told before," and opined, "the book pays off marvelously."

Duncan and Anders both had criticisms of the novel, however. Duncan, took issue with the prose, writing, "[s]tylistically the novel takes a while to settle," but that when it does, "Whitehead writes with economy, texture and punch." Anders wondered if the heavy, unpredictable, and sometimes indiscernible use of flashbacks represented a deliberate attempt "to deny the reader any feeling of narrative satisfaction, through denseness and obfuscation."

The novel was a New York Times bestseller.
