= Erin Kimmerle =

Forensic anthropologist

Erin H. Kimmerle
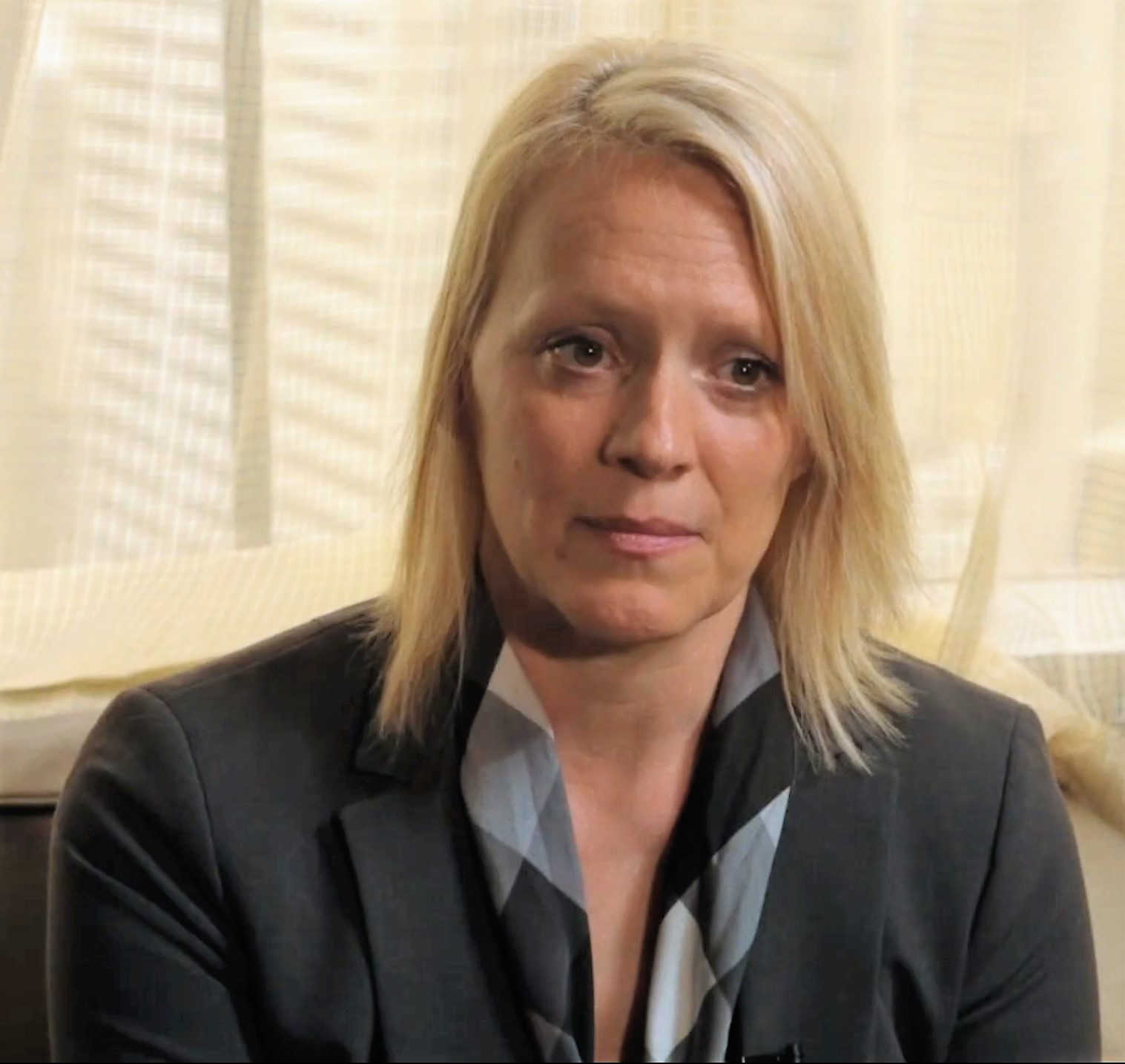
- Education: University of Tennessee; University of Nebraska–Lincoln; Hamline University
- Awards: Herbert Feis Award, American Historical Association, 2025 AAAS Award for Scientific Freedom and Responsibility, 2020 Hillsborough County Bar Association: Liberty Bell Award, 2017
- Scientific career
- Workplaces: University of South Florida
- Website: www.erinkimmerle.com

Erin H. Kimmerle is an American forensic anthropologist, artist, and executive director of the Institute of Forensic Anthropology & Applied Science at the University of South Florida. She was awarded the 2020 AAAS Award for Scientific Freedom and Responsibility.

== Early life and education ==
Kimmerle studied anthropology at Hamline University and graduated in 1994. She worked as an osteologist at the National Museum of Natural History, Smithsonian Institution until 1996, returned for several months to assist with lab analysis at Hamline University before she returned to her academic studies. She moved to the University of Nebraska–Lincoln for her graduate studies, before earning a doctoral degree at the University of Tennessee. In 2001 Kimmerle worked for the United Nations, International Criminal Tribunal for the Former Yugoslavia under Chief Anthropologist Jose Pablo Baraybar. The following year she returned and led the morgue mission as Chief Anthropologist. Her work on the United Nations forensic team included human identification, trauma analysis, mass grave excavation and report writing in Kosovo, Bosnia and Herzegovina, and Croatia. She later worked in Peru, Bermuda, and Nigeria where she helped locate mass graves, identified unknown victims and conducted research on human identification methods.

== Research and career ==
Kimmerle joined the University of South Florida in 2005. She was promoted to assistant professor in 2008 and associate professor in 2012. She is the founder and executive director of the Institute of Forensic Anthropology, which has expanded considerably under her leadership.

At the University of South Florida, Kimmerle led a four-year investigation of the infamous reform school Arthur G. Dozier School for Boys in Marianna, Florida. Kimmerle launched her investigation in 2012, uncovering unmarked graves of former child inmates. She was given permission by the Florida Cabinet and started a year-long excavation of the burials for human identification. Her research involves the use of historic maps. GIS analysis, ground-penetrating radar, archaeological excavation techniques, laboratory analysis of skeletal remains and Forensic art. During the four-year investigation, Kimmerle found the remains of 51 boys who had been buried in unmarked graves. She demonstrated that the incarcerated boys of the Florida reform school had suffered from sexual abuse, starvation, lack of medical attention, and beatings. Kimmerle used DNA analysis to identify the bodies of eight of the boys, who were returned to their families and appropriately buried. Her investigations have been supported by National Institute of Justice, and the Florida Legislature who funded Kimmerle to review unsolved deaths. In 2015 she delivered a TED talk on forensic science and human rights. In 2019 she was involved with a study of remains that could have belonged to Amelia Earhart. In 2020 she launched an investigation into undocumented burial grounds and cemeteries across Hillsborough County, Florida.

She also runs the USF-FORT (Facility for Outdoor Research and Training) program (aka. Florida's Bodyfarm) and the USF Human Donation Program (www.forensics.usf.edu).

=== Selected publications ===
- Kimmerle, Erin H. (2008). Identification of Traumatic Skeletal Injuries Resulting from Human Rights Violations and Modern Warfare: Identification of Injuries Resulting from Human Rights Abuse and Armed Conflict. 2008. ISBN 978-0849392696.
- Kimmerle, Erin H. (2008). Skeletal Trauma: Identification of Injuries Resulting from Human Rights Abuse and Armed Conflict. 2008. ASIN B00A8SN96Q.
- Kimmerle, Erin H. (2008-02-11). "Sexual Dimorphism in America: Geometric Morphometric Analysis of the Craniofacial Region". Journal of Forensic Sciences. 53 (1): 54–57. doi:10.1111/j.1556-4029.2007.00627.x. PMID 18279240. S2CID 34684594.
- Kimmerle, Erin (2022). We Carry Their Bones: The Search for Justice at the Dozier School for Boys. HarperCollins. ISBN 9780063030244.
