= Colson Whitehead =

American novelist (born 1969)

- Whitehead at the Frankfurt Book Fair 2026
- Born: Arch Colson Chipp Whitehead; November 6, 1969 (age 57); New York City, U.S.
- Education: Harvard University (BA)
- Occupation: Writer
- Spouse: Julie Barer
- Children: 2
- Writing career
- Genres: Fiction, non-fiction
- Notable works: The Intuitionist (1999); John Henry Days (2001); Zone One (2011); The Underground Railroad (2016); The Nickel Boys (2019)
- Notable awards: National Book Award for Fiction (2016); Pulitzer Prize for Fiction (2017 and 2020)
- Movement: Afro-Surrealism
- Website: colsonwhitehead.com

Arch Colson Chipp Whitehead (born November 6, 1969) is an American novelist. He is the author of ten novels, including his 1999 debut The Intuitionist; The Underground Railroad (2016), for which he won the 2016 National Book Award for Fiction and the 2017 Pulitzer Prize for Fiction; and The Nickel Boys, for which he won the Pulitzer Prize for Fiction again in 2020, making him one of only four writers ever to win the prize twice. He has also published two books of nonfiction. In 2002, he received a MacArthur Fellowship.

== Early life and education ==
Whitehead was born in New York City and grew up in Manhattan, New York. He is one of four children of successful entrepreneur parents, Arch and Mary Anne Whitehead, who owned an executive recruiting firm. As a child, Whitehead went by his first name, Arch. He later switched to Chipp, before switching to Colson. He attended Trinity School on the Upper West Side.

He graduated from Harvard University in 1991, where he studied English and Comparative Literature. In college, he became friends with poet Kevin Young.

== Career ==
After graduating from college, Whitehead wrote for The Village Voice. While working at the Voice, he began drafting his first novels.

Early in his career, Whitehead lived in Fort Greene, Brooklyn.

Whitehead has since produced 12 book-length works—ten novels and two nonfiction works, including a meditation on life in Manhattan in the style of E. B. White's famous 1949 essay Here Is New York. Whitehead's books are The Intuitionist (1999); John Henry Days (2001); The Colossus of New York (2003); Apex Hides the Hurt (2006); Sag Harbor (2009); 2011's Zone One, a New York Times bestseller; 2016's The Underground Railroad, which earned a National Book Award for Fiction; The Nickel Boys (2019); Harlem Shuffle (2021); and Crook Manifesto (2023). Esquire magazine named The Intuitionist the best first novel of the year, and GQ called it one of the "novels of the millennium". Novelist John Updike, reviewing The Intuitionist in The New Yorker, called Whitehead "ambitious", "scintillating", and "strikingly original", adding: "The young African-American writer to watch may well be a thirty-one-year-old Harvard graduate with the vivid name of Colson Whitehead."

The Intuitionist was nominated as the Common Novel at Rochester Institute of Technology (RIT). The Common Novel nomination was part of a longtime tradition at the Institute that included such authors as Maya Angelou, Andre Dubus III, William Joseph Kennedy, and Anthony Swofford.

Whitehead's nonfiction, essays, and reviews have appeared in numerous publications, including The New York Times, The New Yorker, Granta, and Harper's.

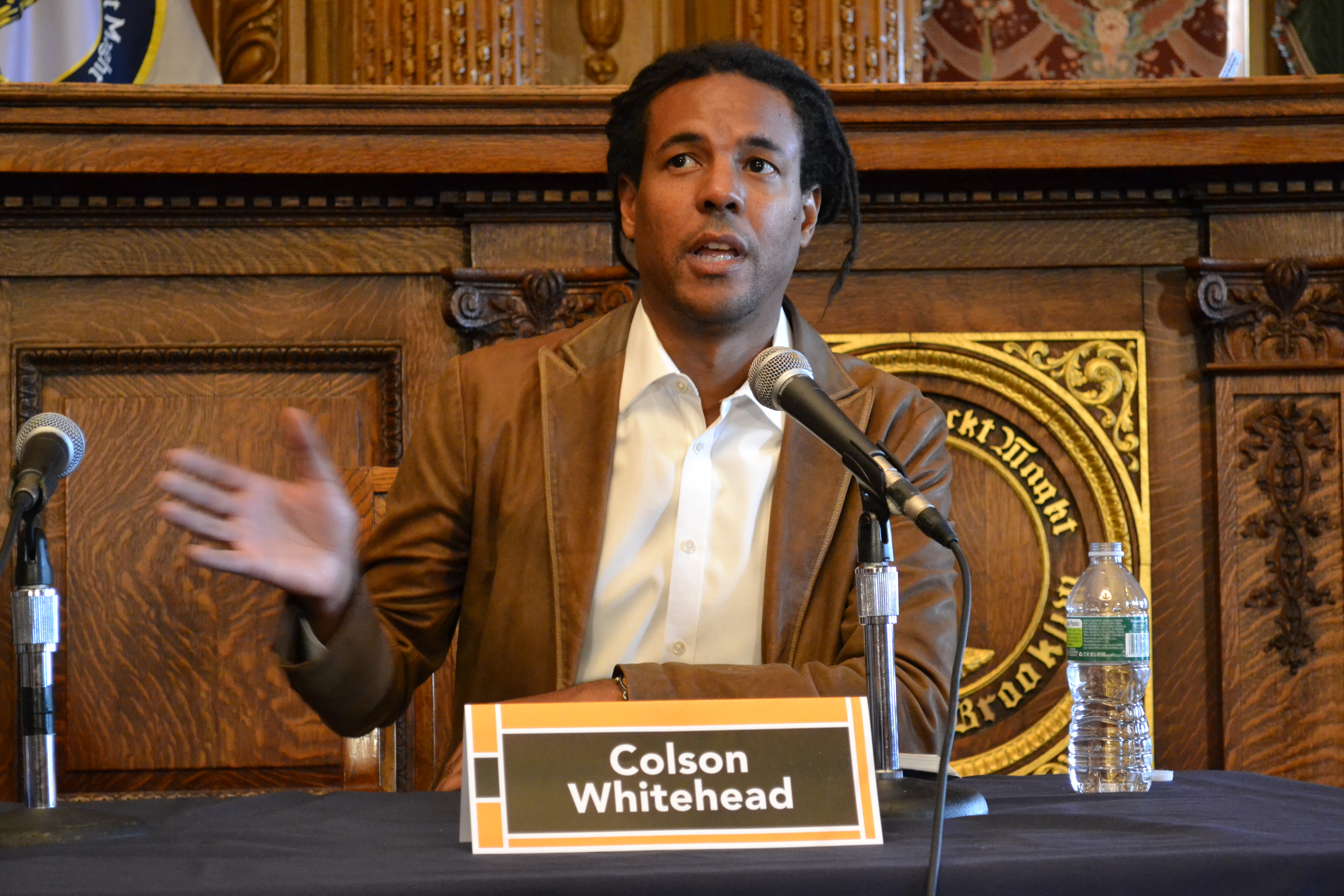
Whitehead at the 2011 Brooklyn Book Festival

His non-fiction account of the 2011 World Series of Poker, The Noble Hustle: Poker, Beef Jerky & Death, was published by Doubleday in 2014.

Whitehead has taught at Princeton University, New York University, the University of Houston, Columbia University, Brooklyn College, Hunter College, and Wesleyan University. He has been a writer-in-residence at Vassar College, the University of Richmond, and the University of Wyoming.

In 2015, he joined The New York Times Magazine to write a column on language.

The Underground Railroad was a selection of Oprah's Book Club 2.0, and was chosen by President Barack Obama as one of five books on his summer vacation reading list. In 2017, the novel was awarded the Carnegie Medal for Excellence in Fiction at the American Library Association Mid-Winter Conference in Atlanta, Georgia. Colson was honored with the 2017 Hurston/Wright Award for fiction presented by the Zora Neale Hurston/Richard Wright Foundation. The Underground Railroad won the 2017 Pulitzer Prize for Fiction. Judges of the prize called the novel "a smart melding of realism and allegory that combines the violence of slavery and the drama of escape in a myth that speaks to contemporary America".

Whitehead's seventh novel, The Nickel Boys, was published in 2019. It was inspired by the story of the Dozier School for Boys in Florida, where children convicted of minor offenses suffered violent abuse. In conjunction with its publication, Whitehead was featured on the cover Time magazine's July 8, 2019, edition, alongside the strap-line "America's Storyteller". The Nickel Boys won the 2020 Pulitzer Prize for Fiction. Judges of the prize called the novel "a spare and devastating exploration of abuse at a reform school in Jim Crow-era Florida that is ultimately a powerful tale of human perseverance, dignity and redemption". It was Whitehead's second win, making him the fourth writer to win the prize twice. In 2022, it was announced that Whitehead would executive produce the 2024 film adaptation of the same name.

Whitehead's eighth novel, Harlem Shuffle, was conceived and begun before he wrote The Nickel Boys. It is a work of crime fiction set in Harlem during the 1960s. Whitehead spent years writing it, and finished it in "bite-sized chunks" during the months he spent in quarantine in New York City during the COVID-19 pandemic. Harlem Shuffle was published by Doubleday on September 14, 2021. Crook Manifesto, Whitehead's ninth novel and a follow-up to Harlem Shuffle, was published on July 18, 2023. Cool Machine, Whitehead's tenth novel and the conclusion to his "Harlem Trilogy," was published on July 21, 2026.

On July 31, 2026, Variety reported that Whitehead's "Harlem Trilogy" was in development at Apple TV, with Graham Yost and Aric Avelino adapting the books.

== Personal life ==
Whitehead lives in Manhattan and also owns a home in Sag Harbor on Long Island. His wife, Julie Barer, is a literary agent. They have two children.

== Honors ==
- 2000: Whiting Award
- 2001: Awarded Residency at Ucross Foundation
- 2002: MacArthur Fellowship
- 2007: Cullman Center for Writers and Scholars Fellowship
- 2012: Dos Passos Prize
- 2013: Guggenheim Fellowship
- 2018: Harvard Arts Medal
- 2020: Library of Congress Prize for American Fiction
- 2023: National Humanities Medal
- 2024: Langston Hughes Medal

=== Literary awards ===
Year	Work	Award	Category	Result	Ref
2000	The Intuitionist	PEN/Hemingway Award	—	Shortlisted	
2000	The Intuitionist	Whiting Awards	Fiction	Won	
2001	John Henry Days	Los Angeles Times Book Prize	Fiction	Shortlisted	
2001	John Henry Days	National Book Critics Circle Award	Fiction	Shortlisted	
2001	John Henry Days	Salon Book Award	Fiction	Won	
2002	John Henry Days	Anisfield-Wolf Book Award	Fiction	Won	
2002	John Henry Days	Pulitzer Prize	Fiction	Finalist	
2002	John Henry Days	Young Lions Fiction Award	Fiction	Won	
2008	Apex Hides the Hurt	PEN Oakland/Josephine Miles Literary Award	—	Won	
2010	Sag Harbor	Hurston/Wright Legacy Award	Fiction	Shortlisted	
2010	Sag Harbor	PEN/Faulkner Award	—	Shortlisted	
2011	Sag Harbor	International Dublin Literary Award	—	Longlisted	
2011	Sag Harbor	Long Island Reads	—	Won	
2012	Zone One	Hurston/Wright Legacy Award	—	Shortlisted	
2016	The Underground Railroad	Booklist Editors' Choice	Adult Audio	Won	
2016	The Underground Railroad	Goodreads Choice Awards	Historical Fiction	Won—1st	
2016	The Underground Railroad	Kirkus Prize	Fiction	Shortlisted	
2016	The Underground Railroad	National Book Award	Fiction	Won	
2017	The Underground Railroad	Andrew Carnegie Medals for Excellence	Fiction	Won	
2017	The Underground Railroad	Arthur C. Clarke Award	—	Won	
2017	The Underground Railroad	Audie Award	Audiobook of the Year	Shortlisted	
2017	The Underground Railroad	Audie Award	Literary Fiction & Classics	Shortlisted	
2017	The Underground Railroad	Audie Award	Female Narrator	Shortlisted	
2017	The Underground Railroad	BCALA Literary Awards	Fiction	Honor	
2017	The Underground Railroad	Booker Prize	—	Longlisted	
2017	The Underground Railroad	Books Are My Bag Readers' Awards	Novel	Won	
2017	The Underground Railroad	Chicago Tribune Heartland Prize	Fiction	Won	
2017	The Underground Railroad	Clark Fiction Prize	—	Won	
2017	The Underground Railroad	Dayton Literary Peace Prize	Fiction	Shortlisted	
2017	The Underground Railroad	Goldsboro Books Glass Bell Award	—	Shortlisted	
2017	The Underground Railroad	Hurston/Wright Legacy Award	Fiction	Won	
2017	The Underground Railroad	Indies Choice Book Awards	Adult Fiction	Won	
2017	The Underground Railroad	John W. Campbell Memorial Award	—	Finalist	
2017	The Underground Railroad	Locus Award	Science Fiction Novel	Nominated	
2017	The Underground Railroad	NAACP Image Awards	Fiction	Shortlisted	
2017	The Underground Railroad	PEN/Jean Stein Book Award	—	Finalist	
2017	The Underground Railroad	Pulitzer Prize	Fiction	Won	
2017	The Underground Railroad	TCK Publishing Reader's Choice Award	Novel	Won	
2018	The Underground Railroad	International Dublin Literary Award	—	Longlisted	
2019	The Nickel Boys	Foyles Books of the Year	Fiction	Shortlisted	
2019	The Nickel Boys	Goodreads Choice Awards	Historical Fiction	Nominated—2nd	
2019	The Nickel Boys	Kirkus Prize	Fiction	Won	
2019	The Nickel Boys	National Book Award	Fiction	Longlisted	
2019	The Nickel Boys	National Book Critics Circle Award	Fiction	Shortlisted	
2020	The Nickel Boys	Alex Award	—	Won	
2020	The Nickel Boys	Andrew Carnegie Medals for Excellence	Fiction	Longlisted	
2020	The Nickel Boys	Aspen Words Literary Prize	—	Longlisted	
2020	The Nickel Boys	Audie Award	Male Narrator	Shortlisted	
2020	The Nickel Boys	BCALA Literary Awards	Fiction	Won	
2020	The Nickel Boys	BookTube Prize	Fiction	Quarterfinalist	
2020	The Nickel Boys	Dayton Literary Peace Prize	Fiction	Finalist	
2020	The Nickel Boys	Orwell Prize	Political Fiction	Won	
2020	The Nickel Boys	Pulitzer Prize	Fiction	Won	
2020	The Nickel Boys	The Writers' Prize	—	Longlisted	
2021	The Nickel Boys	Lincoln Award	—	Nominated	
2021	Harlem Shuffle	Booklist Editors' Choice	Adult Audio	Won	
2021	Harlem Shuffle	Goodreads Choice Awards	Mystery & Thriller	Nominated—6th	
2021	Harlem Shuffle	Hammett Prize	—	Shortlisted	
2021	Harlem Shuffle	Kirkus Prize	Fiction	Shortlisted	
2021	Harlem Shuffle	National Book Critics Circle Award	Fiction	Shortlisted	
2022	Harlem Shuffle	BookTube Prize	Fiction	Octofinalist	
2022	Harlem Shuffle	Gotham Book Prize	Fiction	Shortlisted	
2022	Harlem Shuffle	Macavity Award	Mystery Novel	Shortlisted	
2022	Harlem Shuffle	NAACP Image Award	Fiction	Shortlisted	
2022	Harlem Shuffle	New York City Book Award	—	Won	
2024	Crook Manifesto	Edgar Award	Best Novel	Finalist	
2024	Crook Manifesto	Gotham Book Prize	Fiction	Won	
2026	Cool Machine	Kirkus Prize	Fiction	Finalist	

== Works ==
=== Fiction ===
- —— (1999). The Intuitionist (hardcover 1st ed.). Doubleday. ISBN 9780385492997.
- —— (2001). John Henry Days (hardcover 1st ed.). Doubleday. ISBN 9780385498197.
- —— (2006). Apex Hides the Hurt (hardcover 1st ed.). Doubleday. ISBN 9780385507950.
- —— (2009). Sag Harbor (hardcover 1st ed.). Doubleday. ISBN 9780385527651.
- —— (2011). Zone One (hardcover 1st ed.). Doubleday. ISBN 9780385528078.
- —— (2016). The Underground Railroad (hardcover 1st ed.). Doubleday. ISBN 9780385542364.
- —— (2019). The Nickel Boys (hardcover 1st ed.). Doubleday. ISBN 9780385537070.
- The Harlem Trilogy
  - —— (2021). Harlem Shuffle (hardcover 1st ed.). Doubleday. ISBN 9780385545136.
  - —— (2023). Crook Manifesto (hardcover 1st ed.). Doubleday. ISBN 9780385545150.
  - —— (2026). Cool Machine (hardcover 1st ed.). Doubleday. ISBN 9780385550505.

=== Non-fiction ===
- —— (2003). The Colossus of New York (hardcover 1st ed.). Doubleday. ISBN 9780385507943.
- —— (2014). The Noble Hustle: Poker, Beef Jerky and Death (hardcover 1st ed.). Doubleday. ISBN 9780385537056.

=== Essays ===
- "Lost and Found". The New York Times Magazine. November 11, 2001.
- "A Psychotronic Childhood". The New Yorker. June 4, 2012.
- "Hard Times in the Uncanny Valley". Grantland. ESPN. August 24, 2012.
- "Occasional Dispatches from the Republic of Anhedonia". Grantland. ESPN. May 19, 2013.

=== Short stories ===
- "Down in Front". Granta (86: Film). Summer 2004.
- "The Gangsters". The New Yorker. December 22, 2008.
- "The Match". The New Yorker. April 1, 2019.
- "The Theresa Job". The New Yorker. July 26, 2021.
