= Florida School for Boys =

Reform school operated by the state of Florida, US

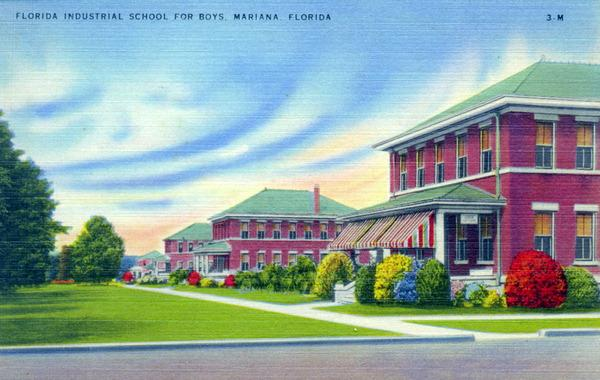
- Postcard illustration, date unknown

Location
- Marianna, Florida; United States; 30°45′36″N 85°15′18″W

Information
- School type: Reform school
- Established: January 1, 1900
- Closed: June 30, 2011
- Gender: Male
- Age: 3 to 21
- Enrollment: 100–900+
- Campus size: 1,400 acres (570 ha)
- Campus type: Rural

The Florida School for Boys, also known as the Arthur G. Dozier School for Boys (AGDS), was a reform school operated by the state of Florida in the panhandle town of Marianna from January 1, 1900, to June 30, 2011. A second campus was opened in the town of Okeechobee in 1955. For a time, it was the largest juvenile reform institution in the United States.

Throughout its 111-year history, the school gained a reputation for abuse, beatings, rapes, torture, and even murder of students by staff. Despite periodic investigations, changes of leadership, and promises to improve, the cruelty and abuse continued.

After the school failed a state inspection in 2009, Governor Charlie Crist ordered a full investigation. Many of the historic and recent allegations of abuse and violence were confirmed by separate investigations by the Florida Department of Law Enforcement in 2010, and by the Civil Rights Division of the United States Department of Justice in 2011. State authorities closed the school permanently in June 2011. At the time of its closure, it was a part of the Florida Department of Juvenile Justice.

Because of questions about the number of deaths at the school and a high number of unmarked graves, the state granted permission for a forensic anthropology survey by Erin Kimmerle of the University of South Florida in 2012. Her team identified 55 burials on the grounds, most outside the cemetery, and documented nearly 100 deaths at the school. In January 2016, Kimmerle issued her final report, having made seven DNA matches and 14 presumptive identifications of remains. They continued to work on identification. Three times as many black as white students died and were buried at Dozier. USF's report noted that excluding a 1914 event in which an estimated six to ten white children were killed in a fire, the racial balance of deaths was consistent with the school's overall population demographics.

After passage of resolutions by both houses of the legislature, on April 26, 2017, the state held a formal ceremony to apologize personally to two dozen survivors of the school and to families of other victims. In 2018, bills were being considered to provide some compensation to victims and their descendants, possibly as scholarships for children.

In 2019, during preliminary survey work for a pollution clean-up, a further 27 suspected graves were identified by ground-penetrating radar.

In 2024, a bill to compensate the victims of The Dozier School for Boys carried by Representative Michelle Salzman and Senator Darryl Rouson was approved by the state legislature and signed into law.

== Campus and structure ==
From its opening in 1900, the Marianna site was an open campus of about 1400 acres without any perimeter fencing. The site was originally divided into two sub-campuses, South Side or "Number 1", for white students, and North Side, or "Number 2", for "colored" students. The sections were segregated until 1966.

A cemetery was located on the North Side, known as the Boot Hill Cemetery. Most of the graves were unmarked, and records of many of the documented 100 students who died at the facility were lacking. A 2014 report from an extensive forensic investigation, carried out by Erin Kimmerle, Ph.D. from the University of South Florida beginning in 2011, said the buried remains of 55 students were found, including numerous remains found outside the cemetery boundaries, in the woods or brush areas. Kimmerle's team has been trying to identify them, some through the use of DNA, but many were still unidentified by the time the report was issued. In 1990–91, the North Side campus was permanently closed.

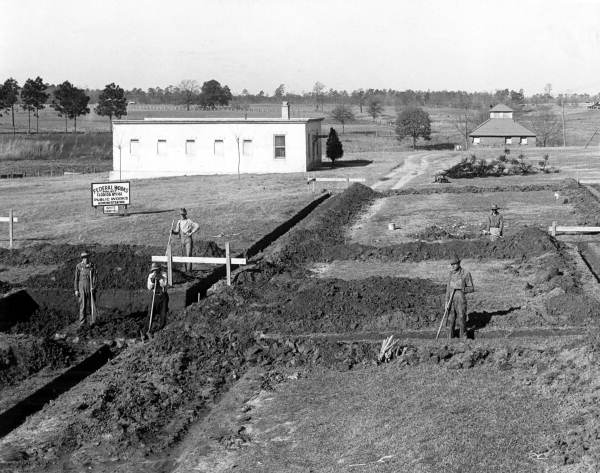
Dining hall construction with "White House" in background, 1936

In 1929, an 11-room concrete block detention building, also containing cells (white students), was constructed to house incorrigible or violent students. The site was not originally fenced. Students called it "The White House."

In the 1950s and 1960s, it was the site of most staff beatings of students. Black boys were also punished in the form of whippings and beatings in the White House, but were detained in segregated isolation cells on the "colored" side of campus.

After corporal punishment at the school was abolished in 1967, the building was used for storage. In 2008, in response to allegations of the extreme beatings and torture that took place there, state officials sealed the building in a public ceremony, leaving a memorial plaque. It has remained empty since.

At the time of the US Justice Department investigation in 2010–11, shortly before the facility was closed, Dozier was a fenced, 159-acre "high-risk" residential facility for 104 boys aged 13 to 21 who had been committed there by a court. Their average length of stay at Dozier was nine to twelve months. They lived in several cottages, with each boy having a room that was unlocked during the day and locked at night.

On an adjacent site was the Jackson Juvenile Offender Center, a "maximum-risk" facility for chronic offenders guilty of felonies or violent crimes. It housed residents in single, locked cells like a prison.

== History ==
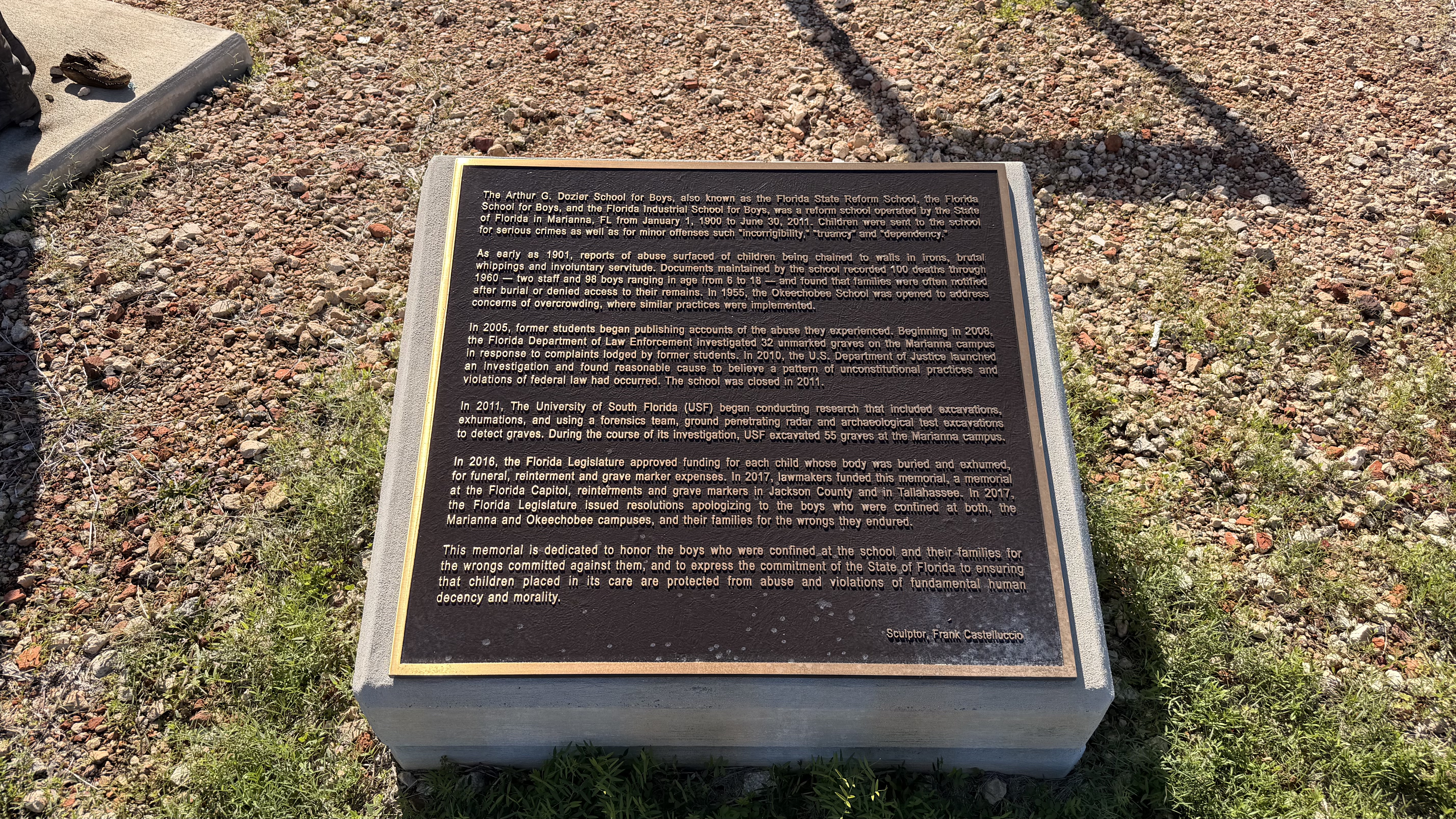
The commemorative plaque placed in the playground adjoining The White House

According to the 2010 abuse investigation by the Florida Department of Law Enforcement, the school was first organized under an 1897 act of the legislature and began operations on the Marianna campus on January 1, 1900, as the Florida State Reform School. It was overseen by five commissioners appointed by the governor William Dunnington Bloxham, who were to operate the school and make biennial reports to the legislature.

At some time thereafter, the commissioners were replaced by the governor and cabinet of Florida, acting as the Board of Commissioners of State Institutions. In 1914, the name was changed to the Florida Industrial School for Boys and in 1957 to the Florida School for Boys. In 1955, the Okeechobee campus opened. In 1967, the name of the Marianna campus was changed to the Arthur G. Dozier School for Boys, in honor of a former superintendent of the school.

In 1903, an inspection reported that children at the school were commonly kept in leg irons. According to the 2012 interim report by the University of South Florida, which was commissioned to investigate the cemetery and burials, the school was investigated by the state six times during its first 13 years of operation.

A fire in a dormitory at the school in 1914 killed an estimated six to ten students and two staff members. Eleven students were recorded as having died in the 1918 Spanish flu epidemic, but they were not named.

A 13-year-old boy sent to the school in 1934 for "trespassing" died 38 days after arriving there. Recorded burials at the Boot Hill Cemetery took place from 1914 to 1952.

=== 1960s ===
Serial killer Paul John Knowles was admitted to the school in his teenage years.

In 1968, Florida Governor Claude Kirk said, after a visit to the school where he found overcrowding and poor conditions, that "somebody should have blown the whistle a long time ago." At this time, the school housed 564 boys, some for offenses as minor as school truancy, running away from home, or "incorrigibility", including cigarette smoking. They ranged in age from ten to sixteen years old. The White House was closed in 1967. Officially, corporal punishment at the school was banned in August 1968.

In 1969, as part of a governmental reorganization, the school came under the management of the Division of Youth Services of the newly created Department of Health and Rehabilitative Services (HRS). In 1996, HRS was reorganized as the Florida Department of Children and Families.

According to a 2009 report following investigation by the Florida Department of Law Enforcement (FDLE), there were 81 school-related deaths of students from 1911 to 1973. Thirty-one of these boys were said to be buried on the school grounds, with other bodies "shipped home to families or buried in unknown locations." There are 31 simple crosses as grave markers at the cemetery, installed in the 1960s and 1990s, but they have been found not to correspond to specific burials. In the 2012 Interim Report by Kimmerle, her team found a total of 98 documented deaths at the school from 1914 to 1973, including two staff members.

=== 1980s and 1990s ===
In 1982, an inspection revealed that boys at the school were "hogtied and kept in isolation for weeks at a time". The ACLU filed a lawsuit over this and similar mistreatment at a total of three juvenile facilities in Florida. By this time, the Dozier School was housing 105 boys aged thirteen to twenty-one.

In 1985, the media reported that young ex-students of the school, sentenced to jail terms for crimes committed at Dozier, had subsequently been the victims of torture by guards at the Jackson County jail. The prison guards typically handcuffed the teenagers and hanged them from the bars of their cells, sometimes for over an hour. The guards said their superiors approved the practice and that it was routine.

Federal lawsuits concerning school conditions resulted in the Department of Justice's monitoring Florida's juvenile justice system beginning in 1987.

In 1994, the school was placed under the management of the newly created Florida Department of Juvenile Justice, which operated the school until its closure in 2011. By this time, the school had facilities to house 135 inmates. Many of the boys sent there had been convicted of rape or of committing "lewd acts on other children".

On September 16, 1998, a resident of the school lost his right arm in a washing machine. A lawsuit was filed against the institution, and the plaintiff was awarded an undisclosed amount in 2003.

=== 21st century ===
In April 2007, the acting superintendent of the school and one other employee were fired following allegations of abuse of inmates. The state officially acknowledged that abuses had taken place there. The White House Boys, a growing group of adult survivors who had been held there in the 1950s and 1960s, were speaking out to the press about conditions and their experiences.

In October 2008, several of them attended a state ceremony to install a historic plaque at the now closed White House that acknowledged that brutal past. The news was carried nationwide.

In late 2009, the school failed its annual inspection. Among other problems, the inspection found that the school failed to deal properly with the numerous complaints by the boys held there, including allegations of continued mistreatment by the guards. State Representative Darryl Rouson said the system was struggling to move on from a longstanding "culture of violence and abuse".

The U.S. Department of Justice conducted a survey of 195 US facilities, including the Florida School For Boys. According to its 2010 report, 11.3% of boys surveyed at the school reported that they had been subject to sexual abuse by staff using force in the last twelve months, and 10.3% reported that they had been subject to it without the use of force. 2.2% reported sexual victimization by another inmate. DOJ said these percentages meant the home was deemed to have neither "high" nor "low" rates of sexual victimization compared with the other institutions assessed in the survey.

In July 2010, the state announced its plan to merge Dozier with JJOC, creating a single new facility, the North Florida Youth Development Center, with an open campus and a closed campus. However, the following year, claiming "budgetary limitations", the state decided to close both facilities on June 30, 2011. Remaining students were sent to other juvenile justice facilities around the state.

After Hurricane Michael in 2018, the Jackson County Sheriff's Office was given the property, now known as "Endeavor", to relocate its damaged offices.

== White House Boys ==
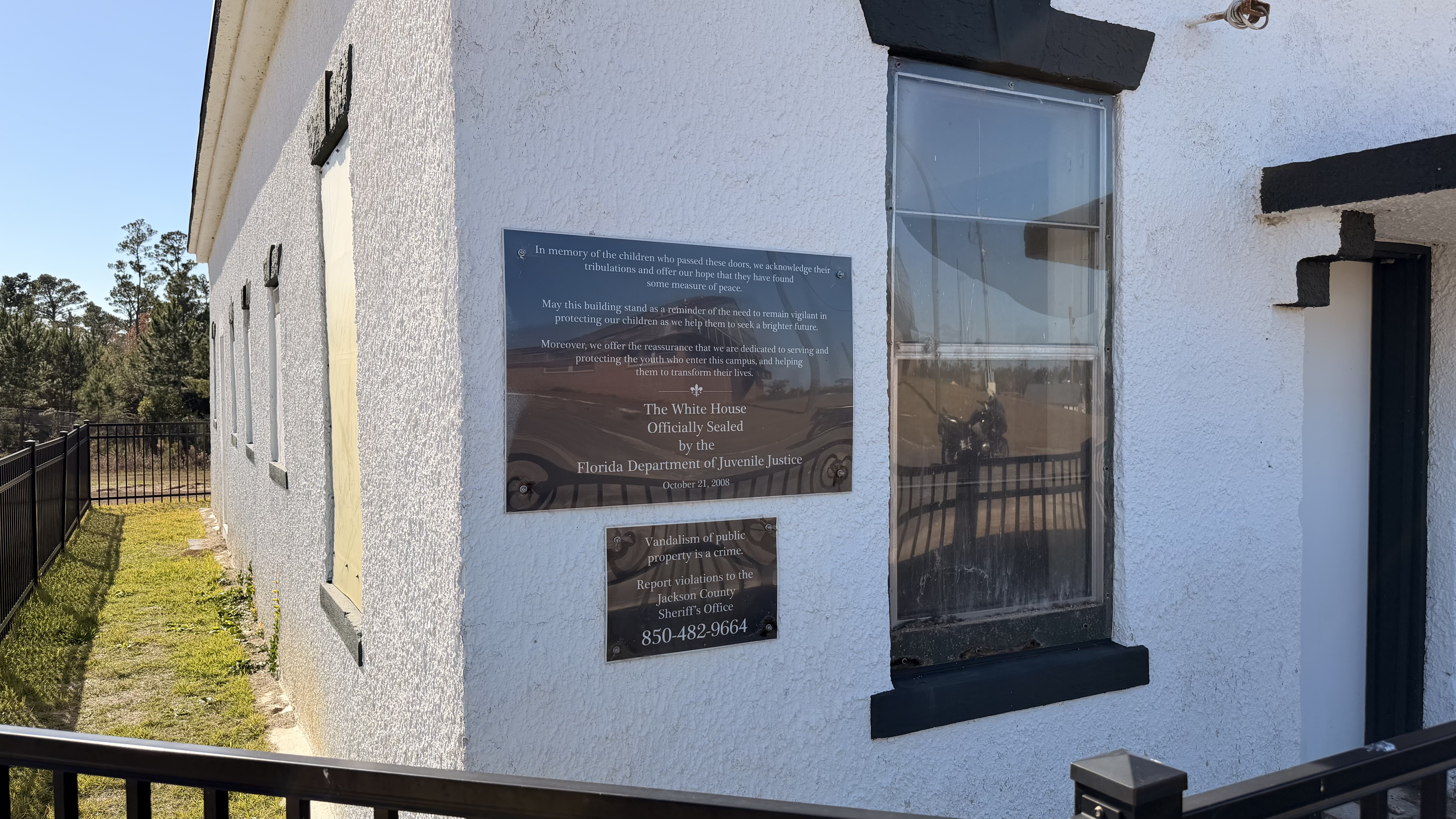
A close up of the commemorative plaques on The White House at the Dozier School for Boys

In the late 20th century, former students who had been held at the school in the 1950s and 1960s began to share accounts of abuses that they had suffered or observed against students. They organized as a group who became known as "The White House Boys". By the early 21st century, there were about 400 members, survivors of the school from the 1950s and 1960s. Since the early 2000s, members of the group began to speak publicly about their experiences to the media, and to challenge the state to investigate practices and personnel at the school. More than 300 men have publicly recounted abuse and torture at the school. The survivors have set up more than one website.

In 2009, the Florida School for Boys was the subject of an extensive special report, For Their Own Good, published by the St. Petersburg Times. Allegations focusing on the 1960s included claims that one room was used for whipping white boys and another for black boys (the facility was fully segregated until 1968). The whippings were carried out by guards using a three-foot-long belt made of leather and metal and were so severe that the victim's underwear could become embedded in his skin. One former student said that he had seen a boy trapped in a running laundry dryer at the school and suspected the boy was killed.

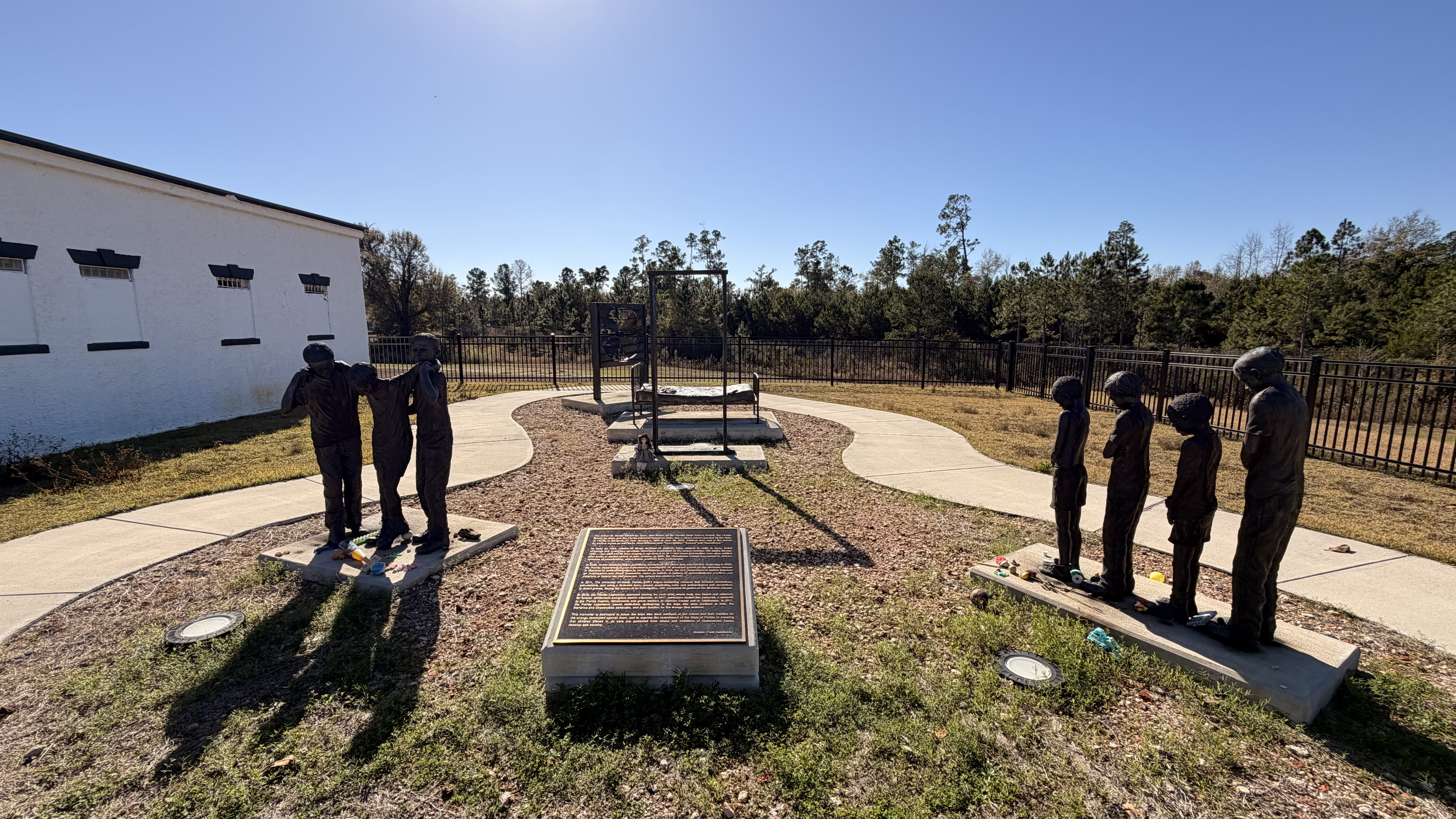
The playground next to The White House

One former student stated he was punished in the White House eleven times, receiving a total of more than 250 lashes. Others alleged they were whipped until they lost consciousness and that the punishments were made harsher for boys who cried. Some alumni also stated there was a "rape room" at the school, where boys were sexually abused by guards. The complainants said some of the victims were as young as nine years old.

In February 2010, the White House Boys filed a class action suit for damages against the state government, but it was dismissed by a judge in Leon County, Florida, because the statute of limitations had run out for such a suit. A bill introduced in the 2012 session of the Florida Legislature to provide compensation to victims of abuse at the school failed to pass. In 2017, the state officially apologized to survivors and families; in 2018 the legislature was considering bills to provide compensation, funds for a memorial, and the creation of a task force to determine where to bury unclaimed remains found during a three-year investigation. After the land was transferred by the state to Marianna, a mandatory study for the EPA found more than two dozen additional unmarked graves.

== Investigations ==
=== Florida Department of Law Enforcement, 2010 ===
On December 9, 2008, Florida Governor Charlie Crist directed the Florida Department of Law Enforcement (FDLE) to investigate the allegations of abuse, torture, and murder recounted by the White House Boys and their law firm.

Crist requested that the department determine:

1) the entity that owned or operated the property at the time the graves were placed,

2) identification, where possible, of the remains of those individuals buried on the site and

3) determine if any crimes were committed, and if so, the perpetrators of those crimes.

The FDLE conducted more than one hundred interviews of former students, family members of former students, and former staff members of the school during the 15-month investigation, but no concrete evidence was found linking any of the student deaths to the actions of school staff, or to any attempts by staff to conceal deaths. None of the graves was opened during the investigation. (The investigation determined that the 31 graves at the facility had been dug between 1914 and 1952.)

A forensic examination of the "White House" was conducted. No trace evidence of blood on the walls was found. Some former Dozier students told investigators that they felt they had "needed the discipline". Troy Tidwell, who was a staff member at the school during that period, said that punishments in the White House were not excessive. He said staff used the leather strap because they were concerned that spankings with wooden paddles, as had previously taken place, might injure the boys.

In January 2010, the Department of Law Enforcement released its findings:

This investigation included over one hundred interviews of former students, family of former students, and former staff members of the school. The interviews confirmed that in addition to the implementation of the Individual Rating System, school administrators used corporal punishment as a tool to encourage obedience. The interviews revealed little disagreement about the way in which corporal punishment was administered. The former students were consistent in that punishment was administered by school administrators and adult staff witnesses in the building referred to as the White House. The former students were consistent in stating that a wooden paddle or leather strap was the implement used for administering punishment. The area of disagreement among former students was the number of spankings administered and their severity. Although some former students stated that they were "beaten" to the point that the skin of their buttocks blistered and bled profusely, there was little to no evidence of visible residual scarring. A secondary disagreement was the former students' perceptions of the punishment process. Some former students stated that their spankings caused them no psychological harm and that they learned from their mistakes, while others stated that, mentally, they suffered greatly as a result and still do so to this day. Some reports by former students stated that in addition to corporal punishment, they were also subjected to sexual abuse at the hands of former staff members or other students. With the passage of over fifty years, no tangible physical evidence was found to either support or refute the allegations of physical or sexual abuse.

On March 11, 2010, State Attorney Glenn Hess announced that no criminal charges would be filed in the case. After interviewing investigators and attorneys representing both the White House Boys and an administrator, and after reviewing the Department of Law Enforcement's report, Hess concluded that he would be unable to prove or disprove criminal wrongdoing in the case in a court of law.

=== Department of Justice, 2011 ===
In its December 2011 report of its investigation at the Dozier School, the Civil Rights Division of the United States Department of Justice made the following findings about staff at the school, who were cited for use of excessive force, inappropriate isolation, and extension of confinement:

The youth confined at Dozier and at JJOC were subjected to conditions that placed them at serious risk of avoidable harm in violation of their rights protected by the Constitution of the United States. During our investigation, we received credible reports of misconduct by staff members to youth within their custody. The allegations revealed systemic, egregious, and dangerous practices exacerbated by a lack of accountability and controls... These systemic deficiencies exist because State policies and generally accepted juvenile justice procedures were not being followed. We found that ... staff did not receive minimally adequate training. We also found that proper supervision and accountability measures were limited and did not suffice to prevent undue restraints and punishments. Staff failed to report allegations of abuse to the State, supervisors, and administrators. Staff members often failed to accurately describe use of force incidents and properly record use of mechanical restraints.

=== University of South Florida, 2012–2014 ===
Erin Kimmerle, a forensic anthropologist and University of South Florida associate professor, led a USF team of anthropologists, biologists, and archaeologists exploring the Marianna campus in a project authorized by the state. The stories of the White House Boys piqued her interest, as she had worked with international groups to identify remains and burials in areas of warfare. She thought the specialists at her university could aid the state in identifying undocumented areas of burial by using current technology and scientific techniques. She was especially curious why there were no records of the locations of the burials, as is customary at state prisons, hospitals and similar institutions.

Kimmerle said,

"When you look at the state hospital, the state prisons, the other state institutions at the time, there are very meticulous plot maps you can reference. Or if you are a family member today, you can say, 'Where is my great-aunt buried?' and they can show you exactly where. So, why that didn't happen here, I don't know. But that does stand out."

In 2012, the team used ground-penetrating radar and some excavation to identify where bodies were buried. However, in order to determine if the cause of death was from injury, illness, or murder, the bodies must be exhumed. Given the long history of reported violence at the school, many people believe that some students died because of abuse. Under existing law, exhumations can be done only at the request of a family member. But many of the burials are of students who were here in the early 20th century, and records make it difficult to identify their families.

By December 2012, the researchers had located 55 graves on the grounds. Given that they had documented nearly 100 deaths at the school, the team believed that a second cemetery was likely to exist.

Thomas Varnadoe was sent to the Florida School for Boys in 1934 and died there a month later. His nephew, Glen Varnadoe, came forward in 2012 saying that he wanted to have his uncle's remains exhumed for reinterment at his family's cemetery near Lakeland. He had visited Dozier School in the 1990s, and a staff member showed him where his uncle might be buried. That location was not the same as the area where the most recent burials were found. The state originally limited the USF team to searching the existing, delineated cemetery grounds, saying they did not have the authority to order exhumation of graves.

=== 2013 court injunction to force exhumations ===
When the state announced plans to sell much of the Dozier property for redevelopment, Varnadoe filed suit against the action, as he was a family member seeking a specific exhumation. A judge issued a temporary injunction blocking the sale until Thomas Varnadoe's body was exhumed. State officials subsequently granted the university team permission to search all areas of the former facility for possible burial sites. They requested federal funds to pay for a forensic examination of all graves on the grounds.

On August 6, 2013, Governor Rick Scott and the Florida Cabinet issued a permit allowing a team of University of South Florida anthropologists and archaeologists to excavate and examine the remains of any boys buried at the Dozier site.

=== Exhumations and identifications ===
Exhumations began on August 31, 2013. According to Robert Straley, a spokesman for the White House Boys:

[T]he school segregated white and black inmates and...remains are located where black inmates were held. He suspects there is another white cemetery that hasn't been discovered. "I think that there are at least 100 more bodies up there", he said. "At some point they are going to find more bodies, I'm dead certain of that. There has to be a white graveyard on the white side."

Bones, teeth, and artifacts from grave sites were sent to the University of North Texas Health Science Center for DNA testing. In January 2014, Kimmerle announced that excavations had yielded remains of 55 bodies, almost twice the number documented in official records.

By September 26, 2014, the remains of three boys, George Owen Smith (reported missing since 1940), Thomas Varnadoe (reportedly died of pneumonia in 1934), and Earl Wilson (died in 1944), had been identified.

In January 2016, the USF team issued its final report. The team had made a total of seven DNA matches and 14 presumptive identifications from the 51 remains found at the site. A total of 55 burials were identified, but only 13 were made within the cemetery grounds, and "the rest of the graves were outside... in the woods, including under a roadway, brush, and a large mulberry tree." While they had documented 98 deaths at the site, they were unable to identify any more burials on the grounds. Some bodies may have been sent home to students' families. The USF team will continue to work with other organizations and families on DNA and other means of identification of the remains that were found. They created computer facial approximations from remains to help with identification. A number of families, including the Glen Varnadoe family, have filed requests to have the remains of their children or relatives repatriated.

In late March 2019, an additional 27 possible graves were identified during a pollution clean-up on the Dozier site. Florida Governor Ron DeSantis directed state agencies to work with Jackson County officials to "develop a path forward".

== State response ==
In March 2014, Governor Rick Scott signed a bill authorizing up to $7,500 per burial for those families who wanted to reinter the remains of relatives identified in unmarked graves at the Florida School for Boys. This followed the University of South Florida's report in January, which said they had been able to make matches of 21 sets of remains to known families. In addition, the bill created a task force to establish a memorial, "as well as deciding how to handle the remains of bodies that have yet to be identified or claimed by families."

On April 26, 2017, the state held a formal ceremony with families and survivors to apologize for the abuses of children at the school. Both houses of the legislature passed resolutions supporting the apology. A proposed House bill ultimately funded two memorials built in Tallahassee and on the former school grounds in Marianna, reburial of remains, and restitution to victims.

In 2024, a bill to compensate the victims of the Dozier School for Boys − carried by Representatives Michelle Salzman, Kiyan Michael, and Senator Darryl Rouson − was approved by the state legislature and was signed into law by Governor Ron DeSantis.

== See also ==
- Bon Secours Mother and Baby Home, maternity home in Ireland where 800 children were found in unmarked graves
- Medomsley Detention Centre, a prison for young males where over 1,800 living former inmates reported sexual and physical abuse by staff.
- Kamloops Indian Residential School
- Marieval Indian Residential School, where 751 unmarked graves were found in June 2021
- Institutional abuse
- List of youth detention incidents in Canada
- School to prison pipeline
- The Nickel Boys, a 2019 fictionalized novel by Colson Whitehead about the school's story, adapted into a film in 2024
- The Reformatory, a 2023 fictionalized novel by Tananarive Due based on her great-uncle's experiences at the school
