= Apex Hides the Hurt =

Novel by Colson Whitehead

- Author: Colson Whitehead
- Language: English
- Subject: American culture
- Genre: Humor
- Publisher: Doubleday
- Publication date: March 21, 2006
- Publication place: United States
- Media type: Print
- Pages: 212
- ISBN: 0-385-50795-X
- OCLC: 60671865
- Preceded by: The Colossus of New York

Apex Hides the Hurt is a 2006 novel by American author Colson Whitehead.

The novel follows an unnamed nomenclature consultant who specializes in creating memorable names for new consumer products. He is asked to visit the town of Winthrop, which is considering changing its name. During his visit, the main character is introduced to several citizens attempting to persuade him in favor of their preferred name for the town.

The novel has received mostly positive reviews from critics, with few negative comments. In a positive review for American magazine Entertainment Weekly, Jennifer Reese called the book "a blurry satire of American commercialism", adding, "it may not mark the apex of Colson Whitehead's career, but it brims with the author's spiky humor and intelligence." The book was included among The New York Times 100 Most Notable Books of the Year for 2006.

== Plot ==
The book is set in the fictional town of Winthrop. The protagonist of the book is an unnamed African-American "nomenclature consultant" who has had recent success in branding and selling Apex bandages, which come in multiple colors to better match a broad array of skin tones. The novel begins with the main character being contacted by his former employer, which he had left after losing a toe. He travels to the town of Winthrop after requests from the town council, which has proposed that the town be renamed. However, three key citizens disagree what the name should be: Albie Winthrop, descendant of the town's namesake (who'd made his fortune in barbed wire); Regina Goode, the mayor (descendant of one of the town's two founders); and Lucky Aberdeen, a software magnate who's leading the drive to rename the town. Winthrop wants to keep the name; Goode wants the town to revert to the name it bore at its founding as a town of free blacks, Freedom; while Aberdeen wants to call it "New Prospera".

As the consultant talks with the residents of the town and investigates its history, the backstory of his injury is gradually revealed. After repeatedly stubbing his toe and covering it up with Apex bandages, the consultant accidentally stepped into pig feces during a company team retreat. Because of the colored bandage, he never discovered how his toe was badly infected, and fainted on the sidewalk after fleeing from an awards party. This led to the amputation of his toe, his departure from the nomenclature firm, and the beginning of his hermetic lifestyle.

After much deliberation, the consultant decides on the name "Struggle", the original idea of the other of the two original founders, Field. Following this, the consultant promptly returns home, where his foot injury continues to bother him even more than before.

== Themes ==
In an interview with Alma Books, Whitehead states that the concept of the book originated from an article about the naming process for new pharmaceuticals such as Prozac. The article made Whitehead question how a similar process is used to assert a certain control over one's environment (his example is a boulevard named after a particular person), and yoking the two concepts was the beginning of the ideas that led to his composition of the novel.

== Reception ==
The novel was critically well-received overall. It was highlighted among The New York Times 100 Most Notable Books of the Year and the 100 Noteworthy Books from 2006 (as published by The Charleston Gazette). In a review in The Boston Globe, Saul Austerlitz called it a "wickedly funny new novel." USA Today noted, "no novelist writing today is more engaging and entertaining when it comes to questions of race, class and commercial culture than Colson Whitehead," concluding that the novel "gets to the heart of the thing, but in a delightfully roundabout way." The San Francisco Chronicle gave the novel a mixed review, commenting, "It's pure joy to read writing like this, but watching Whitehead sketch out a minor character's essence with one stroke, while breathtaking, makes one wish the same treatment was afforded the people who ostensibly inhabit the novel's complex ideas." American trade news magazine Publishers Weekly reacted negatively to the book, writing, "Whitehead disappoints in this intriguingly conceived but static tale of a small town with an identity crisis."

Erin Aubry Kaplan of the Los Angeles Times noted, "too often, [Whitehead] can't resist the temptation of irony, and his big ideas are sometimes overwhelmed by one wink-wink or metaphor too many." Kirkus Reviews praised the book, writing, "while making no attempt at depth of characterization, Whitehead audaciously blurs the line between social realism and fabulist satire." The Library Journal praised the book, noting, "in spare and evocative prose, Whitehead does Shakespeare one better: What's in a name, and how does our identity relate to our own sense of who we are?" The New York Observer was critical of the book but noted, "readers not looking for direct emotional access to the characters may find it gratifying to solve the intellectual puzzle set here by Colson Whitehead."

Scott Esposito of webzine PopMatters gave the novel mixed comments, writing, "it is no surprise that Apex Hides the Hurt, Whitehead's third novel, is packed with a number of allegorical elements blended into a multi-layered structure. What's unfortunate, however, is that all this technical artistry is in the service of unremarkable themes and ideas." Entertainment website The A.V. Club complimented the book, writing, "perhaps taking his cues from his protagonist's profession, Whitehead keeps his prose as streamlined as it comes, and he uses it to craft a satiric novel in tune with a moment where marketing overshadows content and even the lowliest blogger thinks in branding terms." Michael McGirr of The Sydney Morning Herald called it "a book of abundant irony."

== Honors ==
- PEN Oakland/Josephine Miles Literary Award
