= Robert Anasi =

American writer and journalist

Robert Anasi, (born in Providence, Rhode Island in 1966) is an American writer and journalist. He is the author of The Gloves, a nonfiction memoir of his experience boxing in the Golden Gloves competition. and The Last Bohemia: Scenes from the Life of Williamsburg, Brooklyn (Farrar, Straus and Giroux). His journalism, interviews and criticism have appeared in the New York Times, Virginia Quarterly Review, New York Observer, Los Angeles Times, LA Review of Books, Pacific Standard, Salon, and Publishers Weekly, among many others. In April 2019, his non-fiction story ‘First Stripe’ was published in The Bittersweet Science (University of Chicago Press) and he is a regular reviewer for the TLS. Anasi has received fellowships from the New York Foundation for the Arts, the Schaeffer Foundation, and U.C. Irvine's Chancellor's Club. He recently finished a book on exploring the ‘lost cities’ of the Andean Amazon and is currently researching both a family history and a book-TV project about a legendary police informant in the contemporary underworld of the American West.

The Village Voice named him a "writer on the verge," and called The Gloves "a streetwise loveletter to a dying sport" that "recalls Norman Mailer's metajournalism". Anasi's journalism has been published in The New York Times, the New York Observer, Publishers Weekly, and Maxim. He was an artist in residence at the MacDowell Colony in 2005 and 2008.

== Works ==
- The Gloves
- The Introduction to new edition of The Sweet Science (by A.J. Liebling) Farrar, Straus & Giroux
- The Last Bohemia: Scenes from the Life of Williamsburg, Brooklyn, Farrar, Straus & Giroux, 2012
