= The Underground Railroad (novel) =

2016 novel by Colson Whitehead

- Author: Colson Whitehead
- Language: English
- Subject: Slavery
- Publisher: Doubleday
- Publication date: August 2, 2016
- Publication place: United States
- Pages: 320
- Awards: Pulitzer Prize for Fiction; National Book Award for Fiction; Andrew Carnegie Medal; Arthur C. Clarke Award
- ISBN: 978-0-385-54236-4

The Underground Railroad is a historical fiction novel by American author Colson Whitehead, published by Doubleday in 2016. The alternate history novel tells the story of Cora, a slave in the Antebellum South during the 19th century, who makes a bid for freedom from her Georgia plantation by following the Underground Railroad, which the novel depicts as an actual rail transport system with safe houses and secret routes.

The book was a critical and commercial success and won several literary awards, including the Pulitzer Prize for Fiction, the National Book Award for Fiction, the Arthur C. Clarke Award, and the 2017 Andrew Carnegie Medal for Excellence. A TV miniseries adaptation, written and directed by Barry Jenkins, was released in May 2021.

== Plot ==
The book alternates between the perspective of the lead character, Cora, and chapters told from a different character's perspective. The featured characters are Ajarry, Cora's grandmother; Ridgeway, a slave catcher; Stevens, a South Carolina doctor conducting a social experiment; Ethel, the wife of a North Carolina station agent; Caesar, a fellow enslaved person who escapes the plantation with Cora; and Mabel, Cora's mother. The chapter locations are: Georgia, South Carolina, North Carolina, Tennessee, Indiana, and (an undefined) "North".

Cora is an enslaved person on a plantation in Georgia and an outcast after her mother, Mabel, ran off without her. She resents Mabel for abandoning her. Caesar approaches Cora about a plan to flee. Reluctant at first, she eventually agrees as her situation with her master and fellow slaves worsens. During their escape, they encounter a group of slave catchers, who capture Cora's young friend Lovey. Cora is forced to kill a twelve-year-old boy to protect herself and Caesar, eliminating any possibility of merciful treatment should she be recaptured. With the help of an inexperienced abolitionist, Cora and Caesar find a spur of the Underground Railroad, which is operated as a literal underground train system that runs throughout the south, transporting runaways northwards. They take a train to South Carolina.

Upon learning of their escape, Ridgeway begins a hunt for the pair, mainly in revenge for Mabel, who is the only escapee he has ever failed to capture. Cora and Caesar have taken up comfortable residence in South Carolina under assumed names. South Carolina is enacting a program where the government owns formerly enslaved people but employs them, provides medical treatment, and gives them communal housing. The two enjoy their time there and put off the decision to leave until Cora learns of plans to sterilize black women and use black men as test subjects in an experiment to track the spread and degenerative effects of syphilis. Ridgeway arrives before the two can leave, and Cora is forced to return to the Railroad alone. She later learns that Caesar was killed by an angry mob after having been caught and jailed by Ridgeway.

Cora eventually arrives at a closed-down station in North Carolina. She is found by Martin, the son of the station's former operator. North Carolina has recently decided to abolish slavery, using indentured servants instead, and violently executes any runaway slaves found in the state (as well as some freedmen). Terrified of what the North Carolinians might do to an abolitionist, Martin hides Cora in his attic for several months. Cora becomes ill and is reluctantly treated by Martin's wife, Ethel. While Cora is down from the attic, a raid is conducted on the house, and Ridgeway recaptures her while the townspeople execute Martin and Ethel.

Ridgeway takes Cora back toward Georgia, detouring through Tennessee to return another enslaved person to his owner. While stopped in Tennessee, Ridgeway's traveling party is attacked by the free-born Royal and two escaped enslaved people, who release Cora. Cora and Royal travel to a farm in Indiana owned by a free black man named Valentine. The farm is populated by several freedmen and escapees, living and working in harmony. Royal, an operator on the Railroad, begins a romantic relationship with Cora, although she remains hesitant because of a rape by other slaves in her childhood.

A small faction of freedmen oppose harboring escaped slaves, fearing that their presence could ruin their peaceful lives. Eventually, the farm is burned, and many people, including Royal, are killed in a raid by white Hoosiers. Ridgeway recaptures Cora and forces her to take him to a closed-down Railroad station nearby. When they arrive, she pushes him down a flight of stairs, severely injuring him. When last seen, he whispers thoughts on the "American imperative" to Homer, who writes them in his journal. Cora then runs off down the tracks. Eventually, she emerges from the underground to find a caravan traveling West. She is given a ride by one of the wagons' black drivers.

== Writing and publication ==
Whitehead has said that he had the idea that became The Underground Railroad in 2000, after he had finished writing John Henry Days, but "didn't feel [...] mature enough [...] or a good enough writer" to write it at the time. He initially intended for the main character to be a single man. Whitehead began working on the book more seriously in 2014, conducting research by reading narratives of former slaves, notably including those recorded in the WPA Slave Narrative Collection.

The Underground Railroad was first published by Doubleday in August 2016. Its first print run was 200,000 copies. Within a year the novel was reported to have sold over 825,000 copies, and it has since been translated into at least 40 languages.

== Literary influences and parallels ==
In the "Acknowledgments", Whitehead mentions two famous escaped enslaved people: "Frederick Douglass and Harriet Jacobs". While in Jacobs's native North Carolina, Cora has to hide in an attic where, like Jacobs, she is not able to stand, but like her, can observe the outside life through a hole that "had been carved from the inside, the work of a previous occupant". Martin Ebel, who observed this parallel in a review for the Swiss Tages-Anzeiger, also wrote that the "Freedom Trail", where the victims of North Carolinian lynchings hang from trees, has a historic predecessor in the crosses the Romans raised along the Appian Way to kill the enslaved people who had joined Spartacus' slave rebellion, written on by Arthur Koestler in his novel The Gladiators. Ridgeway reminds Ebel of inspector Javert, the hero's merciless persecutor in Victor Hugo's Les Misérables.

In The New Yorker, reviewer Kathryn Schulz likens Ridgeway to both Captain Ahab of Moby-Dick and the slave catcher August Pullman of the television series Underground: "Ridgeway ... and August Pullman, in "Underground", are Ahab-like characters, privately and demonically obsessed with tracking down specific fugitives". Both Ahab and Ridgeway have a soft spot for a black boy: Ahab for the cabin-boy Pip, and Ridgeway for 10-year-old Homer, whom he bought as a slave and set free the next day.

In Whitehead's North Carolina, all blacks have been "abolished". Martin Ebel observes the parallel to the Nazi exterminations of Jews and also the parallel between Cora's concealment and Anne Frank's.

== Reception ==
External videos
- Presentation by Whitehead at the Miami Book Fair on The Underground Railroad, November 20, 2016, C-SPAN

=== Critical reception ===
The novel received positive reviews from critics. Reviewers praised it for its commentary on the past and present of the United States.

In 2019, The Underground Railroad was ranked 30th on The Guardian's list of the 100 best books of the 21st century. The novel was voted the greatest of its decade in Paste and was third place (along with Jennifer Egan's A Visit from the Goon Squad) in a list by Literary Hub.

=== Honors and awards ===
The novel has received a number of awards, including the 2017 Pulitzer Prize for Fiction and the 2016 National Book Award for Fiction. The previous book to win both the Pulitzer and the National Book prizes was The Shipping News, by E. Annie Proulx, in 1993. While awarding the Pulitzer Prize, the committee recognized Whitehead's novel for a "smart melding of realism and allegory that combines the violence of slavery and the drama of escape in a myth that speaks to contemporary America". The Underground Railroad was also awarded the Arthur C. Clarke Award for science fiction literature, the 2016 Goodreads Choice Award., and the 2017 Andrew Carnegie Medal for Excellence. It was longlisted for the 2017 Man Booker Prize. When The Underground Railroad was published in the United States in August 2016, it was selected for Oprah's Book Club. In 2024, The New York Times named it the seventh best book on their 100 Best Books of the 21st Century list.

On August 5, 2020, a crater on Pluto's moon Charon was named Cora, after the character in the novel, by the International Astronomical Union's Working Group for Planetary System Nomenclature.

== Television adaptation ==
It was announced in March 2017 that Amazon was making a limited drama series based on The Underground Railroad, written and directed by Barry Jenkins. The series was released on Amazon Prime Video on May 14, 2021.

== See also ==
- Tuskegee Syphilis Study
