= John Henry Days =

2001 novel by Colson Whitehead

- First edition cover
- Author: Colson Whitehead
- Language: English
- Genre: Historical fiction
- Publisher: Doubleday
- Publication date: May 15, 2001
- Publication place: United States
- Media type: Print (hardback and paperback)
- Pages: 400 (hardback edition)
- ISBN: 0-385-49819-5

John Henry Days is a 2001 novel by American author Colson Whitehead. This is his second full-length work.

== Plot summary ==
Building the railways that made the United States, John Henry died with a hammer in his hand moments after competing against a steam drill in a battle of endurance. The story of his death made him a legend. Over a century later, freelance journalist J. Sutter is sent to West Virginia to cover the launch of a new postage stamp at the first John Henry Days festival.

== Reception ==
Maya Jaggi, writing for The Guardian, praised John Henry Days, writing that it is "propelled by the quality of the writing and observation which, together with his serious intent, elevate it above frothier social satire." Writing in The New York Times, novelist Jonathan Franzen likened the novel to Ulysses and Moby-Dick in its "encyclopedic aspirations", but added: "John Henry Days is funny and wise and sumptuously written, but it's only rarely a page turner."

== Honors ==
Year	Award	Result	Ref.
2001	Los Angeles Times Book Prize for Fiction	Finalist	
2001	National Book Critics Circle Award for Fiction	Shortlist	
2002	BCALA Literary Awards	Honor book	
2002	Pulitzer Prize for Fiction	Shortlist	
