= The Intuitionist =

1999 novel by Colson Whitehead

- First edition cover
- Author: Colson Whitehead
- Language: English
- Genre: Speculative fiction
- Publisher: Anchor Books
- Publication date: January 1999
- Publication place: United States
- Media type: Print (hardback & paperback)
- Pages: 272 (hardback edition)
- ISBN: 0-385-49299-5 (hardback edition) & ISBN 0-385-49300-2 (paperback edition)
- OCLC: 38853819
- Dewey Decimal: 813/.54 21
- LC Class: PS3573.H4768 I58 1999

The Intuitionist is a 1999 postmodern philosophical speculative fiction novel by American writer Colson Whitehead.

The Intuitionist is set in a fictional world, taking place in a city (implicitly, New York) full of skyscrapers and other buildings requiring vertical transportation in the form of elevators. The era, never identified explicitly, is one when black people are called "colored" and integration is a current topic. The protagonist is Lila Mae Watson, an elevator inspector of the "Intuitionist" school. The Intuitionists practice an inspecting method by which they ride in an elevator and intuit the state of the elevator and its related systems. The competing school, the "Empiricists", insists upon traditional instrument-based verification of the condition of the elevator. Watson is the second black inspector and the first black female inspector in the city.

== Plot summary ==
The story begins with the catastrophic failure of an elevator which Watson had inspected just days before, leading to suspicion cast upon both herself and the Intuitionist school as a whole. To cope with the inspectorate, the corporate elevator establishment, and other looming elements, she must return to her intellectual roots, the texts (both known and lost) of the founder of the school, to try to reconstruct what is happening around her.

In the course of her search, she discovers the central idea of the founder of Intuitionism – that of the "black box", the perfect elevator, which will deliver the people to the city of the future.

== Characters ==
- Lila Mae Watson: Protagonist
- James Fulton: Founder of Intuitionism (dead before the story starts)
- Raymond Coombs: Spy for a big elevator company (disguised as "Natchez", a poor nephew of Fulton's interested in the black box and in Lila Mae)
- Marie Claire Rogers: Fulton's servant and heir
- Ben Urich: Reporter who has written a story on the black box for Lift magazine
- Jim Corrigan and John Murphy: Thugs
- Frank Chancre: President of the Elevator Guild, Empiricist
- Orville Lever: Liberal and Intuitionist candidate for the presidency of the Elevator Guild
- Mr. Reed: Lever's secretary and campaign manager
- Charles "Chuck" Gould: Mere escalator inspector, on good terms with Lila Mae
- Pompey: Black elevator inspector, Empiricist

== Critical reception ==
A Newsweek review wrote, "255 pages of the most engaging literary sleuthing you'll read this year," and "What makes the novel so extraordinary is the ways in which Whitehead plays with notions of race." Walter Kirn, writing in Time, called it "The freshest racial allegory since Ralph Ellison's Invisible Man and Toni Morrison's The Bluest Eye."

Gary Krist, writing in The New York Times, said it was an "ingenious and starkly original first novel."

A review in the San Francisco Chronicle compared it to Catch-22, and Thomas Pynchon's V. and The Crying of Lot 49.

== Honors ==
- Quality Paperback Book Club New Voices Award
- Finalist, PEN/Hemingway Award
- New York Times Notable Book
